= 1984 in Dutch television =

This is a list of Dutch television related events from 1984.

== Events ==
- 14 March – Maribelle is selected to represent Netherlands at the 1984 Eurovision Song Contest with her song "Ik hou van jou". She is selected to be the twenty-ninth Dutch Eurovision entry during Nationaal Songfestival held at NOS Studios in Hilversum.
- 5 May – Sweden wins the Eurovision Song Contest with the song "Diggi-Loo Diggi-Ley" by Herreys. The Netherlands finish in thirteenth place with their entry "Ik hou van jou" by Maribelle.

== Television shows ==
=== 1950s ===
- NOS Journaal (1956–present)

=== 1970s ===
- Sesamstraat (1976–present)

=== 1980s ===
- Jeugdjournaal (1981–present)

== Networks and services ==
=== Launches ===
Network	Type	Launch date	Notes	Source
TV5 Monde	Cable television	2 January		
Screensport	Cable television	29 March		

== Births ==
- 7 April – Rick Brandsteder, TV presenter & model
- 14 August – Nicolette van Dam, actress & TV presenter
