= Austria in the Eurovision Song Contest 1984 =

- Eurovision Song Contest 1984
- Participating broadcaster: Österreichischer Rundfunk (ORF)
- Country: Austria
- Selection process: National final
- Selection date: 22 March 1984

Competing entry
- Song: "Einfach weg"
- Artist: Anita
- Songwriters: Brigitte Seuberth; Walter Müller

Placement
- Final result: 19th, 5 points

Participation chronology

Austria was represented at the Eurovision Song Contest 1984 with the song "Einfach weg", composed by Brigitte Seuberth, with lyrics by Walter Müller, and performed by Anita. The Austrian participating broadcaster Österreichischer Rundfunk (ORF), selected its entry through a national final.

== Before Eurovision ==
=== National final ===
Österreichischer Rundfunk (ORF) held the national final on 22 March 1984 at its television studios in Vienna, hosted by Vera Russwurm. The winning song was chosen by a jury of 250 viewers who voted by telephone.

Final – 22 March 1984
R/O	Artist	Song	Points	Place
1	Sandra Wells	"Hier ist mein Lied"	369	8
2	Martha Butbul	"He du"	352	9
3	The Kids	"Schatten der Vergangenheit"	517	5
4	Andy Marek	"Top Secret"	516	6
5	Anita	"Einfach weg"	1,404	1
6	By Chance	"Vogel im Wind"	469	7
7	Birgit	"Ich bin Frau"	270	10
8	Ruth Hale	"Ich steh' unter Strom"	130	12
9	Andreas Wörz	"Singen is Gold"	872	3
10	Peter Jug	"Saison"	567	4
11	Gitti and Gary	"Kumm hoit mi"	931	2
12	Helmut Rudolfs	"Erste Liebe"	204	11

== At Eurovision ==
On the night of the final Anita performed thirteenth in the running order, following Yugoslavia and preceding Germany. At the close of voting "Einfach weg" had received 5 points, placing Austria 19th (last) of the 19 entries. The Austrian jury awarded its 12 points to Sweden.

=== Voting ===
Points awarded to Austria
Score	Country
12 points	
10 points	
8 points	
7 points	
6 points	
5 points	
4 points	Denmark
3 points	
2 points	
1 point	Ireland

Points awarded by Austria
Score	Country
12 points	Sweden
10 points	Ireland
8 points	France
7 points	Italy
6 points	Spain
5 points	Finland
4 points	Denmark
3 points	Belgium
2 points	United Kingdom
1 point	Germany
