= Sweden in the Eurovision Song Contest 1984 =

- Eurovision Song Contest 1984
- Participating broadcaster: Sveriges Television (SVT)
- Country: Sweden
- Selection process: Melodifestivalen 1984
- Selection date: 25 February 1984

Competing entry
- Song: "Diggi-Loo Diggi-Ley"
- Artist: Herreys
- Songwriters: Torgny Söderberg; Britt Lindeborg

Placement
- Final result: 1st, 145 points

Participation chronology

Sweden was represented at the Eurovision Song Contest 1984 with the song "Diggi-Loo Diggi-Ley", composed by Torgny Söderberg, with lyrics by Britt Lindeborg, and performed by Herreys. The Swedish participating broadcaster, Sveriges Television (SVT), selected its entry through Melodifestivalen 1984. The entry eventually won the Eurovision Song Contest.

== Before Eurovision ==
=== Melodifestivalen 1984 ===
Melodifestivalen 1984 was the selection for the 24th song to represent Sweden at the Eurovision Song Contest. It was the 23rd time that this system of picking a song had been used. 90 songs were submitted to Sveriges Television (SVT) for the competition. The final was held in the Lisebergshallen in Gothenburg on 25 February 1984, presented by Fredrik Belfrage and was broadcast on TV1 but was not broadcast on radio. Herreys went on to win that year's Eurovision Song Contest in Luxembourg; Sweden's second Eurovision win.

R/O	Artist	Song	Songwriter(s)	Result
1	Janne Önnerud	"Nu är jag tillbaks igen"	Monica Forsberg; Örjan Fahlström	—N/a
2	Göran Folkestad and Lotta Pedersen	"Sankta Cecilia"	Göran Folkestad; Vicki Benckert	Qualified
3	Rosa Körberg	"Schack och matt"	Monica Forsberg; Örjan Fahlström	—N/a
4	John Ballard	"Rendez-vous"	Paula af Malmborg, Bjarne Nyqvist	Qualified
5	Herreys	"Diggi-Loo Diggi-Ley"	Britt Lindeborg; Torgny Söderberg	Qualified
6	Per-Erik Hallin	"Labyrint"	Per-Erik Hallin	—N/a
7	Elisabeth Andreasson	"Kärleksmagi"	Peter Wiberg; Vicki Benckert	—N/a
8	Karin and Anders Glenmark	"Kall som is"	Ingela 'Pling' Forsman; Anders Glenmark	Qualified
9	Thomas Lewing	"Tjuvarnas natt"	Ingela 'Pling' Forsman; Bruno Glenmark	—N/a
10	Vicki Benckert	"Livet är som ett träd"	Vicki Benckert	Qualified

Artist	Song	Songwriter(s)	Points	Place
Göran Folkestad and Lotta Pedersen	"Sankta Cecilia"	Göran Folkestad; Vicki Benckert	41	2
John Ballard	"Rendez-vous"	Paula af Malmborg, Bjarne Nyqvist	39	3
Herreys	"Diggi-Loo Diggi-Ley"	Britt Lindeborg; Torgny Söderberg	49	1
Karin and Anders Glenmark	"Kall som is"	Ingela 'Pling' Forsman; Anders Glenmark	33	4
Vicki Benckert	"Livet är som ett träd"	Vicki Benckert	27	5

Voting
Song	15–20	20–25	25–30	30–35	35–40	40–45	45–50	50–55	55–60	Total
"Sankta Cecilia"	1	2	6	4	4	6	8	4	6	41
"Rendez-vous"	8	8	2	8	1	2	2	6	2	39
"Diggi-Loo Diggi-Ley"	6	4	1	2	6	8	6	8	8	49
"Kall som is"	2	1	8	6	8	4	1	2	1	33
"Livet är som ett träd"	4	6	4	1	2	1	4	1	4	27

== At Eurovision ==
Sweden was the first country to perform the Eurovision Song Contest that year. In the voting, they received not less than 5 "douze points" from the other 18 countries. Finally the brothers were victorious, with a total of 145 points - 8 points ahead of Ireland. Sweden had won exactly 10 years earlier, then represented by ABBA.

=== Voting ===
Points awarded to Sweden
Score	Country
12 points	Austria; Cyprus; Denmark; Germany; Ireland
10 points	Netherlands; Norway; Switzerland
8 points	Finland
7 points	Belgium; United Kingdom
6 points	France; Italy; Luxembourg
5 points	
4 points	Portugal; Spain; Yugoslavia
3 points	Turkey
2 points	
1 point	

Points awarded by Sweden
Score	Country
12 points	Ireland
10 points	Spain
8 points	Norway
7 points	Finland
6 points	Turkey
5 points	Denmark
4 points	Cyprus
3 points	United Kingdom
2 points	France
1 point	Switzerland
