= United Kingdom in the Eurovision Song Contest 1984 =

- Eurovision Song Contest 1984
- Participating broadcaster: British Broadcasting Corporation (BBC)
- Country: United Kingdom
- Selection process: A Song for Europe 1984
- Selection date: 4 April 1984

Competing entry
- Song: "Love Games"
- Artist: Belle and the Devotions
- Songwriters: Paul Curtis; Graham Sacher

Placement
- Final result: 7th, 63 points

Participation chronology

The United Kingdom was represented at the Eurovision Song Contest 1984 with the song "Love Games", written by Paul Curtis and Graham Sacher, and performed by Belle and the Devotions. The British participating broadcaster, the British Broadcasting Corporation (BBC), selected its entry through a national final.

== Before Eurovision ==
=== A Song for Europe 1984 ===
The British Broadcasting Corporation (BBC) used once again the television show A Song for Europe to select its entry, as it had since its debut at the contest in 1957.

The BBC held the national final on 4 April 1984 at Studio 1 of the BBC Television Centre in London, hosted once again by Terry Wogan. The BBC Concert Orchestra under the direction of John Coleman as conductor accompanied all the songs, but all the music was pre-recorded. The votes of eight regional juries based in Edinburgh, Norwich, Belfast, London, Cardiff, Manchester, Bristol and Birmingham decided the winner. Each jury region awarded 15 points to their favourite song, 12 points to the second, 10 points to the third and then 9, 8, 7, 6 and 5 points in order of preference for the songs from 4th to 8th. In an plan to modernise the show, computer graphics where used for the first time during the voting.

Singers Sinitta and Hazell Dean would later go on to become successful chart acts - both under the producership of Stock Aitken Waterman. The latter scoring her first top 10 hit just a few weeks after the contest.

A Song for Europe 1984 – 4 April 1984
R/O	Artist	Song	Songwriter(s)	Points	Place
1	Caprice	"Magical Music"	Mike Finesilver	60	6
2	Nina Shaw	"Look at Me Now"	Jeremy Paul	78	3
3	Bryan Evans	"This Love Is Deep"	Steve Glen, Mike Burns; Nicky Chinn	53	8
4	Belle and the Devotions	"Love Games"	Paul Curtis; Graham Sacher	112	1
5	First Division	"Where the Action Is"	Paul Curtis; Graham Sacher	79	2
6	Miriam Anne Lesley	"Let It Shine"	Paul Curtis	62	5
7	Sinitta	"Imagination"	Paul Curtis; Tony Hiller	77	4
8	Hazell Dean	"Stay in My Life"	Hazell Dean; Mike Bradley	55	7

Detailed Jury Votes
R/O	Song	Edinburgh	Norwich	Belfast	London	Cardiff	Manchester	Bristol	Birmingham	Total
1	"Magical Music"	9	5	7	8	5	10	9	7	60
2	"Look at Me Now"	8	10	8	9	15	9	7	12	78
3	"This Love Is Deep"	7	6	9	6	7	7	5	6	53
4	"Love Games"	15	15	15	15	10	12	15	15	112
5	"Where the Action Is"	12	8	6	12	8	15	8	10	79
6	"Let It Shine"	10	7	12	5	9	5	6	8	62
7	"Imagination"	6	12	10	10	12	6	12	9	77
8	"Stay in My Life"	5	9	5	7	6	8	10	5	55
Jury Spokespersons
Edinburgh – Ken Bruce; Norwich – Judi Lines; Belfast – Diane Harron; London – Colin Berry; Cardiff – Iwan Thomas; Manchester – Alan Yardley; Bristol – Vivien Creegor; Birmingham – Paul Coia

== At Eurovision ==
The group finished 7th with 63 points. Sweden ended up winning the competition with the song "Diggi-Loo Diggi-Ley".

Terry Wogan once again provided the television commentary for BBC 1, for the second consecutive year Radio 2 opted not to broadcast the contest, however the contest was broadcast on British Forces Radio with commentary provided by Richard Nankivell. The BBC appointed again Colin Berry as its spokesperson to announce the results of the British jury.

=== Voting ===
Points awarded to the United Kingdom
Score	Country
12 points	
10 points	Italy
8 points	Ireland; Norway
7 points	Germany
6 points	Portugal
5 points	
4 points	Finland; Netherlands
3 points	Spain; Sweden
2 points	Austria; Belgium; Cyprus
1 point	Denmark; Luxembourg; Turkey; Yugoslavia

Points awarded by the United Kingdom
Score	Country
12 points	Denmark
10 points	Switzerland
8 points	Ireland
7 points	Sweden
6 points	France
5 points	Turkey
4 points	Spain
3 points	Yugoslavia
2 points	Germany
1 point	Netherlands
