= Denmark in the Eurovision Song Contest 1984 =

- Eurovision Song Contest 1984
- Participating broadcaster: Danmarks Radio (DR)
- Country: Denmark
- Selection process: Dansk Melodi Grand Prix 1984
- Selection date: 18 February 1984

Competing entry
- Song: "Det' lige det"
- Artist: Hot Eyes
- Songwriters: Søren Bundgaard; Keld Heick

Placement
- Final result: 4th, 101 points

Participation chronology

Denmark was represented at the Eurovision Song Contest 1984 with the song "Det' lige det", composed by Søren Bundgaard, with lyrics by Keld Heick, and performed by Hot Eyes. (Note: Hot Eyes was the name chosen for use at Eurovision by duo Kirsten & Søren –Kirsten Siggaard Andersen and Søren Bundgaard Nielsen–.) The Danish participating broadcaster, Danmarks Radio (DR), organised the Dansk Melodi Grand Prix 1984 in order to select its entry for the contest. This was the first of three Eurovision appearances in five years for the couple.

== Before Eurovision ==
=== Dansk Melodi Grand Prix 1984 ===
Danmarks Radio (DR) held the Dansk Melodi Grand Prix 1984 on 18 February at TV-Byen in Gladsaxe, hosted by Jørgen de Mylius. Ten songs took part with the winner being decided by voting from five regional juries. The voting was close, with "Det' lige det" winning by only a 1-point margin. Other participants included familiar DMGP and Eurovision face Tommy Seebach and Lise Haavik (Trax) who would represent Denmark in 1986.

Final – 18 February 1984
R/O	Artist	Song	Songwriter(s)	Points	Place
1	Trax	"Vi hører sammen"	John Hatting; Per Nielsen; Lise Haavik	33	6
2	Regnar Egekvist	"Holder af de ting"	Regnar Egekvist	11	9
3	Snapshot	"À la carte"	Niels Drevsholt	41	3
4	Lecia Jønsson	"Det er en hemmelighed"	Lecia Jønsson; Ivan Pedersen	35	5
5	Lollipops	"60'erne"	Torben Lundgren; Jørgen Lundgren	8	10
6	Sheila	"Gi' mig tid"	Torben Lendager; Henrik H. Lund	46	2
7	Boulevard	"Liverpool"	Dennis Dehnhardt; Poul Dehnhardt; Lennart Johannessen	17	7
8	John Hatting	"Donna, Donna"	Jens Brixtofte; John Hatting; Ivan Pedersen	15	8
9	Tommy Seebach	"Pyjamas for to"	Tommy Seebach; Keld Heick	40	4
10	Kirsten and Søren	"Det' lige det"	Søren Bundgaard; Keld Heick	47	1

Detailed Regional Jury Votes
R/O	Song	West Jutland	East Jutland	Funen, Lolland-Falster, and Bornholm	Zealand	Capital Region	Total
1	"Vi hører sammen"	5	8	5	5	10	33
2	"Holder af de ting"	1	1	3	1	5	11
3	"À la carte"	8	8	8	12	5	41
4	"Det er en hemmelighed"	10	5	7	6	7	35
5	"60'erne"	2	2	1	2	1	8
6	"Gi' mig tid"	12	6	12	8	8	46
7	"Liverpool"	4	4	4	3	2	17
8	"Donna, Donna"	3	3	2	4	3	15
9	"Pyjamas for to"	7	10	7	10	6	40
10	"Det' lige det"	6	12	10	7	12	47

== At Eurovision ==
On the night of the final Hot Eyes performed 10th in the running order, following Ireland and preceding the Netherlands. At the close of voting "Det' lige det" received 101 points, placing Denmark 4th of the 19 entries, the country's first top 5 placing since their return to Eurovision in 1978. "Det' lige det" became only the fourth non-winning Eurovision song to receive points from every other national jury (following France in 1976 and 1978, and Belgium in 1982). The Danish jury awarded its 12 points to contest winners Sweden.

The contest was broadcast on DR TV, with commentary by Jørgen de Mylius.

=== Voting ===
Points awarded to Denmark
Score	Country
12 points	Norway; United Kingdom
10 points	Ireland
8 points	Belgium; France
7 points	
6 points	Spain; Yugoslavia
5 points	Cyprus; Finland; Germany; Italy; Sweden
4 points	Austria
3 points	Luxembourg; Netherlands
2 points	Turkey
1 point	Portugal; Switzerland

Points awarded by Denmark
Score	Country
12 points	Sweden
10 points	Cyprus
8 points	Switzerland
7 points	Spain
6 points	Finland
5 points	Luxembourg
4 points	Austria
3 points	Ireland
2 points	Germany
1 point	United Kingdom
