= Richard Herrey =

Swedish artist, politician, media personality and restaurant manager

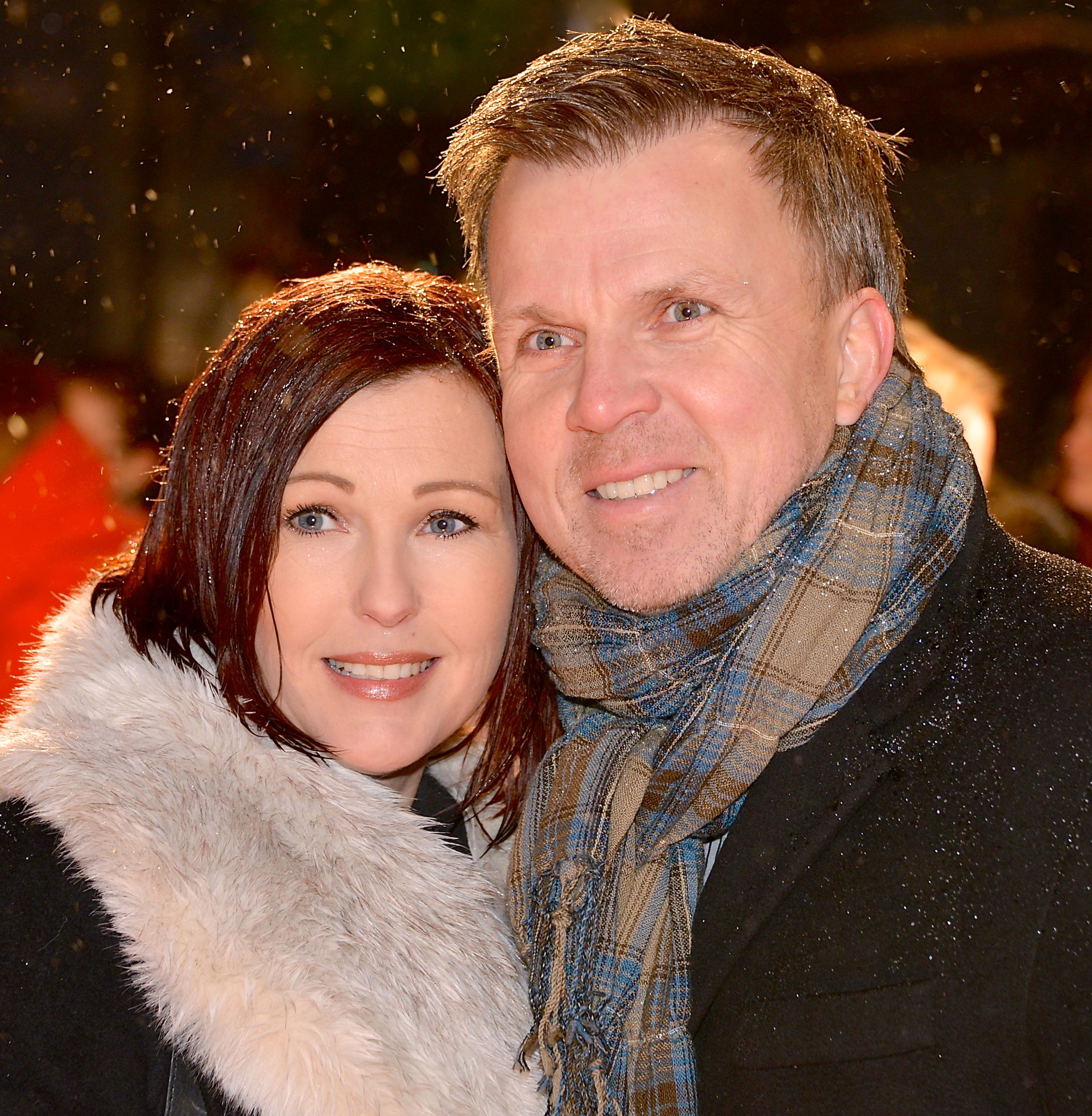

Member of the Riksdag
- In office 5 March 2022 – 26 September 2022

Personal details
- Born: 19 August 1964 (age 62) Strömstad
- Party: Moderate Party
- Occupation: artist; politician; media personality; restaurant manager
- Known for: Winner of the 1984 Eurovision Song Contest as part of Herreys, member of the Swedish Riksdag

Per Richard Herrey (born 19 August 1964) is a Swedish artist, politician in the Moderate Party, media personality and restaurant manager.

== Biography ==
Richard Herrey won Melodifestivalen in 1984 together with his brothers Per and Louis as the band Herreys, with their song "Diggi-Loo Diggi-Ley". They went on to win the 1984 Eurovision Song Contest in Luxembourg, which was the second win for Sweden.

All three brothers are Mormons. While Richard Herrey is no longer practicing since the 1980s, his brother Louis is a bishop within The Church of Jesus Christ of Latter-day Saints.

Richard Herrey was a dancer in the Fame TV series 1982–1983. Herrey acted in the Swedish production of the musicals Grease at the Chinateatern 1991–1992, West Side Story at the National Swedish Touring Theatre 1993, and Hair at Chinateatern 1994. He managed Oscarsteatern 1997–1998 where he also was the producer and director of the 40th anniversary production of West Side Story.

Richard Herrey participated in the TV4 dance show Let's Dance with Cecilia Ehrling.

== Political career ==
In the 2018 parliament election Herrey was listed as a candidate for the Moderate Party in the Stockholm County constituency where he made it to the list of substitutes but not as a member of the Riksdag. He served as a substitute during the summer of 2019, in December 2020–January 2021 and again from December 2021. In March 2022 Herrey became a regular member of the Riksdag following the resignation of Fredrik Schulte. He is the first Eurovision winner to be a member of the Swedish parliament. He left the Riksdag following the 2022 election.
