= Love Games (Belle and the Devotions song) =

1984 song by Belle and the Devotions

Single by Belle and the Devotions
- Released: 1984
- Songwriters: Paul Curtis; Graham Sacher

Eurovision Song Contest 1984 entry
- Country: United Kingdom
- Artists: Kit Rolfe; Laura James; Linda Sofield
- As: Belle and the Devotions
- Language: English
- Composers: Paul Curtis; Graham Sacher
- Lyricists: Paul Curtis; Graham Sacher
- Conductor: John Coleman

Finals performance
- Final result: 7th
- Final points: 63

Entry chronology
- ◄ "I'm Never Giving Up" (1983)
- "Love Is…" (1985) ►

"Love Games", is a song written by Paul Curtis and Graham Sacher, and performed by the trio Belle and the Devotions, which was headed by Kit Rolfe. It represented the United Kingdom in the Eurovision Song Contest 1984.

Belle and the Devotions won the right to perform at Luxembourg by winning the UK national final, A Song for Europe, where they were the fourth act to perform. In Luxembourg, the song was performed sixth on the night, following Norway's Dollie de Luxe with "Lenge leve livet" and preceding Cyprus' Andy Paul with "Anna Maria Lena". At the end of judging that evening, "Love Games" took the seventh-place slot with 63 points. At the time, the song was the third-worst performer for the United Kingdom since entering Eurovision in 1957 (the songs in 1966 and 1978 were the only ones to rank lower).

The song was an homage to the girl group sound of 1960s Motown, with the girls lamenting that their lovers had "played love games" with them and broken their hearts. The trio was dressed in bright day-glo coloured jackets and miniskirts, with similarly eye-popping hair (Rolfe went for a platinum blonde, while the other singers dyed their hair yellow and bright red, respectively).

At the end of their performance, some cheers in the audience were met with boos, as many people in Luxembourg were still upset with the United Kingdom after English football fans rioted in the country as a result of being knocked out of the European Championship the previous November.

After Eurovision, the song peaked at No. 11 on the UK Singles Chart.

The 7" single runs to 3:16. The 12" single is an extended version and runs to 4:51. The 12" version has yet to be made available on CD.

== Charts ==
| Chart (1984) | Peak position |
|---|---|
| Ireland (IRMA) | 18 |
| UK Singles Official Charts Company | 11 |

| Preceded by "I'm Never Giving Up" by Sweet Dreams | United Kingdom in the Eurovision Song Contest; 1984 | Succeeded by "Love Is …" by Vikki Watson |
