= Germany in the Eurovision Song Contest 1984 =

- Eurovision Song Contest 1984
- Participating broadcaster: ARD (Note: Arbeitsgemeinschaft der öffentlich-rechtlichen Rundfunkanstalten der Bundesrepublik Deutschland) – Bayerischer Rundfunk (BR)
- Country: Germany
- Selection process: Ein Lied für Luxemburg
- Selection date: 29 March 1984

Competing entry
- Song: "Aufrecht geh'n"
- Artist: Mary Roos
- Songwriters: Michael Reinecke; Michael Kunze

Placement
- Final result: 13th, 34 points

Participation chronology

Germany was represented at the Eurovision Song Contest 1984 with the song "Aufrecht geh'n". The song was composed by Michael Reinecke, with lyrics by Michael Kunze, and performed by Mary Roos. The German participating broadcaster on behalf of ARD, Bayerischer Rundfunk (BR), selected their entry through a national final. Roos previously represented Germany in 1972, and finished third.

== Before Eurovision ==
=== Ein Lied für Luxemburg ===
The final was held at the Deutsches Theater in Munich, hosted by Sabine Sauer. 12 songs took part and the winner was chosen by a panel of approximately 500 people who had been selected as providing a representative cross-section of the German public.

R/O	Artist	Song	Songwriters	Votes	Place
1	Cosi and Relax	"O, i woaß net"	Bernd Vonficht; Todd Canedy; Irmgard Klarmann	2,949	9
2	Jürgen Renfordt	"Als die Erde war geboren"	Hans Blum	3,035	8
3	Harmony Four	"Tingel Tangel Mann"	Ralph Siegel; Bernd Meinunger	3,852	3
4	Madeleine	"Halt mich fest"	Schmidde; Madeleine Lang	2,674	11
5	Helmut Frey	"Hier ist einer zuviel"	Dieter Bohlen; Helmut Frey	3,072	7
6	Giorgia Lauda	"Jeder muß sein Leben leben"	Alexander Gordan; Heike Bubenheim	3,350	6
7	Frank Daniel	"Wo warst Du, als ich starb"	Michael Zai; Vanessa Sera; Horst-Herbert Krause	2,699	10
8	Mary Roos	"Aufrecht geh'n"	Michael Reinecke; Michael Kunze	4,124	1
9	Pas de Bas	"Primaballerina"	Klaus-Dieter Gebauer; Kim Merz	2,599	12
10	Monitor	"Mensch aus Glas"	Wolfgang Köbele; Michael Högl; Erwin Posl	3,754	4
11	Anne Karin	"Niemand"	Walter Gerke; Mick Hannes	3,669	5
12	Bernhard Brink	"Liebe ist"	Michael Reinecke; Erich Offierowski	4,003	2

== At Eurovision ==
On the night of the final Roos performed 14th in the running order, following Austria and preceding Turkey. At the close of voting "Aufrecht geh'n" had received 34 points, placing Germany joint 13th of the 19 entries. The German jury awarded its 12 points to contest winners Sweden.

The show was watched by 14.23 million viewers in Germany.

=== Voting ===
Points awarded to Germany
Score	Country
12 points	
10 points	
8 points	
7 points	Norway
6 points	Belgium
5 points	Netherlands; Portugal
4 points	France
3 points	
2 points	Denmark; Italy; United Kingdom
1 point	Austria

Points awarded by Germany
Score	Country
12 points	Sweden
10 points	Ireland
8 points	Portugal
7 points	United Kingdom
6 points	Italy
5 points	Denmark
4 points	Belgium
3 points	Yugoslavia
2 points	Norway
1 point	Finland
