= Annick Thoumazeau =

French singer

Annick Thoumazeau (born in Fréjus in 1960) is a French singer. She represented France in the Eurovision Song Contest 1984, with the song "Autant d'amoureux que d'étoiles" (English translation: "As Many Lovers As Stars").

Thoumazeau performed third on the night, before Spain, and after Luxembourg. She placed eighth out of nineteen entries, receiving a total of 61 points.

Under the pen name Année Leed, Thoumazeau wrote the lyrics to the musical Virulla, which was staged in Disneyland Paris and Le Théâtre du gymnase, Paris in the 2000s.

Preceded by Guy Bonnet with Vivre	France in the Eurovision Song Contest; 1984	Succeeded by Roger Bens with Femme dans ses rêves aussi
