= Belgium in the Eurovision Song Contest 1984 =

- Eurovision Song Contest 1984
- Participating broadcaster: Radio-télévision belge de la Communauté française (RTBF)
- Country: Belgium
- Selection process: Concours Eurovision de la Chanson '84 - Finale Nationale
- Selection date: 2 March 1984

Competing entry
- Song: "Avanti la vie"
- Artist: Jacques Zegers
- Songwriters: Henri Seroka; Jacques Zegers

Placement
- Final result: 5th, 70 points

Participation chronology

Belgium was represented at the Eurovision Song Contest 1984 with the song "Avanti la vie", composed by Henri Seroka, with lyrics by Jacques Zegers, and performed by Zegers himself. The Belgian participating broadcaster, Walloon Radio-télévision belge de la Communauté française (RTBF), selected its entry through a national final.

== Before Eurovision ==
=== Concours Eurovision de la Chanson '84 - Finale Nationale ===
Walloon broadcaster Radio-télévision belge de la Communauté française (RTBF) had the turn to participate in the Eurovision Song Contest 1984 representing Belgium. It held the national final at its studios in Brussels and was presented by Danielle Sornin de Leysat, with ten songs participating. The running order was done alphabetically by the artist's name as RTBF did not want to be accused of favouring any song. The programme was broadcast live at 20:05 (CET) on Télé 2 and lasted for 40 minutes. Voting was done by a 50/50 split between an 12-member jury and 450 selected TV viewers. The jury consisted of three representatives from SABAM, three journalists, three representatives of the radio industry, and three representatives of the television industry. The results of the national final were then broadcast in a 10 minute-long show at 22:50 (CET) on RTBF 1. Only the top four placings were announced, with "Avanti la vie" being declared the winner.

Final – 2 March 1984
R/O	Artist	Song	Songwriter(s)	Place
1	Marianne Croix	"En écoutant Mahler"	Marianne Croix; Willy Albimoor	—N/a
2	Albert Delchambre	"Traîner en ville"	Evert Verhees; Patricia Maessen; André Burton	—N/a
3	Anne-Marie du Bru	"Voyage"	F. Fievez; F. Charles	—N/a
4	Formule II	"Merci à la vie"	Alexandre Pascal; Eddy Pascal	3
5	Martine Laurent	"Y a des amours heureuses"	Claude Barzotti; Anne-Marie Gaspard	2
6	Jo Lemaire	"Je veux chanter l'hymne a l'amour"	Fa Vanham; Jo Lemaire	—N/a
7	Léonil McCormick	"Donnez-moi des ailes"	Léonil McCormick; M. Selac	—N/a
8	Night Force	"Lance un S.O.S."	Frank De Gryse; Tony Baron	—N/a
9	Franck Olivier	"L'amour est fort"	Pino Marchese; Franck Olivier	4
10	Jacques Zegers	"Avanti la vie"	Henri Seroka; Jacques Zegers	1

== At Eurovision ==
On the night of the final Zegers performed 8th in the running order, following Cyprus and preceding Ireland. At the close of the voting "Avanti la vie" had received 70 points from 11 countries (including maximum 12s from France and Luxembourg), placing Belgium joint fifth (with Italy) of the 19 competing entries. The Belgian jury awarded its 12 points to Ireland.

=== Voting ===
Points awarded to Belgium
Score	Country
12 points	France; Luxembourg
10 points	Finland; Portugal
8 points	Netherlands
7 points	
6 points	
5 points	Turkey
4 points	Germany
3 points	Austria; Norway
2 points	Spain
1 point	Italy

Points awarded by Belgium
Score	Country
12 points	Ireland
10 points	France
8 points	Denmark
7 points	Sweden
6 points	Germany
5 points	Switzerland
4 points	Turkey
3 points	Spain
2 points	United Kingdom
1 point	Norway
