= Misini =

Misini is a surname. Notable people with the surname include:

- Asmir Misini (born 1985), Serbian footballer
- Haki Misini (1951–1999), Kosovo-Albanian singer
