= Guy Bonnet =

Musical artist (1945–2024)

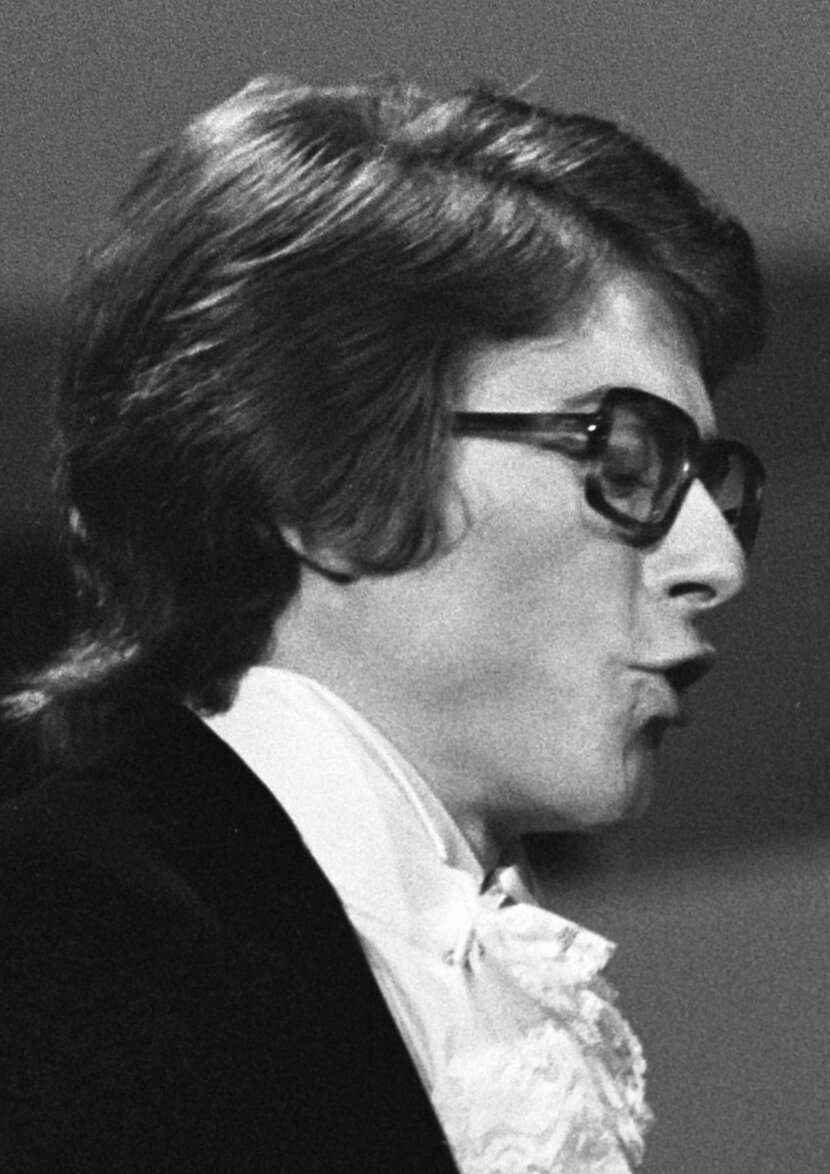
- Bonnet at the Eurovision Song Contest 1970

Background information
- Born: 12 May 1942; Avignon, France
- Died: 8 January 2024 (aged 81); Avignon, France
- Occupations: Author; composer; singer

Guy Bonnet (French pronunciation: [ɡi bɔnɛ]; (12 May 1942 – 8 January 2024) was a French author, composer, and singer. He wrote the lyrics and composed the music for "La Source", the French entry in the Eurovision Song Contest 1968, performed by Isabelle Aubret. In 1970, he participated himself in the contest for France, with "Marie-Blanche" coming fourth out of twelve contestants; he repeated the experience in 1983 with "Vivre", finishing eighth out of twenty.

Bonnet wrote and composed songs for various artists, including Mireille Mathieu, Sylvie Vartan, Franck Fernandel, and Massilia Sound System. He also wrote a contemporary pastorale "La Pastorale des enfants de Provence".

Bonnet died in Avignon on 8 January 2024, at the age of 81.

Preceded by Frida Boccara with Un jour, un enfant	France in the Eurovision Song Contest; 1970	Succeeded by Serge Lama with Un jardin sur la terre
Preceded by Jean Gabilou with Humanahum	France in the Eurovision Song Contest; 1983	Succeeded by Annick Thoumazeau with Autant d'amoureux que d'étoiles
