= Bravo (Spanish group) =

Spanish musical group

- Origin: Spain
- Years active: 1982–1986
- Members: Amaya Saizar; Luis Villar; Yolanda Hoyos; Esteban Santos

Bravo was a Spanish musical group formed in 1982.

The band rose to fame in Spain when they were chosen to represent their country in the Eurovision Song Contest 1984. Spain had received nul points in 1983 and few were expecting a great result with Bravo's entry, "Lady, Lady". However, the song finished in third place in the Eurovision Song Contest 1984 and had great success in the charts in Spain and Latin America.

The band was invited onto many shows in Latin America (including Mexico, Colombia, Chile, Venezuela, and the Dominican Republic) and participated in the Viña del Mar International Song Festival in Chile. The band released two albums before dissolving in 1986.

== Members ==
The band consisted of Amaya Saizar, Luis Villar, Yolanda Hoyos and Esteban Santos.

On 1 November 2020, Esteban Santos died at the age of 69.

== Discography (albums) ==
- Bravo
- Noche a noche

Preceded by Remedios Amaya with "¿Quién maneja mi barca?"	Spain in the Eurovision Song Contest; 1984	Succeeded by Paloma San Basilio with "La fiesta terminó"
