= Diggi-Loo Diggi-Ley =

1984 song by Herrey's

Single by Herreys

from the album Diggi-Loo Diggi-Ley
- Language: Swedish
- Released: 1984
- Length: 3:02
- Label: Mariann
- Composer: Torgny Söderberg
- Lyricist: Britt Lindeborg
- Producers: Anders Engberg; Torgny Söderberg

Eurovision Song Contest 1984 entry
- Country: Sweden
- Artists: Per Herrey; Louis Herrey; Richard Herrey
- As: Herreys
- Language: Swedish
- Composer: Torgny Söderberg
- Lyricist: Britt Lindeborg
- Conductor: Curt-Eric Holmquist

Finals performance
- Final result: 1st
- Final points: 145

Entry chronology
- ◄ "Främling" (1983)
- "Bra vibrationer" (1985) ►

Official performance video
- "Diggi-Loo Diggi-Ley" on YouTube

"Diggi-Loo Diggi-Ley" is a song recorded by Swedish trio Herreys – brothers Per, Louis, and Richard Herrey – with music composed by Torgny Söderberg and Swedish lyrics written by Britt Lindeborg. It was produced by Anders Engberg and Torgny Söderberg. It represented Sweden in the Eurovision Song Contest 1984, held in Luxembourg, winning the contest.

== Background ==
=== Conception ===
"Diggi-Loo Diggi-Ley" was composed by Torgny Söderberg with Swedish lyrics by Britt Lindeborg. It was produced by Anders Engberg and Torgny Söderberg. It is an upbeat 1980s-style dance song. It deals with the lead singer discovering a pair of golden shoes in the street one day. He puts them on and immediately feels like dancing in the street, entering a "magical world". Thus, he wishes for everyone to have a pair. In addition to the Swedish original version, Herreys recorded the song in English with lyrics by Per Herrey.

=== Eurovision ===
On 25 February 1984, "Diggi-Loo Diggi-Ley" performed by Herreys competed in the 23rd edition of the Melodifestivalen. It received 49 points, winning the competition. As the festival was used by Sveriges Television (SVT) to select their song and performer for the 29th edition of the Eurovision Song Contest, the song became the Swedish entry, and Herrey's the performers, for Eurovision.

On 5 May 1984, the Eurovision Song Contest was held at the Théâtre Municipal in Luxembourg hosted by Radio Télévision Luxembourg (RTL), and broadcast live throughout the continent. Herrey's performed "Diggi-Loo Diggi-Ley" first on the evening, preceding Luxembourg's "100% d'amour" by Sophie Carle. Curt-Eric Holmquist conducted the event's orchestra in the performance of the Swedish entry.

At the close of voting, the song had received 145 points, winning the contest. Herreys sang their winning reprise half in Swedish and half in English. They became the third winners of the competition to sing from pole position, following Teach-In in 1975 and Brotherhood of Man in 1976. No song sung first or second has won since. The song was succeeded as winner in 1985 by "La det swinge" by Bobbysocks representing Norway.

Despite the reception the song receives today, in the run-up to the contest it was not an immediate favorite to win: bookmakers Ladbrokes had Ireland's "Terminal 3" and Italy's "I treni di Tozeur" as higher favourites, so the song winning came as a surprise to many. Fellow Swedish Eurovision participant Tommy Körberg famously dubbed the group "the dancing deodorants" in the press, a derogatory nickname that stuck with them for the rest of their career in their home country – and the nonsensical title harking back to previous entries such as "Boom Bang-a-Bang", "Ding-a-dong" and "La, la, la".

=== Aftermath ===
The song has achieved considerable fame among Eurovision Song Contest fans, with a well-known archive of contest lyrics using the domain name diggiloo.net, named after it.

Richard Herrey, the lead singer of the band, performed "Let Me Be the One" (1975 British entry) as part of the interval acts of the fiftieth anniversary competition Congratulations: 50 Years of the Eurovision Song Contest held on 22 October 2005 in Copenhagen. All three band members performed the song with a mixture of English and Swedish lyrics in the Eurovision sixtieth anniversary show Eurovision Song Contest's Greatest Hits held on 31 March 2015 in London. On 9 May 2024, they performed the song at the end of the second semi-final of the 2024 contest held in Malmö, Sweden.

== Track listing ==
1. "Diggi Loo – Diggi Ley" – 3:05
2. "Every Song You Sing" – 3:34

== Charts performance ==
The highest chart position the song reached was No. 2, in the Swedish singles chart. They reached No. 46 on the UK Singles Chart.

=== Weekly charts ===
Chart (1984)	Peak position
Austria (Ö3 Austria Top 40)	11
Belgium (Ultratop 50 Flanders)	3
Finland (Suomen virallinen lista)	4
Netherlands (Dutch Top 40)	5
Netherlands (Single Top 100)	4
Sweden (Sverigetopplistan)	2
Switzerland (Schweizer Hitparade)	10
UK Singles (Official Charts)	46
West Germany (GfK)	18

== Legacy ==
- The Swedish heavy metal band Black Ingvars covered "Diggi-Loo Diggi-Ley" on their 1998 album Schlager Metal.
- Meiju Suvas has recorded a version in Finnish.
- The Danish duo Small Talk released an English cover version on their 2001 album Eurovision.

Preceded by "Främling" by Carola Häggkvist	Melodifestivalen winners 1984	Succeeded by "Bra vibrationer" by Kikki Danielsson
Preceded by "Si la vie est cadeau" by Corinne Hermès	Eurovision Song Contest winners 1984	Succeeded by "La det swinge" by Bobbysocks
