= Switzerland in the Eurovision Song Contest 1984 =

- Eurovision Song Contest 1984
- Participating broadcaster: Swiss Broadcasting Corporation (SRG SSR)
- Country: Switzerland
- Selection process: Concorso Eurovisione della Canzone '84: Finale Svizzera
- Selection date: 4 February 1984

Competing entry
- Song: "Welche Farbe hat der Sonnenschein"
- Artist: Rainy Day
- Songwriter: Günther Loose

Placement
- Final result: 16th, 30 points

Participation chronology

Switzerland was represented at the Eurovision Song Contest 1984 with the song "Welche Farbe hat der Sonnenschein", written by Günther Loose, and performed by the group Rainy Day. The Swiss participating broadcaster, the Swiss Broadcasting Corporation (SRG SSR), selected its entry for the contest through a national final.

== Before Eurovision ==
=== Regional selections ===
The Swiss Broadcasting Corporation (SRG SSR) held a national final to select its entry for the Eurovision Song Contest 1984. The national final was a collaboration between three broadcasters that comprised SRG SSR: the Swiss-German and Romansh broadcaster Schweizer Fernsehen der deutschen und rätoromanischen Schweiz (SF DRS), the Swiss-French broadcaster Télévision suisse romande (TSR), and the Swiss-Italian broadcaster Televisione svizzera di lingua italiana (TSI). Since 1982, unlike previous Swiss national finals, where all composite broadcasters internally selected their entries, a public preliminary round was held by one of the regional broadcasters. SF DRS held a preselection to select its three entries, while TSR and TSI internally selected their entries. Eligible songs were required to have been composed by songwriters from Switzerland or Liechtenstein, and the deadline for the song registrations for the Swiss-German and Swiss-Italian broadcasters was on 15 October, 1983, whereas the deadline for the Swiss-French broadcaster was on 30 October.

==== Swiss-German and Romansh selection ====
A total of 114 songs were submitted to SF DRS. An internal jury was tasked to select at most 20 entries for the preliminary round, and ultimately selected 16 songs. The preselection was held on 17 December 1983 and was hosted by Ueli Beck. The show was broadcast only on radio at 19:30 (CET) on DRS 1. The voting consisted of phone calls from radio listeners and the three radio stations of SF DRS (DRS 1, DRS 2 Kultur, and DRS 3) with an equal voting weight. The three highest scoring songs advanced to the national final in Lugano.

Of the sixteen songs, only fourteen of the participants are known to be reported, meaning two artists remain unknown. Additionally, it was reported that "Friede - ich wart uf die Zyt" by Baldrian received the most votes from the public while Bernadette received a low score. Known information regarding the lineup of this preliminary round is listed as follows.

Swiss-German and Romansh preliminary round — 17 December 1983 (known songs)
Artist(s)	Song	Songwriter(s)	Result
Andy L.	"Musika"	Andy Lütolf; Peter Reber	Qualified
Angela Ricardi	Unknown		—N/a
Baldrian	"Friede - ich wart uf die Zyt"	Andreas Ott; Mark Wolfangel; Martin Ott	—N/a
Bernadette	Unknown		—N/a
Bernadette	Unknown		—N/a
Brigitte Ammenn	"Einander lieben"	Unknown	—N/a
Corinne Hobi	"Sempre tu"	Unknown	—N/a
Hades	"Arva tes egls"	René Spescha; Gieri Spescha	—N/a
Ireen Indra	Unknown		—N/a
Jacob Stickelberger	Unknown		—N/a
Jacob Stickelberger	Unknown		—N/a
Manuela Felice	"Wo die Lieder sind"	Claudia Felice; Manuela Felice; Peter Sigrist	Qualified
Rainy Day	"Welche Farbe hat der Sonnenschein"	Günter Loose	Qualified
Vanessa Kim	Unknown		—N/a

=== Concorso Eurovisione della Canzone '84: Finale Svizzera ===
The broadcaster received 206 total song submissions (114 in German and 46 in French and Italian), and ultimately selected nine to take part in the selection (three per language). Among the participants were Arlette Zola, who represented Switzerland in 1982, and Carol Rich, who would later represent Switzerland in 1987.

Swiss Italian broadcaster Televisione svizzera di lingua italiana (TSI) staged the national final on 4 February at 21:00 CET at its studios in Lugano. It was hosted by Ezio Guidi and Natascha Giller, with Mario Robbiani accompanying the orchestra. The national final was broadcast on TV DRS (with commentary by Max Rüeger), TSR (with commentary by Serge Moisson) and on TSI. Corinne Hermès, who won Eurovision for Luxembourg in 1983, made a guest appearance.

Participating entries
Broadcaster	Artist(s)	Song	Songwriter(s)		Language
Broadcaster	Artist(s)	Song	Composer(s)	Lyricist	Language
RTSI	Mauro Monti and Nando Morandi	"Liberi"	Mauro Monti	Nando Morandi	Italian
RTSI	Milo & Pina	"Piccola sarà"	Olivia Gray	Corry Knobel	Italian
RTSI	Krypton	"Per te"	Urban Meier	Daniel Stöhr	Italian
SF DRS	Andy L.	"Musica"	Peter Reber	Andy Lütolf	German
SF DRS	Manuela Felice	"Wo die Lieder sind"	Manuela Felice; Peter Sigrist	Claudia Felice	German
SF DRS	Rainy Day	"Welche Farbe hat der Sonnenschein"	Günter Loose		German
TSR	Martin Richard Trio	"Vivre d'amour"	Philip Martin	Martin Richard	French
TSR	Carol Rich	"Tokyo Boy"	Jean-Jacques Egli		French
TSR	Arlette Zola	"Emporte-moi"	Alain Morisod	Pierre Alain	French

The voting consisted of a public jury combined from the regional public votes which were sent from the three divisions of SRG SSR (DRS, TSR, TSI: German, French, and Italian speaking, respectively), a press jury, and a jury of music experts. Applications for viewers from Switzerland and Liechtenstein to join the regional juries were sent via postcard until 23 January, and 50 viewers from each canton were randomly selected to cast their votes to their broadcaster divisions via phone call. Additionally, one random voter in the public jury would be drawn to be invited to attend the Eurovision Song Contest as an audience member along with a companion. The selected voter was Marianne Mueller from Aarburg. The winner was the song "Welche Farbe hat der Sonnenschein", written by Günther Loose and performed by Rainy Day.

Final — 4 February 1984
R/O	Artist(s)	Song	Public Juries	Press Jury	Expert Jury	Total	Place
1	Nando Morandi and Mauro Monti	"Liberi"	4	8	5	17	5
2	Andy L.	"Musica"	7	7	1	15	6
3	Milo and Pina	"Piccola sarà"	1	2	2	5	9
4	Martin Richard Trio	"Vivre d'amour"	3	3	3	9	8
5	Carol Rich	"Tokyo Boy"	5	1	7	13	7
6	Manuela Felice	"Wo die Lieder sind"	10	4	4	18	3
7	Krypton	"Per te"	2	10	8	20	2
8	Arlette Zola	"Emporte-moi"	6	6	6	18	3
9	Rainy Day	"Welche Farbe hat der Sonnenschein"	8	6	10	24	1

Detailed Regional Jury Votes
R/O	Song	DRS	TSR	TSI	Total	Points
1	"Liberi"	5	4	5	14	4
2	"Musica"	8	8	7	23	7
3	"Piccola sarà"	1	1	1	3	1
4	"Vivre d'amour"	7	3	3	13	3
5	"Tokyo Boy"	6	5	4	15	5
6	"Wo die Lieder sind"	5	10	10	25	10
7	"Per te"	2	3	2	7	2
8	"Emporte-moi"	3	7	6	16	6
9	"Welche Farbe hat der Sonnenschein"	10	6	8	24	8

== At Eurovision ==
At the Eurovision Song Contest 1984, held at the Théâtre Municipal in Luxembourg City, the Swiss entry was the seventeenth entry of the night following Finland and preceding Italy. The Swiss conductor at the contest was Mario Robbiani, who previously composed and conducted several Swiss-Italian songs in the contest. At the close of voting, Switzerland had received 30 points, placing Switzerland in sixteenth place out of nineteenth entries.

=== Voting ===
Each participating broadcaster assembled a jury panel with at least eleven members. The jurors awarded 1-8, 10, and 12 points to their top ten songs.

Points awarded to Switzerland
Score	Country
12 points	
10 points	United Kingdom
8 points	Denmark
7 points	
6 points	
5 points	Belgium
4 points	Italy
3 points	
2 points	
1 point	Cyprus; Finland; Sweden

Points awarded by Switzerland
Score	Country
12 points	Ireland
10 points	Sweden
8 points	Portugal
7 points	Italy
6 points	Turkey
5 points	Netherlands
4 points	France
3 points	Spain
2 points	Norway
1 point	Denmark
