= Yugoslavia in the Eurovision Song Contest 1984 =

- Eurovision Song Contest 1984
- Participating broadcaster: Jugoslavenska radiotelevizija (JRT)
- Country: Yugoslavia
- Selection process: Jugovizija 1984
- Selection date: 23 March 1984

Competing entry
- Song: "Ciao, amore"
- Artist: Ida & Vlado
- Songwriters: Slobodan Bučevac; Milan Perić

Placement
- Final result: 18th, 26 points

Participation chronology

Yugoslavia was represented at the Eurovision Song Contest 1984 with the song "Ciao, amore", composed by Slobodan Bučevac, with lyrics by Milan Perić, and performed by Ida & Vlado. The Yugoslavian participating broadcaster, Jugoslavenska radiotelevizija (JRT), selected its entry through Jugovizija 1984.

== Before Eurovision ==
=== Jugovizija 1984 ===
The Yugoslavian national final to select their entry, Jugovizija 1984, was held on 23 March at the Universal Hall in Skopje, and was hosted by Blagoja Krstevski and Ljiljana Trajkovska.

Each of the eight Jugoslavenska radiotelevizija (JRT) participating sub-national broadcasters (RTV Sarajevo, RTV Skopje, RTV Novi Sad, RTV Titograd, RTV Zagreb, RTV Belgrade, RTV Ljubljana, and RTV Pristina) entered two songs to Jugovizija, making a national final of sixteen songs. The winner was decided by the votes of the regional juries of the eight broadcasters, which could not vote for their own entries.

The winner was "Ljubavna priča br. 1" representing RTV Titograd, written by Slobodan Bučevac and Milan Perić, and performed by Ida and Vlado.

Jugovizija 1984 – 23 March 1984
R/O	Broadcaster	Artist	Song	Points	Place
1	(Socialist Republic of Serbia) RTV Novi Sad	Sunčeve pege	"Emanuela"	4	15
2	(Socialist Republic of Bosnia and Herzegovina) RTV Sarajevo	Rondo	"Linda"	26	10
3	(Socialist Republic of Serbia) RTV Pristina	Vera Oruqaj and Haki Misini	"Fryti i dashurisë"	2	16
4	(Socialist Republic of Serbia) RTV Novi Sad	Bisera Veletanlić	"Nisam protiv"	12	14
5	(Socialist Republic of Slovenia) RTV Ljubljana	Branka Kraner	"Nisem verjela"	15	12
6	(Socialist Republic of Macedonia) RTV Skopje	Maja Odžaklievska	"Niki"	51	2
7	(Socialist Republic of Serbia) RTV Belgrade	Šeri	"Italijanski restoran"	33	8
8	(Socialist Republic of Bosnia and Herzegovina) RTV Sarajevo	Jasna Gospić	"Hula-hop"	18	11
9	(Socialist Republic of Macedonia) RTV Skopje	Spektar	"Opasna zona"	15	12
10	(Socialist Republic of Serbia) RTV Belgrade	Slađana and Dado	"Negde izvan planeta"	38	6
11	(Socialist Republic of Croatia) RTV Zagreb	Daniel	"Marija"	40	4
12	(Socialist Republic of Slovenia) RTV Ljubljana	Rendez-Vous	"O ne cheri"	48	3
13	(Socialist Republic of Serbia) RTV Pristina	Alen Slavica	"Merijen"	40	4
14	(Socialist Republic of Montenegro) RTV Titograd	Ida and Vlado	"Ljubavna priča br. 1"	56	1
15	(Socialist Republic of Montenegro) RTV Titograd	Makadam	"Talas ljubavi"	38	6
16	(Socialist Republic of Croatia) RTV Zagreb	Grupa 777	"Zbogom"	28	9

Detailed Regional Jury Votes
R/O	Song	RTV Novi Sad	RTV Sarajevo	RTV Pristina	RTV Ljubljana	RTV Skopje	RTV Belgrade	RTV Zagreb	RTV Titograd	Points
1	"Emanuela"								4	4
2	"Linda"	6				5	2	7	6	26
3	"Fryti i dashurisë"								2	2
4	"Nisam protiv"			1		2	6		3	12
5	"Nisem verjela"	1	1	12		1				15
6	"Niki"	12	5	2	8		8	8	8	51
7	"Italijanski restoran"	7	2	6	4	6		1	7	33
8	"Hula-hop"			5	3		5	4	1	18
9	"Opasna zona"			7	1			2	5	15
10	"Negde izvan planeta"	10	8		7	7		6		38
11	"Marija"	8	10	4	6	8	4			40
12	"O ne cheri"	5	6	3		12	10	12		48
13	"Merijen"	3	7		2	3	3	10	12	40
14	"Ljubavna priča br. 1"	4	12	10	10	10	7	3		56
15	"Talas ljubavi"	2	3		12	4	12	5		38
16	"Zbogom"		4	8	5		1		10	28

=== Controversy ===
There were suspicions of irregularities in the voting process, with claims of unfair manipulation, bias, and organizational errors during the voting. Disputes arose between various television centers, with some accusing others of violating voting norms, while others defended the regularity of the process. Despite the allegations, officials from these centers denied any intentional manipulation and affirmed that the voting followed the established procedures.

== At Eurovision ==
The contest was broadcast by TV Beograd 1, TV Novi Sad, TV Titograd 1, TV Zagreb 1 (all with commentary by Oliver Mlakar), TV Koper-Capodistria, TV Ljubljana 1 (with Slovenian commentary), TV Skopje 1, and TV Prishtina.

"Ljubavna priča br. 1" was renamed to "Ciao, amore" on the night of the contest, where Yugoslavia performed 12th, following Netherlands and preceding Austria. At the close of voting, Yugoslavia received 26 points, placing 18th out of 19 entries, ahead of only Austria. The Yugoslav jury awarded its 12 points to Cyprus.

=== Voting ===
Points awarded to Yugoslavia
Score	Country
12 points	
10 points	
8 points	Cyprus; Turkey
7 points	
6 points	
5 points	
4 points	
3 points	Germany; United Kingdom
2 points	Finland; France
1 point	

Points awarded by Yugoslavia
Score	Country
12 points	Cyprus
10 points	Turkey
8 points	Luxembourg
7 points	Portugal
6 points	Denmark
5 points	Netherlands
4 points	Sweden
3 points	Finland
2 points	Spain
1 point	United Kingdom
