= Jacques Zegers =

- Born: 25 June 1947 (age 78)
- Origin: Brussels, Belgium
- Genres: Pop
- Occupation: Singer

Jacques Zegers (born 25 June 1947, Brussels) is a Belgian singer, best known for his participation in the 1984 Eurovision Song Contest.

== Early career ==
Born in Brussels to a Belgian mother and French father, Zegers began singing in cabaret at the age of 16 and in his spare time would participate in song contests while pursuing a career as a journalist. He released two singles, "La nuit" and "Pour elle", in 1983. He was then asked to record "LA en Olympie", the official Belgian song for the 1984 Summer Olympics.

== Eurovision Song Contest ==
In 1984, Zegers's song "Avanti la vie" was chosen as the Belgian representative in the 29th Eurovision Song Contest which took place on 5 May in Luxembourg City. "Avanti la vie" scored 70 points to finish in fifth place of 19 entries.

== Later career ==
After Eurovision, Zegers released one more single, "1001 amis", and continued to pursue his journalistic career. He published a novel entitled Le nœud and several volumes of poetry.

== Discography ==
Singles

- "La nuit" (1983)
- "Pour elle" (1983)
- "LA en Olympie" (1984)
- "Avanti la vie" (1984)
- "1001 amis" (1984)

Preceded by Pas de Deux with "Rendez-vous"	Belgium in the Eurovision Song Contest; 1984	Succeeded by Linda Lepomme with "Laat me nu gaan"
