= Izolda Barudžija =

Yugoslav musician

Izolda Barudžija (Serbian Cyrillic: Изолда Баруџија, pronounced [izǒlda barǔdʒija]), also known as Isolda or Ida, is a Serbian and former Yugoslav singer born in Belgrade.

From 1978 to 1982, she sang in the student choir Branko Krsmanović in Belgrade and had a solo part in the vocal group Pop polifonija (Pop Polyphony) as well as a variety of live TV and Radio performances such as with Jazz Orchestra Radio Belgrade. She represented Yugoslavia in the Eurovision Song Contest 1982 with her band Aska, and finished in 14th place. In 1983, she and her sister Eleonora were Daniel Popović's backing vocals; their song "Džuli" placed 4th and became a huge hit. In 1984, she and Vlado Kalember, performing as "Ida & Vlado", came 18th with the song "Ciao, amore". The video for "Ciao, amore" was not broadcast on Turkish state television because Barudžija appeared bathing topless.

After her Eurovision duet with Vlado Kalember, Izolda and Eleonora started their professional career as a duo. They released many songs and also, they took part in many music festivals such as Zagrebfest and MESAM, both solo and as a duo. Thanks to that, the duo gained popularity.

In 1992, Izolda and her sister participated together in the Jugovizija, trying to represent rump Yugoslavia (Serbia and Montenegro) with the song "Hej hej, vrati se", which ended in the 12th place. After that, the duo dissolved, and Eleonora started her solo career. Between 1994 and 2011, Izolda was a solo singer and lyricist in the band VOX.

She is married to Serbian guitarist and singer Zlatko Manojlović and they live in Germany, where she moved in 2001 when her husband signed a contract to work as a producer and composer in Mannheim. Since 2009, she teaches at Music Academy in Düsseldorf.

| Preceded by Vajta | Yugoslavia in the Eurovision Song Contest (as part of Aska); 1982 | Succeeded by Daniel |
| Preceded by Daniel | Yugoslavia in the Eurovision Song Contest (with Vlado Kalember); 1984 | Succeeded by Doris Dragović |
