= Eurovision Song Contest 1984 =

International song competition

Date and venue
- Final: 5 May 1984
- Venue: Théâtre Municipal; Luxembourg City, Luxembourg

Organisation
- Organiser: European Broadcasting Union (EBU)
- Scrutineer: Frank Naef

Production
- Host broadcaster: Radio Télévision Luxembourg (RTL)
- Director: René Steichen
- Executive producer: Ray van Cant
- Musical director: Pierre Cao
- Presenter: Désirée Nosbusch

Participants
- Number of entries: 19
- Returning countries: Ireland
- Non-returning countries: Greece; Israel
- Participation map: Competing countries Countries that participated in the past but not in 1984

Vote
- Voting system: Each country awarded 12, 10, 8-1 point(s) to their ten favourite songs
- Winning song: Sweden "Diggi-Loo Diggi-Ley"

The Eurovision Song Contest 1984 was the 29th edition of the Eurovision Song Contest, held on 5 May 1984 at the Théâtre Municipal in Luxembourg City, Luxembourg, and presented by Désirée Nosbusch. It was organised by the European Broadcasting Union (EBU) and host broadcaster Radio Télévision Luxembourg (RTL), who staged the event after winning the 1983 contest for Luxembourg with the song "Si la vie est cadeau" by Corinne Hermès. Nosbusch, who was 19 years old, remains the youngest person to have hosted the contest as of 2025.

Broadcasters from nineteen countries participated in the contest, with Ireland returning after a one-year absence, and Greece and Israel, which had participated in the previous year's event, declining to enter. The winner was Sweden with the song "Diggi-Loo Diggi-Ley", composed by Torgny Söderberg, written by Britt Lindeborg and performed by the group Herreys. This was Sweden's second contest victory, coming ten years after ABBA's win in the 1974 contest. Ireland finished as runner-up, Spain and Denmark placed third and fourth, respectively, and Belgium and Italy tied for fifth place.

== Location ==
Théâtre Municipal, Luxembourg City – host venue of the 1984 contest

The 1984 contest took place in Luxembourg City, Luxembourg, following the country's victory at the 1983 contest with the song "Si la vie est cadeau" performed by Corinne Hermès. It was the fourth time that Luxembourg had hosted the event, following the contests held in 1962, 1966 and 1973. The chosen venue was the Grand Théâtre, also known as the Nouveau Théâtre or Théâtre Municipal, an arts venue inaugurated in 1964, and which had previously hosted the contest in 1973. Luxembourgish broadcaster Radio Télévision Luxembourg (RTL) initially had difficulty in finding a suitable venue to host the contest and eventually settled on the Grand Théâtre, which was smaller compared to the venue used at the 1983 contest. The theatre's main auditorium usually holds an audience around 950 people, however this was reduced with the addition of technical equipment and commentator's boxes. As a result, only press, members of each country's delegation and diplomatic representatives were allowed to watch the live show at the venue.

== Participants ==
Eurovision Song Contest 1984 – Participation summaries by country
- Austria; Belgium; Cyprus; Denmark; Finland; France; Germany; Ireland; Italy; Luxembourg; Netherlands; Norway; Portugal; Spain; Sweden; Switzerland; Turkey; United Kingdom; Yugoslavia

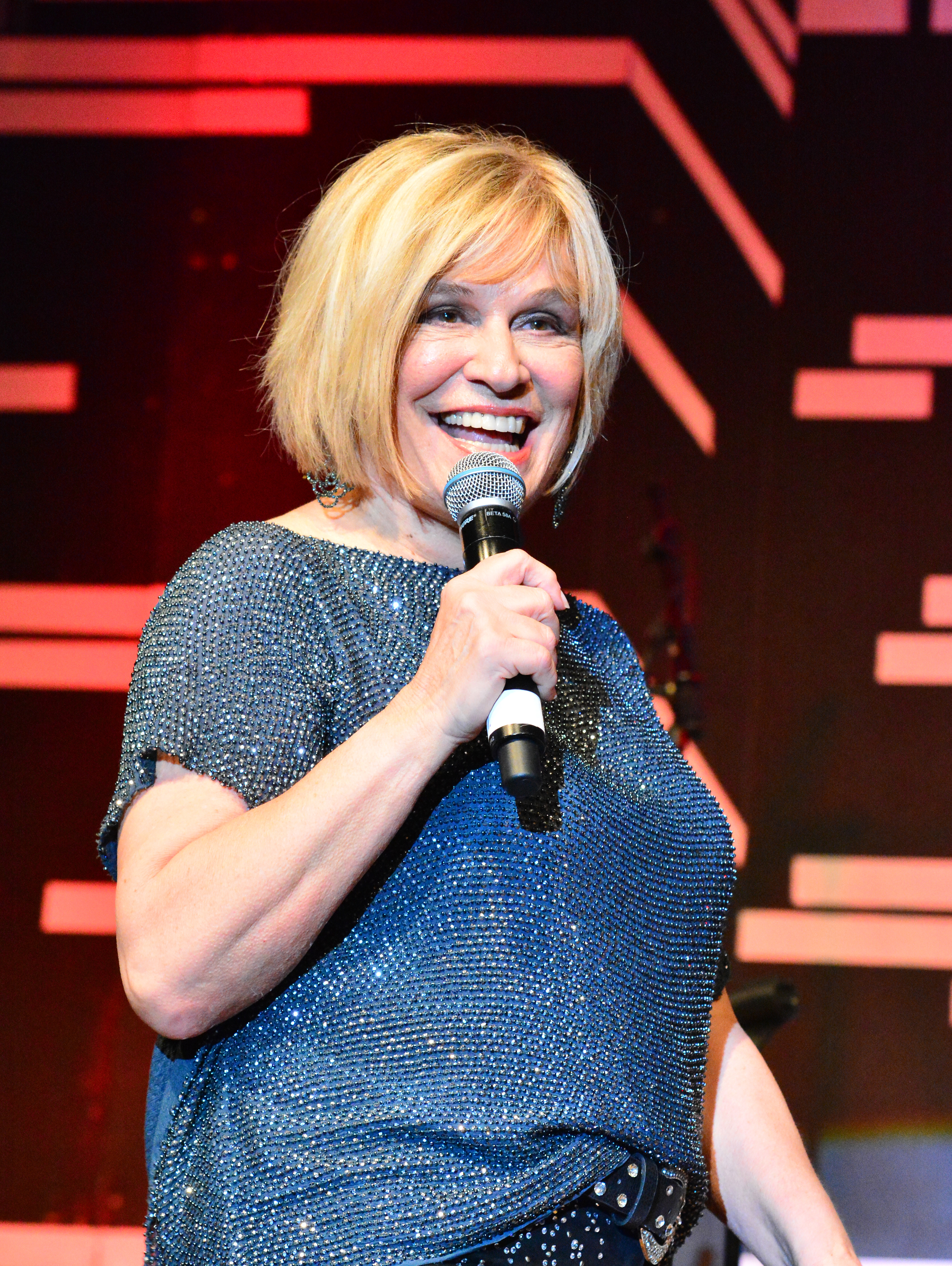
Mary Roos (pictured in 2015) represented Germany for the second time, having previously come third in 1972.

Entries from a total of 19 countries participated in the event. Ireland returned to the contest after a one-year absence, however Israel and Greece decided not to participate. The Israel Broadcasting Authority (IBA) declined to enter as the date of the contest coincided with Yom HaZikaron, while the Hellenic Broadcasting Corporation (ERT), which had originally planned to participate in the contest, reportedly withdrew as the quality of the songs submitted for consideration was deemed to be of too low a quality.

A number of the participating artists in this year's event had previously competed in past editions of the contest. Mary Roos had finished third for Germany in 1972 and made a second appearance for the country in 1984; Izolda Barudžija, who had been a member of the group Aska that represented Yugoslavia in 1982, participated again this year alongside Vlado Kalember; Kit Rolfe, lead singer of Belle and the Devotions, had previously performed as a backing vocalist for the United Kingdom in 1983, and Gary Lux, who had represented Austria in 1983 as a member of the group Westend, returned as a backing vocalist for the Austrian singer Anita.

Eurovision Song Contest 1984 participants
Country	Broadcaster	Artist	Song	Language	Songwriter(s)	Conductor
Austria	ORF	Anita	"Einfach weg"	German	Walter Müller; Brigitte Seuberth	Richard Oesterreicher
Belgium	RTBF	Jacques Zegers	"Avanti la vie"	French	Henri Seroka; Jacques Zegers	Jo Carlier
Cyprus	CyBC	Andy Paul	"Anna Mari-Elena" (Άννα Μαρί-Έλενα)	Greek	Andy Paul	Pierre Cao
Denmark	DR	Hot Eyes	"Det' lige det"	Danish	Søren Bundgaard; Keld Heick	Henrik Krogsgaard
Finland	YLE	Kirka	"Hengaillaan"	Finnish	Jukka Siikavire; Jussi Tuominen	Ossi Runne
France	Antenne 2	Annick Thoumazeau	"Autant d'amoureux que d'étoiles"	French	Vladimir Cosma; Charles Level	François Rauber
Germany	BR (Note: On behalf of the German public broadcasting consortium ARD)	Mary Roos	"Aufrecht geh'n"	German	Michael Kunze; Michael Reinecke	Pierre Cao
Ireland	RTÉ	Linda Martin	"Terminal 3"	English	Johnny Logan	Noel Kelehan
Italy	RAI	Alice and Franco Battiato	"I treni di Tozeur"	Italian	Franco Battiato; Rosario Cosentino; Giusto Pio	Giusto Pio
Luxembourg	CLT	Sophie Carle	"100% d'amour"	French	Jean-Michel Bériat; Jean-Pierre Goussaud; Patrick Jaymes	Pascal Stive
Netherlands	NOS	Maribelle	"Ik hou van jou"	Dutch	Peter van Asten; Richard de Bois	Rogier van Otterloo
Norway	NRK	Dollie de Luxe	"Lenge leve livet"	Norwegian	Benedicte Adrian; Ingrid Bjørnov	Sigurd Jansen
Portugal	RTP	Maria Guinot	"Silêncio e tanta gente"	Portuguese	Maria Guinot	Pedro Osório
Spain	TVE	Bravo	"Lady, Lady"	Spanish	Miguel Blasco; Amaya Saizar	Eddy Guerin
Sweden	SVT	Herreys	"Diggi-Loo Diggi-Ley"	Swedish	Britt Lindeborg; Torgny Söderberg	Curt-Eric Holmquist
Switzerland	SRG SSR	Rainy Day	"Welche Farbe hat der Sonnenschein"	German	Günter Loose	Mario Robbiani
Turkey	TRT	Beş Yıl Önce, On Yıl Sonra	"Halay"	Turkish	Ülkü Aker; Selçuk Başar	Selçuk Başar
United Kingdom	BBC	Belle and the Devotions	"Love Games"	English	Paul Curtis; Graham Sacher	John Coleman
Yugoslavia	JRT	Ida and Vlado	"Ciao, amore"	Serbo-Croatian	Slobodan Bučevac; Milan Perić	Mato Došen

== Production and format ==
The Eurovision Song Contest 1984 was produced by the Luxembourgish public broadcaster Radio Télévision Luxembourg (RTL). Ray van Cant served as executive producer, Hubert Terheggen served as producer, René Steichen served as director, Roland de Groot served as designer, and Pierre Cao served as musical director, leading the orchestra. A separate musical director could be nominated by each participating delegation to lead the orchestra during its country's performance, with the host musical director also available to conduct for those countries which did not nominate their own conductor. On behalf of the European Broadcasting Union (EBU), the event was overseen by Frank Naef as scrutineer. The overall costs to organise the event were around 35 million Luxembourgish francs.

Each participating broadcaster submitted one song, which was required to be no longer than three minutes in duration and performed in the language, or one of the languages, of the country which it represented. A maximum of six performers were allowed on stage during each country's performance. Each entry could utilise all or part of the live orchestra and could use instrumental-only backing tracks, however any backing tracks used could only include the sound of instruments featured on stage being mimed by the performers.

The results of the 1984 contest were determined through the same scoring system as had first been introduced in 1975: each country awarded twelve points to its favourite entry, followed by ten points to its second favourite, and then awarded points in decreasing value from eight to one for the remaining songs which featured in the country's top ten, with countries unable to vote for their own entry. The points awarded by each country were determined by an assembled jury of 11 individuals, who were all required to be members of the public with no connection to the music industry, with a recommendation that there should be a balance between the sexes and that half should be under 25 years old. Each jury member voted in secret and awarded between one and five votes to each participating song, excluding that from their own country and with no abstentions permitted. The votes of each member were collected following the country's performance and then tallied by the non-voting jury chairperson to determine the points to be awarded. In any cases where two or more songs in the top ten received the same number of votes, a show of hands by all jury members was used to determine the final placing.

Rehearsals for the participating artists began on 30 April 1984. Two technical rehearsals were conducted for each participating delegation in the week approaching the contest, with countries rehearsing in the order in which they would perform. The first rehearsals of 40 minutes were held on 30 April and 1 May 1984, followed by a press conference for each delegation and the accredited press. Each country's second rehearsals were held on 2 and 3 May and lasted 20 minutes total. Three dress rehearsals were held with all artists, two held in the afternoon and evening of 4 May and one final rehearsal in the afternoon of 5 May, with an invited audience present for the second dress rehearsal.

Dutch designer Roland de Groot was in charge of the set design of the contest for the fourth time, having previously done so 1970, 1976, and 1980, the three previous contests staged in the Netherlands. For the 1984 contest, de Groot's design centred around various shapes which were suspended over the performance area on a series of pulleys and which could be moved around the stage in between the competing acts; this allowed for different backdrops to be created for each entry. Each entry was preceded by a video postcard which served as an introduction to that country, as well as creating a transition between entries to allow stage crew to make changes on stage. The postcards for the 1984 contest featured a troupe of actors referred to during the contest as "the Tourists", and focused on the various cultural stereotypes of each of the competing countries and portrayed these a humorous context, often with heavy use of computer animation.

== Contest overview ==
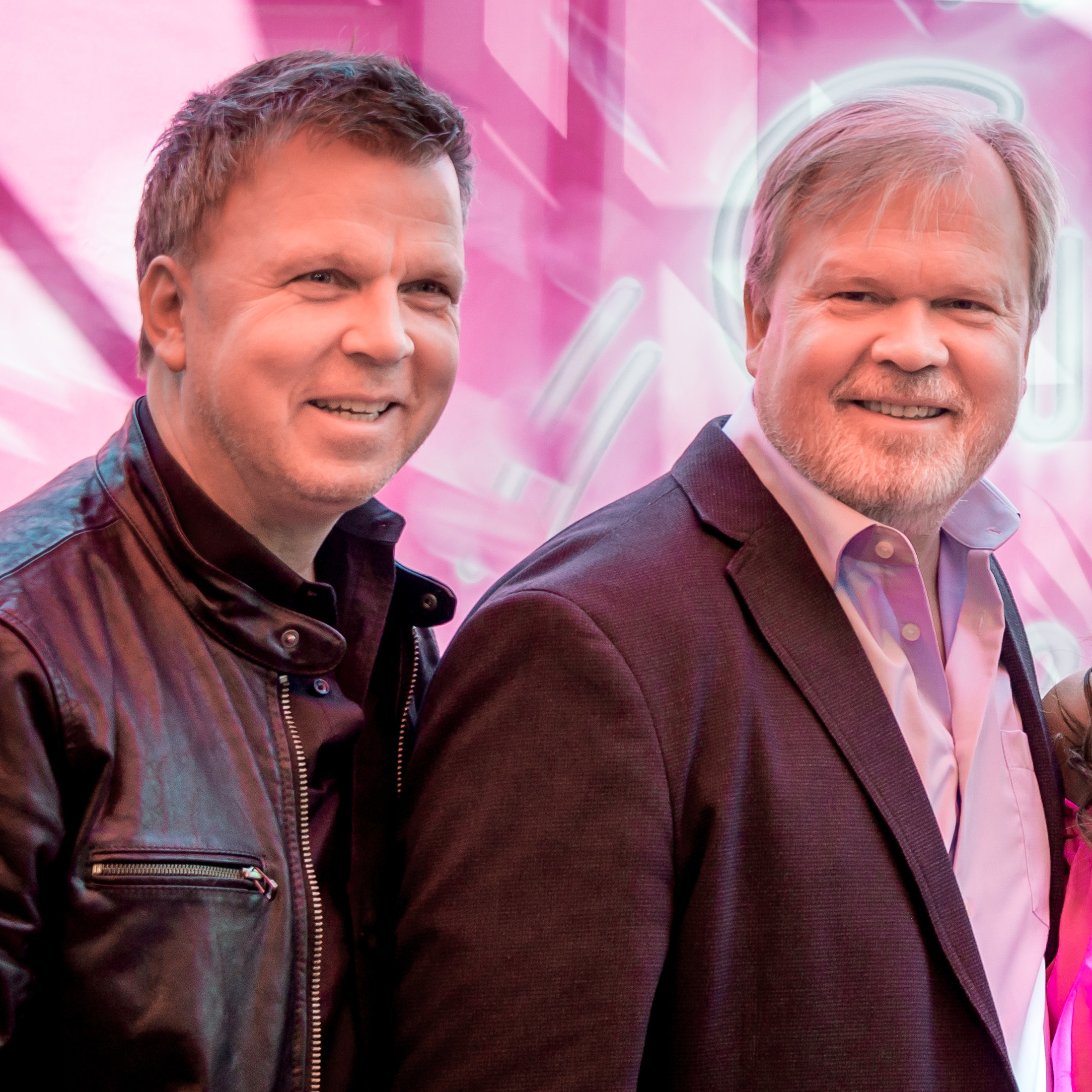
Richard (left) and Per Herrey, two of the three Herrey brothers, who were Sweden's second contest winning act (pictured in 2016)

The contest was held on 5 May 1984, beginning at 21:00 (CEST) and lasting 2 hours and 12 minutes. The event was presented by the Luxembourgish television presenter and actress Désirée Nosbusch, who compèred the contest in French, German, Luxembourgish, and English; at 19 years old, Nosbusch remains the youngest individual to have hosted the Eurovision Song Contest as of 2024. Among the invited guests present in the audience was Prince Henri, then heir to the Luxembourger throne. The contest's interval act featured a performance by the Prague Theatre of Illuminated Drawings. The medallions awarded to the winners were presented by the previous year's winning artist Corinne Hermès.

The 1984 contest featured one of the first instances of booing to be heard at the Eurovision Song Contest, which occurred immediately after the UK's entry. Various reasons for the booing have been proposed: these include being a response to football hooliganism which occurred in Luxembourg by English football fans during the qualifying stage of the 1984 European Championship, the use of off-stage backing vocalists during the UK's performance which gave an impression that members of Belle and the Devotions were lip syncing, and allegations that their song, "Love Games", which was heavily inspired by 1960s Motown tracks, had plagiarised previous tracks by the Supremes.

The winner was Sweden represented by the song "Diggi-Loo Diggi-Ley", composed by Torgny Söderberg, written by Britt Lindeborg and performed by Herreys, comprising brothers Per, Richard and Louis Herrey. It was Sweden's second contest win, ten years after ABBA's victory in 1974. It was also the third – and, as of 2025, last – time that the winning entry was the first to be performed, following the 1975 and 1976 contests. During the traditional winner's reprise performance, the group sung part of the winning song in English, with lyrics written by Per Herrey.

Results of the Eurovision Song Contest 1984
R/O	Country	Artist	Song	Points	Place
1	Sweden	Herreys	"Diggi-Loo Diggi-Ley"	145	1
2	Luxembourg	Sophie Carle	"100% d'amour"	39	10
3	France	Annick Thoumazeau	"Autant d'amoureux que d'étoiles"	61	8
4	Spain	Bravo	"Lady, Lady"	106	3
5	Norway	Dollie de Luxe	"Lenge leve livet"	29	17
6	United Kingdom	Belle and the Devotions	"Love Games"	63	7
7	Cyprus	Andy Paul	"Anna Maria-Lena"	31	15
8	Belgium	Jacques Zegers	"Avanti la vie"	70	5
9	Ireland	Linda Martin	"Terminal 3"	137	2
10	Denmark	Hot Eyes	"Det' lige det"	101	4
11	Netherlands	Maribelle	"Ik hou van jou"	34	13
12	Yugoslavia	Ida and Vlado	"Ciao, amore"	26	18
13	Austria	Anita	"Einfach weg"	5	19
14	Germany	Mary Roos	"Aufrecht geh'n"	34	13
15	Turkey	Beş Yıl Önce, On Yıl Sonra	"Halay"	37	12
16	Finland	Kirka	"Hengaillaan"	46	9
17	Switzerland	Rainy Day	"Welche Farbe hat der Sonnenschein"	30	16
18	Italy	Alice and Franco Battiato	"I treni di Tozeur"	70	5
19	Portugal	Maria Guinot	"Silêncio e tanta gente"	38	11

=== Spokespersons ===
Each participating broadcaster appointed a spokesperson, connected to the contest venue via telephone lines and responsible for announcing, in English or French, the votes for its respective country. Known spokespersons at the 1984 contest are listed below.

- Finland – Solveig Herlin
- Netherlands – Flip van der Schalie
- Sweden – Agneta Bolme Börjefors
- Turkey – Başak Doğru
- United Kingdom – Colin Berry

== Detailed voting results ==
Jury voting was used to determine the points awarded by all countries. The announcement of the results from each country was conducted in the order in which they performed, with the spokespersons announcing their country's points in English or French in ascending order. The detailed breakdown of the points awarded by each country is listed in the tables below.

Detailed voting results of the Eurovision Song Contest 1984
		Total score	Sweden	Luxembourg	France	Spain	Norway	United Kingdom	Cyprus	Belgium	Ireland	Denmark	Netherlands	Yugoslavia	Austria	Germany	Turkey	Finland	Switzerland	Italy	Portugal
Contestants	Sweden	**145**		6	6	4	10	7	**12**	7	**12**	**12**	10	4	**12**	**12**	3	8	10	6	4
Contestants	Luxembourg	39				7			7		5	5		8			4			3	
Contestants	France	61	2				2	6	3	10			**12**		8				4	7	7
Contestants	Spain	106	10	8	10		6	4	6	3	7	7	2	2	6		**12**		3	8	**12**
Contestants	Norway	29	8	7						1	3					2		6	2		
Contestants	United Kingdom	63	3	1		3	8		2	2	8	1	4	1	2	7	1	4		10	6
Contestants	Cyprus	31	4		1						4	10		**12**							
Contestants	Belgium	70		**12**	**12**	2	3						8		3	4	5	10		1	10
Contestants	Ireland	137	**12**	5	3	10	4	8	10	**12**		3	7		10	10	10	7	**12**	**12**	2
Contestants	Denmark	101	5	3	8	6	**12**	**12**	5	8	10		3	6	4	5	2	5	1	5	1
Contestants	Netherlands	34		2	7	8		1			6			5					5		
Contestants	Yugoslavia	26			2			3	8							3	8	2			
Contestants	Austria	5									1	4									
Contestants	Germany	34			4		7	2		6		2	5		1					2	5
Contestants	Turkey	37	6					5		4	2		1	10				3	6		
Contestants	Finland	46	7		5	1	5		4			6		3	5	1	6				3
Contestants	Switzerland	30	1					10	1	5		8						1		4	
Contestants	Italy	70		10		**12**	1								7	6	7	**12**	7		8
Contestants	Portugal	38		4		5							6	7		8			8		

=== 12 points ===
The below table summarises how the maximum 12 points were awarded from one country to another. The winning country is shown in bold. Sweden received the maximum score of 12 points from five of the voting countries, with Ireland receiving four sets of 12 points, Belgium, Denmark, Italy and Spain each receiving two sets of 12 points, and Cyprus and France receiving one maximum score each.

Distribution of 12 points awarded at the Eurovision Song Contest 1984
N.	Contestant	Nation(s) giving 12 points
5	**Sweden**	Austria, Cyprus, Denmark, Germany, Ireland
4	Ireland	Belgium, Italy, Sweden, Switzerland
2	Belgium	France, Luxembourg
2	Denmark	Norway, United Kingdom
2	Italy	Spain, Finland
2	Spain	Portugal, Turkey
1	Cyprus	Yugoslavia
1	France	Netherlands

== Broadcasts ==
Each participating broadcaster was required to relay the contest via its networks. Non-participating member broadcasters were also able to relay the contest as "passive participants". Broadcasters were able to send commentators to provide coverage of the contest in their own native language and to relay information about the artists and songs to their viewers. These commentators were typically sent to the venue to report on the event, and were able to provide commentary from small booths constructed at the back of the venue. The contest was reportedly broadcast in 30 countries, with an estimated audience of 500 million viewers. Known details on the broadcasts in each country, including the specific broadcasting stations and commentators are shown in the tables below.

Broadcasters and commentators in participating countries
Country	Broadcaster	Channel(s)	Commentator(s)	Ref.
Austria	ORF	FS2	Ernst Grissemann	
Belgium	RTBF	RTBF1, Télé 2	Jacques Mercier	
Belgium	BRT	TV1	Luc Appermont	
Belgium	BRT	BRT 2		
Cyprus	CyBC	RIK, A Programma		
Denmark	DR	DR TV	Jørgen de Mylius	
Finland	YLE	TV1	Heikki Seppälä	
Finland	YLE	Rinnakkaisohjelma	Jaakko Salonoja	
France	Antenne 2		Léon Zitrone	
France	RFO	RFO-Martinique (Note: Delayed broadcast on 20 June 1984 at 20:02 (AST))		
Germany	ARD	Deutsches Fernsehen	Ado Schlier	
Ireland	RTÉ	RTÉ 1	Gay Byrne	
Ireland	RTÉ	RTÉ Radio 1	Larry Gogan	
Italy	RAI	Rai Due, (Note: Deferred broadcast at 22:10 (CEST)) RaiStereoUno	Antonio De Robertis	
Luxembourg	CLT	RTL Télévision	Valérie Sarn	
Luxembourg	CLT	RTL plus		
Netherlands	NOS	Nederland 1	Ivo Niehe	
Norway	NRK	NRK Fjernsynet	Roald Øyen	
Norway	NRK	NRK P1 (Note: Deferred broadcast at 22:50 (CEST))	Erik Heyerdahl	
Portugal	RTP	RTP1		
Portugal	RDP	Antena 1		
Spain	TVE	TVE 2	José-Miguel Ullán	
Sweden	SVT	TV1	Fredrik Belfrage	
Switzerland	SRG SSR	TV DRS	Bernard Thurnheer	
Switzerland	SRG SSR	TSR (Note: Broadcast through a second audio programme on TV DRS)	Serge Moisson	
Switzerland	SRG SSR	TSI		
Turkey	TRT	TRT Televizyon	Başak Doğru	
United Kingdom	BBC	BBC1	Terry Wogan	
United Kingdom	BFBS	BFBS Radio	Richard Nankivell	
Yugoslavia	JRT	TV Beograd 1, TV Novi Sad, TV Prishtina, TV Titograd 1, TV Zagreb 1	Oliver Mlakar	
Yugoslavia	JRT	TV Koper-Capodistria		
Yugoslavia	JRT	TV Ljubljana 1		
Yugoslavia	JRT	TV Skopje 1		

Broadcasters and commentators in non-participating countries
Country	Broadcaster	Channel(s)	Commentator(s)	Ref.
Australia	SBS	Network 0–28 (Note: Deferred broadcast the following day at 20:30 (AEST))		
Czechoslovakia	ČST	II. program (Note: Delayed broadcast on 3 June 1984 at 14:55 (CEST))		
Faroe Islands	SvF (Note: Delayed broadcast on 11 May 1984 at 20:00 (WET))			
Greenland	KNR	KNR (Note: Delayed broadcast on 19 May 1984 at 20:45 (WGST))		
Iceland	RÚV	Sjónvarpið	No commentator	
Jordan	JTV	JTV2		
Netherlands Antilles	ATM	TeleCuraçao (Note: Delayed broadcast on 7 July 1984 at 21:30 (ADT))		
Poland	TP	TP1 (Note: Delayed broadcast on 26 May 1984 at 20:00 (CEST))		

== Notes and references ==
=== Bibliography ===
- Murtomäki, Asko (2007). Finland 12 points! Suomen Euroviisut (in Finnish). Helsinki, Finland: Teos. ISBN 951-851-106-3.
- O'Connor, John Kennedy (2010). The Eurovision Song Contest: The Official History (2nd ed.). London, United Kingdom: Carlton Books. ISBN 978-1-84732-521-1.
- Roxburgh, Gordon (2014). Songs for Europe: The United Kingdom at the Eurovision Song Contest. Vol. Two: The 1970s. Prestatyn, United Kingdom: Telos Publishing. ISBN 978-1-84583-093-9.
- Roxburgh, Gordon (2016). Songs for Europe: The United Kingdom at the Eurovision Song Contest. Vol. Three: The 1980s. Prestatyn, United Kingdom: Telos Publishing. ISBN 978-1-84583-163-9.
- Thorsson, Leif; Verhage, Martin (2006). Melodifestivalen genom tiderna : de svenska uttagningarna och internationella finalerna [Melodifestivalen through the ages: the Swedish selections and international finals] (in Swedish). Stockholm, Sweden: Premium Publishing. ISBN 91-89136-29-2.
