= Spain in the Eurovision Song Contest 1984 =

- Eurovision Song Contest 1984
- Participating broadcaster: Televisión Española (TVE)
- Country: Spain
- Selection process: Internal selection
- Announcement date: Artist: 14 March 1984; Song: 3 April 1984

Competing entry
- Song: "Lady, Lady"
- Artist: Bravo
- Songwriters: Miguel Blasco Larami; Amaya Saizar

Placement
- Final result: 3rd, 106 points

Participation chronology

Spain was represented at the Eurovision Song Contest 1984 with the song "Lady, Lady", composed by Miguel Blasco Larami, with lyrics by Amaya Saizar, and performed by the group Bravo. The Spanish participating broadcaster, Televisión Española (TVE), internally selected its entry for the contest. The song, performed in position 4, placed third out of nineteen competing entries with 106 points.

== Before Eurovision ==
Televisión Española (TVE) internally selected "Lady, Lady" performed by the group Bravo as its entry for the Eurovision Song Contest 1984. The song was composed by Miguel Blasco Larami, and had lyrics by Amaya Saizar. The members of the group were Amaya Saizar herself, Yolanda Hoyos, Luis Villar, and Esteban Santos. The broadcaster announced the name of the song, the songwriters, and performers on 14 March 1984. On 3 April, TVE presented the song along the promo video that was distributed to the other participant broadcasters.

== At Eurovision ==
On 5 May 1984, the Eurovision Song Contest was held at the Théâtre Municipal in Luxembourg hosted by Radio Télévision Luxembourg (RTL), and broadcast live throughout the continent. Bravo performed "Lady, Lady" 4th on the evening, following France and preceding Norway. Eddy Guerin conducted the event's orchestra performance of the Spanish entry. At the close of the voting "Lady, Lady" had received 106 points, placing 3rd in a field of 19.

TVE broadcast the contest in Spain on TVE 2 with commentary by José-Miguel Ullán. Before the event, TVE aired a talk show hosted by Marisa Medina introducing the Spanish jury, which continued after the contest commenting on the results.

=== Voting ===
TVE assembled a jury panel with eleven members. The following members comprised the Spanish jury:

- Francisco Guardón Mora – laboratory employee
- Carmen González Cabeza – translator
- Rafael Rullán – basketball player
- Mayte Sancho Lucas – actress
- Victoriano Valencia – bullfighter
- Andrés Magdaleno – theater entrepreneur
- Eva Nasarre – ballet and gymnastics teacher
- Luis del Val – writer
- Carmen Garrido García – Chief of Protocol of the Presidency of the Community of Madrid
- Luis Fernando Abad Castro – industrial chemist
- Conchita Minguez Tudela – jockey

The jury was chaired by Pedro Macía, with Francisco Hortelano as secretary. Francisco Javier Alfaro was the notary public. These did not have the right to vote, but the president decided in the event of a tie. The jury awarded its maximum of 12 points to Italy.

Points awarded to Spain
Score	Country
12 points	Portugal; Turkey
10 points	France; Sweden
8 points	Italy; Luxembourg
7 points	Denmark; Ireland
6 points	Austria; Cyprus; Norway
5 points	
4 points	United Kingdom
3 points	Belgium; Switzerland
2 points	Netherlands; Yugoslavia
1 point	

Points awarded by Spain
Score	Country
12 points	Italy
10 points	Ireland
8 points	Netherlands
7 points	Luxembourg
6 points	Denmark
5 points	Portugal
4 points	Sweden
3 points	United Kingdom
2 points	Belgium
1 point	Finland
