= France in the Eurovision Song Contest 1984 =

- Eurovision Song Contest 1984
- Participating broadcaster: Antenne 2
- Country: France
- Selection process: National final
- Selection date: 25 March 1984

Competing entry
- Song: "Autant d'amoureux que d'étoiles"
- Artist: Annick Thoumazeau
- Songwriters: Vladimir Cosma; Charles Level

Placement
- Final result: 8th, 61 points

Participation chronology

France was represented at the Eurovision Song Contest 1984 with the song "Autant d'amoureux que d'étoiles", composed by Vladimir Cosma, with lyrics by Charles Level, and performed by Annick Thoumazeau. The French participating broadcaster, Antenne 2, selected its entry through a national final.

== Before Eurovision ==
=== National final ===
Antenne 2 held the national final on 25 March, hosted by Jean-Pierre Foucault and Catherine Ceylac. Fourteen songs took part with the winner chosen by a panel of television viewers who were telephoned and asked to vote on the songs.

R/O	Artist	Song	Points	Place
1	Victoire	"On n'est pas rock, on n'est pas jazz"	66	6
2	Muriel Laude	"Comme un automate"	16	13
3	Christine Carrasco	"Le temps de la musique"	179	2
4	Pierre Azama	"Les années claires"	48	8
5	Jean-Claude Allora	"Le cœur dans les nuages"	61	7
6	Émilien	"Et je l'aimais"	144	3
7	Euréka	"Fais-le, prends le temps de vivre"	24	12
8	Elia	"Eh musicien"	29	10
9	Evelyne Sélès	"Quand la terre était un jardin"	45	9
10	J.C.B.	"Parler d'amour"	16	13
11	Arc-en-Ciel	"Ton étoile"	121	5
12	Marise Bonnet	"Y-a-t-il un rêve"	26	11
13	Annick Thoumazeau	"Autant d'amoureux que d'étoiles"	206	1
14	Laurence Saltiel	"Le retour des bergers"	132	4

== At Eurovision ==
On the night of the final Thoumazeau performed third in the running order, following Luxembourg and preceding Spain. At the close of voting "Autant d'amoureux que d'étoiles" had received 61 points, placing France 8th of the 19 entries. The French jury awarded its 12 points to Belgium.

=== Voting ===
Points awarded to France
Score	Country
12 points	Netherlands
10 points	Belgium
8 points	Austria
7 points	Italy; Portugal
6 points	United Kingdom
5 points	
4 points	Switzerland
3 points	Cyprus
2 points	Norway; Sweden
1 point	

Points awarded by France
Score	Country
12 points	Belgium
10 points	Spain
8 points	Denmark
7 points	Netherlands
6 points	Sweden
5 points	Finland
4 points	Germany
3 points	Ireland
2 points	Yugoslavia
1 point	Cyprus
