= Finland in the Eurovision Song Contest 1984 =

- Eurovision Song Contest 1984
- Participating broadcaster: Yleisradio (Yle)
- Country: Finland
- Selection process: National final
- Selection date: 18 February 1984

Competing entry
- Song: "Hengaillaan"
- Artist: Kirka
- Songwriters: Jukka Siikavire; Jussi Tuominen

Placement
- Final result: 9th, 46 points

Participation chronology

Finland was represented at the Eurovision Song Contest 1984 with the song "Hengaillaan", composed by Jukka Siikavire, with lyrics by Jussi Tuominen, and performed by Kirka. The Finnish participating broadcaster, Yleisradio (Yle), selected its entry through a national final. Kirka won the Finnish Eurovision ticket at his eighth attempt.

== Before Eurovision ==
21 entries were selected for the competition from 286 received submissions. The composers got to choose between Anneli Saaristo, Kirka, Leena Nilsson, Paula Koivuniemi, Sonja Lumme, and Tomas Ek to perform their songs.

=== Radio semi-final ===
All of the 21 songs were broadcast on the radio on 22 January 1984. An expert jury chose eleven songs to the final. The finalists were announced the next day.

Radio semi-final – 22 January 1984
R/O	Artist	Song	Songwriter(s)	Result
1	Kirka	"Hymy"	Pertti Haverinen; Anu Luukka	—N/a
2	Sonja Lumme	"Aidat kaatuu"	Jaakko Keskinen; Jukka Heino	—N/a
3	Paula Koivuniemi	"Etsin juuriain"	Toivo Kärki; Vexi Salmi	—N/a
4	Kirka	"Laulu maailmalle"	Pave Maijanen	Qualified
5	Tomas Ek	"Macho man"	Nono Söderberg; Tomas Ek	Qualified
6	Anneli Saaristo	"Elän hetkessä"	Sirkka-Liisa Sass	—N/a
7	Kirka	"Oo Marie"	Esko M. Toivonen; Ilkka Vesterinen	Qualified
8	Leena Nilsson	"Sun silmät on satava salaisuus"	Jukka Nurmela	Qualified
9	Paula Koivuniemi	"Pienen hymy"	Olli Ahvenlahti; Juha Vainio	—N/a
10	Kirka	"Nuoruus"	Jokke Seppälä; Hector	—N/a
11	Sonja Lumme	"Laulajan tie"	László Varga; Jukka Nurmela	Qualified
12	Tomas Ek	"Barnet"	Barbara Helsingius; Ilkka Kortesniemi	—N/a
13	Kirka	"Taivas ja maa"	Roni Kamras; Kaisu Liuhala	—N/a
14	Anneli Saaristo	"Sä liian paljon vaadit"	Eero Tiikasalo; Anneli Nygren; Anneli Saaristo	Qualified
15	Paula Koivuniemi	"Tuultako tavoitan"	Eeva Kiviharju	Qualified
16	Kirka	"Hengaillaan"	Jukka Siikavire; Jussi Tuominen	Qualified
17	Sonja Lumme	"Sut vain"	Sauli Sunel Huhtala; Åke Sved	Qualified
18	Leena Nilsson and Tomas Ek	"Sol och vår" (Note: The song was translated in Finnish for the final ("Kevään saan"))	Hannu Koivula; Pasi Hiihtola	Qualified
19	Kirka	"Päällä maan, alla taivaan"	Kisu Jernström; Kassu Halonen; Edu Kettunen	—N/a
20	Paula Koivuniemi	"Via Dolorosa"	Mika Sundqvist	—N/a
21	Sonja Lumme	"Muistojen taulut"	Lasse Mirsch; Outi Mirsch	Qualified

=== National final ===
Yleisradio (Yle) held the national final on 18 February 1984 at its television studios in Helsinki, hosted by Maria Valkama. The winner was chosen by postcard voting. The voting ended on 21 February 1984, and the results were announced on 9 March 1984.

Final – 18 February 1984
R/O	Artist	Song	Votes	Place
1	Sonja Lumme	"Sut vain"	5,136	5
2	Kirka	"Laulu maailmalle"	3,640	7
3	Tomas Ek	"Macho man"	1,976	9
4	Leena Nilsson	"Sun silmät on satava salaisuus"	1,556	10
5	Kirka	"Oo Marie"	5,291	4
6	Anneli Saaristo	"Sä liian paljon vaadit"	10,961	3
7	Sonja Lumme	"Muistojen taulut"	3,970	6
8	Leena Nilsson and Tomas Ek	"Kevään saan"	2,823	8
9	Kirka	"Hengaillaan"	22,040	1
10	Paula Koivuniemi	"Tuultako tavoitan"	11,793	2
11	Sonja Lumme	"Laulajan tie"	863	11

== At Eurovision ==
On the night of the final Kirka performed 16th in the running order, following Turkey and preceding Switzerland. Kirka was accompanied by Kaija Kokkola, Anita Pajunen and Jokke Seppälä as backing vocalists. The costumes were designed by Arja Lehtimäki. At the close of voting "Hengaillaan" had received 46 points, placing Finland 9th of the 19 entries, the country's highest finish since 1975. The Finnish jury awarded its 12 points to Italy.

=== Voting ===
Points awarded to Finland
Score	Country
12 points	
10 points	
8 points	
7 points	Sweden
6 points	Denmark; Turkey
5 points	Austria; France; Norway
4 points	Cyprus
3 points	Portugal; Yugoslavia
2 points	
1 point	Germany; Spain

Points awarded by Finland
Score	Country
12 points	Italy
10 points	Belgium
8 points	Sweden
7 points	Ireland
6 points	Norway
5 points	Denmark
4 points	United Kingdom
3 points	Turkey
2 points	Yugoslavia
1 point	Switzerland
