= Curt-Eric Holmquist =

Swedish conductor (1948–2021)

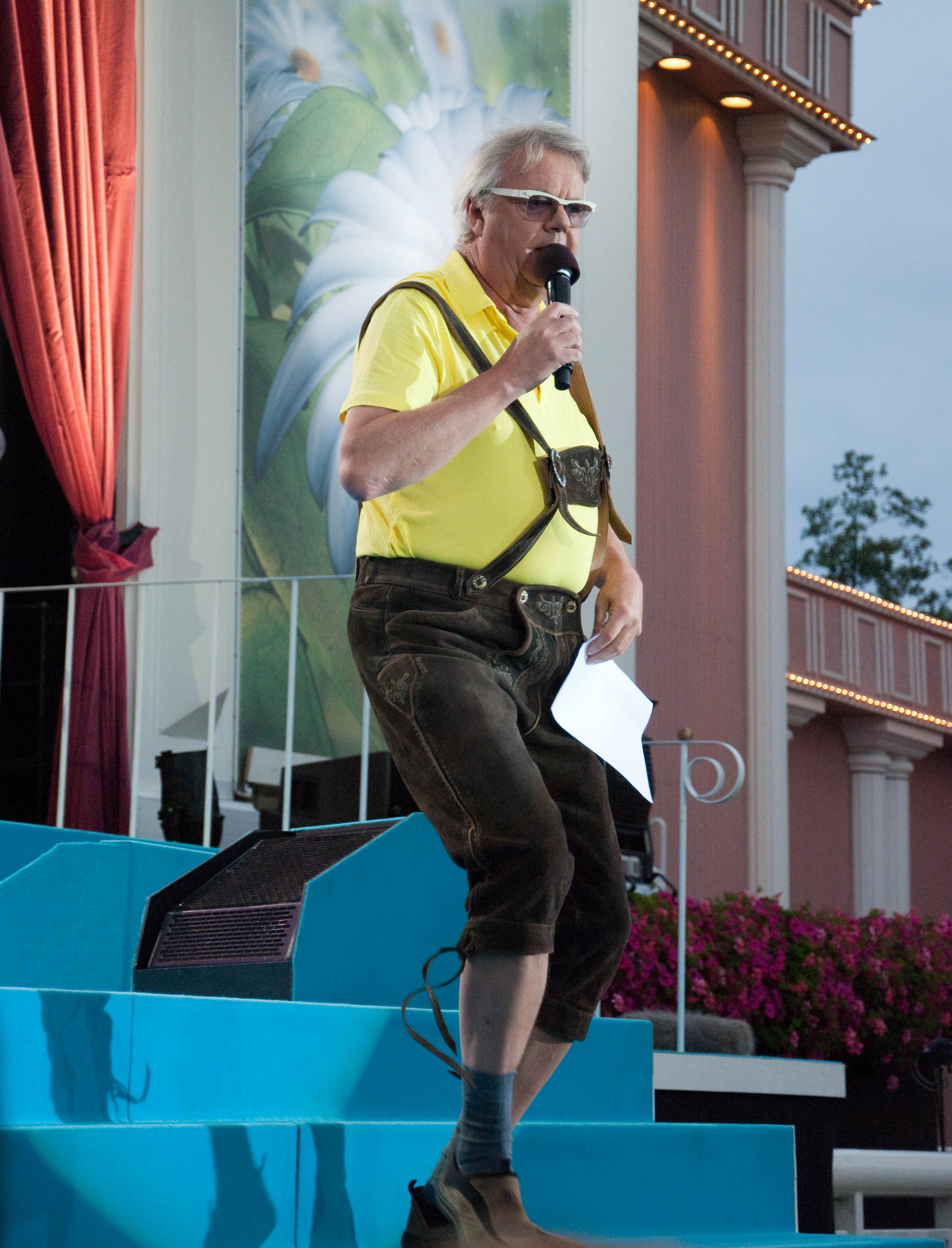
- Holmquist performing in July 2010
- Born: Curt-Eric Gunnar Holmquist; 20 June 1948; Gothenburg, Sweden
- Died: 20 July 2021 (aged 73)
- Occupations: Conductor; director
- Years active: 1964–2021
- Musical career
- Genres: Dansband
- Instrument: Organ

Curt-Eric Gunnar Holmquist (20 June 1948 – 20 July 2021) was a Swedish conductor.

Holmquist first helped the Swedish dance band Curt Haagers in 1966. He played the organ in the band until he left in 1969. He conducted the Swedish entry, "Diggi-Loo Diggi-Ley", in the 1984 Eurovision Song Contest and performed by the Herreys it won the contest. Holmquist conducted the Swedish entries for the Eurovision Song Contest on six occasions: 1984, 1985, 1987, 1990, 1993 and 1997. In addition to conducting the Swedish entries he also conducted the Belgian entry in 1985.

Holmquist was program director at Liseberg. He was also conductor at Lotta Engberg's sing-along shows (Lotta på Liseberg) at Liseberg.

Holmquist died on 20 July 2021 from leukemia, at the age of 73.

Preceded by (Luxembourg) Pierre Cao	Eurovision Song Contest conductor 1985	Succeeded by (Norway) Egil Monn-Iversen
