= Sophie Carle =

French actress and singer

- Born: 7 June 1964 (age 62); Luxembourg City
- Origin: Luxembourg
- Occupations: Actress; Singer

Sophie Carle (born 7 June 1964) is a Luxembourgish actress and singer mostly operating in France. She has appeared in several films, and represented Luxembourg in the Eurovision Song Contest 1984 with the song "100% d'amour". She was only the fourth native Luxembourger to represent the country, after Camillo Felgen (1960 and 1962), Chris Baldo (1968) and Monique Melsen (1971).

== Filmography ==
- Plus beau que moi tu meurs (1982)
- Souvenirs souvenirs (1984), as Muriel
- À nous les garçons (1984), as Véronique
- Requiem pour un fumeur (1985)
- Bing (1986, TV)
- L'Or noir de Lornac (1987, TV series), as Odette
- Napoleon and Josephine: A Love Story (1987, TV miniseries), as Claudine
- Diventerò padre (1988, TV)
- Quicker Than the Eye (1989), as Silke
- Câlins d'abord (1989, TV series), as Malou
- Le Gorille (1990, TV series, 1 episode), as Mlle Bondon
- Triplex (1991), as Brigitte
- Les Années campagne (1992), as Evelyne
- Un commissario a Roma (1993, TV series)
- Placé en garde à vue (1994, TV series)
- Coup de vice (1996), as Natacha
- Peur blanche (1998, TV), as Nicole
- Cavalcade (2005)

== Discography ==
- "100% d'amour" (1984)

== External links and sources ==
- Sophie Carle at IMDb
- A.Bernardini, Nino Manfredi "Un commissario a Roma" page 222

Preceded by Corinne Hermès with "Si la vie est cadeau"	Luxembourg in the Eurovision Song Contest; 1984	Succeeded by Margo, Franck Olivier, Diane Solomon, Ireen Sheer, Chris & Malcolm Roberts with "Children, Kinder, Enfants"
