= Göran Folkestad =

- Born: 1952; Finspång, Sweden
- Genres: Schlager
- Occupation(s): Songwriter, Singer, professor

Göran Folkestad (born 1952) is a Swedish songwriter and singer. He is professor of music pedagogy at Malmö Academy of Music. He has competed three times in Melodifestivalen during the 1980s, with the songs:

- 1984: "Sankta Cecilia" 2nd (duet with Lotta Engberg, under the surname of Pedersen.
- 1985: "Eld och lågor" 3rd
- 1987: "Sommarnatt", unplaced (The song was sung by Robert Wells)

== Discography ==
=== Albums ===
Title	Year of release
Du har tänt en eld i mig	1984
Eld och lågor	1985

=== Singles ===
Title	Year of release
Sankta Cecilia/Du	1984 (A-side together with Lotta Pedersen)
