= The Lollipops =

Danish pop and rock band formed in 1960

- Origin: Copenhagen, Denmark
- Genres: Pop rock; Beat; Garage rock; Dansktop genre
- Years active: 1960–1971, 1973–1988, 1989, 2003
- Labels: Karusell Records; Polydor; CBS; EMI; Philips
- Past members: Torben Lundgren; Jørgen Lundgren; Poul Petersen; Henrik Lund; Stig Kreutzfeldt; Kim Gutman; Søren Berlev; Chris Paulsen; Birdie Hurns
- Website: Archived website

The Lollipops were a Danish pop and rock group formed in Copenhagen in 1960 by brothers Torben and Jørgen Lundgren alongside their uncle Poul Petersen.

== History ==
=== Formation and early success (1960–1964) ===
The group was formed in 1960 in Copenhagen by brothers Torben Lundgren (lead vocals, rhythm guitar; born 21 January 1950) and Jørgen Lundgren (lead vocals, lead guitar; born 15 April 1951), together with their uncle Poul Petersen (drums; born 30 October 1948). At the time of formation, the members were aged ten, nine, and twelve. Before choosing the name The Lollipops, they performed briefly under the Danish names Trekløveret and Slikkepindene.

After winning a children's talent competition held by the Pingklubben organization, the trio began performing regularly at the Københavnerkroen venue in Copenhagen. Between 1961 and 1962, they toured Swedish folkparks and performed at United States military bases in Western Europe, where they shared bills with Louis Armstrong and Ray Charles.

In 1963, the band signed with the Swedish record label Karusell Records. Their debut single, "Lollipop Lips" / "Movin' the Shoes", was released in October 1963 and became a hit in Sweden. Their follow-up single "Do You Know (How Much I Love You)" reached number 7 on Sweden's Tio i topp chart in 1964. A Swedish fan club was established and grew to over 25,000 members, and the group appeared on the Swedish television program Hylands hörna.

=== Pioneer album and garage rock era (1965–1971) ===
In mid-1965, Karusell released the group's debut studio album, Do You Know... The Lollipops. It was the first Danish beat rock album to feature mostly original songs written by the band members. Between 1965 and 1967, the band also published an official fan club magazine, Lolli-Posten.

In September 1966, original drummer Poul Petersen left the group and was replaced by Henrik Lund, formerly of Stoke Sect; around 1967, bassist Stig Kreutzfeldt also joined the lineup. The band signed with Polydor Records in 1966. Their 1966 single "Naked When You Come" became a major hit across Scandinavia (reaching number 10 on Sweden's Kvällstoppen chart), and was accompanied by a promotional film that was banned from broadcast at the time.

In 1967, the group released the single "Sussy Moore", which peaked at number 12 on Kvällstoppen. The track drew melodic and lyrical inspiration from Tim Hardin's "The Lady Came from Baltimore".

By 1971, following declining commercial popularity, the group disbanded as its members focused on their education: Torben attended business school, Jørgen attended the Royal Danish Academy of Fine Arts, and Henrik Lund trained as a decorator.

=== Dansktop era, 1974 self-titled album, and Grand Prix (1973–1988) ===
In March 1973, The Lollipops reformed to perform in the Cirkusrevyen summer revue. Throughout the 1970s, the band released Danish-language songs in the dansktop style, including "Lorna", "Ung Kærlighed", and "Jenny".

In 1974, the group released a self-titled studio album through EMI. A song from this album, "I Know", later became the subject of an online search within the lostwave music community before being identified in 2026. Henrik Lund left the group in 1977, after which the Lundgren brothers performed with temporary musicians.

During the 1980s, the band entered Dansk Melodi Grand Prix, the national selection for the Eurovision Song Contest, on three occasions: in 1980 ("Nu er det morgen", finishing fifth), 1984 ("60'erne", finishing fifth), and 1987 ("Helt normal"). Outside of music, Torben operated clothing stores in Valby, while Jørgen worked as a visual artist and gallery owner.

=== Later years and disbandment (1989–2017) ===
In 1989, the Lundgren brothers attempted a comeback as The New Lollipops with guitarist Kim Gutman, drummer Søren Berlev (formerly of Gasolin'), bassist Chris Paulsen, and guitarist Birdie Hurns. The group released one English-language album, Suzanna, before disbanding.

Original drummer Poul Petersen died around 2002. The Lundgren brothers played their farewell show at Tivoli Gardens on 17 September 2003. On 13 March 2004, Jørgen Lundgren died from kidney disease at the age of 52. Following his brother's death, Torben Lundgren retired from business in Denmark and relocated to Hungary.

In August 2016, Torben Lundgren and Henrik Lund reunited for two concerts in Denmark (at Korsør Kulturhus and in Nysted), joined on backing vocals by Torben's daughter Louise Lundgren. On 25 March 2017, they performed another 1960s reunion concert in Trelleborg, Sweden.

== Members ==
=== Main members ===
- Torben Lundgren – lead vocals, rhythm guitar (1960–1971, 1973–1988, 1989, 2003)
- Jørgen Lundgren – lead vocals, lead guitar (1960–1971, 1973–1988, 1989, 2003; died 2004)
- Poul Petersen – drums (1960–1966; died c. 2002)
- Henrik Lund – drums (1966–1971, 1973–1977, 2016–2017)

=== Former touring and comeback members ===
- Stig Kreutzfeldt – bass (1967–1971)
- Kim Gutman – lead guitar (1989)
- Søren Berlev – drums (1989)
- Chris Paulsen – bass (1989)
- Birdie Hurns – guitar (1989)

== Discography ==
=== Studio albums ===
Year	Release Details	Tracklist	Personnel & Label Credits
1965	Do You Know... The Lollipops: Label: Karusell Records; Cat. Code: KALP 1016; Format: LP, Album, Gatefold; Country: Sweden / Denmark	# "Oh, Girl, I Love Her So": 1. "It Took A Long Time"; 2. "Look Up At The Stars"; 3. "I've Got A Girl"; 4. "So Blue"; 5. "All I've Got To Say"; 6. "Two Chips And One Fish"; 7. "Are You Lonesome Just Like Me"; 8. "I Want Her Back"; 9. "The Boy With Freckles And Red Hair"; 10. "Lucky Guy"; 11. "Nobody"; 12. "Do You Know"	Torben Lundgren – lead vocals, rhythm guitar; Jørgen Lundgren – lead vocals, lead guitar; Poul Petersen – drums; All tracks written by Torben & Jørgen Lundgren; Photographers: Per Dalsgård, Staffan Andersson
1965	The Lollipops: Label: Karusell Records; Cat. Code: KP 3000; Format: LP, Album; Country: Sweden	1. "I'll Stay By Your Side"; 2. "Lollipops Boogie"; 3. "That's All"; 4. "There Was A Time"; 5. "All My Loving"; 6. "Shakin' All Over"; 7. "I See It Now"; 8. "Don't Matter What You Do"; 9. "Little Bad Boy"; 10. "Speedy Gonzales"; 11. "Look At This Boy"; 12. "Lollipops Shake"	Torben Lundgren – lead vocals, rhythm guitar; Jørgen Lundgren – lead vocals, lead guitar; Poul Petersen – drums; Cover Design: Lennart Saletti; Printing: Alifa-Tryck
1966	The Lollipops: Label: International Polydor Production; Cat. Code: 623 028; Format: LP, Album, Mono/Stereo; Country: Germany	1. "Another Girl"; 2. "I'm So Sad"; 3. "Little Cat Lost"; 4. "A Change Has Got To Come"; 5. "Put You On The Chart"; 6. "Run Run Run"; 7. "Summer"; 8. "Once Again"; 9. "Naked When You Come"; 10. "I'm A Flop"; 11. "I Need"; 12. "Fisherman"; 13. "You Don't Have To Go"; 14. "Rub Down"	Torben Lundgren – lead vocals, rhythm guitar; Jørgen Lundgren – lead vocals, lead guitar
1974	Lollipops: Label: EMI; Cat. Code: KCLP 14 (TC-KCLP 14 for Cassette); Format: LP, Album, Gatefold; Country: Denmark	1. "What A Day - What A Night"; 2. "Rich Man's Daughter"; 3. "Goodbye My Baby"; 4. "All I Have"; 5. "Walk Away"; 6. "Lorna"; 7. "Forever"; 8. "T. J. R."; 9. "Living In The World Of Sorrow"; 10. "I Know"; 11. "How Can I Live (Without You)"; 12. "Rock Around"	Torben Lundgren – lead vocals, guitar; Jørgen Lundgren – lead vocals, guitar; Henrik Lund – drums; Producers: Per Sørensen, Tommy Seebach; Cover Design: Knud Møller Nicolaisen; Liner Notes: Jørgen Mylius; Photographer: Mogens Frederiksen
1989	Suzanna (Released as The New Lollipops): Label: EMI; Cat. Code: 7936871 (Alternative: D-1528); Format: LP, CD, Album; Country: Denmark	1. "Suzanna"; 2. "Love Tonight"; 3. "You"; 4. "Hold Me"; 5. "Burning"; 6. "Always Young"; 7. "Friends"; 8. "Give Me (Love)"; 9. "Back On The Road"; 10. "Lost And Found"; 11. "Let Me Love You"; 12. "Lonely Nights"	Torben Lundgren – lead vocals, guitar; Jørgen Lundgren – lead vocals, guitar; Kim Gutman – lead guitar; Søren Berlev – drums; Chris Paulsen – bass; Birdie Hurns – guitar

=== Compilations ===
- Pop Før (1974, Philips)
- Lollipops Bedste (1976, Philips)
- Naked When You Come (1998, Polydor)
- The Complete Recordings 1963–67 (2001)
- Dansk Pigtråd Vol. 4: The Complete 1963 – 31.8.1966 (2003, Karusell)
- Dansk Pigtråd Vol. 5: The Complete 1.9.1966 – 1971 (2003, Universal)

=== Singles & EPs ===
Year	Title & Release Details	Tracks (Side A / Side B)	Country & Notes
1963	"Lollipop Lips" / "Movin' the Shoes": Label: Karusell; Cat. Code: KFF 533 / DP 1374	Side A: "Lollipop Lips"; Side B: "Movin' the Shoes"	Sweden / Denmark. Released in Japan (1964) via Polydor.
1963	"Lollipop Lips" (EP): Label: Karusell; Cat. Code: KSEP 3313	4-track Extended Play (Mono)	Sweden. First press on blue vinyl.
1963	"Lollipops Boogie" (EP): Label: Karusell; Cat. Code: KSEP 3322	4-track Extended Play (Mono)	Sweden. First press on blue vinyl.
1964	"Do You Know (How Much I Love You)" / "There Was a Time": Label: Karusell; Cat. Code: KFF 573	Scandinavia-wide release (Sweden, Denmark, Finland). Peaked at No. 7 on Sweden's Tio i topp.: Side A: "Do You Know (How Much I Love You)"; Side B: "There Was a Time"	Scandinavia-wide release (Sweden, Denmark, Finland).
1964	"Lollipops Shake" / "Look at This Boy": Label: Karusell; Cat. Code: KFF 581	Side A: "Lollipops Shake"; Side B: "Look at This Boy"	Denmark / Sweden / Finland.
1965	"Little Bad Boy" / "Don't Matter What You Do": Label: Karusell; Cat. Code: KFF 603	Side A: "Little Bad Boy"; Side B: "Don't Matter What You Do"	Denmark / Sweden.
1965	"I'll Stay By Your Side" / "That's All": Label: Karusell; Cat. Code: KFF 607	Side A: "I'll Stay By Your Side"; Side B: "That's All"	Denmark / Sweden.
1965	"Oh, Girl" / "Are You Lonesome Just Like Me": Label: Karusell; Cat. Code: KFF 630	Side A: "Oh, Girl"; Side B: "Are You Lonesome Just Like Me"	Sweden.
1965	"I See It Now" / "Oh Girl": Label: Karusell; Cat. Code: KFF 642	Side A: "I See It Now"; Side B: "Oh Girl"	Sweden.
1966	"Words Ain't Enough" / "Who Cares About Me": Label: Polydor / Vault; Cat. Code: NH 59711 / V-926	Side A: "Words Ain't Enough"; Side B: "Who Cares About Me"	Sweden / Finland / Germany. Released in the US via Vault Records.
1966	"Why Fly The Birds" (EP): Label: Polydor; Cat. Code: EPH 10831	4-track Extended Play	Denmark.
1966	"Naked When You Come" / "Little Cat Lost": Label: Polydor; Cat. Code: NH 59724	Major Scandinavian hit; peaked at No. 10 on Sweden's Kvällstoppen.: Side A: "Naked When You Come"; Side B: "Little Cat Lost"	Major Scandinavian hit.
1966	"Bildjournalen GoGo Skiva 66": Label: Bildjournalen; Cat. Code: SHOL 681	Split promo flexi-disc with The Lee Kings and The Namelosers	Sweden.
1967	"I Can't Live Without Your Lovin'" / "Swing and Sway": Label: Polydor; Cat. Code: NH 59739	Side A: "I Can't Live Without Your Lovin'"; Side B: "Swing and Sway"	Sweden.
1967	"Another Girl" / "You Don't Have to Go": Label: Polydor; Cat. Code: NH 59732	Side A: "Another Girl"; Side B: "You Don't Have to Go"	Sweden.
1967	"Lies" / "Stop (Before You Break My Heart)": Label: Polydor; Cat. Code: NH 59746	Side A: "Lies"; Side B: "Stop (Before You Break My Heart)"	Sweden.
1967	"Sussy Moore" / "Love Is a Game for Two": Label: Fontana; Cat. Code: TF 271 603	Side A: "Sussy Moore"; Side B: "Love Is a Game for Two"	Peaked at No. 12 on Sweden's Kvällstoppen. Subject of copyright dispute.
1968	"I Feel the Sun Up There" / "Love Me, Love Me": Label: CBS; Cat. Code: CBS 3292	Side A: "I Feel the Sun Up There"; Side B: "Love Me, Love Me"	First single on CBS.
1968	"Ha Ha Ha - Hee Hee Hee" / "Marry Her Tonight": Label: CBS; Cat. Code: CBS 3422	Side A: "Ha Ha Ha - Hee Hee Hee"; Side B: "Marry Her Tonight"	Denmark.
1968	"Sådan een som dig" / "Nu er det glemt": Label: CBS; Cat. Code: CBS 3554	First Danish-language single.: Side A: "Sådan een som dig"; Side B: "Nu er det glemt"	First Danish-language single attempt.
1968	"A Freight Train to Boston" / "Your Eyes Are Shining": Label: CBS; Cat. Code: CBS 3673	Side A: "A Freight Train to Boston"; Side B: "Your Eyes Are Shining"	Denmark / Sweden.
1969	"Good Times Baby" / "On My Way": Label: CBS; Cat. Code: CBS 4286	Side A: "Good Times Baby"; Side B: "On My Way"	Denmark / Netherlands.
1969	"Maxwell's Silver Hammer" / "Sussy Help Me": Label: CBS; Cat. Code: CBS 4581	Side A: "Maxwell's Silver Hammer"; Side B: "Sussy Help Me"	The Beatles cover single. Released in Denmark, Netherlands, Norway.
1970	"Goody Goody Gum Drops" / "Laila": Label: Philips; Cat. Code: PF 355 373	Side A: "Goody Goody Gum Drops"; Side B: "Laila"	Denmark.
1971	"Ra-ta-ta-ta" / "I'm a Workslave": Label: Philips; Cat. Code: 6019 035	Side A: "Ra-ta-ta-ta"; Side B: "I'm a Workslave"	Final single before the first breakup.
1973	"Walk Away" / "T.J.R.": Label: EMI; Cat. Code: EMI 9063	Side A: "Walk Away"; Side B: "T.J.R."	Comeback single.
1973	"Living in a World of Sorrow" / "How Can I Live (Without You)": Label: EMI; Cat. Code: X 9070	Side A: "Living in a World of Sorrow"; Side B: "How Can I Live (Without You)"	Denmark.
1974	"What a Day - What a Night" / "Lorna": Label: EMI / Emidisc; Cat. Code: X 9097 / 1C 006-37 268	Side A: "What a Day - What a Night"; Side B: "Lorna"	Denmark / Netherlands / Germany.
1974	"All I Have" / "Rock Around": Label: EMI; Cat. Code: X 9083	Side A: "All I Have"; Side B: "Rock Around"	Denmark.
1974	"Livet er lunefuldt" / "Da-Di-Dam": Label: EMI; Cat. Code: X 9087	Side A: "Livet er lunefuldt"; Side B: "Da-Di-Dam"	Denmark.
1975	"Lorna" / "Goodbye My Baby": Label: EMI; Cat. Code: 1C 006-37 268	Side A: "Lorna"; Side B: "Goodbye My Baby"	Denmark.
1975	"Lonely Love" / "Bella Mia": Label: EMI; Cat. Code: X 9111 / EMI 2548	Side A: "Lonely Love"; Side B: "Bella Mia"	Released in the UK as a promo/commercial single.
1975	"Ung kærlighed" / "Kristina": Label: EMI; Cat. Code: X 9112	Side A: "Ung kærlighed"; Side B: "Kristina"	Dansktop chart hit.
1975	"Jenny" / "Feelings": Label: EMI; Cat. Code: X 9120	Side A: "Jenny"; Side B: "Feelings"	Denmark.
1975	"Why" / "If You Leave Me": Label: EMI; Cat. Code: 6C 006-37272 / 37280	Side A: "Why"; Side B: "If You Leave Me"	Denmark.
1976	"Piger" / "Speedy Gonzales": Label: EMI; Cat. Code: 6C 006 37285	Side A: "Piger"; Side B: "Speedy Gonzales"	Denmark.
1976	"Tårerne der faldt" / "Trumpet - Dansen": Label: EMI; Cat. Code: 6C 006 39122	Side A: "Tårerne der faldt"; Side B: "Trumpet - Dansen"	Denmark.
1976	"Louisiana" / "I Believe": Label: EMI; Cat. Code: 6C 006 39142	Side A: "Louisiana"; Side B: "I Believe"	Denmark.
1976	"Love Is the Best Thing in Your Life" / "Saturday Rock": Label: EMI; Cat. Code: 6C 006-39121	Side A: "Love Is the Best Thing in Your Life"; Side B: "Saturday Rock"	Denmark.
1977	"Lady Godiva" / "I'm Crying": Label: EMI; Cat. Code: 6C 006-39222	Side A: "Lady Godiva"; Side B: "I'm Crying"	Denmark.
1979	"Go'e Gamle Sange" / "The Happy Days" (Promo): Label: Private Press; Cat. Code: None	Side A: "Go'e Gamle Sange"; Side B: "The Happy Days"	Denmark.
1980	"Nu er det morgen" / "Syng en sang om evig fred": Label: Starbox; Cat. Code: SX 1188	Side A: "Nu er det morgen"; Side B: "Syng en sang om evig fred"	Released under the name Lollipops-Lips for the Dansk Melodi Grand Prix.
1982	"Se på mit fjæs" / "Hjemad": Label: Sonet; Cat. Code: T-8529	Side A: "Se på mit fjæs"; Side B: "Hjemad"	Denmark.
1984	"60'erne" / "Rock Og Rul": Label: MSP; Cat. Code: MSP 070284	Side A: "60'erne"; Side B: "Rock Og Rul"	Dansk Melodi Grand Prix entry.
1989	"Suzanna" / "Love Tonight": Label: EMI; Cat. Code: 1397607	Side A: "Suzanna"; Side B: "Love Tonight"	Released as The New Lollipops. Final single.
