= Norway in the Eurovision Song Contest 1984 =

- Eurovision Song Contest 1984
- Participating broadcaster: Norsk rikskringkasting (NRK)
- Country: Norway
- Selection process: Melodi Grand Prix 1984
- Selection date: 7 April 1984

Competing entry
- Song: "Lenge leve livet"
- Artist: Dollie de Luxe
- Songwriters: Benedicte Adrian; Ingrid Bjørnov

Placement
- Final result: 17th, 29 points

Participation chronology

Norway was represented at the Eurovision Song Contest 1984 with the song "Lenge leve livet", written by Benedicte Adrian and Ingrid Bjørnov, and performed by themselves under their stage name Dollie de Luxe. The Norwegian participating broadcaster, Norsk rikskringkasting (NRK), selected its entry through the Melodi Grand Prix 1984.

== Before Eurovision ==
=== Melodi Grand Prix 1984 ===
Norsk rikskringkasting (NRK) held the Melodi Grand Prix 1984 on 7 April 1984 at the Château Neuf in Oslo, hosted by Sissel Keyn Lodding. Ten songs took part in the final, with the winner chosen by voting from five juries separated by age.

Final – 7 April 1984
R/O	Artist	Song	Points	Place
1	Beate Jacobsen	"Strand Hotel"	43	2
2	Ina Tangerud	"Dine øyne"	15	8
3	Ove Thue	"Lenge siden nå"	11	10
4	Inger Lise Rypdal	"Vindar"	42	3
5	Dollie de Luxe	"Lenge leve livet"	45	1
6	Ellen Nikolaysen	"Opus"	25	6
7	Hilde Heltberg	"Ditt smil"	17	7
8	Nick Borgen	"La musikken leve"	35	5
9	Cathy Ryen	"Jeanne d'Arc"	15	8
10	Silhouette	"A-oa-oa-oa"	42	3

Detailed Jury Votes
R/O	Song	Under 20	20-30	30-40	40-50	Over 50	Total
1	"Strand Hotel"	6	12	10	8	7	43
2	"Dine øyne"	4	2	3	3	3	15
3	"Lenge siden nå"	1	1	1	4	4	11
4	"Vindar"	10	10	12	5	5	42
5	"Lenge leve livet"	12	7	8	10	8	45
6	"Opus"	2	5	6	6	6	25
7	"Ditt smil"	8	3	2	2	2	17
8	"La musikken leve"	5	8	5	7	10	35
9	"Jeanne d'Arc"	3	6	4	1	1	15
10	"A-oa-oa-oa"	7	4	7	12	12	42

== At Eurovision ==
On the night of the final de Luxe performed 5th in the running order, following Spain and preceding the United Kingdom. At the close of voting "Lenge leve livet" had picked up 29 points (the highest an 8 from Sweden), placing Norway 17th of the 19 entries. The Norwegian jury awarded its 12 points to Denmark.

=== Voting ===
Points awarded to Norway
Score	Country
12 points	
10 points	
8 points	Sweden
7 points	Luxembourg
6 points	Finland
5 points	
4 points	
3 points	Ireland
2 points	Germany; Switzerland
1 point	Belgium

Points awarded by Norway
Score	Country
12 points	Denmark
10 points	Sweden
8 points	United Kingdom
7 points	Germany
6 points	Spain
5 points	Finland
4 points	Ireland
3 points	Belgium
2 points	France
1 point	Italy
