= Ireland in the Eurovision Song Contest 1984 =

- Eurovision Song Contest 1984
- Participating broadcaster: Radio Telefís Éireann (RTÉ)
- Country: Ireland
- Selection process: National final
- Selection date: 31 March 1984

Competing entry
- Song: "Terminal 3"
- Artist: Linda Martin
- Songwriter: Seán Sherrard

Placement
- Final result: 2nd, 137 points

Participation chronology

Ireland was represented at the Eurovision Song Contest 1984 with the song "Terminal 3", written by Seán Sherrard, and performed by Linda Martin. The Irish participating broadcaster, Radio Telefís Éireann (RTÉ), selected its entry through a national final.

"Terminal 3" marked Ireland's return to Eurovision following RTÉ's decision to opt out of the 1983 contest because of financial constraints.

== Before Eurovision ==
=== National final ===
Radio Telefís Éireann (RTÉ) held the national final on 31 March 1984 at its studios in Dublin, hosted by Gay Byrne. Eight songs took part, with the winner chosen by voting from eight regional juries. Contestants included 1981 Irish representatives Sheeba, and Charlie McGettigan, who would go on to win Eurovision ten years down the line.

R/O	Artist	Song	Points	Place
1	Girl Talk	"Problems"	0	6
2	Robert Strong	"The Show Is Over"	0	6
3	Flo McSweeney	"This Is for You"	16	2
4	Thomas McParland	"April Won't Be Here Till September"	3	5
5	Linda Martin	"Terminal 3"	18	1
6	Aileen Pringle	"Don't Take My Dream Away"	0	6
7	Charlie McGettigan	"Bee Bop Delight"	14	3
8	Sheeba	"My Love and You"	13	4

Detailed Regional Jury Votes
R/O	Song	Cork	Buncrana	Dublin	Athlone	Sligo	Wexford	Limerick	Monaghan	Total
1	"Problems"									0
2	"The Show Is Over"									0
3	"This Is for You"	1		3	1	2	2		7	16
4	"April Won't Be Here Till September"							3		3
5	"Terminal 3"	1	2	1		4	6	3	1	18
6	"Don't Take My Dream Away"									0
7	"Bee Bop Delight"		4	2	5	1		2		14
8	"My Love and You"	6	2	2	2	1				13

== At Eurovision ==
On the night of the final Martin performed 9th in the running order, following Belgium and preceding Denmark. At the end of the voting Ireland finished in second place with 137 points. The Irish jury awarded its 12 points to Sweden.

=== Voting ===
Points awarded to Ireland
Score	Country
12 points	Belgium; Italy; Sweden; Switzerland
10 points	Austria; Cyprus; Germany; Spain; Turkey
8 points	United Kingdom
7 points	Finland; Netherlands
6 points	
5 points	Luxembourg
4 points	Norway
3 points	Denmark; France
2 points	Portugal
1 point	

Points awarded by Ireland
Score	Country
12 points	Sweden
10 points	Denmark
8 points	United Kingdom
7 points	Spain
6 points	Netherlands
5 points	Luxembourg
4 points	Cyprus
3 points	Norway
2 points	Turkey
1 point	Austria
