= Maribelle =

Dutch singer

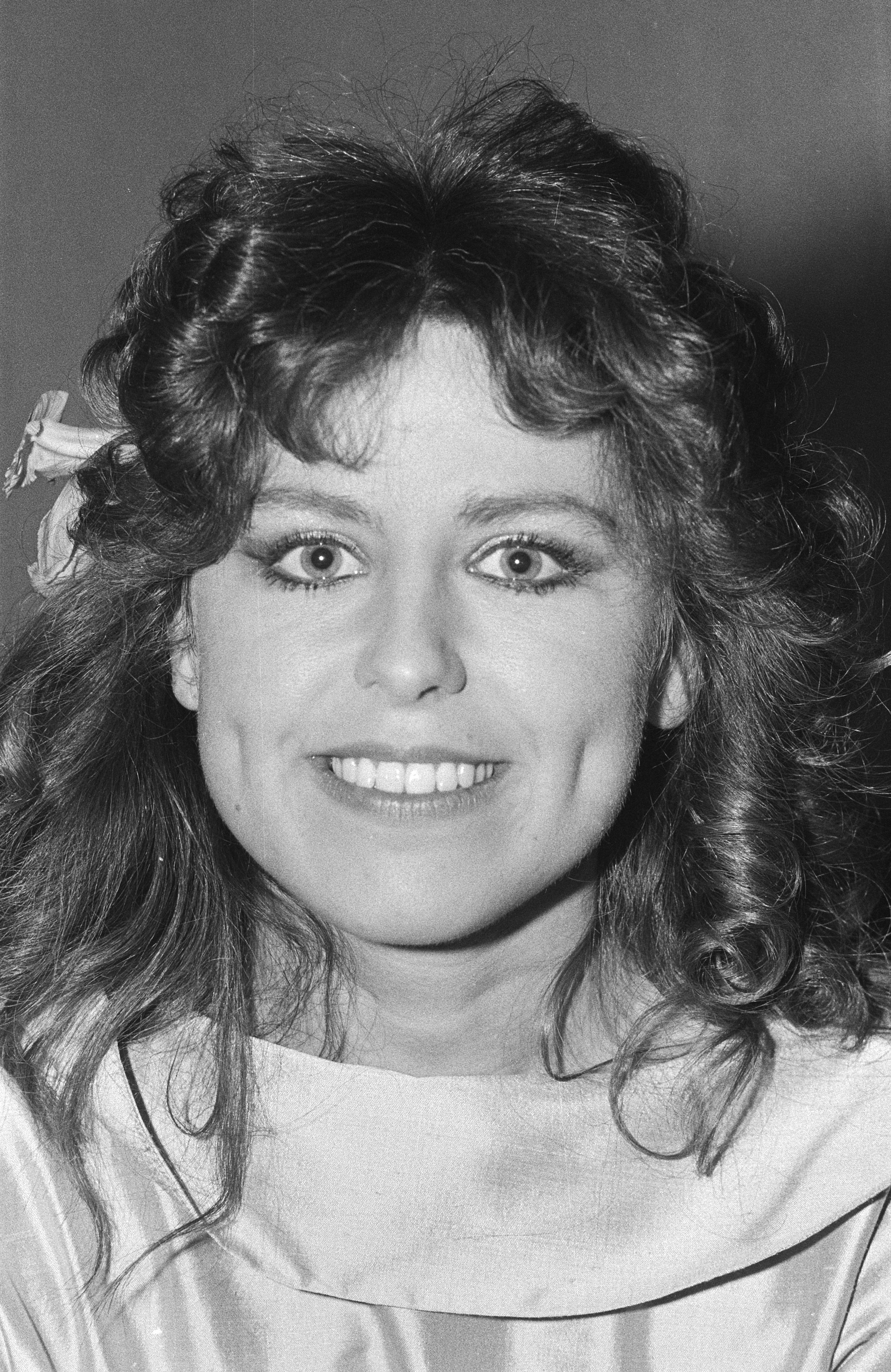
- Maribelle in 1984

Background information
- Born: Marie Kwakman; 4 April 1960 (age 66)
- Origin: Volendam, Netherlands
- Genres: Pop
- Occupation: Singer
- Website: Maribelle

Maribelle (born Marie Kwakman on 4 April 1960) is a Dutch singer. She represented the Netherlands in the Eurovision Song Contest 1984.

In 1981, Maribelle performed two songs, "Marionette" and "Fantasie", in the Dutch Eurovision pre-selection, only to finish second and third, behind Linda Williams. She had better luck in 1984, when her two songs finished first and second, with "Ik hou van jou" ("I Love You") edging out "Vanavond", and going forward as the Netherlands' representative to the Eurovision Song Contest 1984, held in Luxembourg City on 5 May. Prior to the contest, "Ik hou van jou" had been fancied to do well so its final placing of 13th out of the 19 entries was very disappointing. (Although Maribelle had given a confident performance, there was considerable criticism afterwards of the unflattering outfit in which she had appeared on stage.) Despite its poor Eurovision performance, "Ik hou van jou" has gone on to be an enduring and popular song in the Dutch language market, having been covered successfully by Gordon Heuckeroth, Dana Winner, Thomaz and Roxeanne Hazes.

Maribelle continues to record, and has placed several singles on the Dutch chart, most recently "Ik geef me over", a top 40 hit in October 2009.

Awards and achievements
Preceded by Bernadette with "Sing Me a Song"	Netherlands in the Eurovision Song Contest; 1984	Succeeded by Frizzle Sizzle with "Alles heeft ritme"
