= Netherlands in the Eurovision Song Contest 1984 =

- Eurovision Song Contest 1984
- Participating broadcaster: Nederlandse Omroep Stichting (NOS)
- Country: Netherlands
- Selection process: Nationaal Songfestival 1984
- Selection date: 14 March 1984

Competing entry
- Song: "Ik hou van jou"
- Artist: Maribelle
- Songwriters: Peter van Asten; Richard de Bois

Placement
- Final result: 13th, 34 points

Participation chronology

The Netherlands was represented at the Eurovision Song Contest 1984 with the song "Ik hou van jou", written by Peter van Asten and Richard de Bois, and performed by Maribelle. The Dutch participating broadcaster, Nederlandse Omroep Stichting (NOS), selected its entry through a national final. Maribelle had previously missed out narrowly in the 1981 national final.

== Before Eurovision ==
=== Nationaal Songfestival 1984 ===
Nederlandse Omroep Stichting (NOS) held the national final at its television studios in Hilversum, hosted by Eddy Becker. Five acts took part, performing two songs each. Voting was by 12 regional juries awarding points in Eurovision-style. "Ik hou van jou" emerged the winner by a 10-point margin over Maribelle's second song "Vanavond".

Final – 14 March 1984
R/O	Artist	Song	Points	Place
1	Brigitte	"Jeruzalem"	45	8
2	Edward Reekers	"Dief in de nacht"	61	6
3	Claudia Hoogendoorn	"Nooit vergeten"	20	10
4	Vulcano	"Dolce far niente"	97	4
5	Maribelle	"Vanavond"	103	2
6	Brigitte	"Later"	63	5
7	Edward Reekers	"Doe wat je voelt"	57	7
8	Claudia Hoogendoorn	"Dans"	41	9
9	Vulcano	"1, 2, 3"	102	3
10	Maribelle	"Ik hou van jou"	113	1

== At Eurovision ==
On the night of the final Maribelle performed 11th in the running order, following Denmark and preceding Yugoslavia. At the close of voting "Ik hou van jou" had received 34 points from seven countries, placing the Netherlands joint 13th (with Germany) of the 19 entries. The Dutch jury awarded its 12 points to France.

The Dutch conductor at the contest was Rogier van Otterloo.

=== Voting ===
Points awarded to the Netherlands
Score	Country
12 points	
10 points	
8 points	Spain
7 points	France
6 points	Ireland
5 points	Switzerland; Yugoslavia
4 points	
3 points	
2 points	Luxembourg
1 point	United Kingdom

Points awarded by the Netherlands
Score	Country
12 points	France
10 points	Sweden
8 points	Belgium
7 points	Ireland
6 points	Portugal
5 points	Germany
4 points	United Kingdom
3 points	Denmark
2 points	Spain
1 point	Turkey
