= Haki Misini =

Kosovo-Albanian singer

- Born: 1951; Kosovska Mitrovica, PR Serbia, FPR Yugoslavia (modern Kosovo)
- Died: 10 June 1999 (aged 47); Mitrovica, Kosovo
- Occupation: Singer
- Years active: 1973–1999

Haki Misini (1951 – 10 June 1999) was a Kosovo-Albanian singer. Born and raised in Mitrovica, Misini together with Mehmet Tupella, Rexhep Ismajli, Halil Bajraktari, Sedat Isufi and Xhevdet Gashi formed the rock band MAK. Haki Misini was murdered by the Serbian forces in the end of the Kosovo War.

== Life ==
Haki Misini was the vocalist of the group Mak with whom he made several hits like Moj e mira te pojata, Idila verore, Tri gota or Dashuria e humbur being one of the pioneers of the Albanian rock music. Haki Misini was part of the Jugovizija 1984, which was held on 23 March at the Universal Hall in Skopje, and was hosted by Blagoja Krstevski and Ljiljana Trajkovska. There he performed the song Fryti i dashurisë with Vera Oruqaj.

On 10 June 1999, Haki Misini was murdered by the Serbian police, only a few hours before the NATO bombing of Yugoslavia. In 2005, his body was found in the village Suhodoll.

== Discography ==
- "Moj e mira te Pojata
- "Dil në derë o moj vogëlushe
- "Tri gota
- "Dashuria e humbur
- "Tito
- "Leskovik po fryn një erë
