= José-Miguel Ullán =

Spanish journalist

- Born: October 30, 1944; Villarino de los Aires, Province of Salamanca, Spain
- Died: May 23, 2009 (aged 64); Madrid, Spain
- Occupation: Journalist

José-Miguel Ullán (October 30, 1944 – May 23, 2009) was a Spanish television journalist, writer and poet.

== Early life ==
Ullán was born in Villarino de los Aires, Salamanca. He studied liturite in Madrid. During the final decade of the Francoist Spain, Ullán fled to Paris and began working as a writer and journalist for the French broadcaster ORTF, there he worked with other writers including Pierre Vilar, Roland Barthes and Lucien Goldmann.

== Career ==
=== Journalism career ===
After the death of the Spanish caudillo Francisco Franco in 1975, Ullán returned to his native Spain and began working for the Spanish broadcaster Televisión Española and began broadcasting for various television programmes which included TVE commentary for the Eurovision Song Contest, twice in 1983 and 1984. In addition from 1985 Ullán was a regular host on Radio Nacional de España, in which he hosted the show Otra canción y Acércate más. In addition he was a regular writer for the newspapers Diario 16 and El País

=== Bibliophile career ===
Ullán wrote poems on several artists, they are displayed at Museum of Modern Art, Museo Nacional Centro de Arte Reina Sofía and Bibliothèque nationale de France.

=== Work with musicians ===
Ullán was a close friend of the singer Luis de Pablo, Pablo once invited Ullán to write articles on his music. Ullán wrote about several of his albums which included Pocket Zarzuela.

== Death ==
On May 23, 2009, whilst living in Madrid, Ullán unexpectedly died at the age of 64.
