= I treni di Tozeur =

1984 song by Alice and Franco Battiato

- The original 7 inch single sleeve (Italy)

Single by Alice & Battiato
- Language: Italian
- Released: 1984
- Composers: Franco Battiato; Giusto Pio
- Lyricists: Franco Battiato; Rosario Cosentino

Eurovision Song Contest 1984 entry
- Country: Italy
- Artists: Carla Bissi; Franco Battiato
- As: Alice & Battiato
- Language: Italian
- Composers: Franco Battiato; Giusto Pio
- Lyricists: Franco Battiato; Rosario Cosentino
- Conductor: Giusto Pio

Finals performance
- Final result: 5th
- Final points: 70

Entry chronology
- ◄ "Per Lucia" (1983)
- "Magic Oh Magic" (1985) ►

"I treni di Tozeur" ("The trains of Tozeur") is a song, written by Franco Battiato, Rosario "Saro" Cosentino, and Giusto Pio. It represented Italy in the Eurovision Song Contest 1984, performed in Italian (with some lyrics in German) by Alice and Battiato.

In a studio version sung only by Battiato, the song was later to be included on his album Mondi lontanissimi (1985) and was subsequently also recorded in English and Spanish language versions as "The Trains of Tozeur" and "Los trenes de Tozeur" and featured on the albums Echoes of Sufi Dances and Ecos de Danzas Sufi respectively. In 1994 Battiato recorded an interpretation of the song with a symphony orchestra for his live album Unprotected.

Alice also recorded solo versions of the song, included on albums Elisir (1987) and Personal Jukebox (1999), the latter featuring strings by the London Session Orchestra, arranged and conducted by Gavyn Wright. The original 1984 duet version of the song features on the 2005 career retrospective Studio Collection, in effect making its debut on an Alice album twenty-one years after its recording.

== Lyrics and historical background ==
The train line referred to in the lyrics runs from Metlaoui in the north through the Selja Gorges in the Atlas Mountains to Tozeur on the border of the Sahara desert in the south, the frontier mentioned is subsequently the Tunisian-Algerian. The track was built in the early 1900s at an enormous cost of both state finances and human lives in order for the Bey of Tunis (the King of Tunisia) to travel in grand style to his winter palace in the oasis town of Tozeur and largely also to impress foreign dignitaries on visit. There was originally only one train set, built in Paris in 1910 and this was an official gift from the state of France to the Bey of Tunisia when the country was a French protectorate. With all five carriages painted deep-red it was colloquially named the Lézard Rouge (Red Lizard) by the oppressed and empoverished Tunisian people and was seen as a symbol of both the beys's power and extravagant Western-influenced life-style and the French imperialism.

After the bankrupt Tunisia became an autonomous republic in 1957 and the then reigning Bey from the Husainid Dynasty had lost both his political influence and his substantial inherited personal wealth, the train set with its Belle Époque interiors of brocaded velvet armchairs, overhead antique-globed lighting, brass fittings, mahogany marquetry and panoramic windows was confiscated by the new government but due to its symbolical value stored in a depot and left to its destiny. After some thirty years in decay it was however restored by the Tunisian state and the SNCFT (Société Nationale de Chemins de Fer Tunisiens) and today the Red Lizard and the train line Metlaoui-Tozeur, often referred to as the North-African Orient Express, is again running and one of the country's tourist attractions.

== Composition ==
The German language part of "I treni di Tozeur" performed by three female opera singers, doch wir wollen dir ihn zeigen / und du wirst..., is a quote from Wolfgang Amadeus Mozart's opera or singspiel The Magic Flute (Die Zauberflöte), Act II Scene 7, in its original form only a mere second in duration, 3 bars long, in 6/8 time, usually sung by three young boys or genii. The full sentence goes: doch wir wollen dir ihn zeigen, und du wirst mit Staunen sehn, daß er dir sein Herz geweiht; translated: "still we want to show him to you, and you will with astonishment see that he consecrates his heart to you".

In 1981 Alice had won the Sanremo Music Festival with another Battiato composition, "Per Elisa", which in turn both musically and lyrically was a paraphrase of Ludwig van Beethoven's bagatelle in A minor WoO 59, popularly known as "Für Elise".

Despite its many atypicalities and for its genre comparatively complex structure, "I treni di Tozeur" appeared on the CD set of Winners and Classics produced to coincide with the Congratulations special of late 2005 as well as on the accompanying DVD.

== Eurovision performance ==
The three classically trained mezzo-sopranos – on the night of the contest in Luxembourg dressed in green, white and red evening gowns, the colours of the Italian flag (however, the audience saw the wrong order with the red on where green was supposed to be and vice versa) – stood silent for two minutes and thirty-five seconds until they performed their four bars from The Magic Flute; eight seconds in all.

The studio recording of the song features American opera singer Marilyn Horne performing all three harmonies and also the string section of the La Scala orchestra in Milan. The B-side of the single, the instrumental "Le biciclette di Forlì" ("The bicycles from Forlì"), is a reference to Alice's birthplace, the town of Forlì.

The song was performed eighteenth on the night, following Switzerland's Rainy Day with "Welche Farbe hat der Sonnenschein?" and preceding Portugal's Maria Guinot with "Silêncio e tanta gente". Before the contest, it was ranked by bookmakers Ladbrokes as the second favorite entry to win, behind Ireland's "Terminal 3", performed by Linda Martin. Despite receiving the coveted "twelve points" from countries as diverse as Spain and Finland, at the close of voting it had only totalled 70 points, placing it shared 5th in a field of 19.

== Summary ==
Despite not winning the actual contest "I treni di Tozeur" proved to be a commercial hit in continental Europe. The single turned out to be a Top 20 hit in Sweden, the country that won the contest with "Diggi-Loo Diggi-Ley" – and also one of the nine countries to award the Italian entry zero points in the contest. "I treni di Tozeur" is also one of the very few Italian Eurovision entries ever to become a commercial success in Italy itself: the song was a #1 hit in June 1984 and on the list of the best-selling singles in Italy of 1984 "I treni di Tozeur" placed as #20.

Alice and Battiato have continued to work together ever since. In 2002 the two recorded the duet "Come un sigillo" for his album Fleurs 3.

"I treni di Tozeur" was succeeded as Italian representative by Al Bano & Romina Power with "Magic Oh Magic".

== Cover versions ==
Finnish singer Seija Simola, who represented Finland in the Eurovision Song Contest 1978 with "Anna rakkaudelle tilaisuus", covered "I Treni di Tozeur" on her 1984 album Tunteet. The Finnish language version with lyrics by Simola herself is entitled "Juna Turkuun", which literally translates as "The train to Turku". This was the third Italian Eurovision entry Simola recorded, in 1970 she had covered Domenico Modugno's 1966 entry "Dio, come ti amo" in Italian and in 1977 Mia Martini's "Libera" in Finnish under the title "Vapaana".

== Appearances in other media ==
The original duet version of "I treni di Tozeur" with Alice and Franco Battiato features in Italian film director Nanni Moretti's award-winning 1985 comedy La messa è finita.

== Charts ==
Chart (1984)	Peak position
Belgium (Ultratop 50 Flanders)	30
Netherlands (Single Top 100)	15
Switzerland (Schweizer Hitparade)	18
Italy (FIMI)	3

== Sources ==
- Centro di Gravità permanente, Macale Maurizio, Bastogi Editrice Italiana.
- Tecnica mista sul tappeto, Franco Pulcini, EDT publications Italy.
- Franco Battiato. Pronipote dei padri del deserto., Luca Cozzari, Zona publications Italy.
- Evoluzione. Evoluzione. Evoluzione., Enrico Carbone, Bonanno publications Italy.
- Franco Battiato. Un sufi e la sua musica., Guido Guidi Guerrera, Editrice Loggia de' Lanzi.
- Fenomenologia di Battiato, Enzo Di Mauro and Roberto Masotti, Auditorium publications Italy.
