= Turkish women in music =

Turkish women in music may perform in one or more genres of music which are the Turkish folklore music, the Turkish classical music, popular music or Western classical music. Folklore music is the traditional music with Turkish lyrics (see türkü), and also Kurdish. Turkish classical music is actually the continuation of the Ottoman palace music which is also in Turkish. Turkish popular music is similar to western popular music (western melodies with Turkish or original lyrics, new compositions and arranged form of folklore music).

== Pop music ==
=== Singers ===
- Ajda Pekkan
- Aleyna Tilki
- Arzu Ece
- Aslı Güngör
- Aşkın Nur Yengi
- Aydilge Sarp (aka Aydilge)
- Ayla Algan
- Ayla Çelik
- Ayla Dikmen
- Aylin Livaneli
- Aynur Aydın
- Ayşe Hatun Önal
- Ayten Alpman
- Bülent Ersoy
- Behiye Aksoy
- Belkis Akkale
- Bengü Erden (aka Bengü)
- Beyza Durmaz
- Burcu Güneş
- Candan Erçetin
- Ceylan Ertem
- Demet Akalın
- Demet Sağıroğlu
- Deniz Atiye Yılmaz (aka Atiye)
- Deniz Çelik (aka Bendeniz)
- Deniz Kurtel
- Deniz Seki
- Derya Uluğ
- Ebru Gündeş
- Ebru Yaşar
- Ece Seçkin
- Emel Sayın
- Esin Afşar
- Esmeray Diriker (aka Esmeray)
- Funda Arar
- Füsun Önal
- Gökçe Dincer (aka Gökçe)
- Göksel Demirpençe (aka Göksel)
- Gönül Yazar
- Gülben Ergen
- Gülden Karaböcek
- Güliz Ayla
- Gülşen Bayraktar (aka Gülşen)
- Hadise Açıkgöz (aka Hadise)
- Hande Yener
- Hilal Cebeci
- Hülya Avşar
- Hümeyra Akbay (aka Hümeyra)
- Işıl German
- Işıl Yücesoy
- Işın Karaca
- İdil Biret
- İrem Derici
- İzel Çeliköz (aka İzel)
- Jehan Barbur
- Bahriye Tokmak (aka Kibariye)
- Leman Sam
- Leyla Gencer
- Linet Menaşi (aka Linet)
- Merve Özbey
- Muazzez Ersoy
- Nazan Öncel
- Nezihe Kalkan (aka Nez)
- Neşe Karaböcek
- Neşe Zara Yılmaz (aka Zara)
- Nil Burak
- Nil Karaibrahimgil
- Nilüfer Yumlu (aka Nilüfer)
- Nuray Hafiftaş
- Nükhet Duru
- Nükhet Ruacan
- Özlem Tekin
- Pamela Spence (aka Pamela)
- Perihan Benli (aka Romalı Perihan)
- Safiye Ayla
- Seda Sayan
- Seden Gürel
- Selda Bağcan
- Semiha Berksoy
- Semiha Yankı
- Sertab Erener
- Seyyal Taner
- Sezen Aksu
- Sıla Gençoğlu (aka Sıla)
- Sibel Can
- Sibel Egemen
- Sibel Tüzün
- Simge Sağın (aka Simge)
- Suna Kan
- Şebnem Ferah
- Şebnem Paker
- Şefika Kutluer
- Şenay Yüzbaşıoğlu (aka Şenay)
- Şevval Sam
- Tuğba Yurt
- Tülay German
- Tülay Keçialan (aka Asya)
- Yeşim Salkım
- Yıldız Kaplan
- Yıldız Tilbe
- Yonca Evcimik
- Zerrin Özer
- Zeynep Bastık
- Ziynet Sali
- Zuhal Olcay

=== Groups ===
- Balık Sisters (Didem and Sinem)
- Cici Kızlar
- Hepsi
- Manifest

== Turkish classical music ==
=== Composers ===
- Leyla Saz

=== Players ===
- Vecihe Daryal, qanun
- Fahire Fersan, classical kemençe

=== Singers ===
- Behiye Aksoy
- Bülent Ersoy
- Muazzez Abacı
- Muazzez Ersoy
- Müzeyyen Senar
- Nesrin Sipahi
- Safiye Ayla
- Sevim Tanürek

== Western classical music ==
=== Players ===
- Ani Kavafian, violin
- Anjelika Akbar, piano
- Ayşegül Sarıca, piano
- Ferhunde Erkin, piano
- Filiz Ali, piano
- Gülsin Onay, piano
- Ida Kavafian, violin
- İdil Biret, piano
- Önder Sisters, piano
- Pekinel sisters, piano
- Rüya Taner, piano
- Şahan Arzruni, piano
- Şefika Kutluer, flute
- Verda Erman, piano
- Verda Ün, piano
- Veriko Tchumburidze, violin
- Zeynep Üçbaşaran, piano

=== Singers ===
- Evelyn Baghtcheban, opera
- Jaklin Çarkçı, opera
- Meral Menderes, opera
- Mesude Çağlayan, opera
- Saadet İkesus Altan, opera
- Selma Emiroğlu, opera
- Semiha Berksoy, opera

== Gallery ==
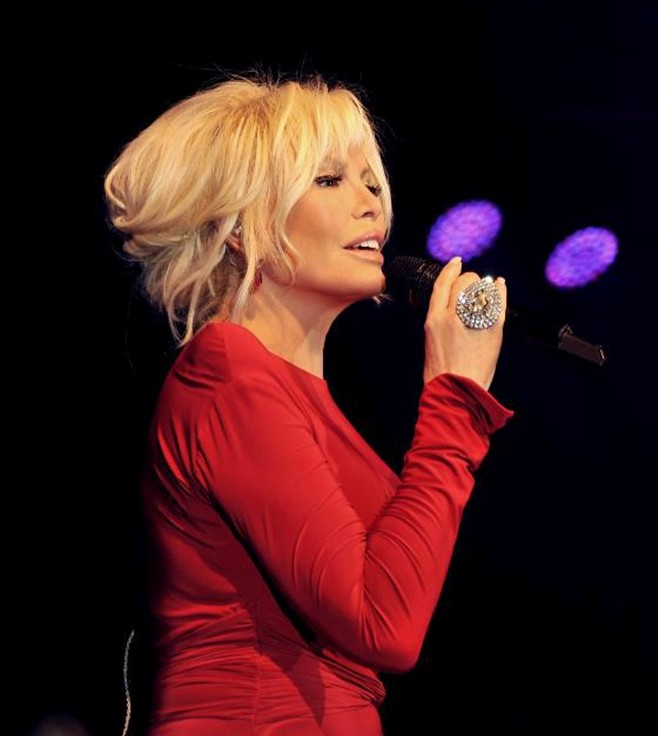
Ajda Pekkan

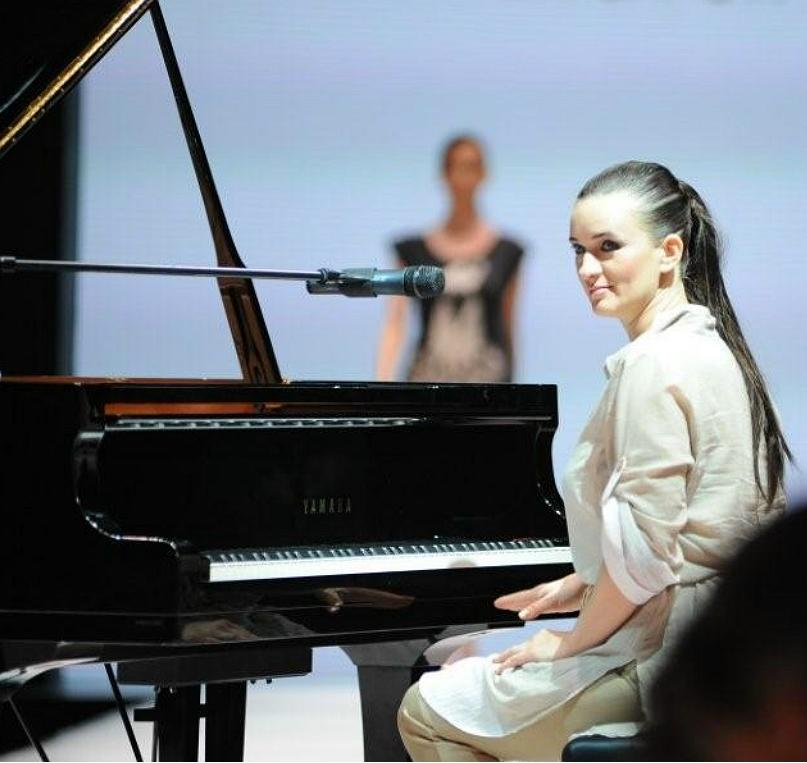
Anjelika Akbar

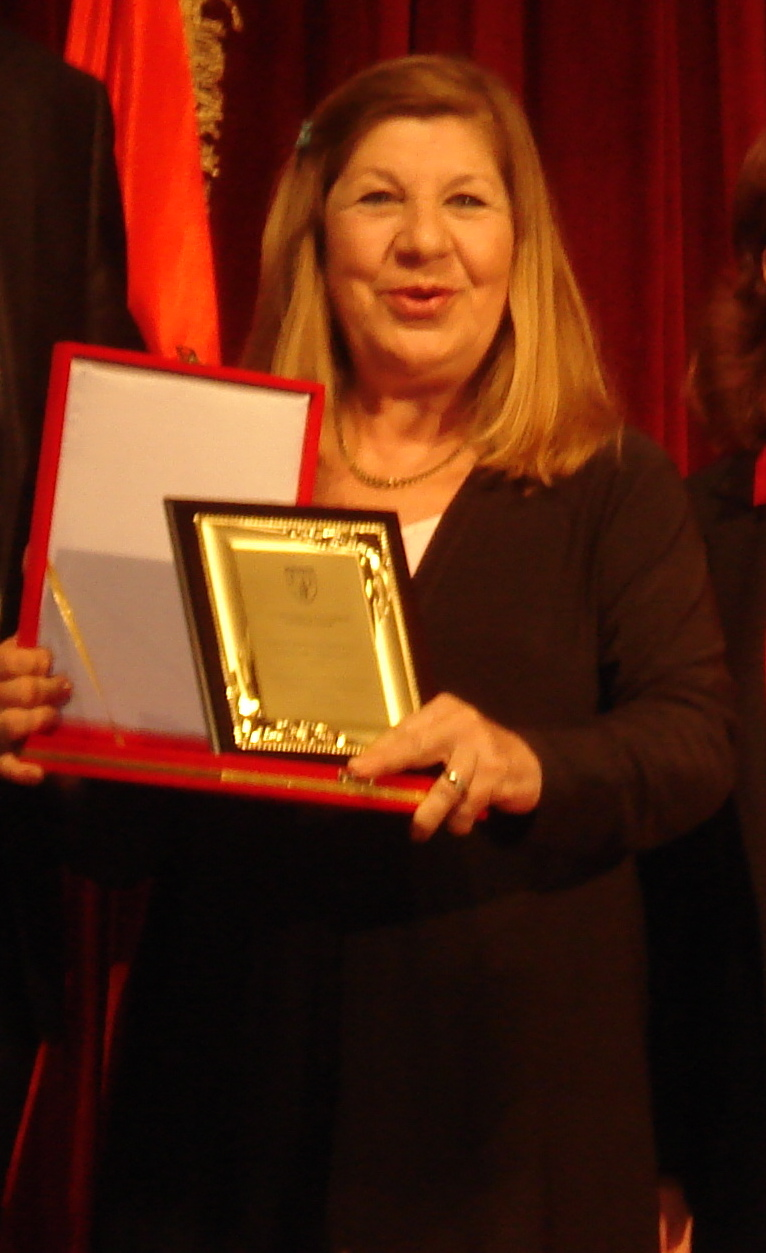
Ayla Algan

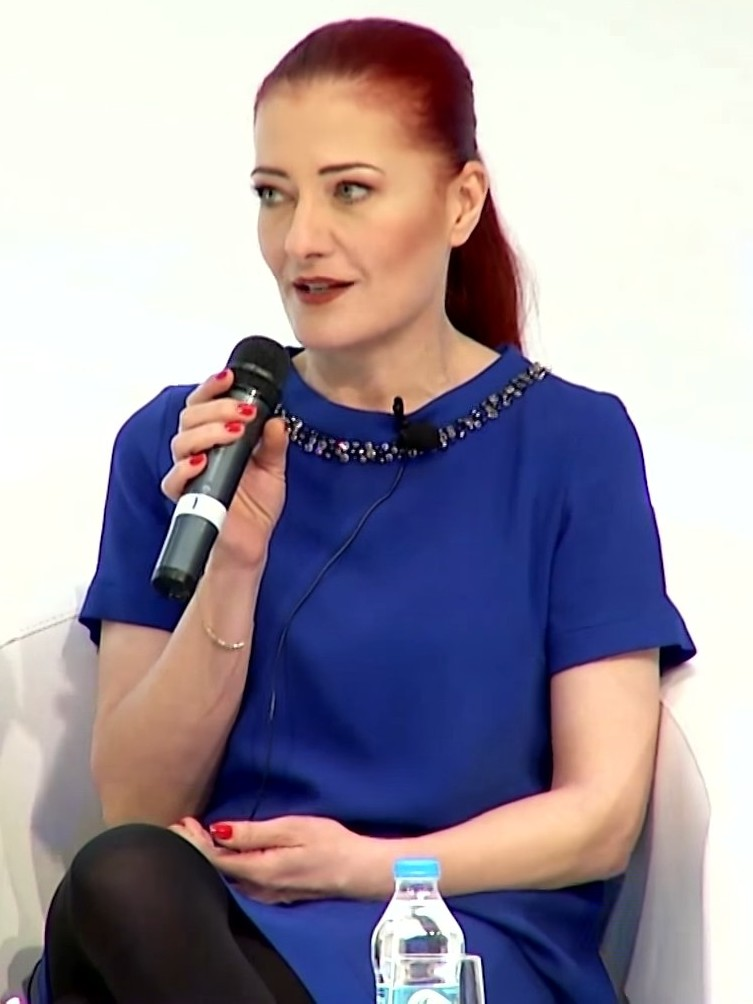
Canan Erçetin

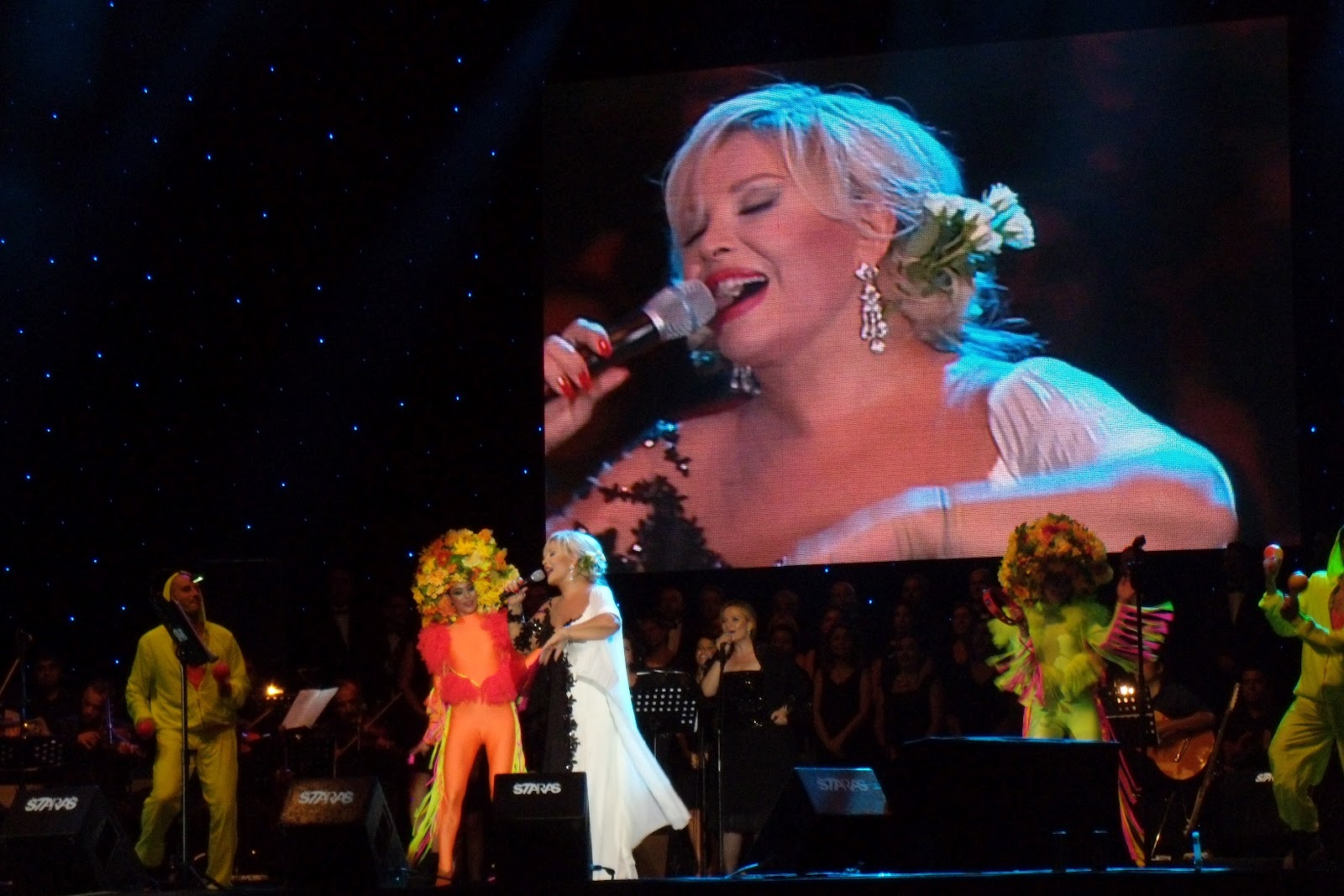
Emel Sayın

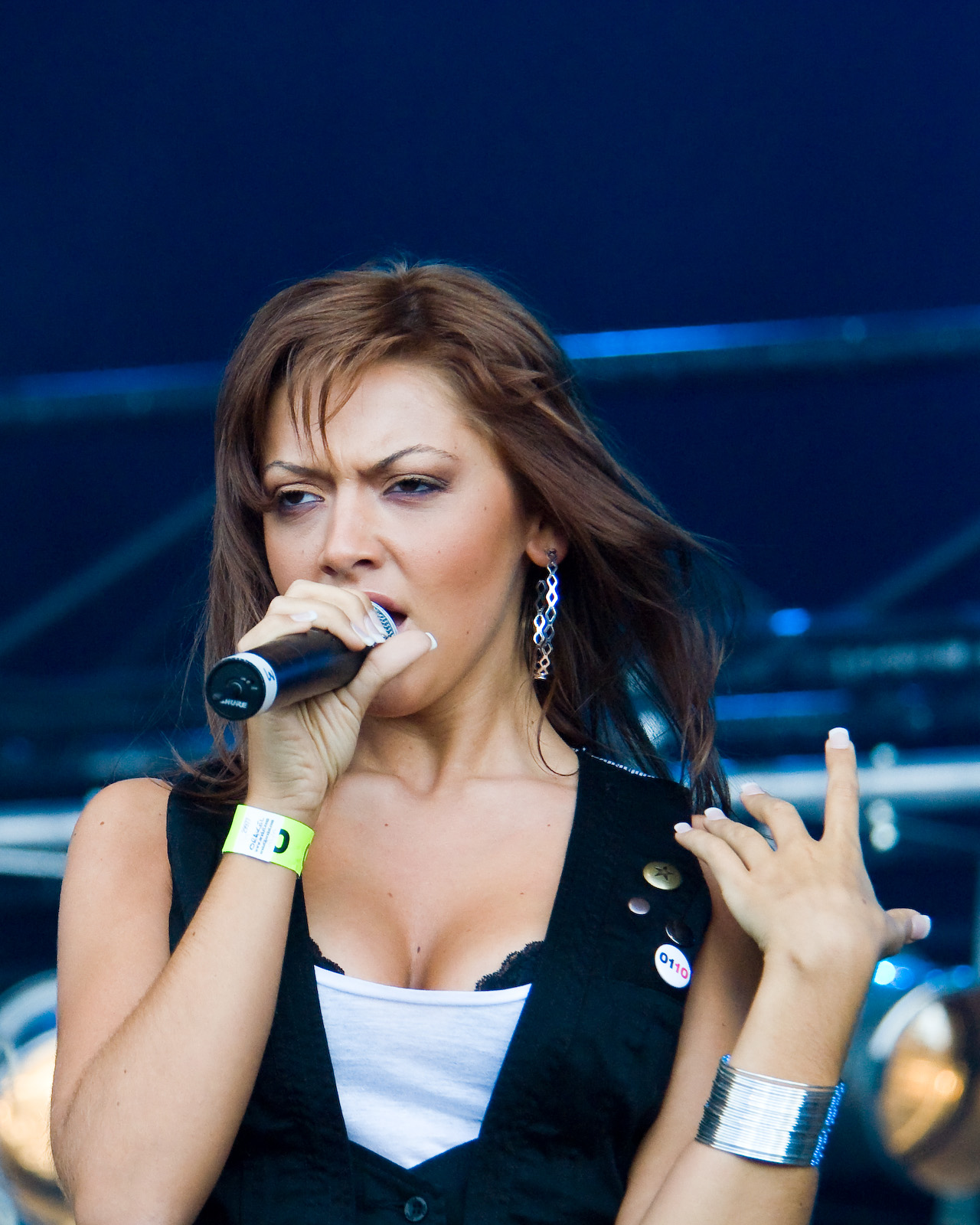
Hadise Açıkgöz

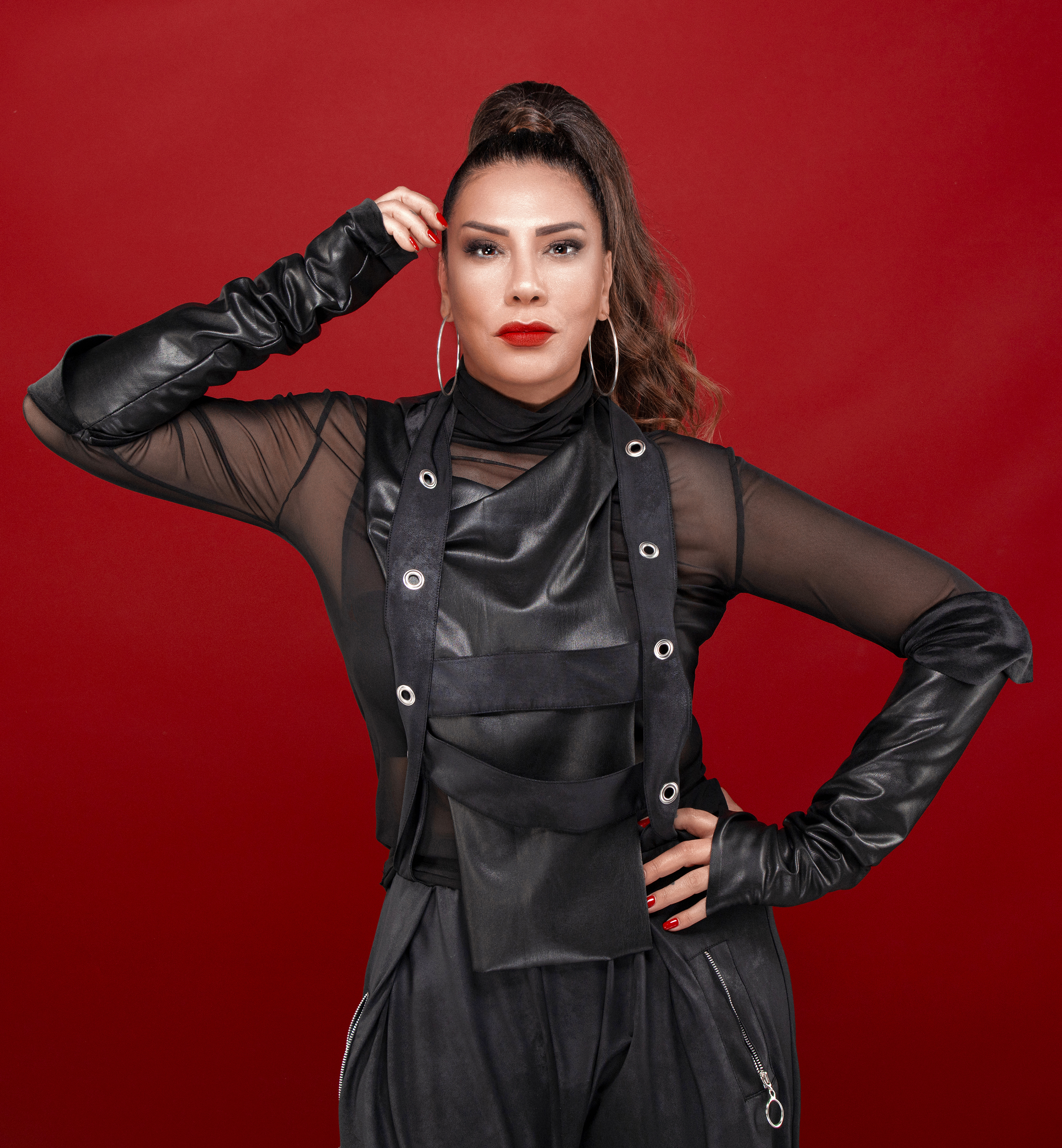
Işın Karaca

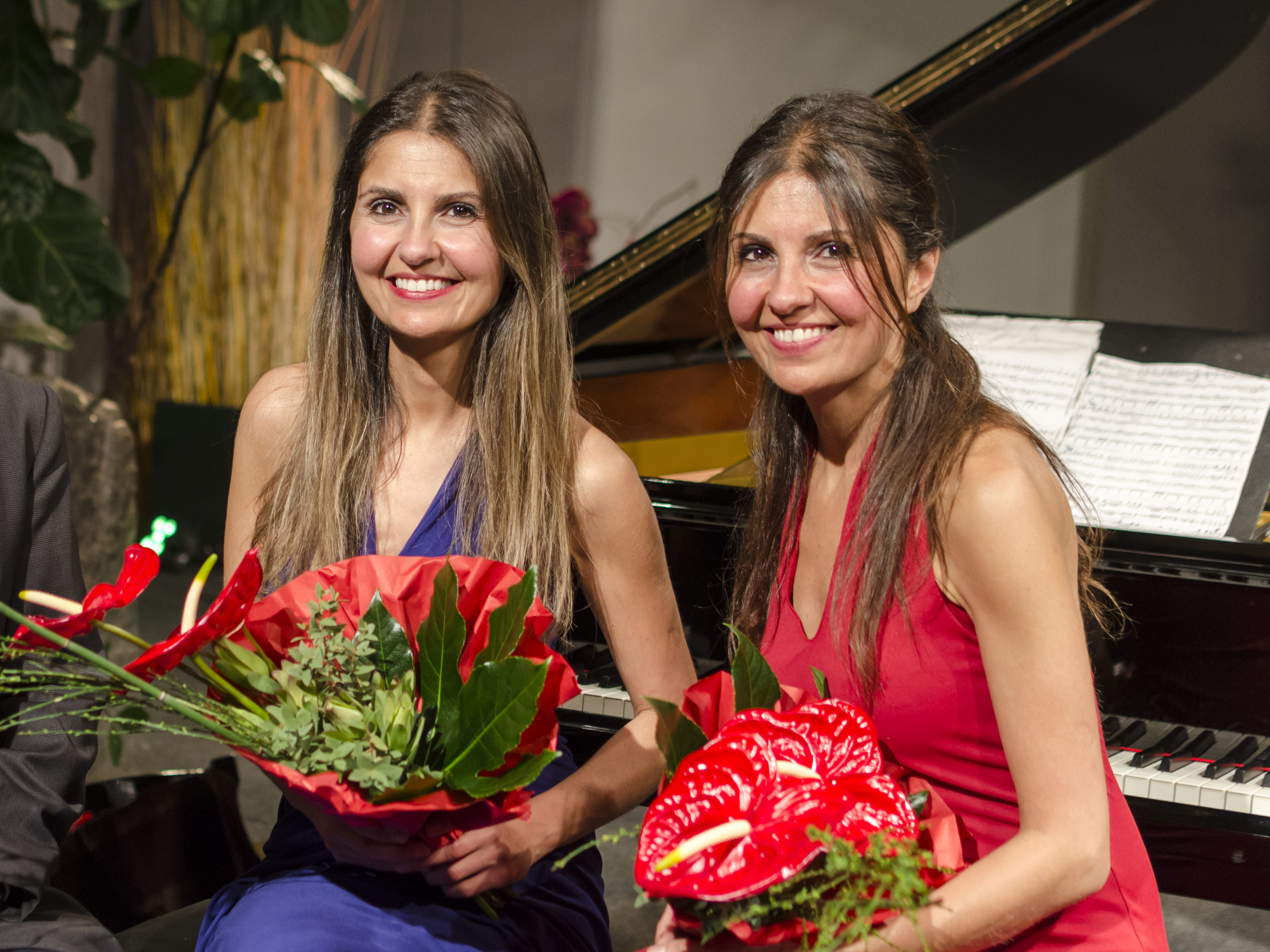
Önder Sisters

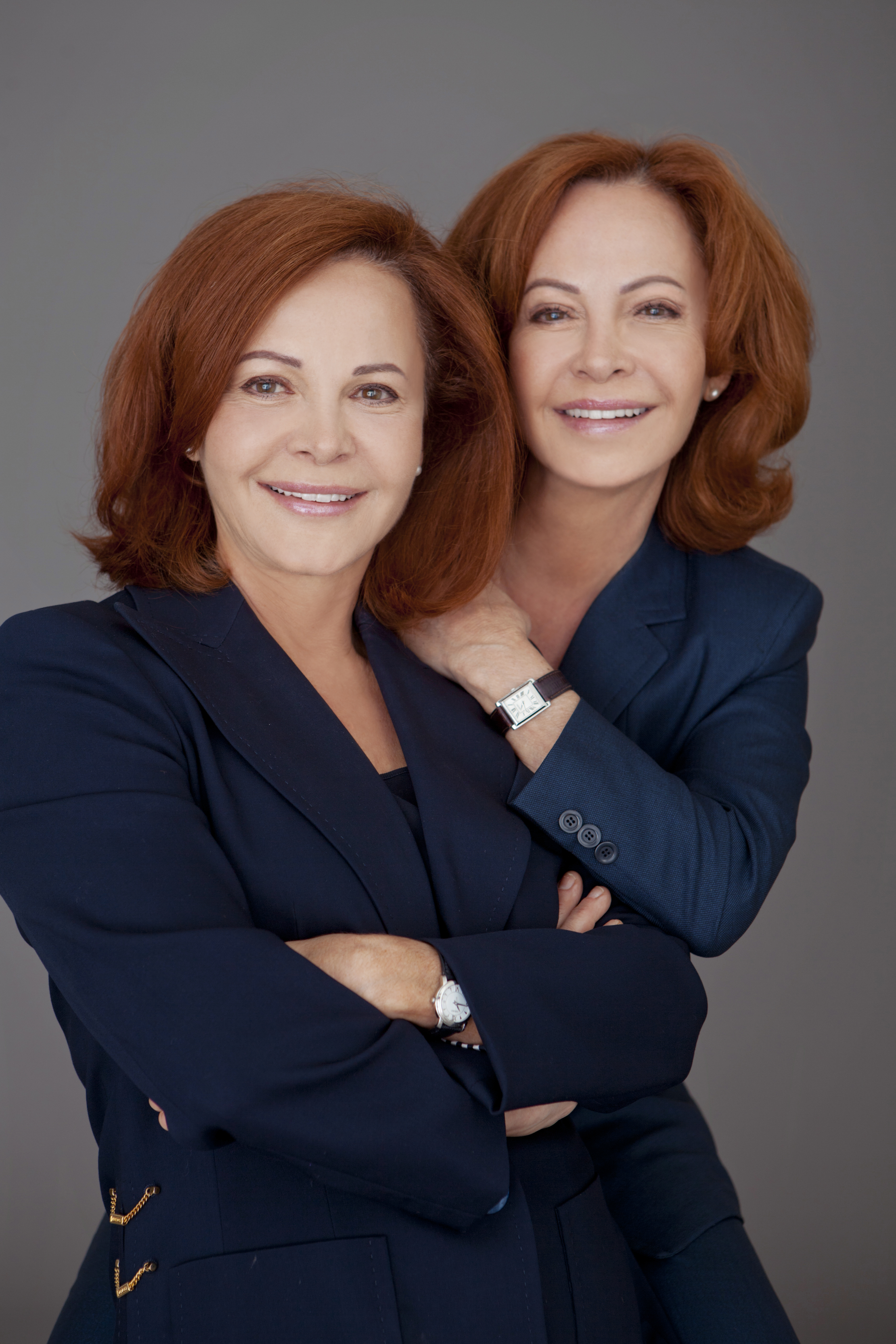
Pekinel sisters

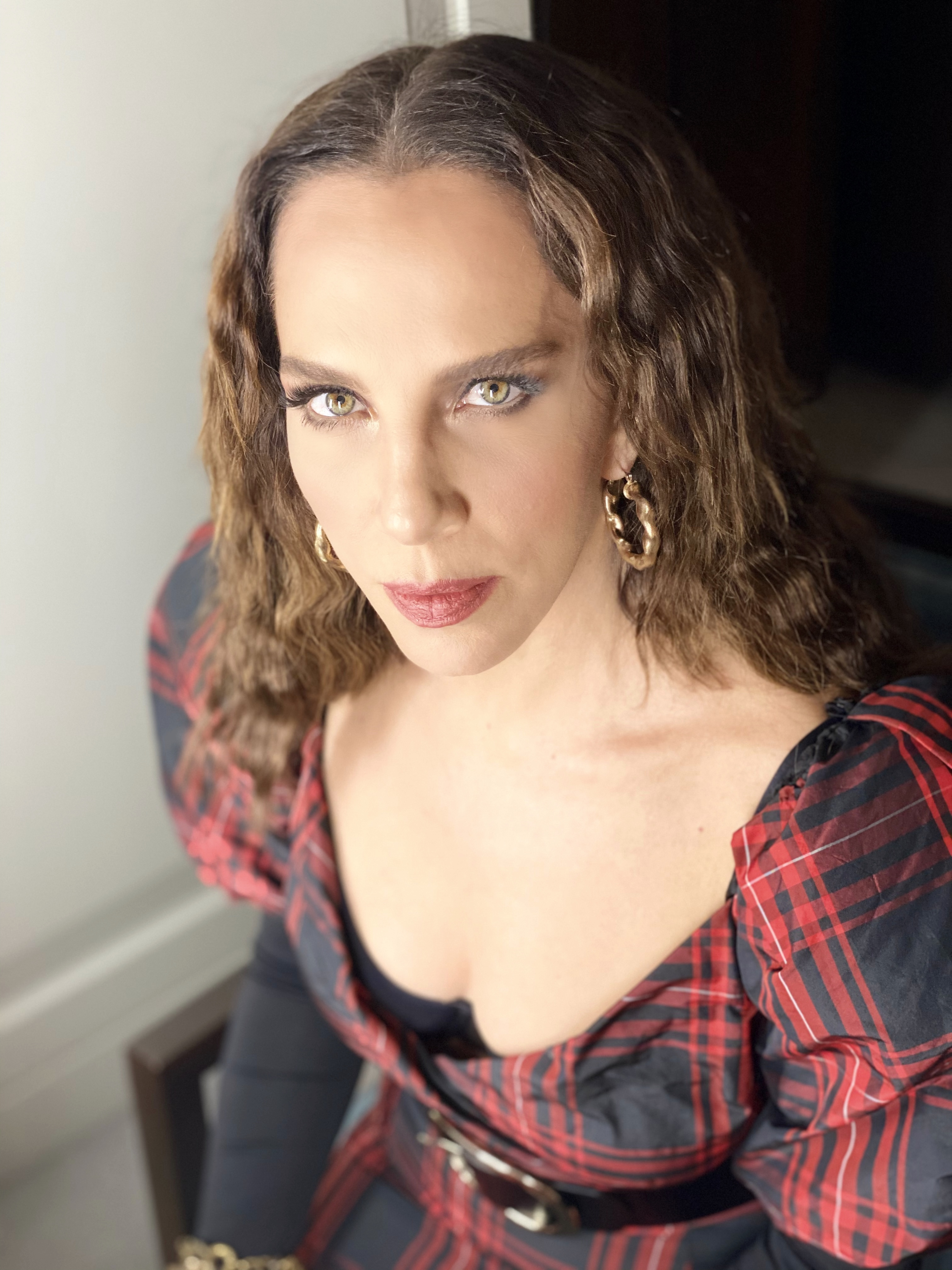
Sertab Erener

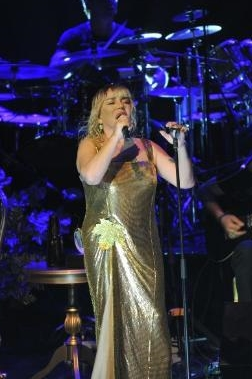
Sezen Aksu

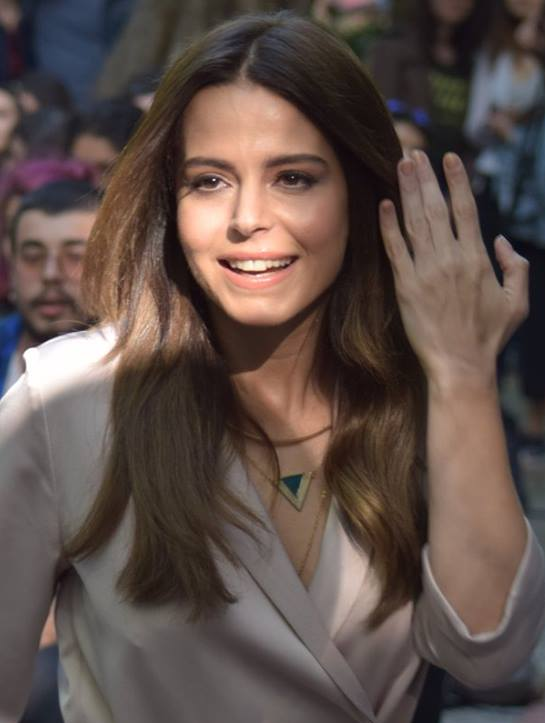
Simge Sağın

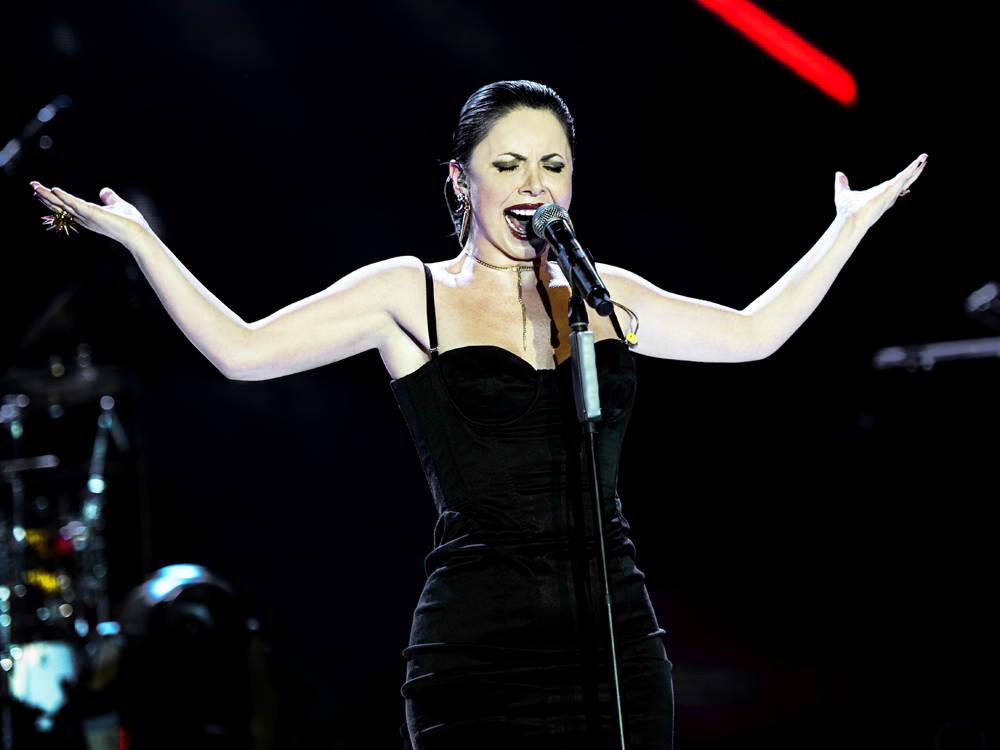
Şebnem Ferah

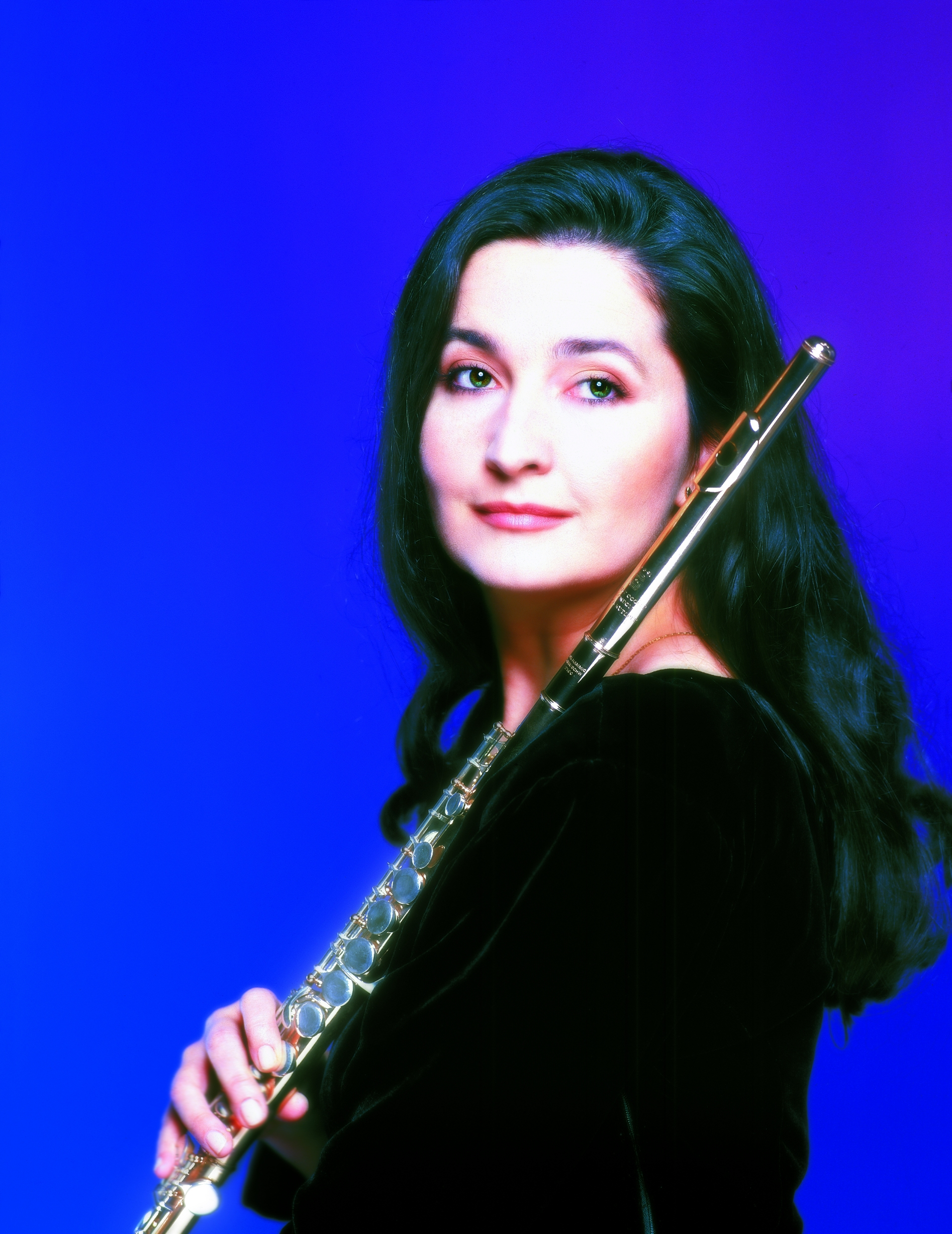
Şefika Kutluer

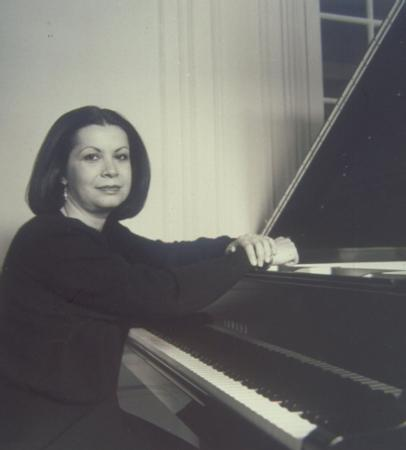
Verda Erman

== See also ==
- Music of Turkey
