= Turkey in the Eurovision Song Contest 1975 =

- Eurovision Song Contest 1975
- Participating broadcaster: Türkiye Radyo ve Televizyon Kurumu (TRT)
- Country: Turkey
- Selection process: 1975 Eurovision TRT Türk Hafif Müziği Şarkı Yarışması
- Selection date: 9 February 1975

Competing entry
- Song: "Seninle Bir Dakika"
- Artist: Semiha Yankı
- Songwriters: Kemal Ebcioğlu; Hikmet Münir Ebcioğlu

Placement
- Final result: 19th, 3 points

Participation chronology

Turkey was represented at the Eurovision Song Contest 1975 with the song "Seninle Bir Dakika", composed by Kemal Ebcioğlu, with lyrics by Hikmet Münir Ebcioğlu, and performed by Semiha Yankı. The Turkish participating broadcaster, Türkiye Radyo ve Televizyon Kurumu (TRT), selected its entry through a national final. This was the first-ever entry from Turkey in the Eurovision Song Contest, and the first-ever entry performed in Turkish in the contest.

== Before Eurovision ==
Prior to the confirmation of participation, TRT made few attempts to make its debut in the Eurovision Song Contest. In 1974, TRT expressed interest to debut in the 1974 contest, but was too late to join, as the scoreboard had already begun construction.

In July 1974, TRT announced to its viewers that it had plans to make its debut in the Eurovision Song Contest in 1975. A board of TRT members in Ankara, consisting of İskender Salgir, Bülend Özveren, and Erol Okman, ultimately agreed on participation.

=== 1975 Eurovision TRT Türk Hafif Müziği Şarkı Yarışması ===
The Turkish entry for the Eurovision Song Contest 1975 was chosen during a national final: 1975 Eurovision TRT Türk Hafif Müziği Şarkı Yarışması.

==== Competing entries ====
A total of 106 songs were submitted to the Turkish Radio and Television Corporation (TRT), with 17 bring shortlisted by a selection committee for the national final. In early 1975, "Boşver" performed by Nilüfer was withdrawn from the selection due to plagiarism claims. "Umut" performed by Şenay was also withdrawn as Şerif Yüzbaşıoğlu, his wife, was a member of the committee.

On 6 February 1975, the selection committee selected the 8 songs which would compete in the televised final out of the 106 songs that were submitted. The songs were accompanied by Timur Selçuk with Orchestra 75.

Semifinal – 6 February 1975
Artist(s)	Song	Songwriter(s)		Result
Artist(s)	Song	Composer(s)	Lyricist(s)	Result
Ali Rıza Binboğa	"Yarınlar"	Ali Rıza Binboğa		Qualified
Atilla Atasoy	"Dilenci"	Atilla Atasoy		Qualified
Cahit Oben	"Özlenen sevgì"	Cahit Oben	Mehmet Teoman	—N/a
Cici Kızlar	"Delisin"	Attila Özdemiroğlu		Qualified
Esin Afşar	"Canı sıkılan adam"	Esin Afşar		—N/a
Füsun Önal	"Minik kuş"	Attila Özdemiroğlu	Çiğdem Talu	Qualified
Gökhan Abur	"Bir gün karşılaşırsak"	Selmi Andak	Çiğdem Talu	—N/a
İskender Doğan	"Günahsızlar"	İskender Doğan		—N/a
Nejat and Reha	"Caniko"	Nejat Yavaşoğulları		—N/a
~~Nilüfer~~	~~"Boşver"~~	Nahman Varon	~~Tuğrul Dağcı~~	~~Withdrew~~
Semiha Yankı	"Seninle bir dakika"	Kemal Ebcioğlu	Hikmet Münir Ebcioğlu	Qualified
Serter Bağcan	"Mümkün değil"	Serter Bağcan		Qualified
~~Şenay~~	~~"Umut"~~	~~Selçuk Basri~~	~~Şenay~~	~~Withdrew~~
Uğur Akdora	"Anılar"	Uğur Akdora	Çiğdem Talu	—N/a
Yeliz Eken	"Hayalimdeki adam"	Selmi Andak	Çiğdem Talu	Qualified
Yeşim	"Böyle mi başlar?"	Cahit Oben	Mehmet Teoman	Qualified
Zerrin Yaşar	"Çiçekler"	Selim Atakan		—N/a

==== Final ====
The final took place on 9 February 1975 at the studios of TRT, hosted by Bülend Özveren. Eight songs competed and the winner was determined by a 50/50 combination of votes awarded by public postcard voting and an expert jury. Ali Rıza Binboğa was the winner of the postcard vote. As there was a tie at the end of the voting, the final winner was determined by giving the two winning singers two envelopes to choose between – one being a blank envelope and the other one containing the message "the song which will represent Turkey in Sweden", which was chosen by Semiha Yankı.

Final – 9 February 1975
R/O	Artist	Song	Public Points	Public Rank	Jury Points	Jury Rank	Total	Rank
1	Yeşim	"Böyle mi başlar?"	2,633	8	163	5	17	8
2	Cici Kızlar	"Delisin"	14,071	2	254	2	28	2
3	Atilla Atasoy	"Dilenci"	7,769	4	167	4	24	3
4	Yeliz	"Hayalimdeki adam"	7,644	5	192	3	24	3
5	Füsun Önal	"Minik kuş"	3,928	7	162	6	19	5
6	Serter Bağcan	"Mümkün değil"	5,350	6	154	7	19	5
7	Semiha Yankı	"Seninle bir dakika"	8,257	3	283	1	28	1
8	Ali Rıza Binboğa	"Yarınlar"	27,162	1	126	8	18	7

== At Eurovision ==
The contest was broadcast on TRT Televizyon. The show was watched by 17 million viewers.

On the night of the contest Turkey performed thirteenth in the running order, proceeding Israel and preceding Monaco. The conductor at the contest was Timur Selçuk. At the close of the voting Turkey had received 3 points, finishing nineteenth and last place in the contest.

=== Voting ===
Points awarded to Turkey
Score	Country
12 points	
10 points	
8 points	
7 points	
6 points	
5 points	
4 points	
3 points	Monaco
2 points	
1 point	

Points awarded by Turkey
Score	Country
12 points	Portugal
10 points	Italy
8 points	Sweden
7 points	Switzerland
6 points	Israel
5 points	Luxembourg
4 points	Netherlands
3 points	Spain
2 points	Malta
1 point	France
