= Çiğdem Talu =

- Born: 31 October 1939
- Died: 28 May 1983 (aged 43)
- Occupations: Poet, songwriter
- Years active: 1963–1983

Çiğdem Talu (October 31, 1939 – May 28, 1983) was a Turkish poet and lyricist. The writer Ercüment Ekrem Talu was her grandfather.

Çiğdem wrote her first song "Ağlıyorum Yine", which was sung by Nilüfer and released on her single, "Kalbim Bir Pusula". The great success of this song led her to write songs for many other singers, among them for Yeliz and Füsun Önal. Turkey participated at the Eurovision Song Contest 1975 held in Stockholm, Sweden for the first time, and three songs written by Talu were in the qualification in Ankara.

That year, she met composer Melih Kibar and they started to make music together. Their first song, "İşte Öyle Bir Şey" sung by Erol Evgin was a great hit. From then on, Talu wrote and Kibar composed pop music songs for Evgin, which became hits. Talu and Kibar produced around 200 songs.

Talu wrote the lyrics for the play "Nereye Payidar", while the music was composed by Timur Selçuk. Many pop music singers, Nükhet Duru and Zerrin Özer included, used her lyrics.

She died of breast cancer in Istanbul. Following her death, a number of artists organized a series of concerts in her honor. In 2006, a number of her songs were put together as an album and sold.

Her daughter Zeynep also became a songwriter and music producer, who wrote the lyrics of the Turkish entry "Sev" at the Eurovision Song Contest 1995 held in Dublin, Ireland.
