= Egemen (disambiguation) =

Egemen is a Turkish language given name and surname. It may refer to:

- Egemen Bağış (born 1970), Turkish politician
- Egemen Güven (born 1996), Turkish basketball player
- Egemen Korkmaz (born 1982), Turkish football player
- Sibel Egemen (born 1958), Turkish singer

== See also ==
- Egemen, a Kyrgyz political group
- Yegemen Qazaqstan, a Kazakhstani newspaper
