= Şenay (singer) =

Turkish singer-songwriter

- Birth name: Şenay Ekiz
- Also known as: Şenay Yüzbaşıoğlu
- Born: 19 January 1947; Istanbul, Turkey
- Died: 4 January 2013 (aged 65); Istanbul, Turkey
- Genres: Anatolian rock
- Occupation(s): Singer, songwriter, musician
- Years active: 1965–1995

Şenay Yüzbaşıoğlu (née Ekiz, 19 January 1947– 4 January 2013), was a Turkish singer-songwriter professionally known as Şenay. She was famous for her Turkish pop songs with positive, humanist messages such as Hayat Bayram Olsa ("If Life Was A Holiday") and Sev Kardeşim ("Love, Brother"), as well as her 'nonsense' protest song against censorship, Honki Ponki.

== Life and career ==
Şenay Ekiz was born in Istanbul in 1947. In 1970, she married Şerif Yüzbaşıoğlu, a Turkish music producer, composer, and orchestra conductor. Following her marriage she became one of the most active singers of Turkey.

Şenay began singing in 1969, singing songs in both Turkish and English. Her first hit, Sev Kardeşim (a cover to the 1971 song "Shuv Itkhem" by Israeli duo Ilan & Ilanit) was in 1971, and became the song of the year. She produced a series of singles, among which Hayat Bayram Olsa and Açıl Susam Açıl were her most popular ones.

In 1975, Şenay represented Turkey in the Golden Orpheus international song contest in Bulgaria, where she ranked third. With seven awards from international festivals, Şenay became the most awarded Turkish pop singer at the time.

Şenay tried to participate twice in the national finals of the Eurovision Song Contests. In 1975, she withdrew due to her husband's membership in the competition jury. In 1981, she withdrew again after the death of her husband. The song Bigudi was sung by Füsun Önal in the contest and became the second after the song by Ayşegül Aldinç and the Modern Folk Üçlüsü.

=== Politics ===
In addition to music, Şenay made a name in politics by supporting Bülent Ecevit, the leader of the Republican People's Party who served as the Prime Minister of Turkey four times between 1974 and 2002.

Şenay would take to the stage before Ecevit and sing 'Sev Kardeşim' and 'Hayat Bayram Olsa'. The Turkish Radio and Television Corporation labeled Şenay's lyrics as 'leftist' and were banned.

=== Reaction to censorship, protest song ===
Şenay's song "Honki Ponki" was a disco-pop protest song released in 1980. The seemingly nonsense lyrics carry a hidden meaning as the song was released in reaction to Şenay being criticised for having "leftist" themes in her lyrics by the Turkish Radio and Television Corporation and subsequently having her music banned.

Despite the meaningless lyrics, the song received a positive reaction, breaking sales records. It was reissued in 1981 in Germany and global rights were acquired by the Dutch company CNR.

In 2002, singer Faruk K covered Honki Ponki. The reaction was positive and he stated, "the song Honki Ponki opened the door to festivals for me. I bought an apartment with the money from that song."

In 2021, presenter of O Ses Türkiye ("The Voice, Turkey") Acun Ilıcalı surprised the show's jury members by singing Honki Ponki from memory though he had previously been teased for being unfamiliar with traditional Turkish songs.

== Death ==
After her husband's death in 1981, Şenay retired from making music and became socially withdrawn, reportedly not even communicating with friends.

Şenay spent her final days in her brother's house in Istanbul, and on 4 January 2013, at the age of 65, she died of respiratory failure .

Her wish to be buried next to her husband was unable to be met because 'the grave deed could not be found'. A ceremony held at Dolmabahçe Mosque was attended by family and former CHP deputies. She was survived by a brother and a sister.

Şenay 's sister shared at her funeral: "Music was more than bread and water for her." and "Şenay is a neglected artist. She was an extremely elegant, extremely emotional, philosophical person who loved people. I think that art and artists are truly not valued at all in Turkey."

Turkish writer and politician, Mustafa Sarıgül spoke about Şenay's song 'Sev Kardeşim':

"The year was 1977. There was a rally in Taksim. The late Bülent Ecevit had a rally. I was also on duty at the rally. We thought about which song to play. We decided on dear Şenay's song 'Sev Kardeşim'. Her permission was obtained. The whole of Turkey was thrilled with the song Sev Kardeşim at the most magnificent rally of that period in Taksim." "There is still a need for Sev Kardeşim today. I wish we could sing those songs today. We could say "Sev Kardeşim" all over Turkey. If we had been politically worthy of the words in dear Şenay's song "Sev Kardeşim" in 1977, Turkey would be in a very different place today. Today, I say to Turkey, "Sev Kardeşim". Let's love each other regardless of religion, language, or culture. He left us unforgettable words."

== 45 rpm discography ==
Name	Year
Ayrılalım Ağlamadan-Sil Gözyaşlarını	1968
Sen de İç Benimle-Sakla Kimse Görmesin	1969
Çapkın Adam-Beni Sevmekten Korkma	1970
Benim olursan-Sev Kardeşim	1971
Nerdeyiz-En Büyük Şansın Yaşıyor Olman	1972
Hayat Bayram Olsa-Nen Var Canım Kardeşim	1973
Beyaz Ülke-Gerçek Nerede	1974
Açıl Susam Açıl-Ve Ağlıyorum	1975
Varlar Yoklar-Dön Artık	1975
Sessiz Bir Yer -Dünden Bugüne	1977
Honki Ponki-Honkey Ponkey	1980
I address you-Who were you	1980 ?

== Album discography ==
Name	Year
Шенай / Şenai (Balkanton/Bulgaria)	1979
Şenay (Honki Ponki) (EMI/Turkey)	1980
