= Cici Kızlar =

Turkish female vocal trio

- Origin: Turkey
- Genres: Rock
- Years active: 1974–1976
- Past members: Şebnem Aksu; Birnur Bilginoğlu; Sibel Egemen; Bilgen Bengü (in 1976)

Cici Kızlar (literally "Cute Girls") were a Turkish female vocal trio.

The group initially was composed of three singers, Şebnem Aksu, Birnur Bilginoğlu and Sibel Egemen. Sibel Egemen left the group due to the difficulties she felt in juggling education and music. When they decided to enter Turkish preselection for the Eurovision Song Contest in 1975, Bilgen Bengü was also included in the group. Their entry was Delisin (You're mad), a dynamic song composed by Atilla Özdemiroğlu. They received a high score (the second highest after Ali Rıza Binboğa) from the people's jury and they shared the first place with Semiha Yankı who had received a higher score from the professional jury. Turkey's entry to the contest was determined by casting lots and they lost to Semiha Yankı.

However, Delisin became a hit and they produced other 45 rpm records in rapid succession. They also acted in a film named after Delisin with Tarık Akan. But the group was short-lived. By the end of 1976, the group was dissolved. Bilgen Bengü (nicknamed Kıvırcık, "curly") was the only member of the group who continued to have a music career.. Sibel Egemen also had a solo music career between 1975 and 1993. After releasing her last album, she left the music scene and began work as an expert of public relations at Yurtbank between 1995 and 2005. She then moved to Izmir and has been a professor of Public Relations and Advertising at the Faculty of Communications at Ege University since 2005.

== Discography ==
Type	Name	Year
45 rpm
45 rpm	Olmaz ki-Bak şu çocuğa	1974
45 rpm	Delisin-Rengarenk	1975
45 rpm	I-Ih-Gülebilmez	1975
45 rpm	Gencim Yaşarım-Deli gönlüm	1975
45 rpm	Sevs sev sev-Uçtu uçtu	1975
LP
LP	Delisin LP	1976
LP	Bak bir varmış LP	2002
