= Çetin Alp =

Turkish musician

- Also known as: Çetin Alp
- Born: Çetin Küçükarslan; 21 June 1947; Malatya, Turkey
- Died: 18 May 2004 (aged 56) Istanbul, Turkey
- Occupation: Singer
- Years active: 1970–1990
- Labels: Topkapı Plak, Yonca Plak, Öncü Plak, Diskotür Plak

Çetin Küçükarslan, better known by his stage name Çetin Alp (21 June 1947 – 18 May 2004), was a Turkish singer.

== Life ==
He was born in Malatya. Alp married three times, the first of which was to Ergül Kuğuoğlu. From this marriage he had twin daughters Fulya and Filiz (b. 1970) and son Ahmet (b. 1976). He divorced his second wife, Şermin Küçükaslan, on 19 November 1982. His third marriage was to Suna Yıldızoğlu, which lasted for 9 years.

The artist, who had a heart problem for a long time, had been angioed a few years before his death and had a stent placed in his heart, however, his treatment process was slow due to his lack of one kidney.

== Career ==
His career started in the 1970s with winning the competition Altın Ses. In these years, he released a Greek song that had been written by Sezen Cumhur Önal. The song became a hit, sold 500,000 copies, and earned him a golden certificate. He later released the song Son Defa Görsem', which became a hit as well. He later worked with Yurdaer Doğulu and Zekai Apaydın's orchestra, and following the Eurovision, he won third place at the 'World Singer Contest' in Los Angeles. He also won the first place in the 'Golden Orfe' competition held in Bulgaria in 1990. He continued his career together with his English ex-wife Suna Yıldızoğlu for nine years, and despite releasing many songs, he did not release a studio album. He represented Turkey together with Kısa Dalga Vocal Group at the Eurovision Song Contest 1983, performing the song "Opera", and was the target of devastating criticism for years afterwards due to his poor performance at the contest, having earned zero points and placing last. He passed three days following the final of the Eurovision Song Contest 2004 held in Istanbul following Turkey's first victory the year prior; a week prior, he stated in an interview with Turkish public broadcaster TRT that "the sad results he received in Munich made him very upset and he had not recovered for years".

== Discography ==
=== Songs ===
Topkapı Plak

- Sen Bir Yana, Dünya Bir Yana / Herşeyi Unutalım
- Günah Bize / Meçhul Karanlık (1970)
- Ayrılık Yok Artık / Bir Gün Biter Demiştin (1972)

Yonca Plak

- Bir Kadeh Atınca Birşeyin Kalmaz / Hatıralar (1973)

Öncü Plak

- Çek Çek / Sana Ne Olmuş (1978)
- Elveda (1979 Eurovision Finale Katılan Şarkı) / Son Defa Görsem (1979)
- Son Olsun / Sonsuz Aşk (Suna Yıldızoğlu ile) (1981)

Diskotür Plak

- Opera (Türkçe) / Opera (İngilizce) (1983)

=== Other ===
- Son Defa (1986 Kuşadası Golden Pigeon Music Competition)

Awards and achievements
Preceded by Neco with "Hani?"	Turkey in the Eurovision Song Contest; 1983	Succeeded by Beş Yıl Önce, On Yıl Sonra with "Halay"
