= Gökhan Abur =

Turkish musician and meteorologist (1943–2023)

- Born: 27 September 1943; Afyonkarahisar, Turkey
- Died: 15 September 2023 (aged 80); Istanbul, Turkey
- Burial place: Çengelköy Cemetery
- Other name: "Gökhan"
- Education: Istanbul Technical University
- Occupations: Weather presenter, musician
- Employer(s): Kandilli Observatory and Earthquake Research Institute (KOERI); Açık Radyo; NTV "Kargalar Kafeste" music band
- Notable work: Bir Gün Karşılaşırsak (1975)
- Television: NTV Weather
- Children: 3
- Awards: Istanbul Aydın University Communication Awards "Weather Anchor of the Year" award (2016)

Gökhan Abur or by his stage name Gökhan (27 September 1943 – 15 September 2023) was a Turkish musician and meteorologist. He came 8th in the Turkish qualifiers of the Eurovision Song Contest 1975 with his song entry titled "Bir Gün Karşılaşırsak".

== Biography ==
Gökhan Abur was born in Afyonkarahisar to a family of civil servants, Abur's father was from İzmir and his mother was from Istanbul. Due to his father's job as an officer, he lived in many parts of Turkey. He started primary school in Ankara and continued his primary school education life in Elazığ. When his father resigned from his job as an officer, his family moved to Istanbul, where he finished primary school. When Obur started his secondary school education, his family moved to Karabük upon his father returning to civil service. He finished his middle and high school education there.

Abur graduated from the Istanbul Technical University's Department of Meteorological Engineering. For many years, he worked at the Kandilli Observatory and Earthquake Research Institute (KOERI) Meteorology Department. He retired from his position as Meteorological Engineer at Kandilli Observatory in 2003.

Abur was interested in the sea and maritime. He gave out meteorology and weather forecasting lessons at Atlantis Yachting. He also produced a radio program called "Açık Deniz" on Açık Radyo from 2000 to 2002. Until his death in 2023, he was an editor-in-chief for weather bulletins at Turkish television channel NTV, which he also presented. Abur was awarded "Weather Anchor of the Year" at the Communication Awards organized by Istanbul Aydın University in 2016.

=== Musical career ===
During his high school years in Karabük, he founded an orchestra and started his musical life. He won the Meteorology Engineering Graduate Program at Istanbul Technical University and moved to Istanbul.

Abuz came fourth in the "Altın Ses Yarışması" organised by Egemen Bostancı and published by Hafta Sonu Newspaper in 1967. After his success in the contest, with the contributions of Fikret Şeneş, he started to work on records. Obuz has a total of 13 singles (45 rpm) and an album titled "Bir Gün Karşılaşırsak" (If We Meet One Day). He was also a singer in the music band "Kargalar Kafeste".

Abur participated in the celebrations of the 75th anniversary of the Republic with Deniz Arcak, Asu Maralman and a team from the State Opera Ballet in Mersin and Tarsus at the Mersin Opera House.

Abur participated in the 2011 revival of "The Rat Pack" held at Istanbul Grand Hyatt alongside Recep Aktuğ and İpek Dinç.

== Discography ==
=== Albums ===
Year	Album	Details
1975	Bir Gün Karşılaşırsak	Released by S&S, his first and only album. It consists of 12 parts.

== Personal life and death ==
Abur, who was married to Hülya Abur and had 3 children, two of whom were twins, died at the age of 80 in a hospital in Istanbul, where he had been receiving cancer treatment for a while. His funeral was taken from Şakirin Mosque in Üsküdar Karacaahmet and buried in Çengelköy Cemetery.
