= Auntie (song) =

Auntie is a song released by Philips Records in 1972 to celebrate the fiftieth anniversary of the BBC. It is named after the affectionate nickname for the corporation, and features artists from six countries. The singers are Hildegard Knef, Enrico Macias, Sandra & Andres, Alice Babs, Demis Roussos and Vicky Leandros. The composer is the Dutch musician Hans van Hemert.

Though the single peaked at number four in the Netherlands and number five in Greece, it failed to chart in the United Kingdom. Critics observed similarities between Van Hemert's "Auntie" composition and "Those Were the Days", a 1968 hit by Mary Hopkin.

== Cover ==
"Auntie" was covered in Turkey by Nilüfer, Tanju Okan and Modern Folk Üçlüsü in 1973, under the title "Arkadaş Dur Bekle".

== Charts ==
Chart (1972–73)	Peak position
Greece (IFPI)	5
Netherlands (Dutch Top 40)	4
