= Çiğdem =

- Gender: Female

Origin
- Language: Turkish
- Meaning: "Crocus", "Colchicum", "Meadow Saffron"

Çiğdem is a common feminine Turkish given name. In Turkish, "Çiğdem" means "crocus", "colchicum", and/or "meadow saffron".

== People ==
=== Given name ===
- Çiğdem Akyol (born 1978), German journalist
- Çiğdem Balım Harding, American senior lecturer at Indiana University
- Çiğdem Belci (born 1987), Turkish footballer
- Çiğdem Can Rasna (born 1976), Turkish volleyball player
- Çiğdem Dede (born 1980), Turkish paralympic powerlifter
- Çiğdem Kağıtçıbaşı (1940–2017), Turkish scientist in social psychology
- Çiğdem Özyaman (born 1985), Turkish sport shooter
- Çiğdem Talu (1939–1983), Turkish pop music songwriter

== Places ==
- Çiğdem, Balya, a village
