= Tanju Okan =

Turkish singer (1938–1996)

- Born: 27 August 1938; İzmir, Turkey
- Died: 23 May 1996 (aged 57) İzmir, Turkey
- Genres: Anatolian rock, türkü
- Occupations: Singer, musician, actor
- Years active: 1961–1995

Tanju Okan (27 August 1938 – 23 May 1996) was a Turkish singer.

== Life ==
Okan was born in İzmir on 27 August 1938. He received his primary and secondary education in Manisa and Balıkesir. Afterwards, he went to Italy for vocal training. In 1961, he began singing professionally in Ankara and then in Istanbul. He married twice and was the father of a son. During the 1990s, he retired and began living in Urla, a small seaside town of the İzmir Province. He died from cirrhosis on 23 May 1996.

== Career ==
In the early 1960s, he was a solo singer in the Müfit Kiper orchestra. In 1964, he represented Turkey in the Balkan Music Festival, together with Tülay German and Erol Büyükburç. In the same year, he produced his first 45 rpm record. He had a powerful sound and could easily sing three styles of music popular in the 1960s in Turkey: new compositions, covers of Western music and arranged Turkish folklore music (türkü). In the 1970s, he sang two songs which became instant hits; In 1972 Öyle sarhoş olsam ki ("I wish I was so drunk") and in 1974 Kadınım ("My Woman"). In 1973, he featured on the multi-singer melody Arkadaş Dur Bekle (Turkish version of Auntie) together with Modern Folk Üçlüsü and Nilüfer.

He also starred in eleven movies.

== Discography ==
Albums

Year	Name
1975	Bütün Şarkılarım
1980	Yorgunum
1991	Kadınım / Kime ne
1992	Yıllar Sonra / Kırlangıç
1995	Tanju Okan 95
1999	Bir zamanlar-Best of Tanju Okan
2001	Bir zamanlar-Best of Tanju Okan (2)
2006	Bak bir varmış, bir yokmuş

He also contributed to several multi singer albums.

=== 45s ===
- İnan Yağcı Değilim / Maça Dolmuş (Sahibinin Sesi-1965)
- Kundurama Kum Doldu / Sta Sera Pago Io (Sahibinin Sesi-1965)
- Küçük Fatoşum / Ben Sokak Adamı (Sahibinin Sesi-1966)
- İki Yabancı / Sarhoş (Sahibinin Sesi-1967)
- Babam Gibi / Yaşanmaz Aynı Evde (duet with Rüçhan Çamay and Durul Gence 5) (Regal-1968)
- Hayat Üç Perdedir / Haydar Haydar (Regal-1968)
- Hasret / Ah Bir Zengin Olsam (Yonca-1970)
- Le Sourire De Mon Amour / S'il N'y Avait Que Toi Au Monde (Riviera-1970)
- Annem / Şansın Varsa (Arya-1971)
- O Gün Gelse / Hayat Bu Nermin (Arya-1971)
- Bir Falcı Vardı / Ağlayan Gözler (Balet-1971)
- Karadeniz Türküsü / Benim De Canım Var (Odeon-1971)
- Başlık Parası / Gelme Ölüm (Odeon-1972)
- Seni Hayatımca Sevdim / Öyle Sarhoş Olsam Ki (Fonex-1972)
- Koy Koy Koy / Çık Git İçimden (Philips-1972)
- Darla Dırlada / Yalancı (Fonex-1972)
- Birisi / Olamaz (Balet-1972)
- Darla Dırlada / Çağırdın Sana Koştum (duet with Ayten Alpman) (Melody-1972)
- Arkadaş Dur Bekle / Kim Ayırdı Sevenleri (duet with Modern Folk Üçlüsü and Nilüfer) (Philips-1973)
- Güzel Yok Mu İnsafın / Seni Sevdim Ben (Philips-1973)
- Ben Ağlarken Gülümserim / Her Gün Her Gece (Sinyal-1973)
- Bir Dost Bulamadım / İç İç Unutursun (Fonex-1973)
- Ben Bir Hiçmişim / Yolla Yolla (Diskotür-1974)
- Gözünde Yaşlarla / Sevince (Philips-1974)
- Kadınım / Yolculuk (Diskotür-1974)
- Şerefe / Aşkı Bulacaksın (Philips-1974)
- Benim Halkım / Biz Doğuştan Sanatçıyız (Diskotür-1975)
- Ayyaş / Var Mısın İçelim (İstanbul-1975)
- Kemancı / Gülünce Gözlerinin İçi Gülüyor (Gönül-1976)
- Dostlarım / Kaderim (Nova-1976)
- Yıldönümü / Deli Gibi Sevdim (Philips-1976)
- Parkta Yatıyorum / Çocukluğum (Philips-1978)

== Filmography ==
- Cübbeli Gelin, (1964)
- Şekerli Misin Vay Vay, (1965)
- Yalancının Mumu, (1965)
- Fakir Bir Kız Sevdim, (1966)
- Aşkın Kanunu, (1966)
- İçimdeki Alev, (1966)
- Berduş Kız]], (1970)
- Ah Bir Zengin Olsam, (1971)
- Cımbız Ali, (1971)
- Yırtık Niyazi,(1971)
- Kaynanam Kudurdu, (1973)
- Şiribim Şiribom, (1974)
- Ne Haber, (1976)
- Gazap Rüzgarı, (1982)
