= Çiğdem Can Rasna =

Turkish volleyball player (born 1976)

Çiğdem Can

Personal information
- Full name: Çiğdem Can
- Born: July 5, 1976 Istanbul, Turkey
- Height: 1.84 m (6 ft 0 in)
- Weight: 74 kg (163 lb)
- Spike: 316 cm (124 in)
- Block: 300 cm (120 in)

Volleyball information
- Current club: Fenerbahçe Acıbadem
- Number: 12

National team
- Years: Team
- 2000–present: Turkey
Honours
Women's volleyball
Representing Turkey
European Championships
Silver medal – second place	Turkey 2003	Team

Çiğdem Can (born July 5, 1976) is a Turkish volleyball player. She is 184 cm and plays as middle player. She has played for Fenerbahçe Acıbadem team since 2006 and wears number 12. Çiğdem is the team's captain. She has played 280 times for the national team. She has also played for Vakıfbank Güneş Sigorta, Eczacıbaşı and TOKI.

== Career ==
Club	Nation	Years
Vakıfbank Güneş Sigorta	Turkey	1994–1998
Eczacıbaşı SK	Turkey	1999–2004
Pulcher Berni Lodi	Italy	2004–2005
Emlak TOKI	Turkey	2005–2006
Fenerbahçe Acıbadem	Turkey	2006–2011

== Personal honors ==
- 13 times Turkish Women's League Champion
- 5 times Turkish Cup Champion
- 1 time 2005 Mediterranean Games Champion
- 1 time Women's CEV Top Teams Cup Champion
- 2 times Women's CEV Champions League Runner-Up
- 2008-09 Women's CEV Top Teams Cup 3rd place
- 2008-09 Aroma Women's Volleyball League Champion with Fenerbahçe Acıbadem
- 2009-10 Aroma Women's Volleyball League Champion with Fenerbahçe Acıbadem
- 2009 Turkish Cup Champion with Fenerbahçe Acıbadem
- 2009 Turkish Super Cup Champion with Fenerbahçe Acıbadem
- 2010 Turkish Super Cup Champion with Fenerbahçe Acıbadem
- 2009-10 CEV Champions League Runner-Up with Fenerbahçe Acıbadem
- 2010 FIVB World Club Championship Champion with Fenerbahçe Acıbadem
- 2010-11 CEV Champions League – Bronze medal, with Fenerbahçe Acıbadem
- 2010-11 Aroma Women's Volleyball League – Champion, with Fenerbahçe Acıbadem

== See also ==
- Turkish women in sports
