= Yeşim (singer) =

Turkish singer and songwriter (born 1956)

Yeşim Yılmaz
- Born: November 7, 1956 (age 69); Ankara, Turkey
- Genres: Turkish pop music
- Occupation: Singer-songwriter
- Instrument: Vocals
- Years active: 1974–1989

Yeşim Yılmaz (born November 7, 1956) is a Turkish singer and songwriter.

== Career ==
At the age of five she attended the Mithat Fenmen Ballet School in Ankara. She completed secondary school in Karabük for her father's job. She participated in amateur theater and represented the school in high school music competitions and the Antep-Elazığ folklore team. In the last years of her school life, she studied at the Station Art School in Istanbul. After graduating from high school, she returned to Ankara and continued studying at Kemal Eroğlu Music School where she started singing and solfege lessons. She met the journalist Atilla Güvenç with the recommendation of her teacher and later met Şanar Yurdatapan and started professional music life.

In 1974, she became famous for the song "No Such Thing". She competed to represent Turkey in the 1975 Eurovision with the song "Böyle Mi Başlar" and came 8th. Throughout her career, she had six sixty-four records and three albums. In 1989, after her last album Loneliness Not Easy, she left music and settled in Marmaris.

== Discography ==
=== 45's ===
- Olmaz Böyle Şey / Aşk Alfabesi (Diskotür-1974)
- Aslan Mehmedim / Barış Dersi (Diskotür-1974)
- Böyle Mi Başlar / Küçük Bey (Diskotür-1975)
- Aklın Neredeydi / Ne Var Ne Yok (Diskotür-1975)
- Hani Hani / Aşkın Ömrü Var Mı? (Diskotür-1976)
- Nereye Kadar / Hatırlar Mısın? (Türküola-1976)

=== Albums ===
- Doğuş (Türküola-1978) (Dervişan ile.)
- Al Kadehi Eline – Değiştin Sen Artık / Boğaziçi – Her Yerde Kar Var (Öncü-1982)
- Yalnızlık Kolay Değil (Nila-1989)
- Baha'nın 40 Yıllık Şarkıları (Ossi-2015) – "Dert"
