= Nesrin Sipahi =

Turkish singer

- Born: Nesrin Sipahi; 29 November 1934 (age 91); Yeşilköy, Istanbul, Turkey
- Genres: Turkish classical music
- Occupation: Singer

Nesrin Sipahi (born 29 November 1934) is a Turkish singer of Crimean Tatar origin specializing in Turkish music.

== Life ==
Nesrin Sipahi was born to Yusuf and Adile in Yeşilköy neighborhood of Bakırköy ilçe (district), Istanbul, Turkey on 29 November 1934. Her parents were of Crimean descent. Her two brothers, Nihat and Çetin were theatre actors. She graduated from Bakırköy High School. Following a short marriage in 1950, she remarried to Hasan Aldemir Sipahi on 23 January 1957. She has two sons; Yunus Emre born in 1957 and Candemir in 1968.

== Music career ==
While still in teens, she got interested in music. Although initially her genre was western music, she finally began singing Turkish music. In 1953, she entered Ankara Radio, which was considered as the main music training center at that time. In 1960, she resigned from the radio and began working as a stage performer in Ankara. Following concerts in Turkey, she also performed in many foreign countries. In her 1971-tour in the Soviet Union, she also sang in Azerbaijani, Russian and Armenian in addition to Turkish. She performed in the United States, Germany, France, Canada, Australia, Morocco, Tunisia, Syria, Egypt, Cyprus and Spain. She released about four hundred singles. She played only in one film; Kalbimdeki Serseri ("The Rascal in My Heart") in 1965. In 1974, she released Yaşa Fenerbahçe ("Long Live Fenerbahçe"), the fight song for the Fenerbahçe S.K., a cover of Y Viva España, quite out of her genre.

== Awards ==
She has a number of gold records. In 1998, she was honored with the title State Artist. In 2017, she was honored with a special award during a ceremony at the Presidential Complex and received her award from president Recep Tayyip Erdoğan.

== Albums ==
Beginning by 1970, she released LP s and CDs:

- 1970: (?):La Chanson D'Amour En Turquie
- 1970: Suat Sayın
- 1970: Ve İkinci Dünyası
- 1970: Yusuf Nalkesen'in Eserleri
- 1970: Nesrin Sipahi
- 1970: Avni Anıl'ın Eserleri
- 1971: Bir Bahar Akşamı
- 1972: Türk Sanat Müziğinden Seçmeler
- 1973: Ve Türk Sanat Müziğinin 12 Pırlantası
- 1973: Osman Nihat Akın'ın Seçme Eserleri
- 1983: Aşk Mevsime Bakmaz
- 1991: Nesrin Sipahi and The Kudsi Erguner Ensemble – Sharki (Love Songs Of Istanbul)
- 2009: Nesrin Sipahi'den Türküler
