= Modern Folk Üçlüsü =

Turkish music trio

- Origin: Turkey
- Genres: Anatolian rock, arranged Türkü
- Years active: 1969–present
- Members: Doğan Canku; Ahmet Kurtaran
- Past members: Selami Karaibrahimgil

Modern Folk Üçlüsü ("Modern Folklore Trio") is a Turkish music trio. As the name implies, their main source is Turkish folklore songs (Türkü).

== Early years ==
The group was founded in July 1969 by Doğan Canku, Ahmet Kurtaran and Selami Karaibrahimgil. In the same year they accompanied Esin Afşar in her song Bebek. In 1970, they began to produce their own records. In 1971 September two members of the group got married and they temporarily put a halt to their activities.

Beginning by the end of 1972 however they resumed their activities. Their new LP of 1973 included arranged form of Turkish art music and an example of Western music as well as their conventional genre. Also in 1973 they participated in singing a multi singer melody Arkadaş Dur Bekle (Turkish version of Auntie) and Kim Ayırdı Sevenleri, Turkish version of Une Belle Histoire, Michel Fugain's famous song together with Tanju Okan and Nilüfer. These songs were recorded as 45 rpm.

== Music contests ==
The group participated in Seoul Music competition in 1978 with Ali Kocatepe. They also attempted to represent Turkey in the Eurovision Song Contests 1978 and 1981; in the first case with Nükhet Duru and in the second case with Ayşegül Aldinç. They took third place in 1978 and first place in 1981. Nevertheless, in the Eurovision Song Contest 1981 in Dublin, they gained only 9 points and shared 18th place with Portugal.

== Later years ==
During the 1990s they concentrated on the concerts. One of the important CDs in the 1990s was İstanbul Şarkıları (Songs of İstanbul) with Emel Sayın. But that CD was made by Yapı ve Kredi Bankası, a bank and was not released to public. After 2000 they released their own albums. Original members of the band haven't changed except period between 1995 and 1999, when Doğan Canku was replaced by Yavuz Çetin.

Selami Karaibrahimgil died on 28 December 2024, at the age of 80.

== Discography ==
=== 45 rpms ===
- Deriko & Ali Paşa Ağıdı (1970)
- Sarhoş Oğlan & Leblebi (1970)
- Tello & Su Gelir Ark Uyanır (1970)
- Diley Diley Yar & Gelin Ayşe (1970)
- Klasikler I & Ağlamak Geliyor İçimden (1973)
- Arkadaş Dur Bekle & Kim Ayırdı Sevenleri ? (1973) (With Tanju Okan and Nilüfer) (1973)
- Hiç Belli Olmaz & Unutalım Her Derdi (1973)
- Dözerem & Dudilli (1974)
- Gecelerim & Elif (1975)
- Dostluğa Davet & Takalar (1978) (As "Anatolia Major" with Nükhet Duru)
- Dönme Dolap (With Ayşegül Aldinç) & Miras (It was sung by Coşkun Demir) (1981)

=== Albums (As LP, MC and CD) ===
Year	Name
1971	Modern folk Üçlüsü
1975	40 yıl sonra
1978	Takalar
1979	Çocuklarımız için
1980	Pop
1985	Çocuklarımız için
1993	Nüket Duru klasikleri
1993	Ali Kocatepe Şarkıları
1996	Bir doğru Nota öyküsü
1996	İstanbul Şarkıları
2001	Bizimtepe Konseri
2001	Kaç yıl geçti aradan
2006	Çocuklarımız için
2007	Çeyrek
2009	Pop Fol Leblebi
2009	Çocuklara şiirler ve şarkılar
2010	40 yılın öyküsü

=== Doğan Canku (Solo) ===
- Doğan Canku (1981, LP, 1 Numara Plakçılık)
- Köçekçeler (1987, MC, Kent; CD version was later released by EMI)
- Sonsuza Dek & Ayrılık (1990, Gökalp Plakçılık, MC, CD version was later released by Ada Müzik)
- Doğa-n'ın Uyanışı (2000, Ada Müzik, CD)
