= Işıl German =

Turkish singer

- Born: 1953; Ankara, Turkey
- Died: 2016 (aged 62–63) Kuşadası, Turkey
- Genres: Turkish pop music
- Occupation: Singer
- Years active: 1972–1981

Işıl German (1953–2016) was a female Turkish singer.

== Biography ==
Işıl German was born in Ankara, Turkey in 1953. She graduated from the ballet section of the Conservatory of Ankara University and began her music career as a stage performer in Ankara in 1972. In 1975, she went to Istanbul to release five singles. In 1979, she participated in the Turkish finals of the Eurovision song contest.

She returned to Ankara, and in 1981, she composed a film score for a film in which she also appeared.

Işıl German died due to a heart attack in Kuşadası, Aydın Province on 16 July 2016. She was laid to rest in the local Adalızade Cemetery.

== Discography ==
- 1975: Sen Gelince/Aşk Yolu
- 1976: Aşkın Kaderi/Baksana Bana
- 1977: Gelsin Aklın Başına/Biliyorum Sensin O
- 1977: Benim Şarkım/Ağlıyorsam Sen Aldırma
- 1978: Divane Gönlüm/Bitti Ama İz Bıraktı
