= Beş Yıl Önce, On Yıl Sonra =

Turkish band

Beş Yıl Önce, On Yıl Sonra (Five Years Ago, Ten Years Later) was a Turkish band of the 1980s.

They represented Turkey at the Eurovision Song Contest 1984 with the song Halay and reached 12th position and 37 points.

The members of the band were Nilgün Onatkut, Atakan Ünüvar, Mehmet Horoz, and Şebgün Tansel.

== Sources ==
Information about the band Beş Yıl Önce, On Yıl Sonra (5 years ago, 10 years later) was a Turkish band of the 1980s. They built a reputation for singing harmonies, being the Turkish answer to ABBA.

Having failed to be the 1983 representatives, when finishing 2nd in the Turkish hits, they represented Turkey at the Eurovision Song Contest 1984 with the song Halay. They finished in 12th position with a total of 37 points.

The members of the band were Nilgün Onatkut (1982-1987), Atakan Ünüvar, Mehmet Horoz, and Esma Erdem (1983-1987), Şebgün Tansel (1982-1983), Didem Hekimoğlu (1987-1988) and Seda Ünüvar, who is the daughter of Atakan Ünüvar (2001).

== Albums ==
- Beş Yıl Önce On Yıl Sonra (1982)
- 5 Vals 10 Tango (1983)
- Ajda Pekkan Ve Beş Yıl Önce On Yıl Sonra (1985)
- Extra (1985)
- Beş Yıl Önce On Yıl Sonra (1987)
- Dört Mevsim (1988)
- Biraz Müzik (2001)

Awards and achievements
Preceded by Çetin Alp & The Short Waves with "Opera"	Turkey in the Eurovision Song Contest; 1984	Succeeded by MFÖ with "Didai didai dai"
