= Turkey in the Eurovision Song Contest 1984 =

- Eurovision Song Contest 1984
- Participating broadcaster: Turkish Radio and Television Corporation (TRT)
- Country: Turkey
- Selection process: 8. Eurovision Şarkı Yarışması Türkiye Finali
- Selection date: 25 February 1984

Competing entry
- Song: "Halay"
- Artist: Beş Yıl Önce, On Yıl Sonra
- Songwriters: Selçuk Başar; Ülkü Aker

Placement
- Final result: 12th, 37 points

Participation chronology

Turkey was represented at the Eurovision Song Contest 1984 with the song "Halay", composed by Selçuk Başar, with lyrics by Ülkü Aker, and performed by the band Beş Yıl Önce, On Yıl Sonra. The Turkish participating broadcaster, the Turkish Radio and Television Corporation (TRT), selected its entry through a national final.

== Before Eurovision ==
=== 8. Eurovision Şarkı Yarışması Türkiye Finali ===
The Turkish Radio and Television Corporation (TRT) held the national final on 25 February 1984 at its studios in Istanbul, hosted by Başak Doğru. Ten songs competed and the winner was determined by an expert jury.

According to the regulations the winner had to get at least 15 points. However at the end of the first voting no participant received the number of points required. Therefore a second round took place, with "Halay" performed by Beş Yıl Önce, On Yıl Sonra (which were ranked the third in the first voting) receiving the most points, and was thus determined as the winner. During the final, the group was accompanied by Arif Sağ, the renowned bağlama virtuoso.

Final – 25 February 1984
R/O	Artist	Song	Lyricist	Composer	Place
1	Coşkun Demir	"Sanki Dün Gibi"	Selmi Andak		—N/a
2	Beş Yıl Önce, On Yıl Sonra	"Halay"	Ülkü Aker	Selçuk Başar	1
3	Grup Ben Sen O	"Mutluluk Dansı"	Semra Öztan		—N/a
4	Sezen Aksu	"1945"	Aysel Gürel	Onno Tunç	—N/a
5	Ayşegül Aldinç	"Merhaba Ümit"	Cansın Erol	Selahattin İçli	—N/a
6	Neco	"Olmaz Olsun"	Ayşe Irmak Manioğlu	Selçuk Sun	2
7	Nükhet Ruacan	"Hayallerin Işığında"	Aysel Gürel	Arif Serdengeçti	—N/a
8	Neco	"O Şarkıyı Henüz Yazmadım"	Aysel Gürel	Selmi Andak	3
9	Kayahan	"Kaç Para?"	Yusuf Eradam		—N/a
10	Neco	"Tövbeliyim"	Ayşe Irmak Manioğlu	Selçuk Başar	—N/a

== At Eurovision ==
The contest was broadcast on TRT Televizyon (with commentary by Başak Doğru). The show was watched by 40 million viewers.

On the night of the contest, Beş Yıl Önce On Yıl Sonra performed 15th in the running order following Germany and preceding Finland. In the final they were not accompanied by Arif sağ. At the close of the voting Halay had received 37 points placing Turkey 12th. 8 participants had voted for Halay. This was the best result Turkey ever had in Eurovision up to 1984. The Turkish jury awarded its 12 points to Spain.

One of the promotional films, which was shown to all delegations, had ignited a controversy. Bülent Varol, head of the Turkish delegation, reported to the EBU that "Turkey is not an Arab country and has no relation to Arab music and cannot be represented with a fey". However, the promotional film wasn't changed despite the scandal.

=== Voting ===
Points awarded to Turkey
Score	Country
12 points	
10 points	Yugoslavia
8 points	
7 points	
6 points	Sweden; Switzerland
5 points	United Kingdom
4 points	Belgium
3 points	Finland
2 points	Ireland
1 point	Netherlands

Points awarded by Turkey
Score	Country
12 points	Spain
10 points	Ireland
8 points	Yugoslavia
7 points	Italy
6 points	Finland
5 points	Belgium
4 points	Luxembourg
3 points	Sweden
2 points	Denmark
1 point	United Kingdom
