= Erol Evgin =

Turkish singer, composer and actor

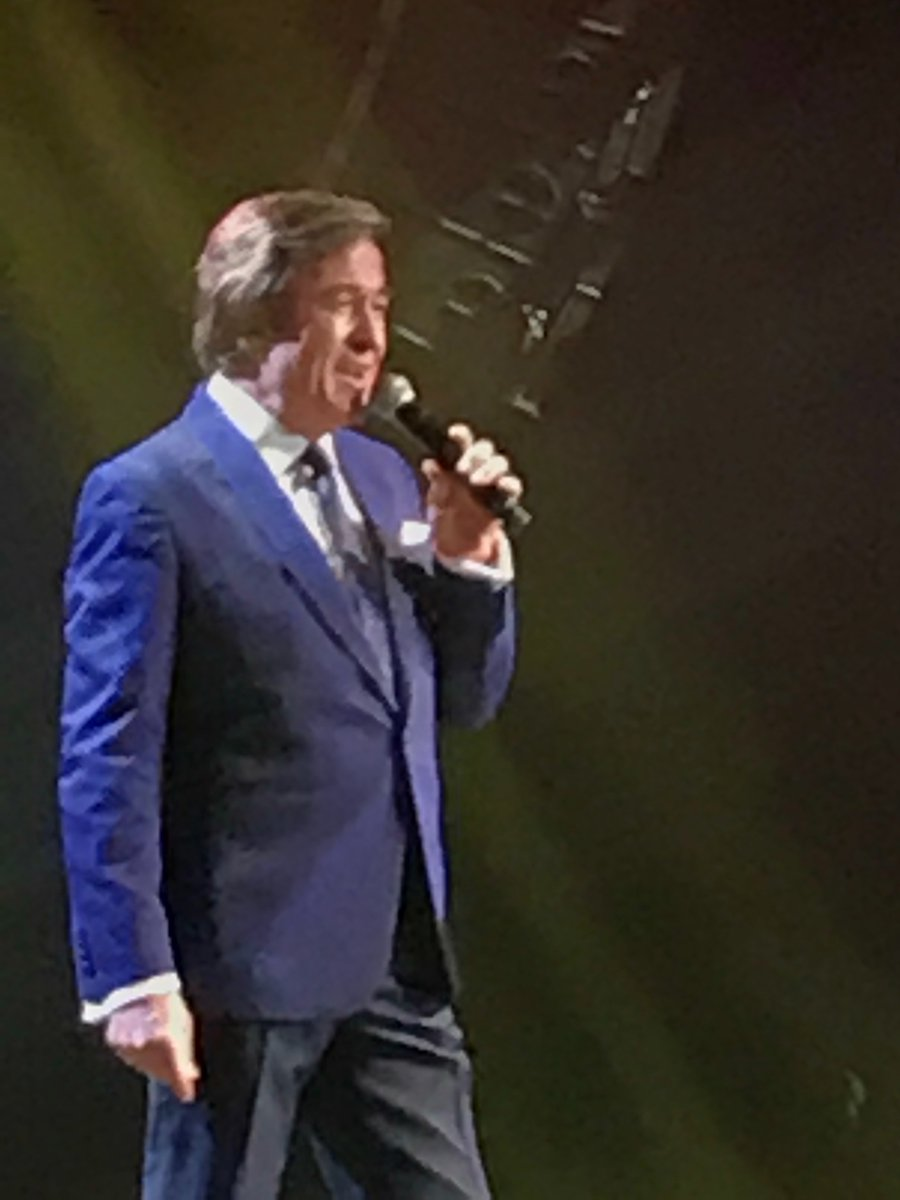
- Evgin performing at the Bostancı Performing Arts Center, April 2017

Background information
- Born: Mehmet Erol Evgin; 16 April 1947 (age 79); Istanbul, Turkey
- Genres: Turkish pop music, Ottoman classical music
- Occupation: Singer-songwriter
- Instrument: Vocals
- Years active: 1969–present
- Label: EMI / Kent
- Website: www.erolevgin.com

Mehmet Erol Evgin (born 16 April 1947) is a Turkish singer, composer and film actor.

== Biography ==
Erol Evgin was born in Istanbul, Turkey in 1947. He finished his high school education in Istanbul High School in 1965. He then studied architecture in Mimar Sinan Fine Arts University. In his musical career, he generally worked in collaboration with the composers Çiğdem Talu and Melih Kibar.

== Discography ==
=== Studio albums ===
- İşte Öyle Bir Şey (1977)
- Erol Evgin 79 (1979)
- Erol Evgin ve Renkli Dünyası (1981)
- Erol Evgin 84 (1984)
- Yeni Bir Gün Doğarken (1985)
- Lades (1986)
- Erol Evgin 88 (1988)
- Erol Evgin ile Yeniden (1991)
- Sen Unutulacak Kadın Mısın? (1997)
- İbadetim (2003)
- İşte Öyle Bir Şey: Melih Kibar – Çiğdem Talu Şarkıları (1976–1980) (2005)
- Tüm Bir Yaşam: Melih Kibar – Çiğdem Talu Şarkıları (1980–1983) (2006)
- Hep Böyle Kal – 40 Yıl 40 Şarkı (2009)
- Gözbebeğim Sen Çok Yaşa (2011)
- Altın Düetler (2016)
- Altın Düetler 2 (2019)
- Sevdiklerim (2021)

=== 45rpms and singles ===
- Sen – Eski Günler (1969)
- İstemesen de – Aşk Başlarken (1970)
- Bir Gün Biter – Söyleme (1970)
- Her Akşam – Unutma Sen (1970)
- Gurbet Türküsü – Deli Gönül (1972)
- Karacaoğlan der ki – Aç Yüzünü Göreyim (1972)
- Garip Gönlüm Olmuş Deli – Bulmak İsterim Seni (1973)
- Geli Geliver – Sen Varsın ya (1974)
- Bir Yıldız Doğdu Yüceden – Koş Gel Desen Kollarıma (1974)
- Gel de Yanma – Efkar (1975)
- Şoför Mehmet – Tanrım Bu Hasret Bitse (1976)
- İşte Öyle Bir Şey – Sevdan Olmasa (1976)
- Bir de Bana Sor – Etme Eyleme (1977)
- İçimdeki Fırtına – Yine de Güzeldir Yaşamak (1978)
- Aldım Başımı Gidiyorum – Kader Utansın (1979)
- Söyle Canım – Hep Böyle Kal (1980)
- Söyle Canım (2001)
- Yeni Yıla Sensiz Giriyorum – Sensiz Olmuyor (2010)

== Filmography ==
- Meryem ve Oğulları (1977)
- Renkli Dünya (1980)
- 1985 – Bir İlkbahar Sabahı
- 1988 – Hisseli Harikalar Kumpanyası

== See also ==
- Music of Turkey
- Turkish pop music
