= Nükhet Ruacan =

Turkish singer and educator (1951–2007)

- Born: 14 December 1951; Istanbul, Turkey
- Died: 6 May 2007 (aged 55); Istanbul, Turkey
- Genres: Jazz
- Occupation(s): Singer, educator
- Years active: 1974–2007

Nükhet Ruacan (14 December 1951 – 6 May 2007) was a Turkish singer and educator in musicology.

== Life ==
Nükhet Ruacan was born in Istanbul, Turkey on 14 December 1951. She studied graphic design in the State College of Applied Fine Arts Istanbul (Turkish: İstanbul Devlet Tatbiki Güzel Sanatlar Yüksek Okulu). She married twice, and gave birth to a daughter, Roksan.

Nükhet Ruacan died at the age of 55 on 6 May 2007 at a hospital in Istanbul, where she was treated on leukemia. She was laid to rest in Karacaahmet Cemetery in Istanbul.

== Career ==
Although educated as a graphic designer, she preferred to sing jazz. In 1974, her singing career started in Switzerland. Between 1974 and 1977, she performed in the orchestras of Emin Fındıkoğlu and Tommy Dodd in Switzerland, and in Norway. In 1977, she returned to Turkey, and continued as a performer in various nightclubsand music festivals. She went to New York in 1979, where she attended the New York Conservatory of Music for singing lessons. During this time, she released a record titled Ruacan.

After returning home in 1982, she gained fame as a jazz singer. She performed many times in the state-owned television channel Turkish Radio and Television Corporation (TRT), and produced an album. She appeared in concerts in China and the United States as a representative of Ministry of Culture. In 1984, she participated in the national selection for the Eurovision Song Contest. Later, she served in Istanbul Bilgi University for ten years as a musicology teacher. After 2005, she also trained people on music in Nazım Hikmet Center of Art.
