= Şefika Kutluer =

Turkish classical flutist

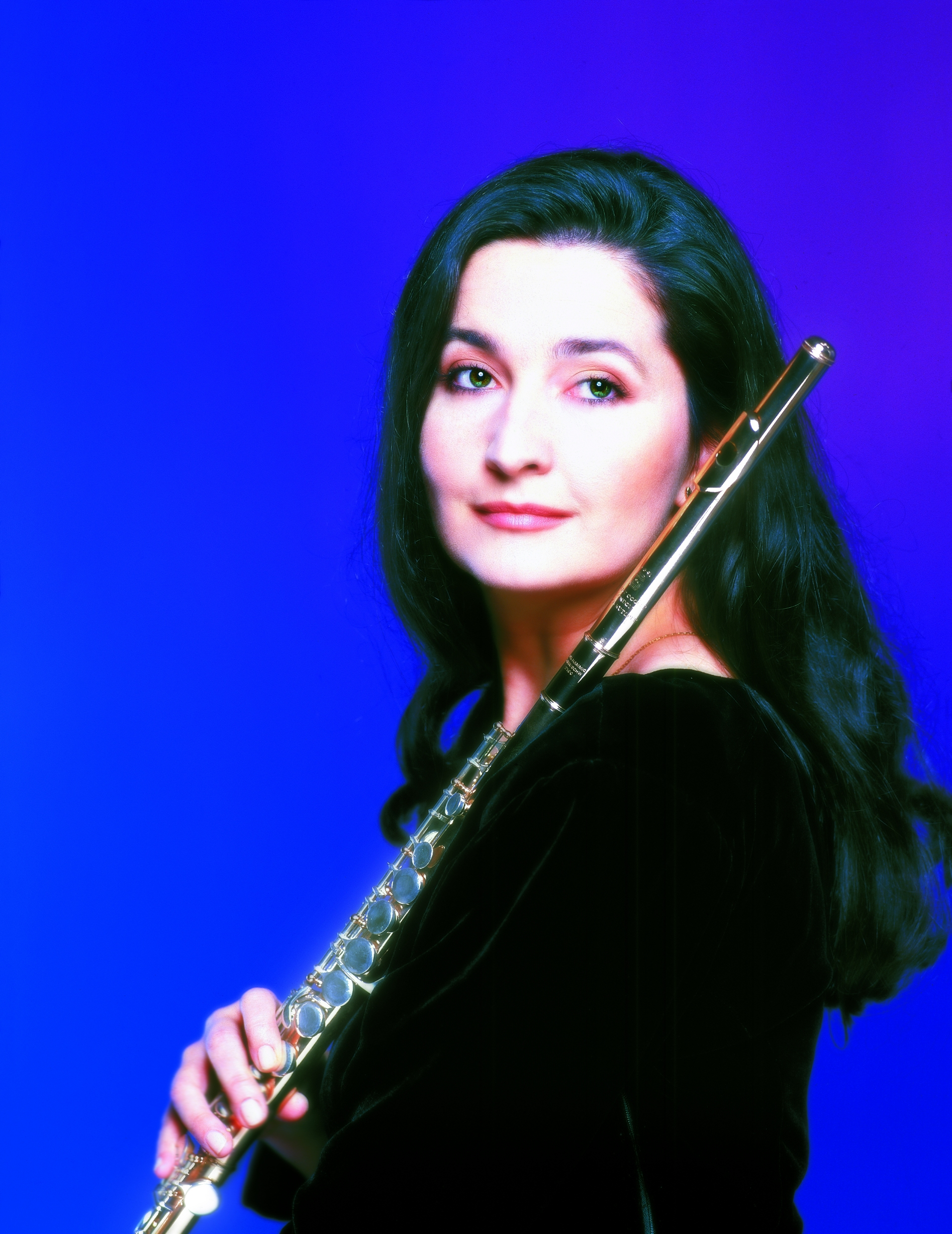
- Şefika Kutluer

Background information
- Born: May 5, 1961 (age 65); Ankara, Turkey
- Genres: Classical music
- Occupation: Flautist
- Instrument: Flute

Şefika Kutluer (born 5 May 1961) is a Turkish classical flautist.

She was born in Ankara, Turkey. While still in the primary school, she transferred to the primary school section of Ankara State Conservatory upon the suggestion of Ulvi Cemal Erkin, a notable musician and a friend of her father. In the conservatory, she specialized on flute, and graduated in 1979 with high honors. In 1983, she married businessman Ahmet Refik Kutluer.

== Music career ==
Sefika Kutluer has studied at Ankara State Conservatory for 10 years, advancing 4 grades, and graduated with honors and awards in 1979. She achieved her soloist career in Vienna and Rome.

She taught at the Ankara Conservatory for several years.

Receiving many international awards, she won the 1st prize in “International Flute Contest“ in Vienna.

After winning several international competitions and launching her truly international career as a soloist, she was awarded the presidential Medal in Turkey, in 1985, the highest honor that country bestows on an individual, and in 1998 she became a "State Artist".

She is known as the “Magic Flute” after the headline written by the New York Times’ critics.

Şefika Kutluer is the Flute Soloist at the Ministry of Culture and Tourism.

She received the “Golden Bravo Award”, as the “Best Classical Performer, in Russia at the Bolshoi Theatre. And she performed with the Bolshoi Theatre Symphony Orchestra on April the 25th, 2023.

She has performed several concerts, in innumerable countries in 5 continents, at many famous concert halls like; Carnegie Hall, Kennedy Center, Lincoln Center in the USA, Bolshoi Theater, Tchaikovsky Hall, St. Petersburg Phil. Hall in Russia, Suntory Hall in Japan, Rudolfinum in Prague, joined International Music Festivals and received very favorable reviews.

She participated in radio-television programs and held "Master Classes".

Also; Şefika Kutluer prepares and presents a program called "Music of Emotions" on TRT Radio 3 Classical Music channel, weekly.

In 2018 being invited by the government of Israel to represent Turkey, she joined the Mashav’s 30th International Women Leaders Conference of “Leading Women Making a Difference” in Israel. Gave a concert and delivered a speech together with women leaders (vice presidents, ministers, parliament and supreme council members) joining the conference from 45 different countries all over the world.

She has performed concerts at the Palais des Nations in Geneva on the occasion of the 60th Anniversary of the United Nations Organization, at the Palace of Spain in the presence of the King and the Queen and in Tokyo of Prince Mikasa.

Joined The 4th World Conference on Women, representing Turkey, in 1995 in Beijing, China and gave a concert.

Kutluer represented Turkey at the Asian Symphony Orchestra formed by artists from 40 different Asian Countries and performed the opening concert of The Conference on Dialogue of Asian Civilizations, in Beijing China in 2019, in front of President Xi Jinping and to an audience of 80 000. Then she continued her concert tour in China.

Ian Anderson composed a piece titled “Sefika’s Tango”, especially for her, and she made a concert tour with Jethro Tull playing this piece, as well.

Arif Melikov, Turgay Erdener, Jose Elizondo, Rene Giessen and Çetin Işıközlü have composed special music for her.

She made concerts with Claude Bolling dedicated to Jean Pierre Rampal.

She has started an international festival in Ankara, which continues every year during the same period. “The first 15 International Şefika Kutluer Festivals - East Meets West” (www.sefikakutluerfest.com ) were organized each year from 2010 to 2024.

The International Şefika Kutluer Festival was chosen as the 1st in the "Best Festival" category at the Ace of MICE Awards 2020, which is accepted as the Oscars of the ”meetings and events industry”.

Sefika Kutluer has released 17 albums, including recordings with the Berlin Philharmony and the British Royal Philharmonic orchestras.

Sony has awarded her Carmen Fantasy CD, with a "GOLDEN CD PRIZE".

Her "Bach Sonatas" CD has been chosen as one of the best CDs of the year by the reviewers of the American Record Guide.

She also received “GALLO GOLDEN CD COLLECTION” award from Gallo International, based in Switzerland, and her 17 CDs are published with this label.

Recently she has released a solo CD that includes her composition she has written for her beloved mother.

She is a Gallo International Management Artist.

Currently, Kutluer is the flute soloist of the İzmir State Symphony Orchestra.

== Albümleri ==
Yıl	Album	Record Place
	Wiener Musikseminar International Contest Prize Winners' Concert	Viyana
1994	Romantic Flute	Switzerland Radio Lugano
1994	Franz Krommer: Sinfonia Concertante	New Castle
1994	Şefika Kutluer
1996	Carmen Fantasy	Reformierte Kirche, Oberarth - Switzerland
1999	Mozart, Şefika Kutluer	In the Concert Hall of the Slovak Philharmonic Orchestra
2000	Fantasies	In the Concert Hall of the Slovak Philharmonic Orchestra
2001	Tango Goes Symphony	Bratislava
	J.S. Bach, Flute Sonatas	Bratislava
2002	J.S. Bach, Konçertolar	Berlin
	Coming Bach for Flute - Volume 1	Sony Studios
	Coming Bach for Flute - Volume 2	Sony Studios
2004	A. Vivaldi 6 Concerti, Op.10	Andreas Church, Berlin
2005	World of Lullabies (Dünya Ninnileri)	Angel Studios, Londra
2008	Mevlana Rumi	Modlitebna Českobratrské Church, Prag
2014	Latin Romance	Slovakia
2018	Şefika Kutluer Plays FADO	Portugal
2020	Şefika Kutluer Plays "SOLO"	Switzerland

== Awards ==
She was awarded the Presidential Medal of Turkey in 1985. On 22 August 1991, she was officially appointed as State Artist of Turkey. She has received the "Strategic Vision Award” from “Turkish Asian Center for Strategic Studies (TASAM)", in 2013.

She was also awarded abroad; like the "2000 Inter-Lyra Award" by Hungarian Foundation for Performing Arts . She is decorated abroad such as "Cavaliere dell’Ordine della Stella della Solidarieta’ Italiana" by the President of Italy, with "Austrian Gold Medal of Merit" by the President of Austria, the "Cultural Medal of the Republic of Kazakhstan".

In 2011, she has been appointed the "Goodwill Ambassador of Unicef".

State Golden Medal – by the President of Italy,

"Austrian Gold Medal of Merit" by the President of Austria, the “Cultural Medal” of the Republic of Kazakhstan and Slovak Republic’s special award - the “Golden Medal of Honour”.

She received the 2000 Inter-Lyra prize from the ‘Hungarian Foundation for Performing Arts’

She received the Ankara Metropolitan Municipality's "Adding Value to Ankara" award, and the “Strategic Vision Award” from “Turkish Asian Center for Strategic Studies (TASAM)”.

September, 28 2024 Şefika Kutluer received the award titled: “The Women of the Republic Who Left Their Mark in Performing Arts”

November, 7 2024 35th Ankara Film Festival presented Kutluer the “Art Treasure (Monument of Art)” Award

She received the “Golden Bravo Award”, as the “Best Classical Performer, in Russia at the Bolshoi Theatre. And she performed with the Bolshoi Theatre Symphony Orchestra on April the 25th, 2023.
