= Istanbul Aydın University =

Private university in İstanbul, Turkey

Coordinates: 40°59′30″N 28°47′52″E

- İstanbul Aydın Üniversitesi
- Former name: Anadolu Bil (2003–2007)
- Motto: Aydınlık bir geleceğe (Turkish)
- Motto in English: Towards A Bright Future
- Type: Private
- Established: 2003
- President: Dr. Mustafa Aydın
- Rector: Prof. Dr. Ibrahim Hakkı Aydin
- Academic staff: 3000
- Students: 50,000
- Location: Istanbul, Turkey
- Campus: Suburban
- Language: English and Turkish
- Colors: Blue and White
- Website: www.aydin.edu.tr

University rankings

Regional – Overall
- QS Emerging Europe and Central Asia: 251-300 (2022)

Istanbul Aydın University (Turkish: İstanbul Aydın Üniversitesi) is a private university founded on 18 May 2007, in Istanbul, Turkey by extension of its predecessor, the vocational college of Anadolu BIL that existed since 26 September 2003.

The university is a technology center built on an area of 175,000 m^{2} (1,880,000 sq ft). Current covered space of 3,000 m^{2} (32,000 sq ft) will expand to 30,000 m^{2} (320,000 sq ft) when the construction of the technopark is completed.

== History ==
In 1995, the Anadolu Education and Culture Foundation applied to the Council of Higher Education (YÖK) to establish a vocational school with the aim of addressing the shortage of qualified personnel in Turkey. As a result, with the General Assembly decision No. 106 issued on 26 September 2003, a vocational school was established that was directly affiliated with the Council of Higher Education—the first institution of its kind in the country. The newly established institution was named Anadolu BİL Vocational School (Anadolu BİL Meslek Yüksekokulu). While the vocational school continued its activities after admitting its first students in the 2004–2005 academic year, the foundation simultaneously pursued a project to establish a foundation university. This effort resulted in the establishment of Istanbul Aydın University. The university was founded under Law No. 5656 (Additional Article 73), published in the Official Gazette on 18 May 2007 (No. 26526). Following the creation of the university, Anadolu BİL Vocational School became part of its institutional structure.

== Faculties ==
The university consists of ten faculties.

- Faculty of Art and Sciences
- Faculty of Communications
- Faculty of Dentistry
- Faculty of Economics and Administrative Sciences
- Faculty of Education
- Faculty of Engineering - Architecture
- Faculty of Fine Arts
- Faculty of Law
- Faculty of Medicine
