= Vecihe Daryal =

- Birth name: Vecihe
- Born: 17 April 1908; Beylerbeyi, Üsküdar, Istanbul, Ottoman Empire
- Died: 12 November 1970 (aged 62); Istanbul, Turkey
- Genres: Ottoman music
- Occupation: Musician
- Instrument: Qanun
- Years active: 1926 –-1953

Vecihe Daryal (17 April 1908 – 12 November 1970) was a Turkish classical qanun player.

== Early life ==
Vecihe was born in Beylerbeyi neighborhood of Üsküdar, Istanbul, then Ottoman Empire, on 17 April 1908. Her father, Abdülmecid, was a religious scholar.

At age seven, she started to take private music lessons, particularly in playing the qanun. Two years later, she was admitted to the first official music school "Dârülelhan" (1917-1927), later Istanbul Municipal Conservatory. She then studied music at Teachers College for Girls, where she was tutored by Edgar Manas in piano, Cemal Reşit Rey in Harmony and many other notable musicians also in solfège and western Music. She graduated on 29 December 1926.

== Career ==
As a student, she started to perform the qanun at Radio Istanbul. In 1928, she entered Radio Istanbul as a regular staff artis. After ten years, she transferred to Radia ANkara as a staff member to play the qanun, as a music teacher and a member of the musical repertoire board. She served there from 1938 until 1953. In 1953, she returned to Istanbul to play the qanun at Radio Istanbul again and Istanbul Municipal Conservatory. She was appointed to the executive board at the conservatory.

== Death and legacy ==
Vecihe Daryal died at the age of 62 in Istanbul on 12 November 1970. She was interred at Merkezefendi Cemetery.

A collection of instrumental and lyrical works collected by Vecihe Daryal is in the Turkish Radio and Television Corporation archive. At a Turkish classical music concert at Cemal Reşit Rey Concert Hall in Istanbulin February 2000, which was held to honor Turkish women musicians featured also the only composition of Vecihe Daryal. Celebrating the International Women's Day, Istanbul Technical University Turkish Music State Conservatory held a seminar in her honor on 8 March 2011.
