= Ali Rıza Binboğa =

Turkish singer

- Born: 26 February 1950 (age 76); Sarız, Kayseri, Turkey
- Genres: Anatolian rock, türkü
- Occupations: Singer-songwriter, composer
- Years active: 1971–present

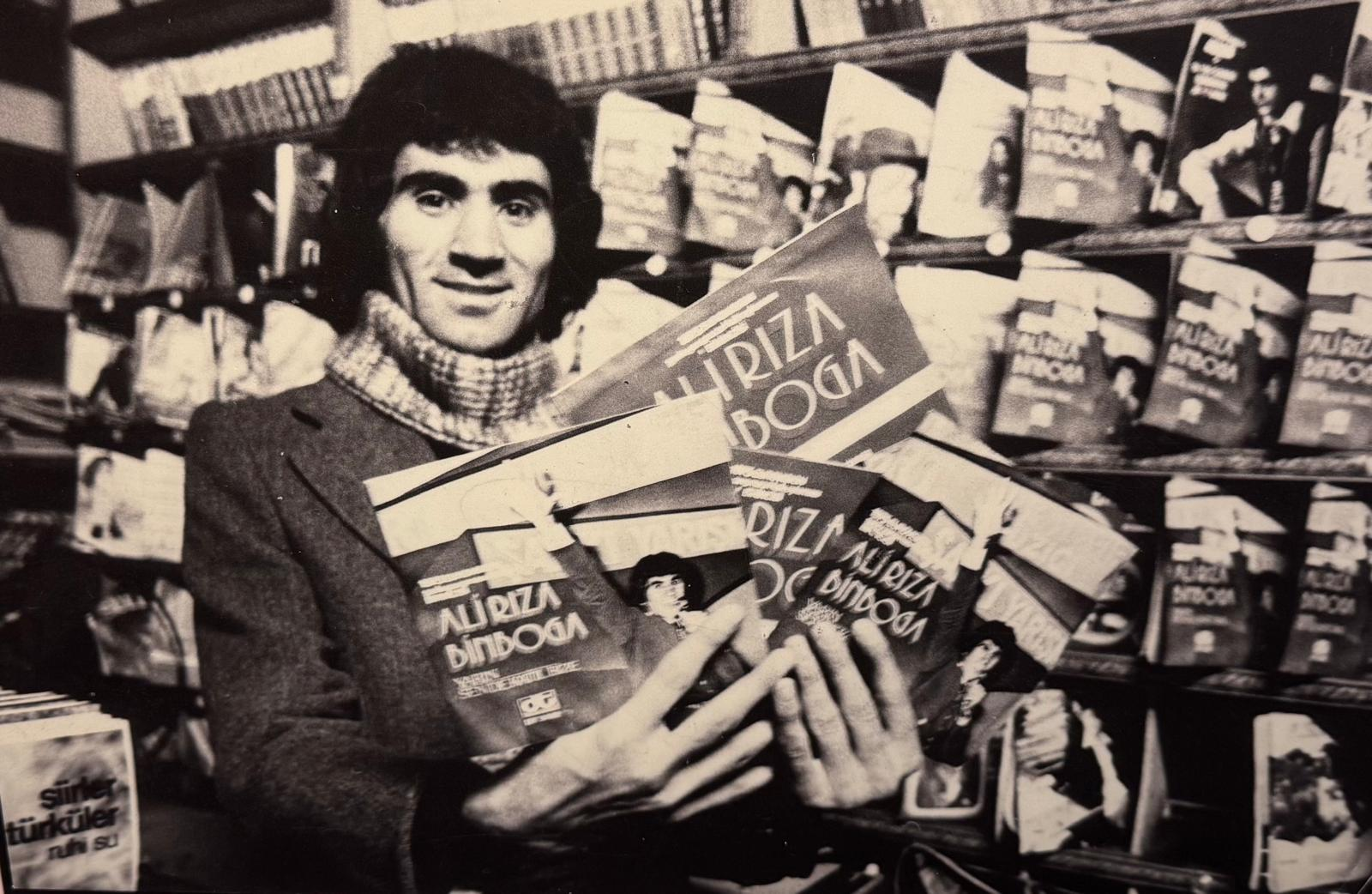
Ali Rıza Binboga Plak İmza Günü Ankara

Ali Rıza Binboğa (born 26 February 1950) is a Turkish singer.

== Life ==
He was born in 1950 in the small village of Ördekli in Sarız district of Kayseri Province. He first met with music in 1964 when he was selected as one of the sixteen students who attended a music seminar organized in Ankara. After completing his secondary education in Kayseri, he attended Istanbul Technical University and in 1973, graduated as an electronics engineer. Before 1975, he served in Turkish PTT. He is married and a father of three children.

== Career ==
His first public appearance as a singer was in Turkish under contest for Eurovision Song Contest 1975. His entry was named Yarınlar Bizim ("Tomorrows are ours") a dynamic melody with lyrics which were interpreted to be politic messages. The melody caused excitement and received the highest points in people's jury. But the points from the professional jury were low and Binboğa lost his chance to participate in Eurovision contest.

In the following years, Ali Rıza Binboğa produced other records. In 1978, he played in a drama of Turkish Radio and Television Corporation named İlk Öğretmen ("Primary school teacher"). His composition for this drama was another big success.

In 1987, he became a member of MESAM (Musical Work Owner's Society of Turkey). In 1999, he was elected as a member of the administrative board up to 2011.

== Discography ==
| Type | Name | Year |
|---|---|---|
45 rpm
| 45 rpm | Mehriban-N'oldun | 1971 |
| 45 rpm | Yarınlar bizim-Sen de katıl bize | 1975 |
| 45 rpm | Yaralı deli gönül-Kem gözlerden | 1975 |
| 45 rpm | Dost olayı-Ayak oyunları | 1975 |
| 45 rpm | Sevgilimin derdi-Birlik için el ele | 1975 |
| 45 rpm | İlk Öğretmen-Baharı Beklerim | 1978 |
| 45 rpm | Türkiye'nin Kızları-Alın beni de beraber | 1982 |
LP
| LP | Ve sen ağlarken | 1976 |
| LP | Yaramaz Çocuk | 1979 |
| LP | Göçmen Kuşlar | 1985 |
| LP | Paylaşmak ne güzel | 1989 |
| LP | Kardeşiz Biz | 1996 |
| LP | Eski 45 likler | 2000 |
