= Behiye Aksoy =

Turkish female singer

Background information
- Born: Behiye Tetiker; 19 September 1933; Istanbul, Turkey
- Died: 31 May 2015 (aged 81) Istanbul, Turkey
- Genres: Turkish classical music
- Occupation: Singer
- Years active: 1948–2013

Behiye Aksoy (born Behiye Tetiker; 19 September 1933 – 31 May 2015) was a Turkish female singer of Turkish classical music genre.

== Early years ==
She was born in Istanbul on 19 September 1933. Her maiden surname was Tetiker. After primary school in İstanbul, her family moved to Ankara, where she finished junior high school.

== Music career ==
At the age of 15, she applied to audition with Ankara Radio. She was among the five successful candidates out of 200. She was one of the Turkish music singers of Ankara Radio for nine years. In 1958, for the first time she got on stage in Ankara. Three years later, she moved to İstanbul and became one of the two star performers of the "Maksim Gazino", the most famous night club of Turkey at the time. The other star performer was Zeki Müren.

She also released records, about 100 45-rpm and 20 LPs. She played in four films. She received a platinum diadem for her success from her record company.

== Private life ==
She married three times. The first was with Halil Aksoy, a musician between 1952 and 1963. Halil Aksoy was the father of her only son Ahmet Kazım. Although they were divorced, she kept the surname Aksoy. Her two other marriages were short-lived. Between 1973 and 1974, she married Berker İnanoğlu, a film producer. Her third marriage was with Fahrettin Aslan, the owner of the Maksim night club, which also ended in the same year.

She died in İstanbul on 31 May 2015. She was buried in Zincirlikuyu Cemetery.

== Albums ==
Her albums are the following: Some of these albums are collections of her records.

1. 1968: Dumanlı Meyhaneler
2. 1970: Behiye Aksoy
3. 1971: Behiye Aksoy Atlas
4. 1971: Kıskanırım
5. 1971: Şençalar LPM
6. 1972: 1972 Yılının 12 Altın Şarkısı
7. 1972: Behiye Aksoy-3
8. 1974: Unutulumayan Şarkılar Konseri
9. 1955: Behiye Aksoy Atlas
10. 1976: Anılarla Sadettin Kaynak
11. 1976: Behiye Aksoy
12. 1978: Leylakların Hayali
13. 1979: Unutulmayanlar
14. 1982: Çağrı
15. 1982: Gitme Sana Muhtacım
16. 1984: Mavi Boncuk
17. 1986: Gözlerin
18. 1987: Ah Bu Gece
19. 1996: Kapı Her Çalındıkça
20. 1996: Nankör
21. 2006: Hatıralar
22. 2008: En İyileriyle Behiye Aksoy
23. 2013: Aldırma Gönül
24. 2013: Sizin İçin Seçtiklerimiz.
25. 2013: Son Konser

== Filmography ==
The films she took part are the following;

- Taş Plaktan Bugüne
- Deli Deli Tepeli
- Falcı
- Kederli Günlerim
