= Egemen =

Egemen Necmi Kocaoglu (Kyrgyz: Egement, English: Independence) was an organization in Kyrgyzstan. In 1998, its members allegedly threatened violent acts in retaliation for Kyrgyz parliament deputy Dooronbek Sadyrbayev's proposal to grant the Russian language official status in Kyrgyzstan.
