= Çiğdem Balım Harding =

Çiğdem Balım is Senior Lecturer Emerita at the Center for the Study of the Middle East at Indiana University. Balım was the Associate Director of the Center. She also acted as the director of graduate studies and as the director of language instruction in the Department of Near Eastern Languages and Cultures.

Balım received her B.A. at Hacettepe University in 1974 and her Ph.D. at the University of Washington in 1979.

== Publications ==
- The Balance of Truth: Essays in Honour of Geoffrey Lewis. (Co-editor and contributor) İstanbul: İSİS, 2000. 370p.
- World Bibliographical Series: Turkey. Oxford: ABC-Clio Press, 1999. 407p. (Collator, Editor and contributor)
- Turkey: Political, Economic and Social Challenges for the 1990s. (Co-editor and contributor) Leiden: Brill, 1995. 307p.
- Meskhetian Turks: An Introduction to their History, Culture, and U.S. Resettlement Experience. Co-author. Washington D.C. CAL Publications, October 2006.
- Bağımsızlıklarının 20. yılında Orta Asya Cumhuriyetleri ve Türk Dilli Halkları ve Türkiye ile ilişkiler [Central Asian Republics on the 20th anniversary of their independence, their Turkic-languages speaking peoples, and relations with Turkey], co-editor with A. Aydıngün. Ankara : Atatürk Kültür Kurumu, 2012.
- Bağımsızlıklarının 20. yılında Azerbaycan, Gürcistan ve Ukrayna’da Türk Dilli Halklar ve Türkiye ile ilişkiler [Azerbaijan, Georgia and Ukraine and their Turkic-languages speaking peoples on the 20 anniversary of their independence, and relations with Turkey], co-editor with İ. Aydıngün. Ankara: Atatürk Kültür Kurumu, 2012.
