= Nükhet Duru =

Turkish singer

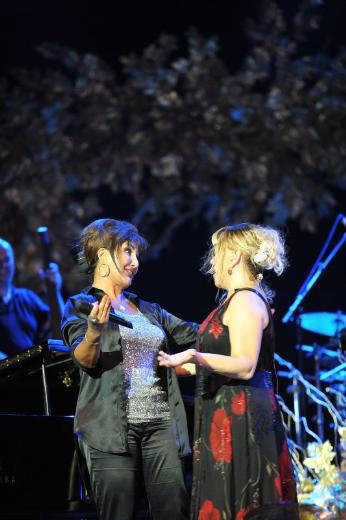
- Nükhet Duru (left) and Sezen Aksu in a concert in Cemil Topuzlu Open-Air Theatre, 2012

Background information
- Born: 19 May 1954 (age 72); Istanbul, Turkey
- Genres: Jazz; pop; Turkish classical; electronic
- Occupations: Singer; actress; TV presenter
- Years active: 1971–present
- Spouse(s): Dikran Masis (m. 1987; div. 1991) Özalp Birol (m. 1995; div. 1999)
- Website: nukhetduru.com.tr

Nükhet Duru (born 19 May 1954) is a Turkish singer.

== Career ==
She started singing at Florya Deniz Club in Istanbul in 1971. She released her first 45 album Aklımda Sen Fikrimde Sen – Karadır Kaşların in 1974. It was followed by many singles like Beni Benimle Bırak – Cambaz- Harp ve Sulh-Gerisi Vız Gelir (1975), with which she won a Golden Plate. Her first LP album Bir Nefes Gibi was released in 1977. In that same year, Duru was awarded the "Most Successful Female Singer of the Year". In 1978, she participated in a song contest with Modern Folk Trio, which was held in Seoul, and won first place. In the 1980s, she began singing Turkish Traditional music. Besides as a pop and Turkish traditional music singer, Duru has performed on TV programs, musicals, films and TV dramas. She has received many awards.

Her 1978 song Ben Sana Vurgunum was heavily sampled by The Weeknd in his song "Often" from his 2015 album, "Beauty Behind the Madness".

Duru released a new studio album, Hikayesi Var, in 2020. In the album she voiced duets with different artists, including Sıla, Kenan Doğulu, Mabel Matiz, Evrencan Gündüz, Funda Arar, Kalben, Zeynep Bastık, Ceylan Ertem, Sena Şener, Rubato and Ata Demirer.

On 14 February 2020, it was announced that director Mu Tunc is working on a new documentary film based on Duru's career.

== Discography ==
=== 45rpms, EPs and singles ===
- Aklımda Sen Fikrimde Sen - Karadır Kaşların (1975)
- Beni Benimle Bırak - Gerisi Vız Gelir (1976)
- Her Şey Yolunda Şimdi - İki Damla Gözyaşı (1976)
- Canım Yandı - Haydi Uzatma Arkadaş (1977)
- Cambaz - Haydi Hayat (1977)
- Harp ve Sulh - Bir İnsan Doğdu (1977)
- Anılar - Güneş (1978)
- Dostluğa Davet - Takalar (1978) (with Modern Folk Üçlüsü)
- Portofino - Yıldızlar (1979)
- Ne Oldu Bize - Al Gönlümü Diyar Diyar Sürükle (1983)
- Remix-1 (1998)
- Remix-2 (1998)
- Nükhet Duru '99 (1999)
- Durup Dururken (2008)
- İlk 2 (2010)
- Mavi Düşler (2018)
- Kalbim Ege'de Kaldı (2020)
- Kapıldım Gitti (2021)
- Uzunlar (2021)
- Değmesin Ellerimiz (2022)
- Olasılık (2023) (with Devrim Ekiz)
- Aklım Seferde (2025)

=== Studio albums ===
- Bir Nefes Gibi (1976)
- Melankoli (1978)
- Sevgili Çocuklar (1979)
- Nükhet Duru IV (1979)
- Nükhet Duru 1981 (1981)
- Aşıksam Ne Farkeder? (1982)
- Her Şey Yeni (1984)
- Sevda (1985)
- Nadide (1986)
- Çek Halatı Gönlüm (1987)
- Benim Yolum (1989)
- Aç Gözünü Adamım (1991)
- Aman Tanrım! (1992)
- Nükhet Duru (1994)
- Gümüş (1996)
- Mühür (1997)
- Cahide - Bu Bir Efsane (1998)
- Bana Rağmen (2001)
- Muhteşem İkili (2004) (with Cenk Eren)
- ...Gece Saat On İki (2006)
- Tam Zamanında (2012)
- Aşkın N Hali (2015)
- Hikayesi Var (2020)

=== Compilation and live albums ===
- En Sevilen Şarkılarıyla Nükhet Duru (1979)
- Benim Şarkılarım (1988)
- Nükhet Duru Klasikleri (1993)
- Nükhet Duru'dan Bir Nefes Gibi'ler (1998)
- Sevgiyle Elele (2006) (with Surp Vartanants Choir, in Cenk Taşkan's name)
- En İyileriyle Nükhet Duru 1981-1982 (2008)
- Nükhet Duru Sahnede (2014)

== Filmography ==
=== TV series ===
- 1993: Umut Taksi
- 2000: Dadı
- 2000: Şemsi Paşa Pasajı
- 2001: Baş Belası
- 2001: Yeni Hayat
- 2002: Bayanlar Baylar
- 2002: Deliboran Destanı
- 2004: Avrupa Yakası
- 2004: Çemberimde Gül Oya
- 2005: Eylül
- 2015: Arka Sokaklar
- 2016: Şahane Damat
- 2020: Menajerimi Ara
- 2022: Aslında Özgürsün
- 2023: Tetikçinin Oğlu

=== Film ===
- 1971: Şerefimle Yaşarım
- 1973: Dağdan İnme
- 1973: Yemin
- 1975: Ayıkla Beni Hüsnü
- 1976: Kader Bağlayınca
- 1982: Düşkünüm Sana
- 2005: Keloğlan Kara Prens'e Karşı
- 2015: Düğün Dernek 2: Sünnet

=== Television programs ===
- 1995: Bir Nükhet Duru Gecesi
- 1996: Sarışının Adı Esmerin Tadı (With Sibel Can)
- 2007: Duru Muhabbetler
- 2009: Akşama Doğru Nükhet Duru
