= Sibel Egemen =

Turkish singer (born 1958)

- Born: 13 May 1958 (age 68); Ankara, Turkey
- Genres: Pop, folk, jazz
- Occupation: Singer-songwriter
- Label: Seyhan Müzik

Sibel Egemen (born 13 May 1958) is a Turkish singer.

== Biography ==
She is the granddaughter of Turkish composer Muzaffer İlkar. Egemen got training as a child in ballet, violin and piano. She began her professional musical career in 1973 as member of Cici Kızlar. She left the group due to the difficulty she felt in running education and music together. After her break up, Bilgen Bengü joined them in 1975 and became one of the most popular singers in Turkey with a song called Hayret. With 1983's Dünyam Değişti, she branched off into folk music. After the last album, she left music and worked as an expert in Public Relations at Yurtbank between 1995 and 2005. She then moved to Izmir and has been an academician at Public Relations and Advertising in Communication Faculty of Ege University since 2005.

== Discography ==
=== Albums ===
- 1977 Sibel Egemen
- 1981 Sibel
- 1983 Dunyam Degisti
- 1988 Mini Minicik Bir Kase
- 1992 Dün ve Bugün... Sevgiyle

=== 45's ===
- 1976 Simdi Ne Yapsam – Senin Vicdanın Yok Mu
- 1976 Yenildim Sana – Hayrola
- 1977 Hayret – Dile Benden Ne Dilersen
- 1977 Nerede – Sahte Gozyaslari

== Filmography ==
Title	Year	Role
Eşek Şakası	1980	
Beni Bırakma	1986	Songül
Geçmiş Zaman Olur ki	2006	
