= Ayşegül Aldinç =

Turkish singer and actress (born 1957)

- Born: 28 September 1957 (age 68); Istanbul, Turkey
- Genres: Pop, schlager
- Occupation: Singer
- Years active: 1978–present
- Labels: EMI, 1 Numara, Kent, Şan, Tempa&Foneks, Kiss, DMC

Ayşegül Aldinç (Turkish pronunciation: [aːjʃeˈɟyl alˈdintʃ]; born 28 September 1957) is a Turkish singer and actress.

== Life and career ==
She is the daughter of journalist and sports writer Orhan Aldinç and painting teacher Süheyla Aldinç. Growing in Cihangir, Due to the works of her mother, she completed her secondary education at the schools in Taksim, Kocamustafapaşa and Feriköy districts. She finished her high school at the Sultanahmet Art School. She finished her studies at Tatbiki Fine Arts Academy Ceramic Department (now called Marmara University Faculty of Fine Arts Ceramics Department). Shortly after her graduation, she worked as an artist at Anafartalar Middle School, and then as a music teacher at Akaretler Middle School in Istanbul.

Aldinç later went to Ankara and participated in the Eurovision's primary competitions on TRT at that time and qualified to represent Turkey. She performed with the Modern Folk Trio at the Eurovision Song Contest 1981 in Dublin. Their song, "Dönme Dolap" (Ferris wheel), earned the eighteenth place. Aldinç, who worked as a designer for six years in Yıldız Porcelain Factory, started to perform in the casinos in 1985. Her first solo album was released in 1988 with the support of Aysel Gürel, Timur Selçuk and Barış Manço. With the song "Kara Sevda" she became famous in Turkey's music market. Since then, she has released six studio albums. She has also acted in many theatrical productions (her debut being in the 1987 movie Katırcılar), and also in many Turkish miniseries and soap operas (three for TRT, three for ATV Turkey, two for Star TV, and one for Kanal D). In Turkey, she is equally recognized for her singing and acting roles.

=== Personal life ===
In 1979, she married Mehmet Teoman, and got divorced after a few months.

== Discography ==
=== 45rpms and Singles ===
- "Hastane – Yorgun ve Mutlu" (1978) (ft. Mehmet Teoman)
- "Dönme Dolap – Miras" (1981) (ft. Modern Folk Üçlüsü & Coşkun Demir)
- "O Kız" (2010)
- "Li Lal Lal La La" (2011)
- "Bir Tek Gördüğüm" (2015)

=== Albums ===
- ...Ve Ayşegül Aldinç (1988)
- Benden Söylemesi (1991)
- Alev Alev (1993)
- Söze Ne Hacet (1996)
- Nefes (2000)
- Sek'iz (2016)

== Filmography ==
=== Movies ===
- Katırcılar (1987, Dir: Şerif Gören)
- Yağmur Kaçakları (1987, Dir: Yavuz Özkan)
- Kara Sevda (1989, Dir: Samim Değer)
- Yeşil Bir Dünya (1990, Dir: Faruk Turgut)
- Ağrı’ya Dönüş (1993, Dir: Tunca Yönder)
- Gerilla (1994, Dir: Osman Sınav)
- Deniz Bekliyordu (1996, Dir: Suna Kural Aytuna)
- Kahpe Bizans (2000, Dir: Gani Müjde – Tolgay Ziyal)
- Güle Güle (2000, Dir: Zeki Ökten)
- Hayal Kurma Oyunları (2000, Dir: Yavuz Özkan)

=== TV series ===
- Acımak (1985, TRT, Dir: Orhan Aksoy)
- Taşların Sırrı (1992, Star TV, Dir: Yusuf Kurçenli)
- Yorgun Savaşçı (1993, Dir: Tunca Yönder)
- Aziz Ahmet (1994, ATV, Dir: Orhan Oğuz)
- Aşk ve Gurur (2002, Star TV, Dir: Aydın Bulut)
- Efsane (2002, Star TV, Dir: Tamer İpek)
- Ablam Böyle İstedi (2003, TRT, Dir: Nurtaç Erimer)
- Sultan Makamı (2003, Kanal D, Dir: Aydın Bulut)
- Son Yaprak (2004, TRT, Dir: Alparsan Bozkurt)
- Misi (2005, ATV, Dir: Taner Akvardar)
- Pis Yedili (2011, Show TV, Dir: Haluk Bener)

Awards and achievements
Preceded by Ajda Pekkan with "Pet'r Oil"	Turkey in the Eurovision Song Contest; 1981	Succeeded by Neco with "Hani?"
