= Semiha Yankı =

Turkish singer, presenter and actress

- Born: 15 January 1958 (age 68); Istanbul, Turkey
- Genres: Pop
- Occupations: Singer, presenter
- Instrument: Vocals
- Years active: 1975–present

Semiha Yankı (born 15 January 1958) is a Turkish pop music singer, presenter and film actress, best known for representing Turkey for the first time at the Eurovision Song Contest 1975 with the song Seninle Bir Dakika.

== Discography ==
- Büyük Aşkımız (Our Great Love)
- Adını Yollara Yazdım (Disco-1989)
- Ben Sana Mecburum (I'm compelled to you)
- Sevgi Üstüne (About Love)
- Hayırlı Olsun (Good luck with it)
- Ayrılanlar İçin
- Seni Seviyorum (I love you) (Ağdaş Müzik-2004)

== Filmography ==
- Güneş Doğmasın (1961)
- Hammal (1976)

Achievements
Preceded by N/A	Turkey in the Eurovision Song Contest; 1975	Succeeded by Nilüfer & Nazar with "Sevince"
