= Füsun Önal =

Turkish singer, actress, and writer

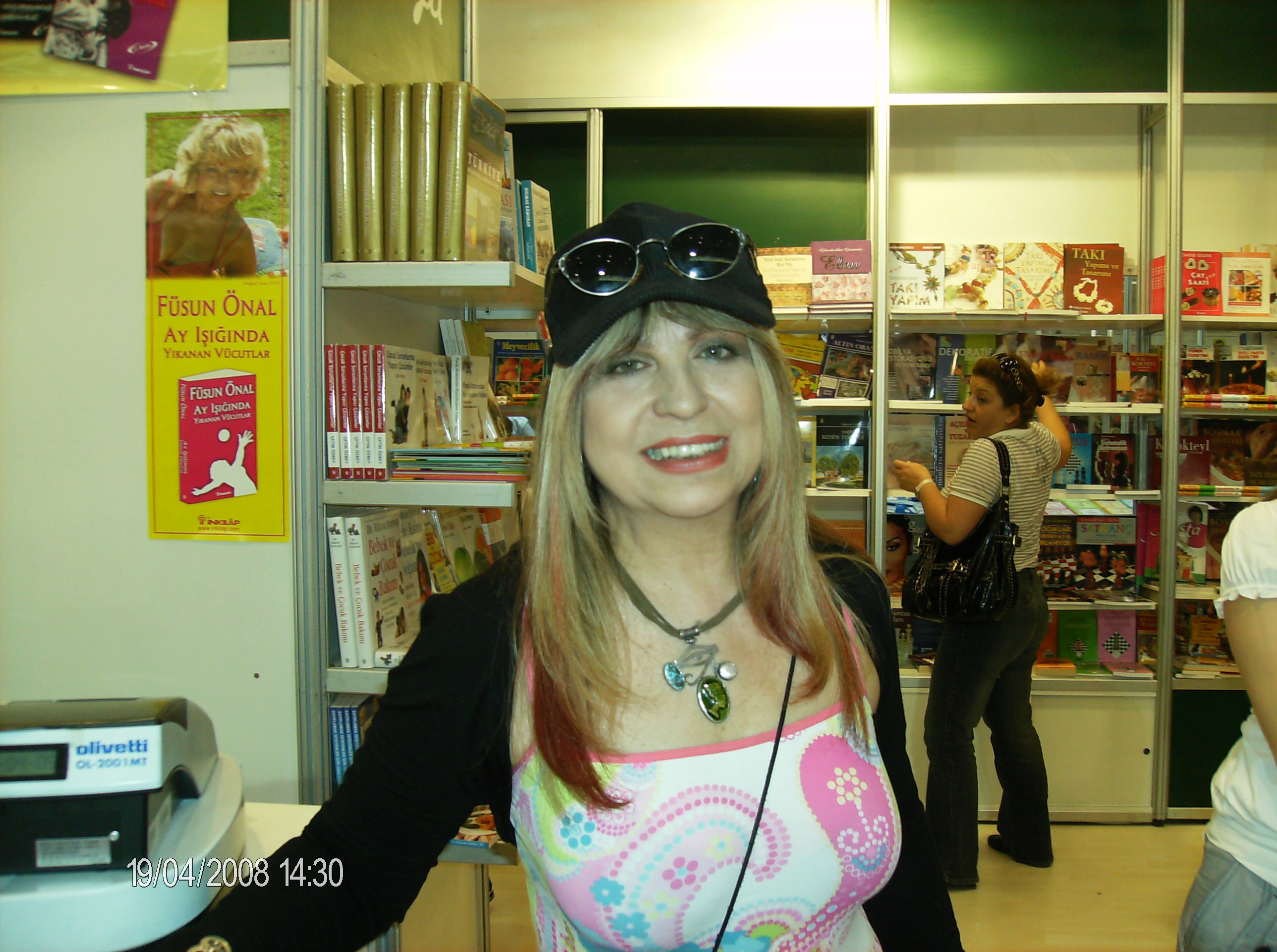
- Önal in 2008
- Born: Nuriye Füsun Önal; 11 March 1947 (age 79); Kadıköy,Istanbul, Turkey
- Education: TED Ankara College; Ankara University
- Occupations: Singer; actress; writer; photographer
- Years active: 1966–present
- Spouse(s): Attila Özdemiroğlu (m. 1975; div. 1977) Tunç Başaran (m. 1980; div. 1983)
- Parent(s): Mennan Önal (father); Fikret Önal (mother)

Nuriye Füsun Önal (born 11 March 1947) is a Turkish pop singer, theatre actress, and writer.

== Biography ==
Önal's father was a soldier in the Turkish army; her mother was a housewife. Füsun grew up in Ankara. During her childhood, she played the mandolin and accordion. She also had private piano lessons, and studied classical music.

Önal graduated from the TED Ankara College and studied English philology at Ankara University. During her college years, she sang with the Erol Pekcan Jazz Orchestra. Subsequently, she moved to Istanbul and sang pop music in İstanbul's well-known venues. Önal performed at youth concerts, and produced radio and television programs. Additionally, Füsun performed in Australia, England, Italy, Switzerland, Kazakhstan, and Kyrgyzstan; went on 16 tours in Turkey; and acted in numerous voice roles.

Önal was the host of the popular television show Newlywed Game-Evcilik Oyunu for about 450 broadcasts on Turkish TV channel Show TV. She also acted in movies, mainly portraying a singer while performing her own songs. She has played the lead in theatre performances and musicals all over Turkey. Önal has recorded music for CBS, Odeon Records, Sony Records, Discotur, Melody, and Ronnex Records, recording 12 albums to date. She has earned golden records four times: for her songs Senden Başka, Oh Olsun, and Ah Nerede, and her album Alo Ben Füsun. During the 2000s, she released a number of compilation CD's.

Önal is also a photographer, staging 14 personal photograph exhibitions from 1990 to 2000.

In 1990, Önal began a new career as an author under the patronage of Turkish writer Aziz Nesin. She subsequently signed a contract with Turkish publisher İnkılap Kitapevi. Thus far, Önal has written 20 books, including: Aslında Hüzündü Hepsinin Yaşadığı, Utanmaz Kitap, Silikon Hayatlar, Bay G, Matrak Sultan, Ruhsar Hanım, Sevişmenin Rengi, Gezikolik, Hayatımdan Sayfalar-Şöhretistan, and Benim Adım Aşk.

Currently, Önal performs at the Theatre Kedi, portraying Countess Rosina Almaviva in The Marriage of Figaro.

== Discography ==
LP

- Alo Ben Füsun (1975)
- Birtanem...Beni Hatırlar mısın (1977)
- Yeni Bir Gün Başlıyor (1981) (With Ahmet Tuğsuz)
- Saat 12...Daha Sabaha Çok Var (1982)
- Müzik Benim Dünyam (1985)

CD

- Kuşadası Altın Güvercin Yarışma Şarkıları (1987)
- Nasıl Yani (Ali) (Şahin Özer-1992)
- Ah Nerede (Sony/Odeon)
- Bak Bir Varmış Bir Yokmuş-1 (mix) (Odeon)
- Bak Bir Varmış Bir Yokmuş-2 (mix) (Odeon)
- Bak Bir Varmış Bir Yokmuş-3 (mix) (Odeon)
- Bak Bir Varmış Bir Yokmuş-4 (mix) (Odeon)
- Söz:Çiğdem Talu (karma) (Ossi Müzik)
- Müzik: Selmi Andak-1 (mix) (Ossi Müzik)
- Müzik: Selmi Andak-2 (mix) (Ossi Müzik)
- Bir Zamanlar-1 (mix) (Ossi Müzik)
- Bir Zamanlar-2 (mix) (Ossi Müzik)
- Bir Zamanlar-3 (mix) (Ossi Müzik)
- Re-Mix (mix) (Ossi Müzik)

== Filmography ==
- 1973: Hamsi Nuri
- 1974: Aç Gözünü Memet
- 1974: Evet Mi Hayır Mı
- 1975: Tamam Mı Devam Mı
- 1988: 077 Hızır - Acil Servis
- 1993: İnsanlık Hali
- 2007: Senden Başka

== Published books ==
- Aşk Çiş Gibidir Gelince Tutamazsın
- Aslında Hüzündü Hepsinin Yaşadığı
- Ay Işığında Yıkanan Vücutlar
- Başkaları da Hayatı Deniyor
- Bay G
- Benim Adım Aşk-Sevi
- Bir Kadın Ve Yedi Öfkeli Adam
- Deja Vu Sendromu
- Gezikolik
- Hayat Bir Utanmaz Kitap
- Hayatı Denedim
- Hayatımdan Sayfalar-Şöhretistan
- Herkese Özgürlük Annne, Ama Bana da...
- Matrak Sultan
- Ruhsar Hanım
- Sevişmenin Rengi
- Silikon Hayatlar
- Sinirli Vatandaş
- Valla Kız Değilim
- Var Mısın Benimle Uçmaya
