= Nilüfer (singer) =

Turkish pop singer (born 1955)

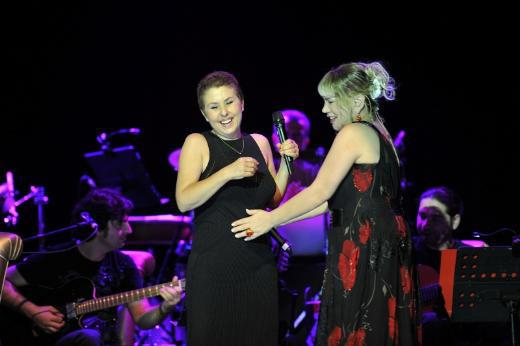
- Nilüfer (left) and Sezen Aksu in a concert in Cemil Topuzlu Open-Air Theatre, 2012
- Born: Nilüfer Yumlu; 31 May 1955 (age 71); Beyoğlu, Istanbul, Turkey
- Education: Liceo Italiano di Istanbul
- Occupations: Singer; songwriter; record producer
- Spouses: Yeşil Giresunlu (m. 1977; div. 1981) Çetin Akcan (m. 1984; div. 1986)
- Children: 1 (adopted)
- Musical career
- Genres: Pop
- Years active: 1972–present
- Labels: Odeon; Burç; Yaşar; Tempa & Foneks; Erol Köse; Seyhan; DMC
- Website: niluferonline.org

Nilüfer Yumlu (born 31 May 1955), commonly known as Nilüfer, is a Turkish pop singer.

== Biography ==
In 1992, one of her biggest hits, "Show Yapma", was included in the album Yine Yeni Yeniden. Also "Kar Taneleri" (1984, Nilüfer '84), "Mor Menekşe" (1988, Esmer Günler), "Esmer Günler" (1988, Esmer Günler), "Eğrisi Doğrusu" (1994, Ne Masal Ne Rüya), "Mavilim" (1997, Nilüfer'le) and "Dünya Dönüyor" (1998, Yeniden Yetmişe) are her well-known hits.

Together with the band Nazar, she represented Turkey in the Eurovision Song Contest 1978, where she shared the 18th place with Seija Simola from Finland. Since 1997 she has been Turkey's National Ambassador to UNICEF. In 1998, she was awarded the honorary title of State Artist of Turkey. She developed breast cancer, but beat the cancer after a nine-month treatment.

== Discography ==
=== Albums ===
- Nilüfer '74 (1974)
- Selam Söyle (1976)
- Müzik (1978)
- 15 Şarkı (1979)
- Nilüfer '79 (1979)
- Nilüfer '80 (1980)
- Sensiz Olmaz (1982)
- Nilüfer '84 (1984)
- Bir Selam Yeter (1985)
- Geceler (1987)
- Esmer Günler (1988)
- Sen Mühimsin (1990)
- Yine Yeni Yeniden (1992)
- Ne Masal Ne Rüya (1994)
- Nilüferle (1997)
- Yeniden Yetmişe (1998)
- Büyük Aşkım (2001)
- Gözünaydın-Olur mu? Olur mu? (2003)
- Sürprizler (2004)
- Karar Verdim (2005)
- Karar Verdim + 3 Remiks (2006)
- Hayal (2009)
- 12 Düet (2011) (sales: 114,000)
- 13 Düet (2013) (sales: 47,000)
- Kendi Cennetim (2015)
- Yeniden Yeni Yine (2016)
- Kendine Bi' Şans Ver (2022)

=== 45rpms and singles ===
- Kalbim Bir Pusula - Ağlıyorum Yine (1972)
- Dünya Dönüyor - Neden (1973)
- Göreceksin Kendini - Aldanırım Sanma (1973)
- Hatıra Defteri - Sen de Söyle (1973)
- Arkadaş Dur Bekle - Kim Ayırdı Sevenleri (1973) (With Modern Folk Trio and Tanju Okan)
- Akdeniz Çocukları - Akdeniz Çocukları (Enstrümental) (1973) (With Ali Kocatepe, Gökben, Ertan Anapa, Esin Engin ve Füsun Önal)
- Al Beni Çal Beni - Körebe (1974)
- Söyle Söyle Sever mi? - Başıma Gelenler (1974)
- Boşver - Boşverdim (1975)
- Oh Ya - Ara Sıra Bazı Bazı (1975)
- Bau Mir ein Paradies - Anatol (1975)
- Ali - Italiano (1975)
- Bilder im Meinem Herzen - Warum mussausgerechnet er es sein (1976)
- Of Aman Aman - Kaderime Kaderime (1976)
- Kim Arar Seni - Başka Sözüm Yok (1977)
- Ne Olacak Şimdi - Pişman Olacaksın (1977)
- Sevince - Darling (1978)
- Oh Oh - Beyaz Mendil (1979)
- Ben Seni Seven Kadın - Kime Küseyim? (1981)
- Sen Beni Tanımamışsın (2008)
- Zalimin Kararı (2010)
- Tik Tak (2019)
- Kara Gözünün Hasretinden (2024)
- Sebebi Sen (2025)
- Bir Güle Kandım (2025)

== Filmography ==
Televizyon

Year	Title	Role	Notes
2019	Jet Sosyete	Herself	Episode 39

Achievements
Preceded by Semiha Yankı with "Seninle Bir Dakika"	Turkey in the Eurovision Song Contest; 1978	Succeeded by Ajda Pekkan with "Pet'r Oil"
