= Portugal in the Eurovision Song Contest 2005 =

- Eurovision Song Contest 2005
- Participating broadcaster: Rádio e Televisão de Portugal (RTP)
- Country: Portugal
- Selection process: Internal selection
- Announcement date: Artist: 22 March 2005; Song: 1 April 2005

Competing entry
- Song: "Amar"
- Artist: 2B
- Songwriters: José da Ponte; Alexandre Honrado; Ernesto Leite

Placement
- Semi-final result: Failed to qualify (17th)

Participation chronology

Portugal was represented at the Eurovision Song Contest 2005 with the song "Amar", written by José da Ponte, Alexandre Honrado, and Ernesto Leite, and performed by the duo 2B. The Portuguese participating broadcaster, Rádio e Televisão de Portugal (RTP), internally selected its entry for the contest. 2B and "Amar" were announced as on 22 March 2005, and the song was presented to the public on 1 April 2005.

Portugal competed in the semi-final of the Eurovision Song Contest which took place on 19 May 2005. Performing during the show in position 3, "Amar" was not announced among the top 10 entries of the semi-final and therefore did not qualify to compete in the final. It was later revealed that Portugal placed seventeenth out of the 25 participating countries in the semi-final with 51 points.

== Background ==
Prior to the 2005 contest, Radiotelevisão Portuguesa (RTP) until 2003, and Rádio e Televisão de Portugal (RTP) in 2004, had participated in the Eurovision Song Contest representing Portugal thirty-eight times since their first entry in 1964. Their highest placing in the contest was sixth, achieved in 1996 with the song "O meu coração não tem cor" performed by Lúcia Moniz. Following the introduction of semi-finals for the 2004, they had, to this point, yet to feature in a final. Their least successful result has been last place, achieved on three occasions, most recently in 1997 with the song "Antes do adeus" performed by Célia Lawson. Portugal has also received nul points on two occasions; in 1964 and 1997. They failed to qualify to the final in 2004 with the song "Foi magia" performed by Sofia Vitória.

As part of its duties as participating broadcaster, RTP organises the selection of its entry in the Eurovision Song Contest and broadcasts the event in the country. The broadcaster confirmed its participation in the 2005 contest on 17 November 2004. RTP has traditionally selected its entries for the contest via the music competition Festival da Canção with an exception in 1988 when the entry was internally selected, a procedure that was held in order to select the 2005 entry due to budget restrictions.

== Before Eurovision ==
=== Internal selection ===
RTP announced on 17 January 2005 that it would internally select its entry for the Eurovision Song Contest 2005. On 23 February 2005, the broadcaster announced that José da Ponte, Alexandre Honrado, and Ernesto Leite had been invited to create the song, while its performer would be chosen by RTP. José da Ponte had written the former Eurovision Song Contest entry "Lusitana paixão" performed by Dulce Pontes, which represented Portugal in 1991.

On 22 March 2005, RTP announced "Amar" performed by the duo 2B as the Portuguese entry for the Eurovision Song Contest 2005. The duo consisted of Luciana Abreu and Rui Drumond, who participated in the second season and first season of the reality singing competitions Ídolos and Operação Triunfo, respectively, where they both placed sixth. "Amar", which was composed by Ernesto Leite and José da Ponte with lyrics by Alexandre Honrado, Ernesto Leite and José da Ponte, was planned to be presented to the public on 31 March 2005 during the RTP 70th anniversary show Gala de Aniversário RTP, however the song was presented on 1 April 2005 via the release of the official music video instead.

== At Eurovision ==
According to Eurovision rules, all nations with the exceptions of the host country, the "Big Four" (France, Germany, Spain and the United Kingdom), and the ten highest placed finishers in the 2004 contest are required to qualify from the semi-final on 19 May 2005 in order to compete for the final on 21 May 2005; the top ten countries from the semi-final progress to the final. On 22 March 2005, a special allocation draw was held which determined the running order for the semi-final and Portugal was set to perform in position 3, following the entry from Lithuania and before the entry from Moldova. At the end of the show, Portugal was not announced among the top 10 entries in the semi-final and therefore failed to qualify to compete in the final. It was later revealed that Portugal placed seventeenth in the semi-final, receiving a total of 51 points. The semi-final performance was known for its overall technical mishaps, including Luciana Abreu's faulty microphone.

In Portugal, the two shows were broadcast on RTP1 and RTP Internacional with commentary by Eládio Clímaco. RTP appointed Isabel Angelino as its spokesperson to announce the Portuguese votes during the final.

=== Voting ===
Below is a breakdown of points awarded to Portugal and awarded by Portugal in the semi-final and grand final of the contest. The nation awarded its 12 points to Belgium's Portugal-born Nuno Resende in the semi-final and to Romania in the final of the contest.

==== Points awarded to Portugal ====
Points awarded to Portugal (Semi-final)
Score	Country
12 points	France; Germany; Switzerland
10 points	Belgium
8 points	
7 points	
6 points	
5 points	Spain
4 points	
3 points	
2 points	
1 point	

==== Points awarded by Portugal ====
Points awarded by Portugal (Semi-final)
Score	Country
12 points	Belgium
10 points	Romania
8 points	Moldova
7 points	Hungary
6 points	Israel
5 points	Denmark
4 points	Latvia
3 points	Croatia
2 points	Switzerland
1 point	Norway

Points awarded by Portugal (Final)
Score	Country
12 points	Romania
10 points	Moldova
8 points	Spain
7 points	Ukraine
6 points	Latvia
5 points	Israel
4 points	Switzerland
3 points	Greece
2 points	Hungary
1 point	Denmark
