= Nonstop (band) =

Portuguese girl band

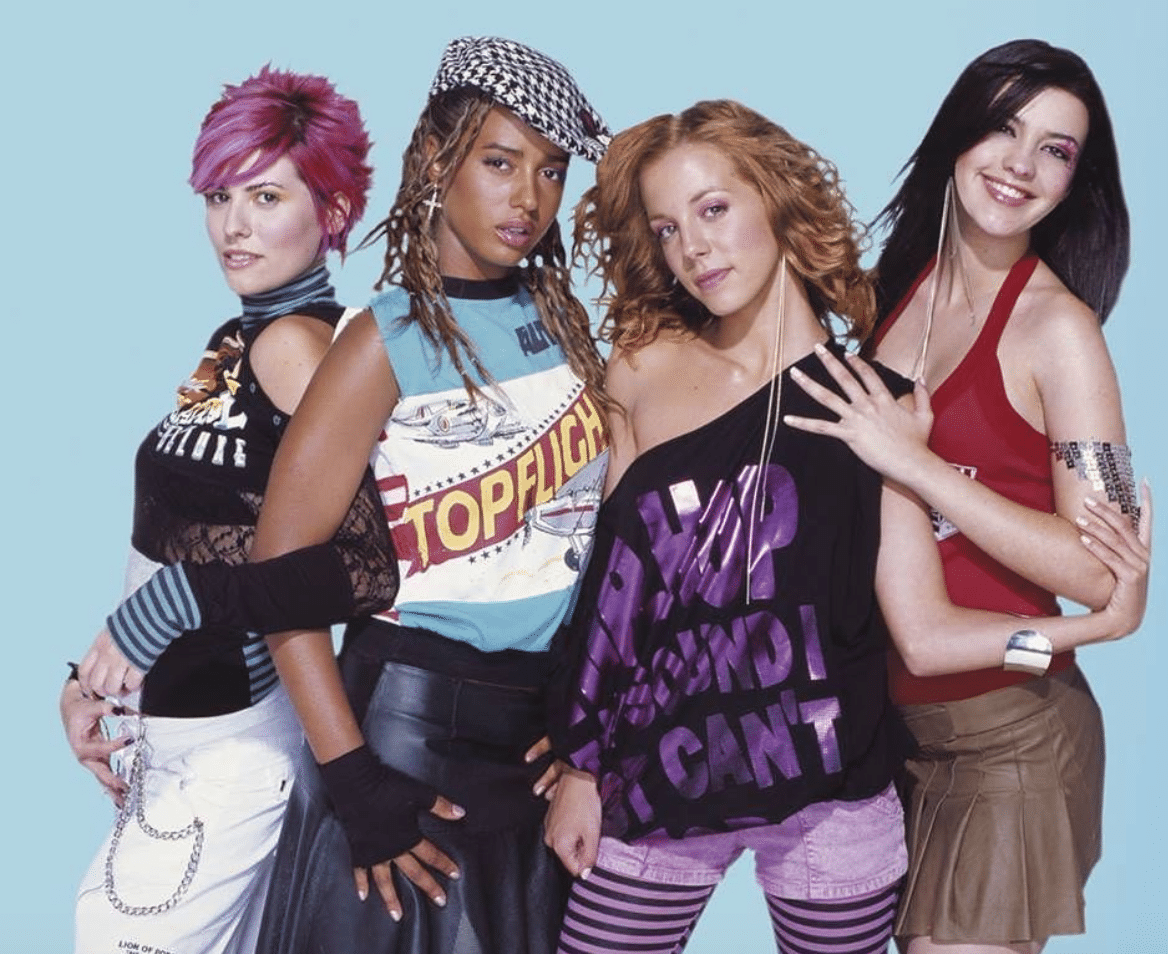
- Nonstop in 2004

Background information
- Origin: Lisbon, Portugal
- Genres: Pop, teen pop
- Years active: 2001–2007
- Label: EMI (2001-2005)
- Members: Rita Reis; Kátia Moreira; Andrea Soares; Liliana Almeida
- Past members: Fátima Sousa

Nonstop was a Portuguese girl group, created through TV reality-competition show Popstars, in 2001. Nonstop achieved notable success with their debut album, Nonstop, and single, "Ao Limite Eu Vou".

Songwriter and producer Eliot Kennedy, who had previously worked with bands like the Spice Girls and Take That, once said "they are probably the best group I have worked with. Their voices are so good!"

== Becoming Popstars ==
Following its success in Australia, Germany and the U.K, the dream catcher reality-show Popstars arrived in Portugal via SIC in 2001, looking to create a five-piece girl group.

Over 1,200 girls attended auditions, held in the cities of Coimbra, Porto, Faro and Lisbon, with hopes of securing a spot in the band.

During auditions in Faro, Liliana Almeida saw her participation be denied due to age restrictions - she was only 17. Almeida would eventually make it to the last day of auditions in Lisbon, which coincided with her 18th birthday.

By April 4 2001, the five finalists had been chosen: Andrea Soares, Ana Rita Reis, Fátima Sousa, Kátia Moreira and Liliana Almeida were to become Portugal's Popstars. The girls named themselves Nonstop.

== Nonstop, the album ==
Nonstop's first single, "Ao Limite Eu Vou", was produced by Steelworks duo Tim Woodcock and Eliot Kennedy. The song became one of the biggest hits of summer 2001 in Portugal, reaching the top spot on the national music charts.

Nonstop's self-titled debut album was released on July 16, 2001. The album went to sell over 30,000 copies and was certified Gold.

Along with their success in Portugal came the interest of other countries, like Canada, Belgium, and South Africa. This same interest brought the Steelworks team back to Portugal, so that some of the album songs could be re-recorded in their original English versions.

Following the popularity of the song, "Basta Um Sorriso" was chosen to become the group's second single. Miguel Gaudêncio, who had worked with the girls on their first music video, was brought back to work with the group on what was intended to be the first Portuguese 3D music video for the song. However, the project would end up being scrapped in the end, due to lack of funds.

In January 2002, Fátima announced that she would be leaving the band. The remaining girls decided to go on as a four piece.

Nonstop continued promotion of their self-titled album by releasing a third single, "Não Há Nada Em Mim". The girls were often in the press and on TV, including a cameo appearance on the popular Portuguese teen series Uma Aventura... (still with Fatima). They also had a very strong online presence at the time, with a daily updated website Diary. Furthermore, "Olhar P'ra Ti (Só Para Ti)" was added to the original soundtrack of the Portuguese telenovela Fúria de Viver.

While touring, the band started recording new material, including a cover of the Moulin Rouge version of Patti LaBelle's "Lady Marmalade".

In August 2002, Nonstop was invited to perform "Ao Limite Eu Vou" on the Spanish edition of Popstars: Tudo Por Un Sueño. Soon after, the girls would part ways with their management at NZ Produções and join Lemon Entertainment.

== E Tudo Vai Mudar ==
By the end of 2003, Nonstop was ready to release new music. After premiering their new single "E Tudo Vai Mudar" at the MTV Shakedown finale, that was held in Lisbon, the girls went to release their second studio album, Tudo Vai Mudar, on May 5 2004. Similarly to Nonstop, the album featured production from Steelworks. Portuguese producers as AC Firmino and Augusto Armada (Gutto); Carlos Juvantes and Gonçalo Pereira also worked with the group, providing them a "more mature" sound. The lead single, "E Tudo Vai Mudar", was amongst the 30 most played Portuguese songs on the radio of 2004, making Nonstop the only exclusively female artist/group featured on that list. Both the MTV Shakedown performance and official music video for the song were on high rotation on MTV Portugal. Nonstop continued to make appearances on TV, usually singing live. They were also guest stars on TVI's prime time series Inspector Max.

The girls' fifth single, "Play-back", a cover of Carlos Paião's hit in the 80s, was released on 17 July 2004. Nonstop had previously covered the song, in 2003, on RTP's Domingo É Domingo, where they performed with a live band. However, the recorded version for the album would see different arrangements, with the girls picking up different parts of the song. Nonstop premiered their single live on SIC's primetime talk-show HermanSIC, after participating in a little comedy sketch with its host Herman José.

The "Tudo Vai Mudar Tour" took the girls abroad, to countries like Canada and France. In Portugal, Nonstop was the opening act of Ronan Keating's concert.

In 2005, Rita Reis was featured on two albums: Boss AC's Ritmo, Amor e Palavras, on the song "És Mais Que Uma Mulher"; and Gutto's Chokolate, the duet Importante. Rita, Andrea and Liliana would also make an appearance on Gutto's music video for "Só Quero Dançar".

== Coisas de Nada, Eurovision Song Contest ==
After years of fighting for more creative freedom, Nonstop and their production company Videomedia parted ways. The girls decided to take advantage of this situation and manage themselves independently.

Still in 2005, the group were invited to do a cover of Boney M's "Daddy Cool" for RTP's Father's Days contest special of Um, Dois, Três. For Christmas, Nonstop performed on RTP's Gala Sonhos de Natal with a live band, performing a cover of Britney Spears' "My Only Wish (This Year)".

In future TV appearances, the girls would choose to promote the ballad "Assim Como És", produced by AC and Gutto, and E Tudo Vai Mudar's original version, "Sooner Or Later".

At the beginning of 2006, Nonstop were invited by music producer Elvis Veiguinha to record "Coisas de Nada" (originally entitled Vem Dançar), one of two songs he had submitted for the RTP - Festival da Canção 2006. The contest took place on 10 March – Liliana's birthday – at Lisbon's Centro de Congressos. After a tie with fan favourite "Sei Quem Sou (Portugal)", by Vânia Oliveira, the jury's vote would overrule Coisas de Nada as the winner and would represent Portugal at the Eurovision Song Contest 2006, in Athens.

On 18 May 2006, following the same fate of previous Portuguese entries, Nonstop failed to make it to the final, coming in at 19th place on the semi-final. Furthermore, Eurovision fans would present them with the Barbara Dex Award for worst-dressed act of that year.

== Disbandment, solo projects ==
Despite the Eurovision results, Nonstop was eager to stay together and make new music. The girls would go into the studio to record new material, but would not agree on a "sound" for the group.

For SIC's 14th anniversary, Nonstop performed "E Tudo Vai Mudar" in downtown Lisbon, during the Grande Parada de Aniversário da SIC parade.

In February 2007, Liliana featured on Gutto's "Deixa Ferver"', along with Boss AC.

In March 2007, Kátia was invited by RTP to record the national broadcaster's 50 anniversary anthem, "O Primeiro Olhar", along with Anabela Brito and Operação Triunfo contestants David Ripado e Filipe Gonçalves. Appropriately, Kátia would be invited to record her own version of the song, that she would later perform at the Festival da Canção of that year. During the commemorations of the 50th anniversary, Andrea, Liliana and Kátia would be honoured for representing RTP/Portugal in Eurovision, alongside other Portuguese entries from the last 50 years.

In April 2007, days after performing at a fundraising event in Setúbal, Kátia announced her departure from the group. The remaining trio promised to honour all Nonstop's commitments, and although there were plans for new music, nothing ever materialized.

In 2008, the girls ventured in new projects. Rita teamed up with Gutto once again to be featured on Black Company's comeback album, Fora De Série, while Andrea and Liliana starred in the musical theatre productions of High School Musical and Fame. Kátia would also venture in musical theatre, joining the cast of Filipe La Féria's Jesus Christ Superstar.

Individually, the girls were on the forefront of the Portuguese house music scene, collaborating with national DJs on various tracks, including hits "Selfish Love" (2009), "Ibiza For Dreams" (2009) and "My World" (2011).

In 2012, Rita replaced Mónica Ferraz as the lead singer of Mesa.

In 2014, Andrea and Liliana reunited under the name Projecto Kaya, a musical project that mixes fado and semba with EDM. That same year, all four members would reunite for the first time since 2007, at a Mesa concert.

On 28 April 2017, Nonstop would make a surprise appearance at the Revenge of the 90s party. The girls performed "Ao Limite Eu Vou". The surprise was so well received that the girls would join the Revenge of the 90s on tour until its last event in 2022.

In 2017, Katia auditioned for the fifth season of The Voice Portugal and joined Anselmo Ralph's team. She made it all the way to the final, finishing in third place.

In 2018, the girls were invited by ILGA Portugal to headline the Arraial Lisboa Pride.

== Discography ==
=== Albums ===
Year	Title	
Year	Title	Portuguese Album Chart
2001	Nonstop	Gold
2004	Tudo Vai Mudar	

=== Singles ===
Year	Title	Album
2001	Ao Limite Eu Vou	Nonstop
2001	Basta Um Sorriso	Nonstop
2002	Não Há Nada Em Mim	Nonstop
2004	E Tudo Vai Mudar	Tudo Vai Mudar
2004	Play-Back	Tudo Vai Mudar
2005	Assim Como És	Tudo Vai Mudar
2006	Coisas de Nada	Eurovision Song Contest 2006

=== Featured singles ===
Year	Title
2006	Deixa Ferver Gutto Ft. Liliana

=== Music videos ===
Year	Title
2000	Ao Limite Eu Vou
2004	E Tudo Vai Mudar
2006	Deixa Ferver Gutto Ft. Liliana

Preceded by MTM with "Só sei ser feliz assim" (2001)	Festival da Canção Winner; 2006	Succeeded by Sabrina with "Dança comigo"
Preceded by 2B with "Amar"	Portugal in the Eurovision Song Contest; 2006	Succeeded by Sabrina with "Dança comigo"
