= Vânia Fernandes =

Portuguese singer (born 1985)

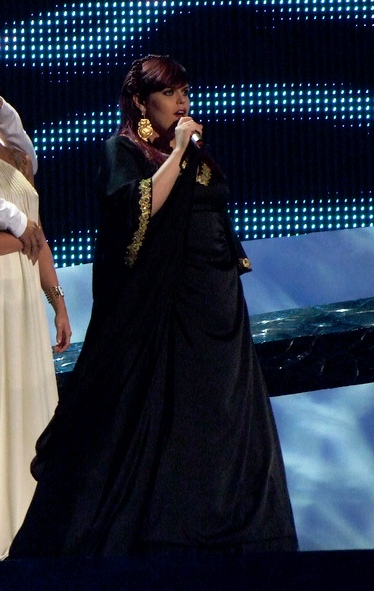
- Vânia Fernandes singing "Senhora do Mar", in ESC 2008, dressed in black

Background information
- Born: Vânia Sofia Olim Marote de Ribeiro Fernandes; 25 September 1984 (age 41)
- Origin: Funchal, Madeira, Portugal
- Genres: Pop, jazz
- Occupation: Singer
- Years active: 1999–present

Vânia Sofia Olim Marote de Ribeiro Fernandes (born 25 September 1984) is a Portuguese singer from Funchal, Madeira (Portugal).

Known for her powerful stage presence, as well as her prominent and versatile voice, Fernandes has participated in several singing contests and performed in public in both her home island of Madeira and on the mainland of Portugal since 1997.

In 2007, Vânia won Portuguese public television's talent contest, Operação Triunfo (the Portuguese version of Star Academy). That same year, she completed her professional music studies and training in singing, including jazz, at Madeira's Conservatory.

On 22 May 2008 Fernandes sung "Senhora do mar" (Lady of the Sea) during the second semi-final of the Eurovision Song Contest 2008 in Belgrade, Serbia. The song was the winner of the 2008 edition of Portugal's national selection final for Eurovision, the Festival da Canção. She represented Portugal in the Eurovision final on 24 May 2008 and gained 13th place (out of 25) with 69 points. In the semi-final, she was 2nd, with 120 points.

Preceded by Sabrina with "Dança comigo"	Festival da Canção Winner; 2008	Succeeded by Flor-de-Lis with "Todas as ruas do amor"
Preceded by Sabrina with "Dança comigo"	Portugal in the Eurovision Song Contest; 2008	Succeeded by Flor-de-Lis with "Todas as ruas do amor"
