= Armando Gama =

Portuguese singer-songwriter (1954–2022)

- Born: Armando António Capelo Diniz da Gama; 1 April 1954; Luanda, Portuguese Angola, Portugal
- Died: 17 January 2022 (aged 67) Lisbon, Portugal
- Genres: Pop
- Occupation: Singer-songwriter
- Years active: 1971–2022
- Label: Columbia Records

Armando António Capelo Diniz da Gama (1 April 1954 – 17 January 2022) was a Portuguese singer-songwriter and baritone opera singer, whose physical trademark for decades was his shoulder-length jet black hair.

== Life and career ==
Gama grew up in Portuguese Angola, an overseas territory of Portugal by then, and lived there until the age of 17. Upon moving to mainland Portugal in 1971, he scored the first of many No. 1 hits on the Portuguese music charts. He was well-versed in performing piano and solfège, having studied them at the music conservatory in Luanda until he was a teenager.

In his decades-long music career, he sold over five million records in Portugal alone. He became well-known internationally performing at the Eurovision Song Contest 1983, singing the song "Esta balada que te dou," ranking 13th out of 20 countries. Gama still performed in his later years, and presented a live show called "Armando Gama: The Fifth Beatle," in which he performed cover versions of well-known songs by The Beatles.

Gama died of pancreatic cancer at Instituto Português de Oncologia Francisco Gentil in Lisbon on 17 January 2022, at the age of 67.

Awards and achievements
Preceded by Doce with "Bem bom"	Portugal in the Eurovision Song Contest; 1983	Succeeded by Maria Guinot with "Silêncio e tanta gente"
