= Portugal in the Eurovision Song Contest =

- Eurovision Song Contest
- Participating broadcaster: Rádio e Televisão de Portugal (RTP)

Participation summary
- Appearances: 57 (47 finals)
- First appearance: 1964
- Highest placement: 1st: 2017
- Host: 2018
- Participation history: 1964; 1965; 1966; 1967; 1968; 1969; 1970; 1971; 1972; 1973; 1974; 1975; 1976; 1977; 1978; 1979; 1980; 1981; 1982; 1983; 1984; 1985; 1986; 1987; 1988; 1989; 1990; 1991; 1992; 1993; 1994; 1995; 1996; 1997; 1998; 1999; 2000; 2001; 2002; 2003; 2004; 2005; 2006; 2007; 2008; 2009; 2010; 2011; 2012; 2013; 2014; 2015; 2016; 2017; 2018; 2019; ~~2020~~; 2021; 2022; 2023; 2024; 2025; 2026

Related articles
- Festival da Canção
- Portugal's page at Eurovision.com
- For the most recent participation see Portugal in the Eurovision Song Contest 2026

Portugal has been represented at the Eurovision Song Contest 57 times since its debut in 1964, missing five contests (1970, 2000, 2002, 2013, and 2016). The current Portuguese participating broadcaster in the contest is Rádio e Televisão de Portugal (RTP), which selects its entrant with the national selection Festival da Canção. Portugal won the contest for the first time in 2017 and hosted the 2018 contest in Lisbon.

Portugal finished last on its debut in 1964 and again in 1974, before achieving its best result of the 20th century in 1996, with "O meu coração não tem cor" performed by Lúcia Moniz finishing sixth. The country then finished last for the third time in 1997. Having not appeared in the final since 2010 and as holders of the record for most appearances in the contest without a win, Portugal won at the 49th attempt, when "Amar pelos dois" by Salvador Sobral won the 2017 contest, Portugal's first top-five result in the contest. As hosts in 2018, the country finished last in the contest for a fourth time.

== Participation ==
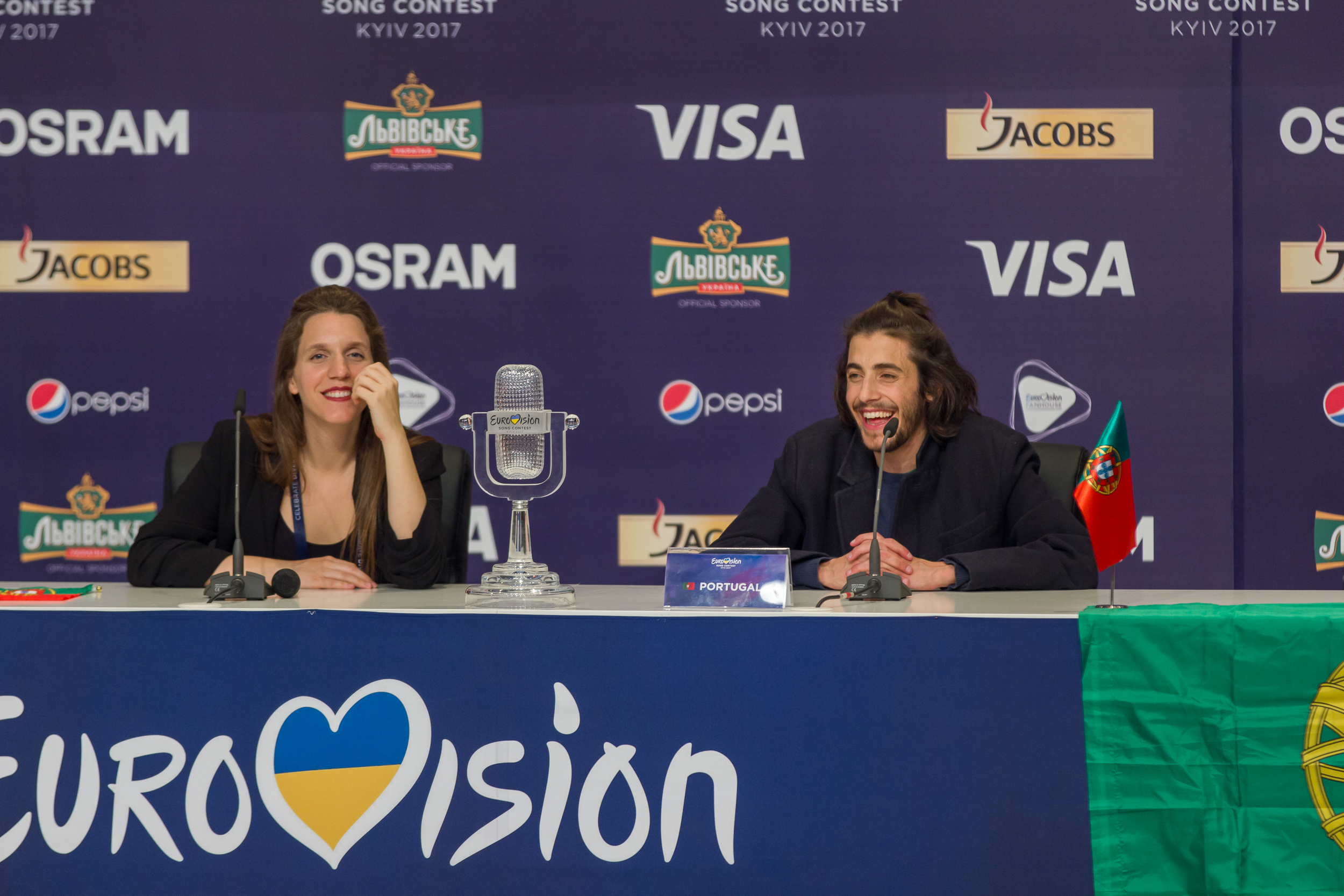
Salvador Sobral (right) at a press conference following his win at the 2017 contest, with his sister Luísa (left)

Radiotelevisão Portuguesa was a full member of the European Broadcasting Union (EBU), thus eligible to participate in the Eurovision Song Contest. It participated in the contest representing Portugal since its ninth edition in 1964. Since 2004, after a restructuring that led to the incorporation of Radiotelevisão Portuguesa into the current Rádio e Televisão de Portugal (RTP), it is the latter who participates representing Portugal.

== History ==
Portugal's debut entry was "Oração" by António Calvário. It was not a successful debut for the country, with Calvário coming last in the contest. Since then, Portugal has come last on three further occasions, in 1974 with "E depois do adeus" by Paulo de Carvalho, in 1997 with "Antes do adeus" by Célia Lawson, and in 2018 as a host country. Despite its last-place finish in the contest, "E depois do adeus" gained notability for being used as the radio musical signal to begin the Carnation Revolution against the Estado Novo regime, being played at 22:55 on 24 April 1974. Prior to its sixth-place finish for "O meu coração não tem cor" by Lúcia Moniz in 1996, Portugal's best result in the contest was two seventh-place finishes, for Carlos Mendes in 1972 and José Cid in 1980. Despite prior poor results, the 1990s were the most successful decade for the country, with four recorded finishes in the top 10. Portugal was relegated in 2000 due to insufficient points accrued, and withdrew in 2002 due to financial difficulties (allowing Latvia, who ultimately won, to compete).

Since semi-finals were introduced in 2004, Portugal has failed to reach the final eight times, including from 2004 to 2007. In 2008, "Senhora do mar" by Vânia Fernandes finished 13th, Portugal's best result since 1996. The country continued to be present in the final until 2010. In 2017, Portugal reached the finals with "Amar pelos dois" by Salvador Sobral, ending a 6-year non-appearance in the finals, as it did not participate in the contest in 2013 and 2016 and did not qualify for the finals in 2011, 2012, 2014 and 2015, finally winning the contest for the first time ever, earning 758 points, setting the record for the highest number of points in the history of the competition, topping both the televoting and jury voting for the first time since Austria's "Rise Like a Phoenix" in 2014. It was the first winning song entirely performed in a country's native language since Serbia's "Molitva" in 2007. As the host country in 2018, Portugal came last for the fourth time in the contest, and for the first time in a non-joint last position. This was the third instance of a host country placing in the bottom five since 2015. Following a non-qualification in 2019, Portugal recorded a 12th-place finish in 2021, a ninth-place finish in 2022, a 23rd-place finish in 2023, a tenth-place finish in 2024 and a 21st-place finish in 2025, and failing to qualify for the final in 2026 which was the first time in the 2020s that Portugal failed to qualify for the final with the last time being in 2019.

=== Absences ===
Portugal has been absent from five contests since their first participation. The country's first absence was in 1970, where Portugal, along with four other countries, boycotted the contest due to the result of the previous year, when four countries were announced the winner.

Portugal missed the 2000 contest due to their poor average results over the past five years. Despite being eligible to enter the 2002 contest, RTP declined to enter, and was replaced by eventual winner Latvia.

The fourth absence was in 2013, when Portugal didn't participate for financial reasons. The fifth absence was in 2016. RTP stated that this break was needed in order to facilitate a content renewal for its national selection for the Eurovision Song Contest, Festival da Canção.

== Festival da Canção ==
Festival da Canção (sometimes referred to as "Festival RTP da Canção") is the Portuguese national selection for the Eurovision Song Contest, organized by RTP, and is normally held between February and March of the year of the contest. It is one of the longest-running Eurovision selection methods. Previously a number of regional juries selected the winner, however, the winner has been selected through televoting in recent years. In 2009, 2010 and since 2017, a 50/50 system between regional juries and televoting has been used.

In the years when Portugal does not participate in the contest, Festival da Canção was not held, except in two occasions: in 1970, when Portugal boycotted the contest, and in 2000, when the country was relegated.

== Participation overview ==
Table key
1	First place
2	Second place
◁	Last place
◇	Entry selected but did not compete

Year	Artist	Song	Language	Final	Points	Semi	Points
1964	António Calvário	"Oração"	Portuguese	13 ◁	0	No semi-finals	
1965	Simone de Oliveira	"Sol de inverno"	Portuguese	13	1	No semi-finals	
1966	Madalena Iglésias	"Ele e ela"	Portuguese	13	6	No semi-finals	
1967	Eduardo Nascimento	"O vento mudou"	Portuguese	12	3	No semi-finals	
1968	Carlos Mendes	"Verão"	Portuguese	11	5	No semi-finals	
1969	Simone de Oliveira	"Desfolhada portuguesa"	Portuguese	15	4	No semi-finals	
1971	Tonicha	"Menina do alto da serra"	Portuguese	9	83	No semi-finals	
1972	Carlos Mendes	"A festa da vida"	Portuguese	7	90	No semi-finals	
1973	Fernando Tordo	"Tourada"	Portuguese	10	80	No semi-finals	
1974	Paulo de Carvalho	"E depois do adeus"	Portuguese	14 ◁	3	No semi-finals	
1975	Duarte Mendes	"Madrugada"	Portuguese	16	16	No semi-finals	
1976	Carlos do Carmo	"Uma flor de verde pinho"	Portuguese	12	24	No semi-finals	
1977	Os Amigos	"Portugal no coração"	Portuguese	14	18	No semi-finals	
1978	Gemini	"Dai li dou"	Portuguese	17	5	No semi-finals	
1979	Manuela Bravo	"Sobe, sobe, balão sobe"	Portuguese	9	64	No semi-finals	
1980	José Cid	"Um grande, grande amor"	Portuguese	7	71	No semi-finals	
1981	Carlos Paião	"Playback"	Portuguese	18	9	No semi-finals	
1982	Doce	"Bem bom"	Portuguese	13	32	No semi-finals	
1983	Armando Gama	"Esta balada que te dou"	Portuguese	13	33	No semi-finals	
1984	Maria Guinot	"Silêncio e tanta gente"	Portuguese	11	38	No semi-finals	
1985	Adelaide	"Penso em ti, eu sei"	Portuguese	18	9	No semi-finals	
1986	Dora	"Não sejas mau p'ra mim"	Portuguese	14	28	No semi-finals	
1987	Nevada	"Neste barco à vela"	Portuguese	18	15	No semi-finals	
1988	Dora	"Voltarei"	Portuguese	18	5	No semi-finals	
1989	Da Vinci	"Conquistador"	Portuguese	16	39	No semi-finals	
1990	Nucha	"Há sempre alguém"	Portuguese	20	9	No semi-finals	
1991	Dulce	"Lusitana paixão"	Portuguese	8	62	No semi-finals	
1992	Dina	"Amor d'água fresca"	Portuguese	17	26	No semi-finals	
1993	Anabela	"A cidade até ser dia"	Portuguese	10	60	Kvalifikacija za Millstreet	
1994	Sara	"Chamar a música"	Portuguese	8	73	No semi-finals	
1995	Tó Cruz	"Baunilha e chocolate"	Portuguese	21	5	No semi-finals	
1996	Lúcia Moniz	"O meu coração não tem cor"	Portuguese	6	92	18	32
1997	Célia Lawson	"Antes do adeus"	Portuguese	24 ◁	0	No semi-finals	
1998	Alma Lusa	"Se eu te pudesse abraçar"	Portuguese	12	36	No semi-finals	
1999	Rui Bandeira	"Como tudo começou"	Portuguese	21	12	No semi-finals	
2001	MTM	"Só sei ser feliz assim"	Portuguese	17	18	No semi-finals	
2003	Rita Guerra	"Deixa-me sonhar"	Portuguese, English	22	13	No semi-finals	
2004	Sofia Vitória	"Foi magia"	Portuguese	Failed to qualify		15	38
2005	2B	"Amar"	Portuguese, English	Failed to qualify		17	51
2006	Nonstop	"Coisas de nada"	Portuguese, English	Failed to qualify		19	26
2007	Sabrina	"Dança comigo"	Portuguese	Failed to qualify		11	88
2008	Vânia Fernandes	"Senhora do mar (negras águas)"	Portuguese	13	69	2	120
2009	Flor-de-Lis	"Todas as ruas do amor"	Portuguese	15	57	8	70
2010	Filipa Azevedo	"Há dias assim"	Portuguese	18	43	4	89
2011	Homens da Luta	"A luta é alegria"	Portuguese	Failed to qualify		18	22
2012	Filipa Sousa	"Vida minha"	Portuguese	Failed to qualify		13	39
2014	Suzy	"Quero ser tua"	Portuguese	Failed to qualify		11	39
2015	Leonor Andrade	"Há um mar que nos separa"	Portuguese	Failed to qualify		14	19
2017	Salvador Sobral	"Amar pelos dois"	Portuguese	1	758	1	370
2018	Cláudia Pascoal (Note: Performance contains uncredited live vocals from Isaura)	"O jardim"	Portuguese	26 ◁	39	Host country	
2019	Conan Osíris	"Telemóveis"	Portuguese	Failed to qualify		15	51
2020	Elisa ◇	"Medo de sentir" ◇	Portuguese ◇	Contest cancelled (Note: The 2020 contest was cancelled due to the COVID-19 pandemic.)			
2021	The Black Mamba	"Love Is on My Side"	English	12	153	4	239
2022	Maro	"Saudade, saudade"	English, Portuguese	9	207	4	208
2023	Mimicat	"Ai coração"	Portuguese	23	59	9	74
2024	Iolanda	"Grito"	Portuguese	10	152	8	58
2025	Napa	"Deslocado"	Portuguese	21	50	9	56
2026	Bandidos do Cante	"Rosa"	Portuguese	Failed to qualify		12	74
2027	Confirmed intention to participate †						

== Hostings ==
Year	Location	Venue	Presenters	Image
2018	Lisbon	Altice Arena	Catarina Furtado, Daniela Ruah, Filomena Cautela and Sílvia Alberto	

== Awards ==
=== Marcel Bezençon Awards ===
Year	Category	Song	Composer	Performer	Final	Points	Host city	Ref.
2008	Press Award	"Senhora do mar (negras águas)"	Andrej Babić, Carlos Coelho	Vânia Fernandes	13	69	(Serbia) Belgrade	
2017	Artistic Award (Note: Voted by commentators.)	"Amar pelos dois"	Luísa Sobral	Salvador Sobral	1	758	(Ukraine) Kyiv	
2017	Composer Award	"Amar pelos dois"	Luísa Sobral	Salvador Sobral	1	758	(Ukraine) Kyiv	

=== Barbara Dex Award ===
Year	Performer	Host city	Ref.
2006	Nonstop	(Greece) Athens	
2019	Conan Osiris	(Israel) Tel Aviv	

== Related involvement ==
=== Conductors ===
Year	Conductor (Note: All conductors are of Portuguese nationality unless otherwise noted.)	Notes	Ref.
1964	(Denmark) Kai Mortensen		
1965	Fernando de Carvalho		
1966	Jorge Costa Pinto		
1967	Armando Tavares Belo		
1968	Joaquim Luis Gomes		
1969	Ferrer Trindade		
1971	Jorge Costa Pinto		
1972	(United Kingdom) Richard Hill		
1973	Jorge Costa Pinto		
1974	Jose Calvário		
1975	Pedro Osório		
1976	(Germany) Thilo Krasmann		
1977	Jose Calvário		
1978	(Germany) Thilo Krasmann		
1979	(Germany) Thilo Krasmann		
1980	Jorge Machado		
1981	Segundo Galarza		
1982	Luis Duarte		
1983	(United Kingdom) Mike Sergeant		
1984	Pedro Osório		
1985	Jose Calvário		
1986	(United Kingdom) Colin Frechter		
1987	Jaime Oliveira		
1988	Jose Calvário		
1989	Luis Duarte		
1990	Carlos Alberto Moniz		
1991	Fernando Correia Martins		
1992	Carlos Alberto Moniz		
1993	Armindo Neves		
1994	(Germany) Thilo Krasmann		
1995	(Germany) Thilo Krasmann		
1996	Pedro Osório		
1997	(Germany) Thilo Krasmann		
1998	(United Kingdom) Mike Sergeant		

Additionally, there was an orchestra present at the Portuguese national final in 1999 and 2001, where the winning entries were conducted by José Marinho and Rui Filipe Reis, respectively.

=== Heads of delegation ===
Year	Head of delegation	Ref.
2015–present	Carla Bugalho	

=== Commentators and spokespersons ===
Year	Television commentator	Radio commentator	Spokesperson	Ref.
1963	Federico Gallo	Unknown	Did not participate	
1964	Gomes Ferreira	Unknown	Maria Manuela Furtado	
1965	Gomes Ferreira	Unknown	Maria Manuela Furtado	
1966	Fialho Gouveia	Unknown	Maria Manuela Furtado	
1967	Fialho Gouveia	Unknown	Maria Manuela Furtado	
1968	Fialho Gouveia	Unknown	Maria Manuela Furtado	
1969	Henrique Mendes	Unknown	Maria Manuela Furtado	
1970	Henrique Mendes	Unknown	Did not participate	
1971	Henrique Mendes	Unknown	No spokesperson	
1972	Henrique Mendes	Amadeu Meireles	No spokesperson	
1973	Artur Agostinho	Amadeu Meireles	No spokesperson	
1974	Artur Agostinho	Unknown	Henrique Mendes	
1975	Júlio Isidro	Amadeu Meireles	Ana Zanatti	
1976	Unknown	Amadeu Meireles	Ana Zanatti	
1977	José Côrte-Real	Amadeu Meireles	Ana Zanatti	
1978	Eládio Clímaco	Amadeu Meireles	Isabel Wolmar	
1979	Fialho Gouveia	Unknown	João Abel da Fonseca	
1980	Isabel Wolmar	Unknown	Teresa Cruz	
1981	Eládio Clímaco	Unknown	Margarida Andrade	
1982	Fialho Gouveia	Unknown	Margarida Andrade	
1983	Eládio Clímaco	Unknown	João Abel Fonseca	
1984	Fialho Gouveia	Unknown	Eládio Clímaco	
1985	Eládio Clímaco	Unknown	Maria Margarida Gaspar	
1986	Fialho Gouveia	Fialho Gouveia	Margarida Andrade	
1987	Maria Margarida Gaspar	Unknown	Ana Zanatti	
1988	Margarida Andrade	Unknown	Maria Margarida Gaspar	
1989	Ana Zanatti	Unknown	Margarida Andrade	
1990	Ana do Carmo	Unknown	João Abel Fonseca	
1991	Ana do Carmo	Unknown	Maria Margarida Gaspar	
1992	Eládio Clímaco	Unknown	Ana Zanatti	
1993	Isabel Bahia	Unknown	Margarida Mercês de Mello	
1994	Eládio Clímaco	Unknown	Isabel Bahia	
1995	Ana do Carmo	Unknown	Serenella Andrade	
1996	Maria Margarida Gaspar	Unknown	Cristina Rocha	
1997	Carlos Ribeiro	Unknown	Cristina Rocha	
1998	Rui Unas	Unknown	Lúcia Moniz	
1999	Rui Unas	João David Nunes	Manuel Luís Goucha	
2000	Eládio Clímaco	Unknown	Did not participate	
2001	Eládio Clímaco	Unknown	Margarida Mercês de Mello	
2002	Eládio Clímaco	Unknown	Did not participate	
2003	Margarida Mercês de Mello	Unknown	Helena Ramos	
2004	Eládio Clímaco	Unknown	Isabel Angelino	
2005	Eládio Clímaco	Unknown	Isabel Angelino	
2006	Eládio Clímaco	Unknown	Cristina Alves	
2007	Isabel Angelino, Jorge Gabriel	Unknown	Francisco Mendes	
2008	Isabel Angelino, Jorge Gabriel	Unknown	Teresa Villa-Lobos	
2009	Hélder Reis	No radio broadcast	Helena Coelho	
2010	Sérgio Mateus	No radio broadcast	Ana Galvão	
2011	Sílvia Alberto	No radio broadcast	Joana Teles	
2012	Pedro Granger	No radio broadcast	Joana Teles	
2013	Sílvia Alberto	No radio broadcast	Did not participate	
2014	Sílvia Alberto	No radio broadcast	Joana Teles	
2015	Hélder Reis, Ramon Galarza	No radio broadcast	Suzy	
2016	Hélder Reis, Nuno Galopim (final)	No radio broadcast	Did not participate	
2017	José Carlos Malato, Nuno Galopim	No radio broadcast	Filomena Cautela	
2018	Hélder Reis, Nuno Galopim	Noémia Gonçalves, António Macedo, Tozé Brito	Pedro Fernandes	
2019	José Carlos Malato, Nuno Galopim	Unknown	Inês Lopes Gonçalves	
2021	José Carlos Malato, Nuno Galopim	Unknown	Elisa Silva	
2022	Nuno Galopim	Unknown	Pedro Tatanka	
2023	José Carlos Malato, Nuno Galopim	Unknown	Maro	
2024	José Carlos Malato, Nuno Galopim	No radio broadcast	Mimicat	
2025	José Carlos Malato, Nuno Galopim	No radio broadcast	Iolanda	
2026	José Carlos Malato, Nuno Galopim	No radio broadcast	Victoria Nicole	

== Photo gallery ==
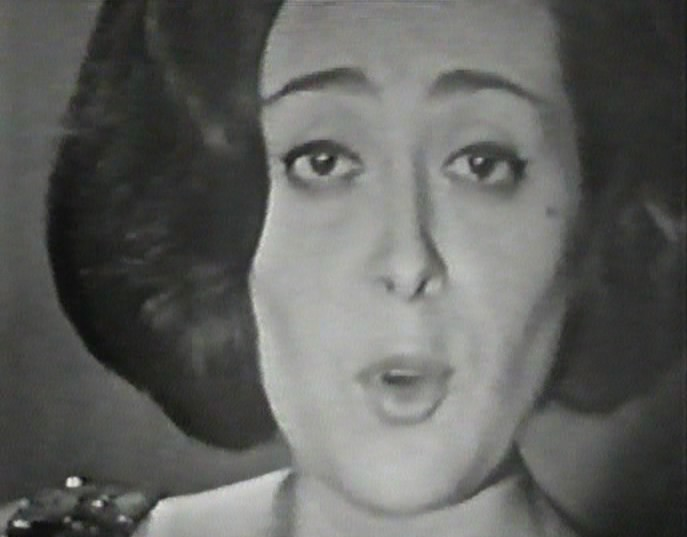
Simone de Oliveira in Naples (1965)

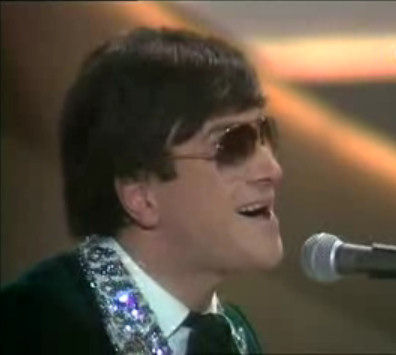
José Cid in The Hague (1980)

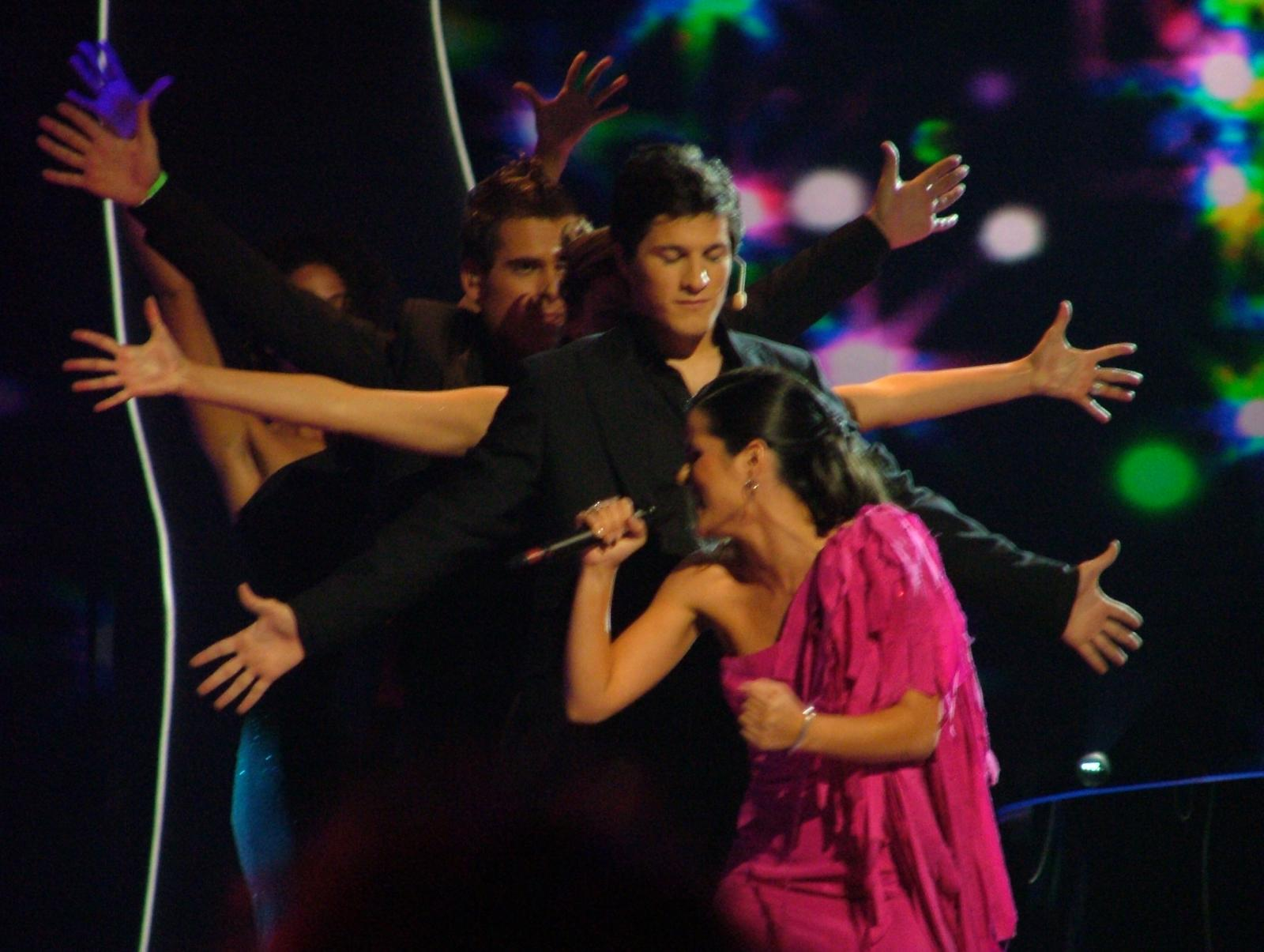
Sofia Vitória in Istanbul (2004)

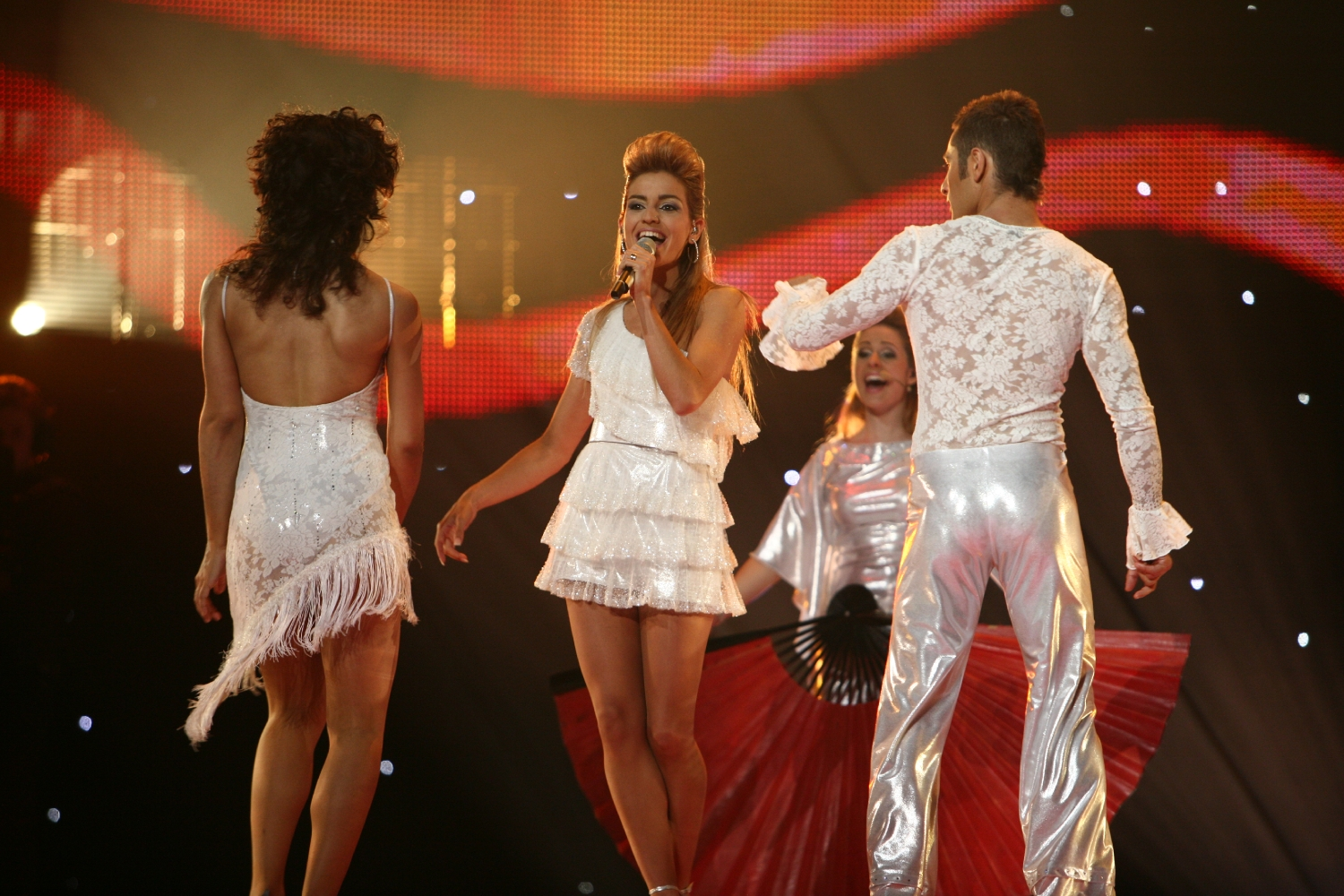
Sabrina in Helsinki (2007)

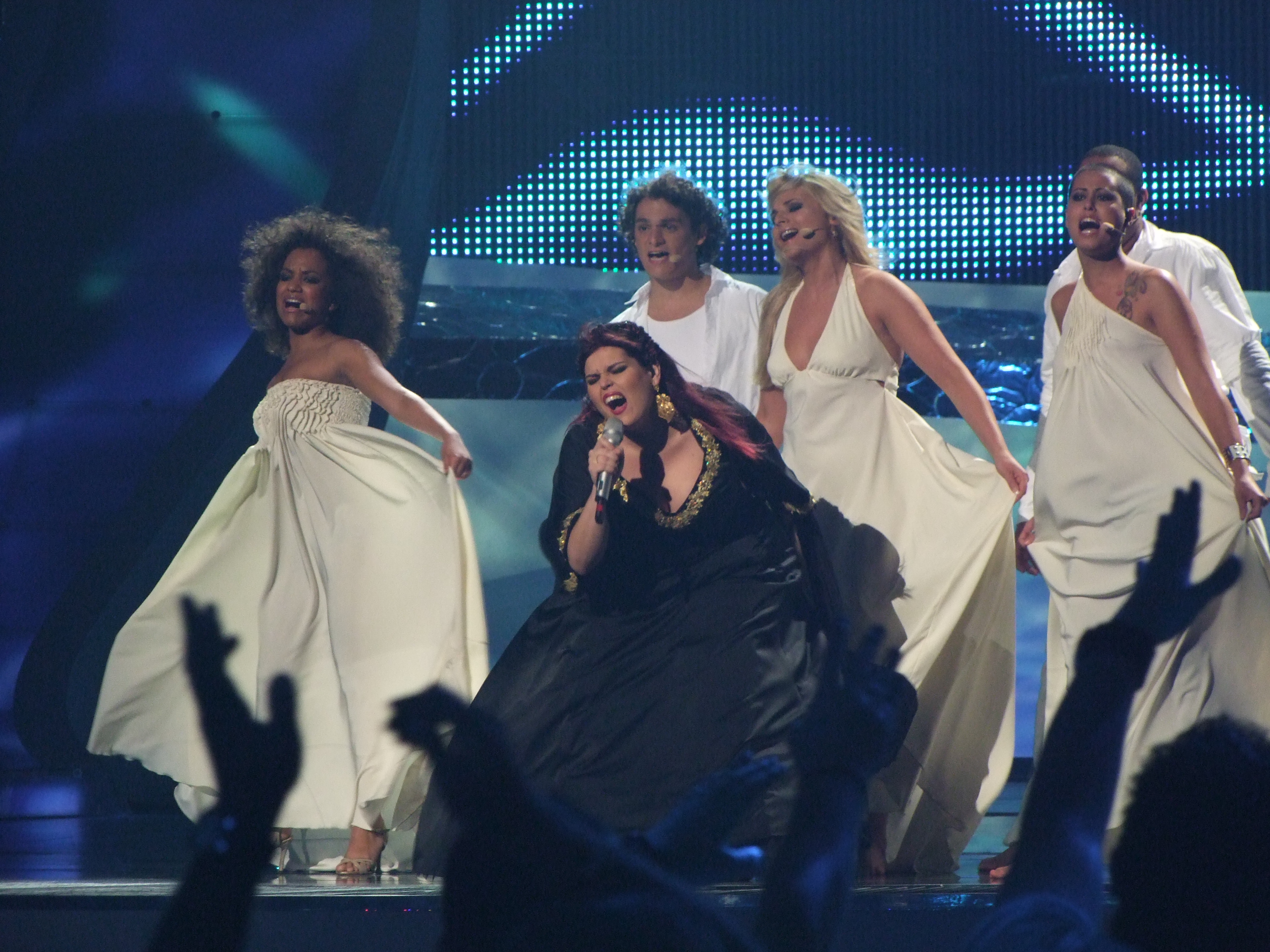
Vânia Fernandes in Belgrade (2008)

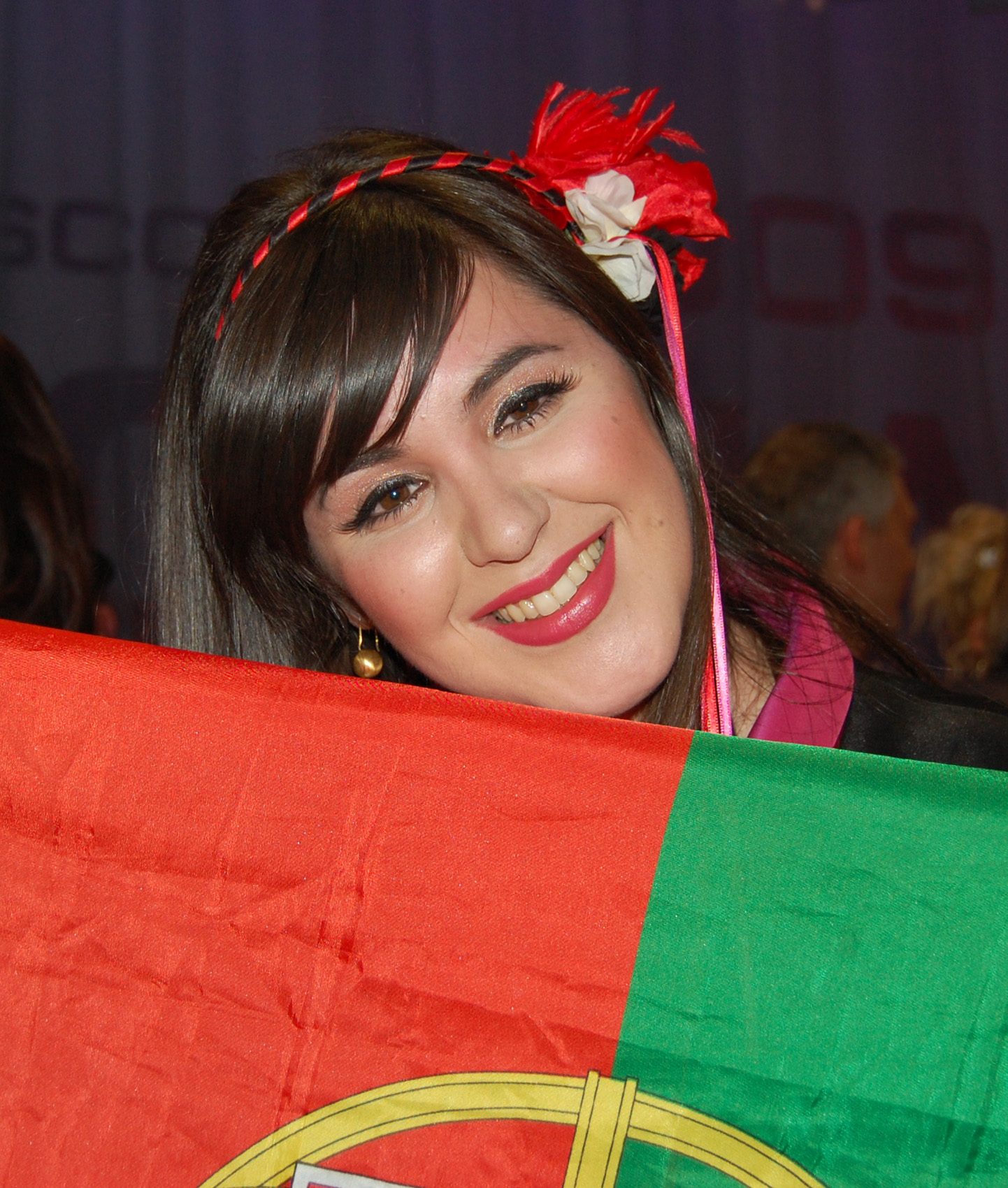
Flor-de-Lis in Moscow (2009)

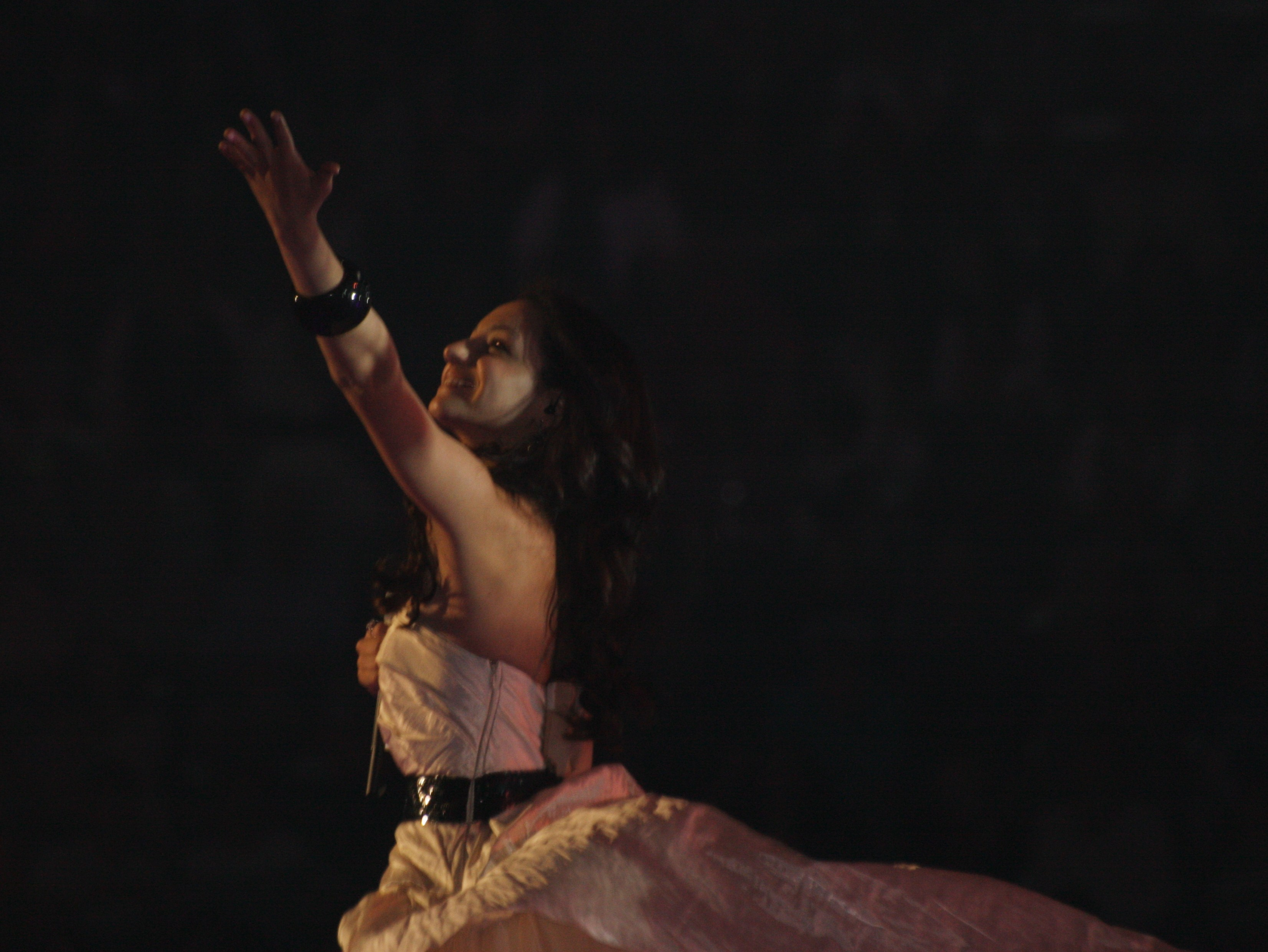
Filipa Azevedo in Oslo (2010)

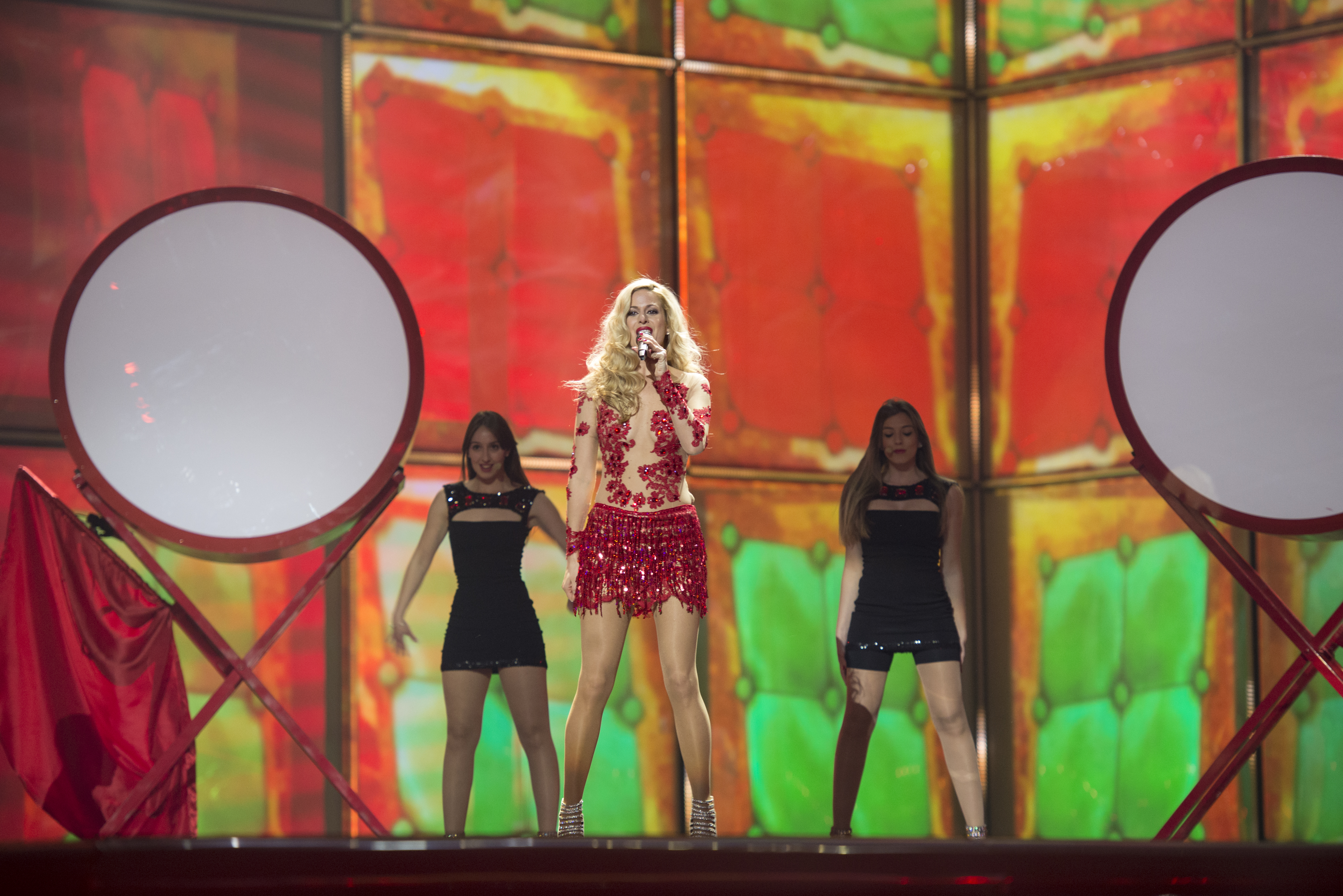
Suzy in Copenhagen (2014)

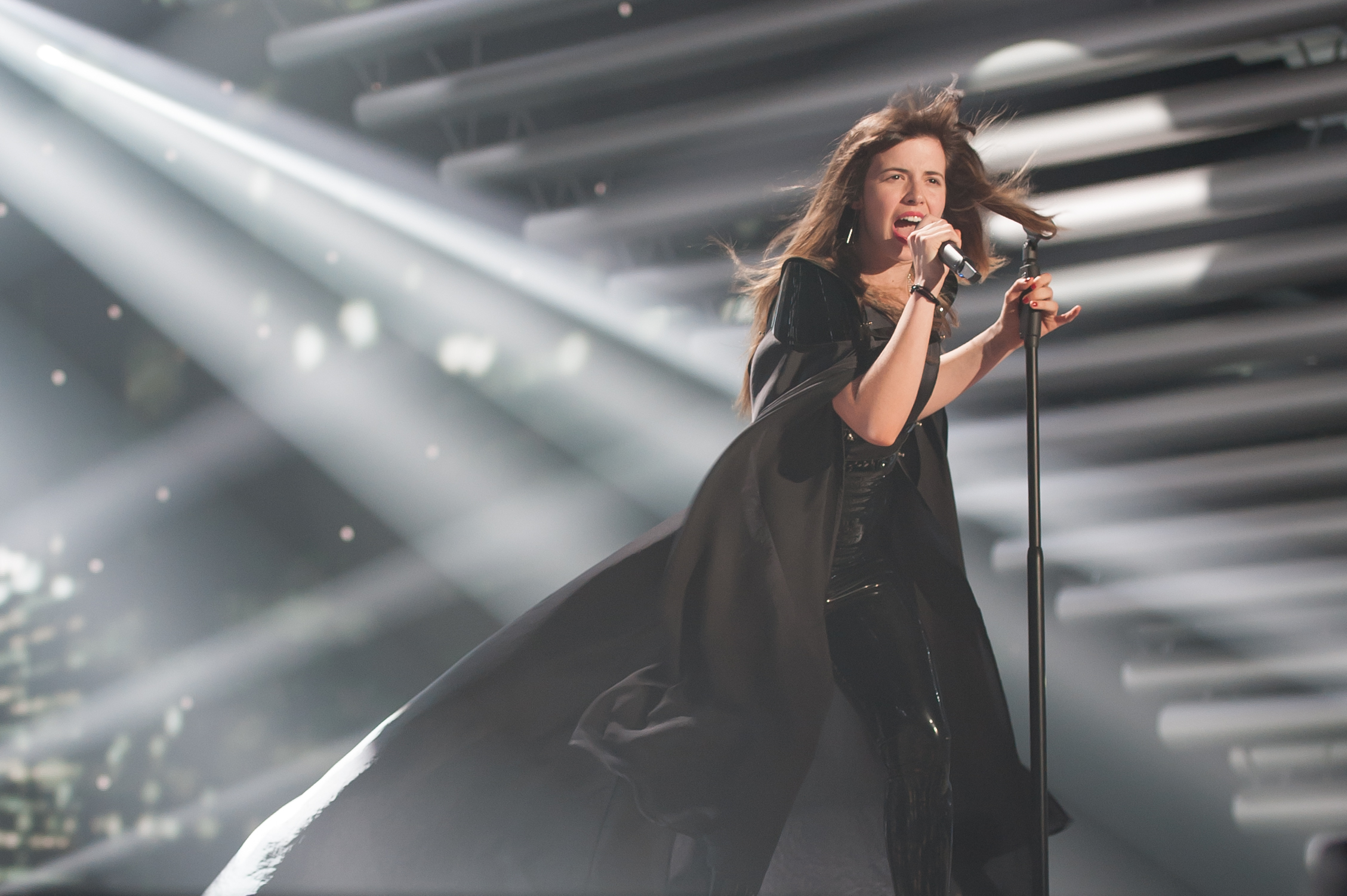
Leonor Andrade in Vienna (2015)

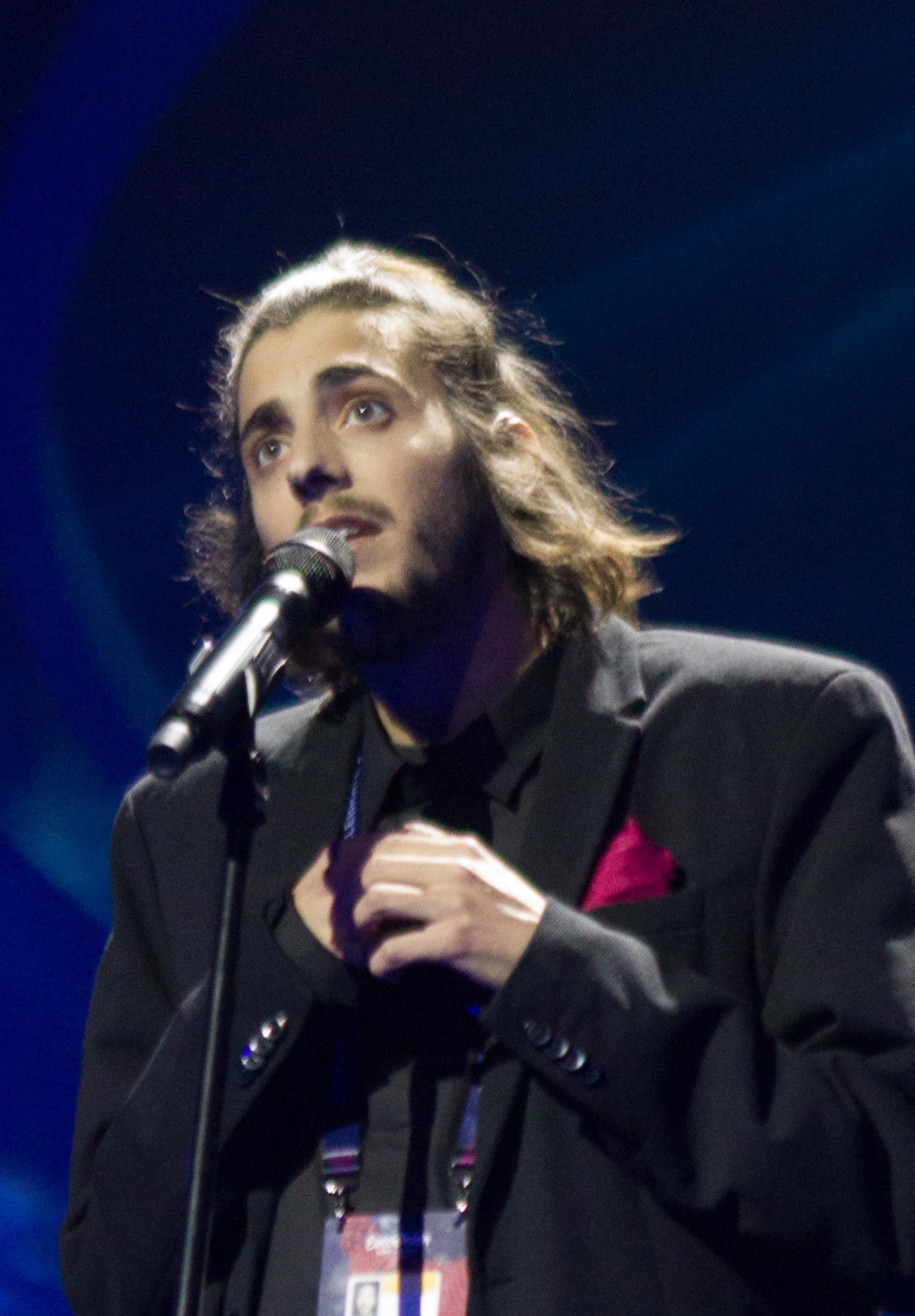
Salvador Sobral in Kyiv (2017)

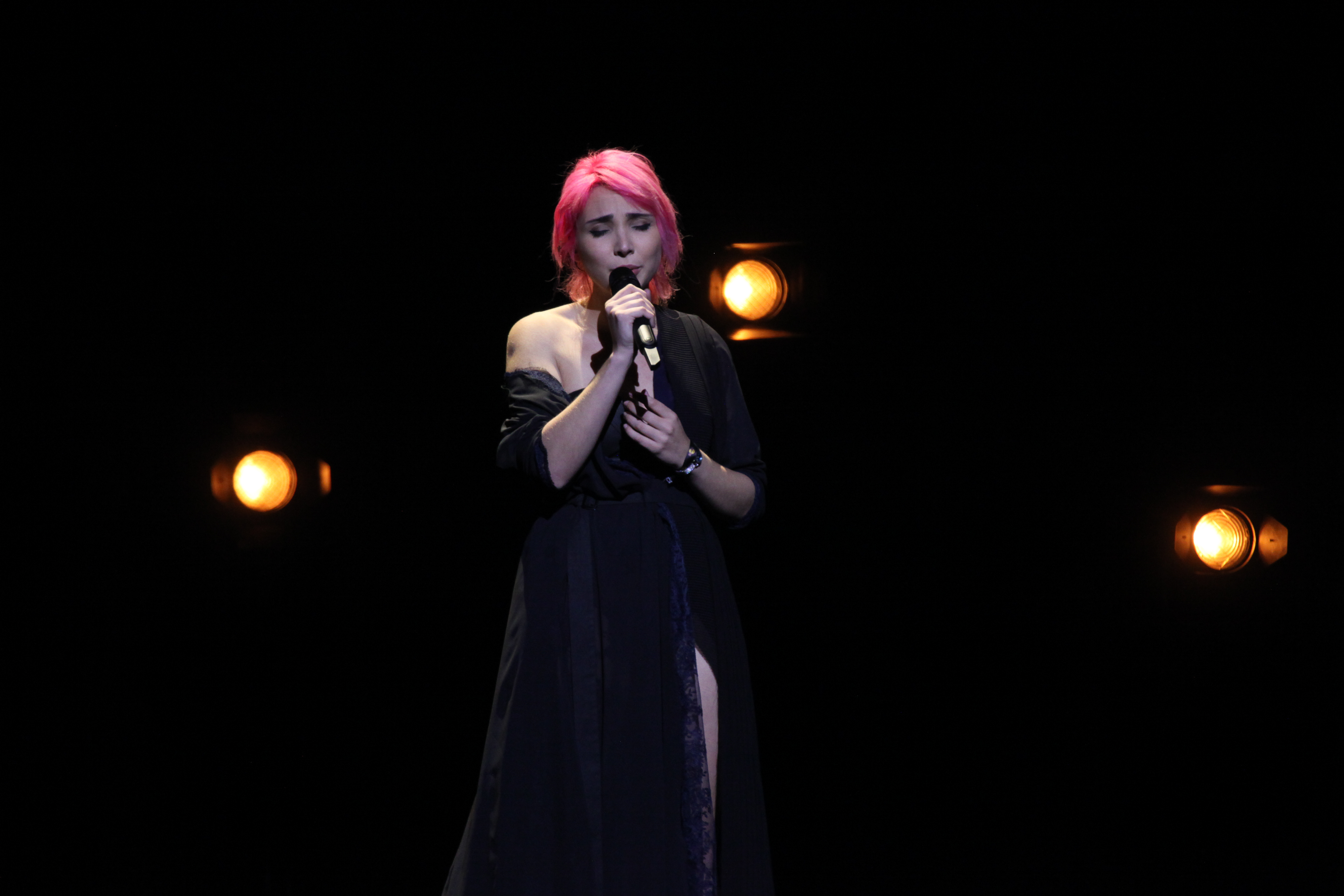
Cláudia Pascoal in Lisbon (2018)

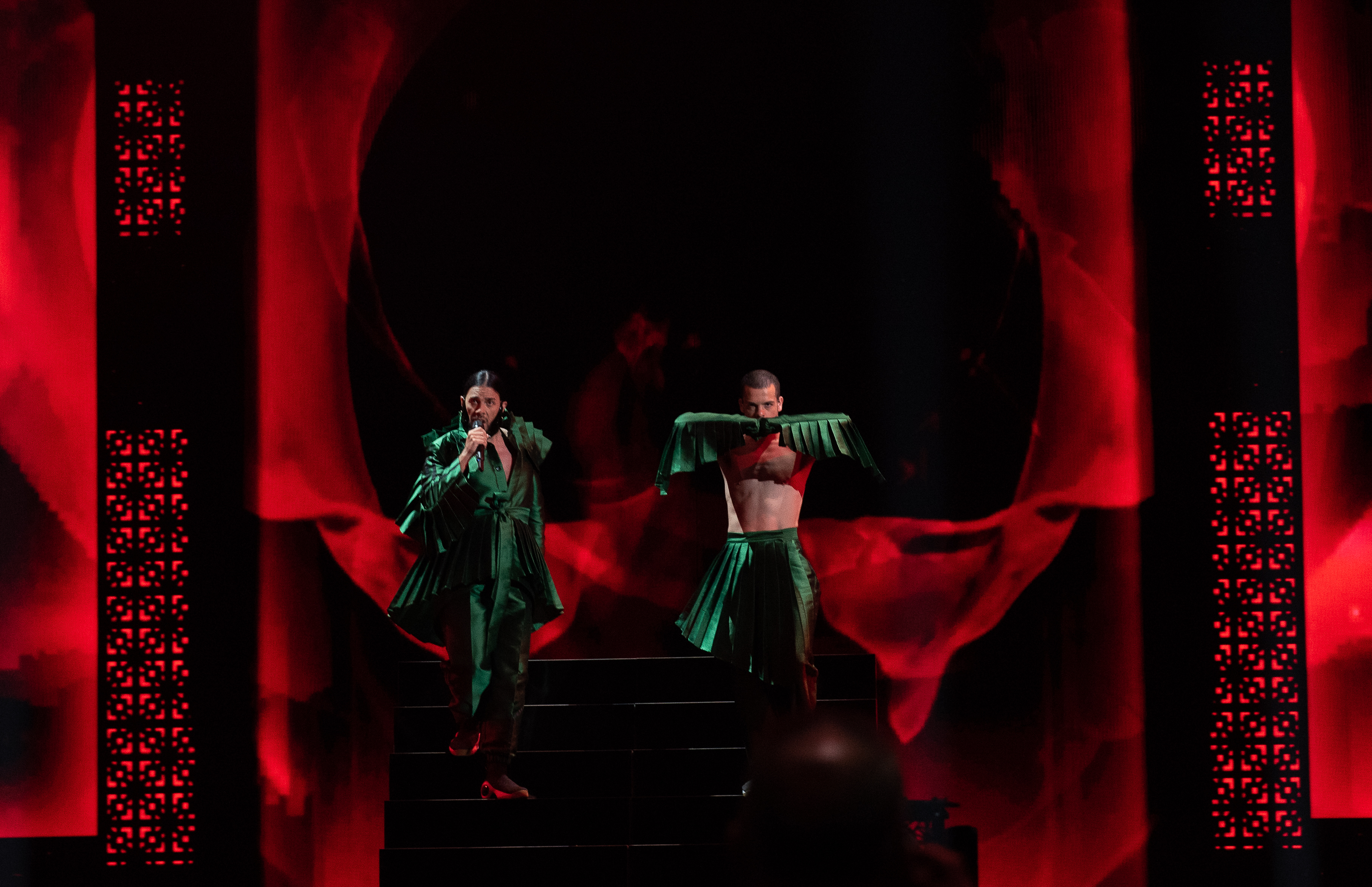
Conan Osíris in Tel Aviv (2019)

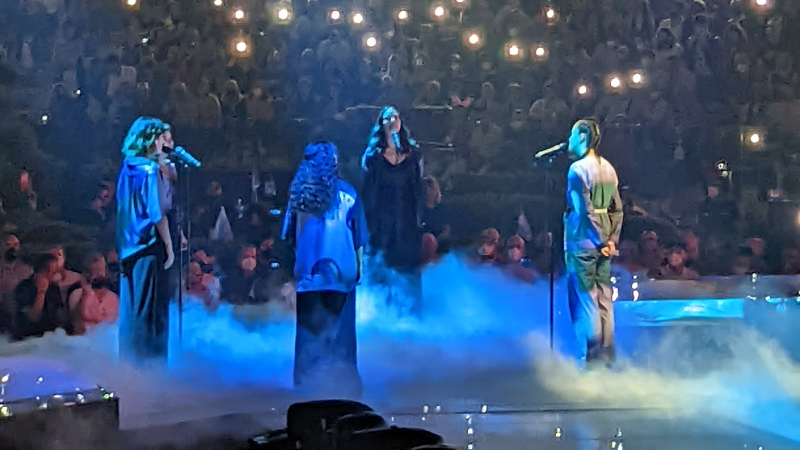
Maro in Turin (2022)

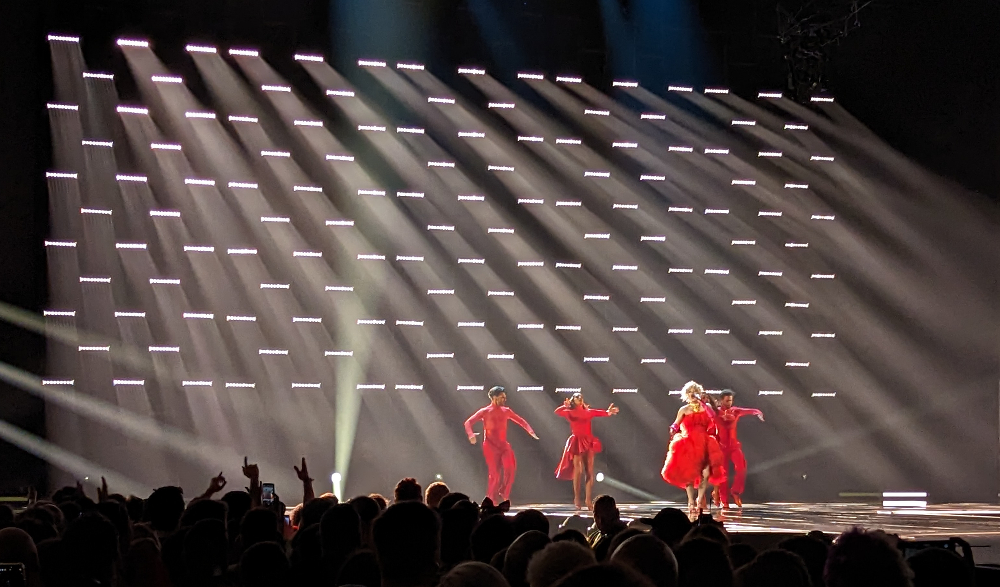
Mimicat in Liverpool (2023)

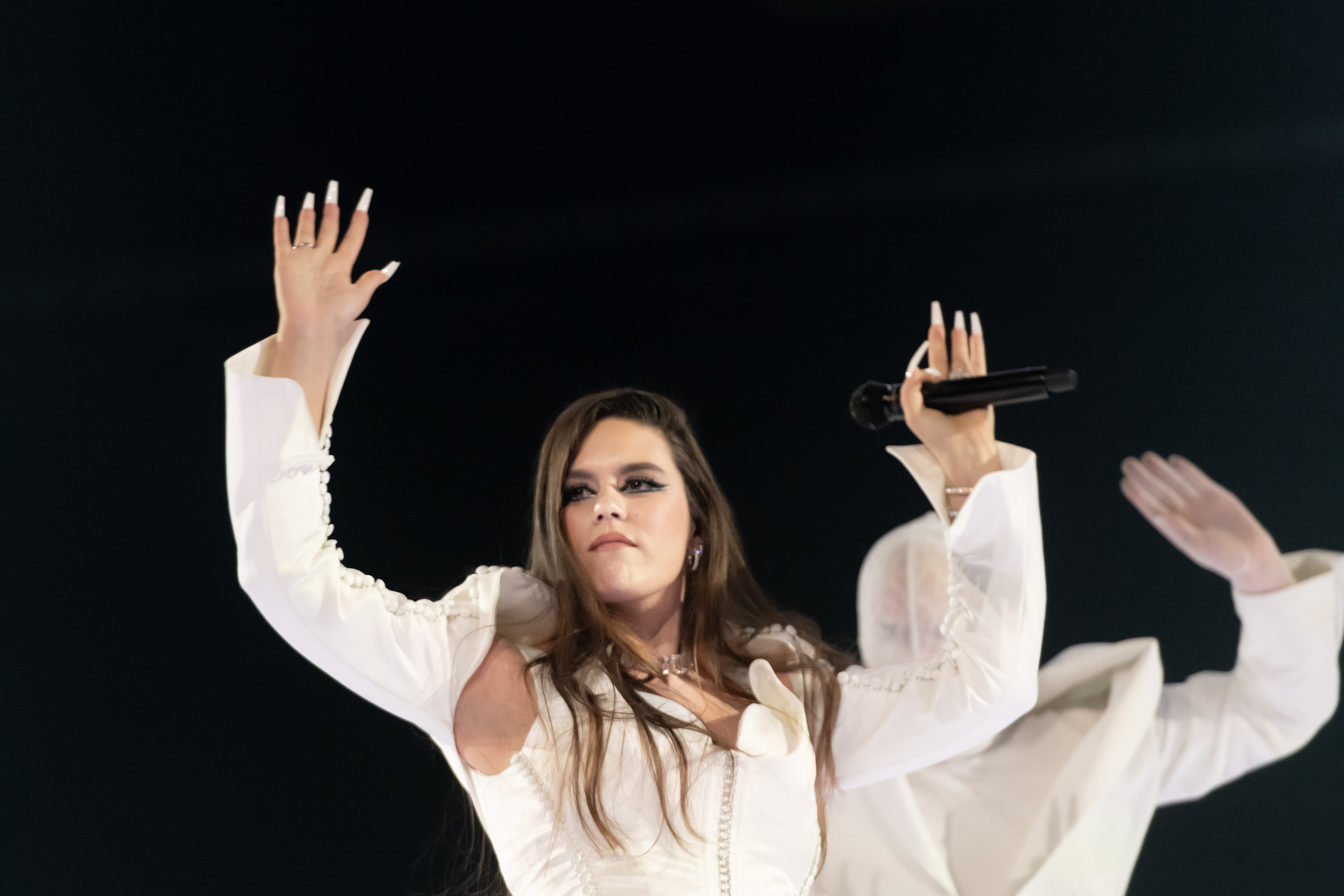
Iolanda in Malmö (2024)

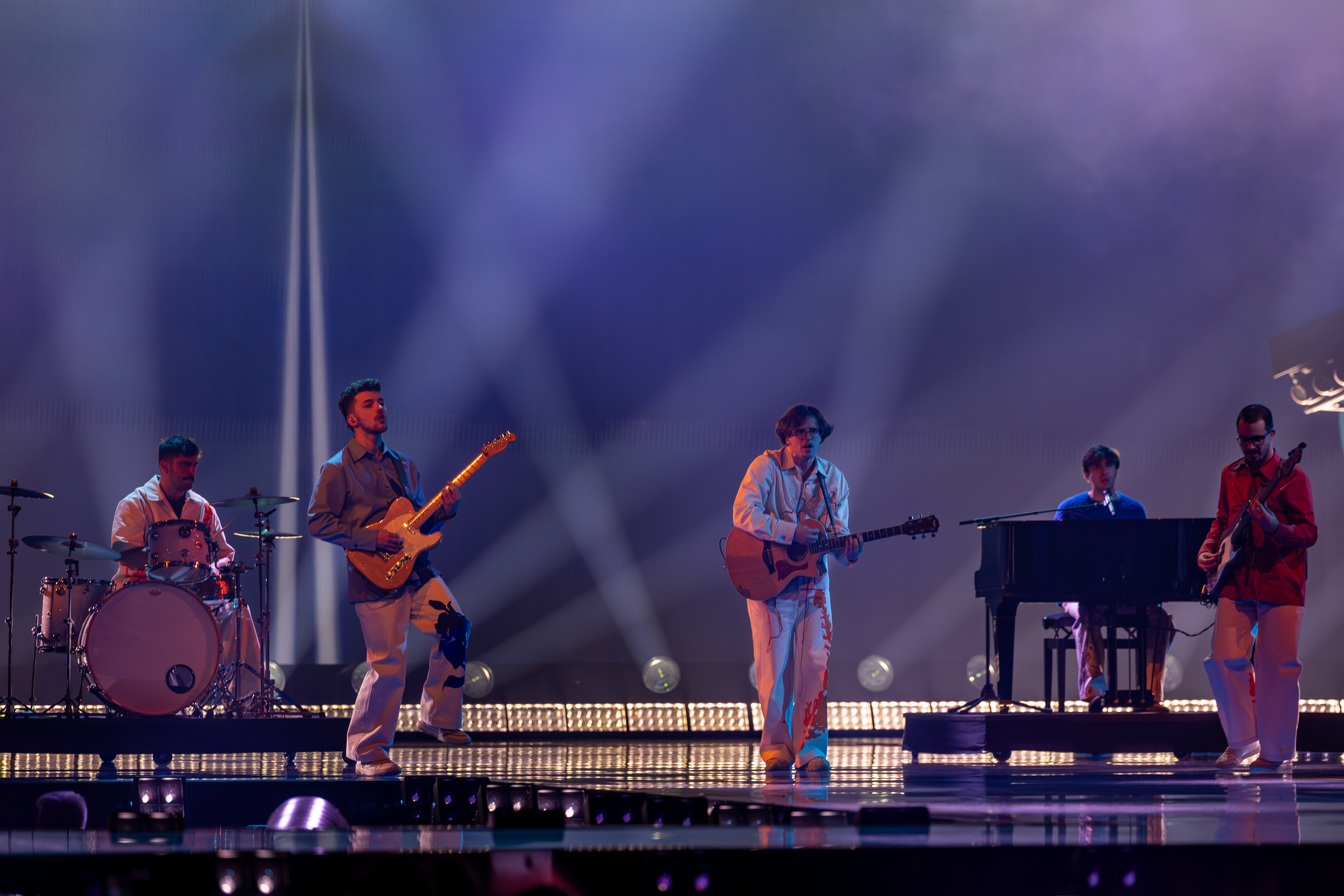
Napa in Basel (2025)

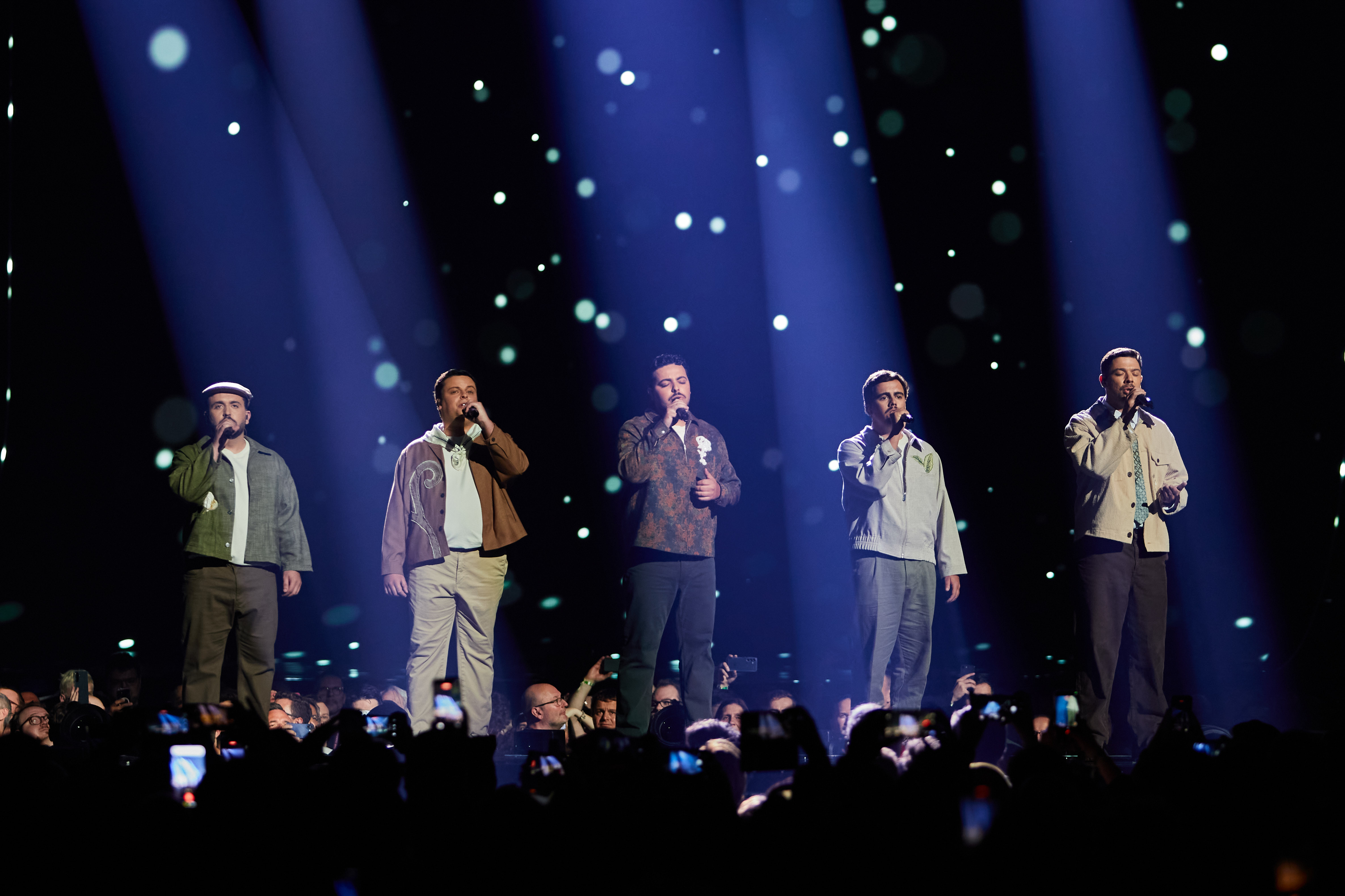
Bandidos do Cante in Vienna (2026)

== See also ==
- List of Eurovision Song Contest presenters
- Portugal in the Junior Eurovision Song Contest – Junior version of the Eurovision Song Contest.
- Portugal in the OTI Festival – A competition organised by the Organização da Televisão Ibero-americana (OTI) between 1972 and 2000.
