= Maria Guinot =

- Born: 20 June 1945; Barreiro, Portugal
- Died: 3 November 2018 (aged 73)
- Genres: Pop
- Occupation: Singer

Maria Guinot (20 June 1945 – 3 November 2018) was a Portuguese singer, best known for her participation in the 1984 Eurovision Song Contest.

== Biography ==
Born in Barreiro, Portugal, Guinot released two EPs, "La mère sans enfant" and "Balada do negro só" in the late 1960s, then took a long break from the music industry. She returned in 1981 performing a song, "Um adeus, um recomeço", in the Portuguese Eurovision selection, Festival da Canção, where she finished third. Her second attempt in Festival da Cançao came in 1984, when her song "Silêncio e tanta gente" ("Silence and So Many People") emerged the winner. Guinot went forward as the Portuguese representative in the 29th Eurovision Song Contest, held in Luxembourg City on 5 May. "Silêncio e tanta gente", a reflective ballad with Guinot accompanying herself on piano, was performed last in the running order, and provided a low-key ending to the contest. It finished in 11th place of the 19 entries.

Following her Eurovision appearance, Guinot continued performing and composing. She has released three albums, and has often collaborated on projects with other musicians.

In 2010 she suffered three strokes and stopped playing the piano. Maria Guinot died on 3 November 2018 from a lung infection at the age of 73.

== Albums discography ==
- 1987: Esta palavra mulher
- 1991: Maria Guinot
- 2004: Tudo passa

Awards and achievements
Preceded by Armando Gama with "Esta balada que te dou"	Portugal in the Eurovision Song Contest; 1984	Succeeded by Adelaide Ferreira with "Penso em ti, eu sei"
