= Sabrina (Portuguese singer) =

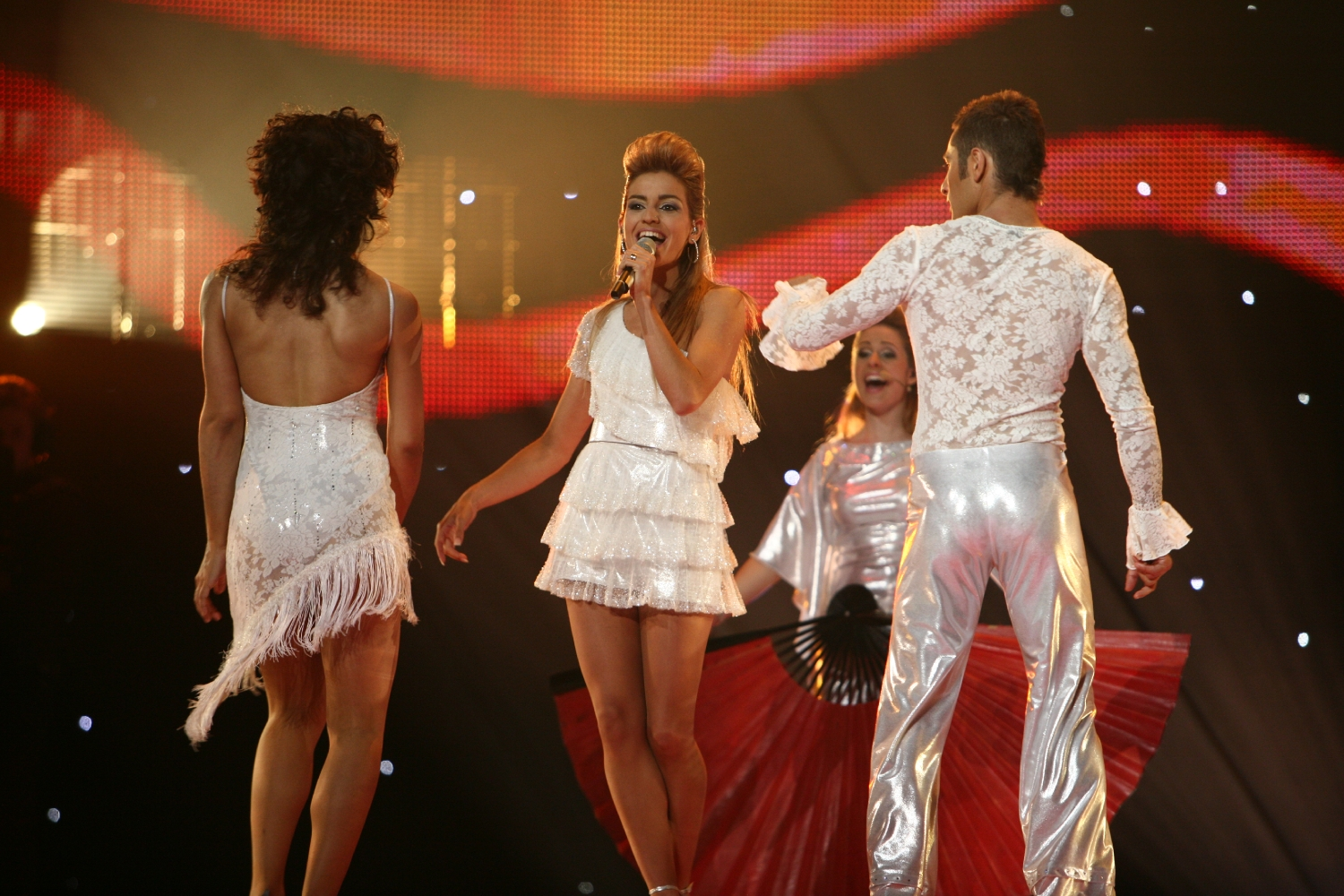
- Sabrina at the Eurovision Song Contest 2007.

Background information
- Also known as: Maria Teresa
- Born: Maria Teresa Villa-Lobos; 30 March 1982 (age 44)
- Origin: Setúbal, Portugal
- Genres: Pop
- Occupation: Singer
- Years active: 2003–present
- Formerly of: Teenagers

Maria Teresa Villa-Lobos (born 30 March 1982), known professionally as Sabrina, is a Portuguese singer from Setúbal. She represented her country and national broadcaster RTP at the Eurovision Song Contest 2007, in Helsinki, Finland, after winning the Festival da Canção, the national selection. Due to Portugal's non-qualification to the final, in 2006, Sabrina performed in the semi-final, finishing 11th thus failing to qualify.

== Biography ==
Sabrina started singing at school and family parties and, at the age of 16, she already had won some karaoke competitions. Her major hobby was playing futsal at the Grupo Desportivo e Recreativo do Bairro do Liceu, achieving a championship runner-up place for local club Vitória de Setúbal.

Professionally, she was part of the third and last line-up of Portuguese girlband Teenagers, from 2003 to 2006, when she planned to start her solo career. In early 2007, with 24 years old, she was selected, through a casting, to participate on RTP's Festival da Canção 2007. Her producer, popular artist Emanuel, proposed her to perform under the alias Sabrina. On 10 March, she won the show with almost twice the votes of the runner-up. The song, called "Dança comigo", represented Portugal at the Eurovision Song Contest 2007 in Helsinki, Finland.

Sabrina performed in position number 17 at the Eurovision Song Contest 2007 semi-final, backed by a mixed pair of dancers and three female singers. The Eurovision version was more Latino-influenced than the version with which she won the Festival da Canção, and the last two choruses were sung in French, Spanish, English and Portuguese. The dance routine was more elaborate also. Sabrina ended up 11th, just 4 points short of qualification, right behind Moldova (to whom incidentally Portugal gave its maximum points). The song's final ranking was 25th out of 42 countries, making "Dança Comigo" the most successful Portuguese entry since 1998, and the second highest Portuguese scorer ever, with 88 points (after the 92 points from 1996). 44 points came from western European countries (8 points from neighbouring Spain), and 36 points from eastern Europe. It was the highest western scoring song in the semi-final. In ESC 2008, she was a spokesperson for RTP.

Along with the Eurovision Song Contest preparations, she was also working on her debut album, produced by Emanuel.

== Personal life ==
She is married to Portuguese football player Orlando Sá, and they have two children.

== See also ==
- Portugal in the Eurovision Song Contest 2007

== Notes ==
Preceded by Nonstop with "Coisas de nada"	Festival da Canção Winner; 2007	Succeeded by Vânia Fernandes with "Senhora do mar (Negras águas)"
Preceded by Nonstop with "Coisas de nada"	Portugal in the Eurovision Song Contest; 2007	Succeeded by Vânia Fernandes with "Senhora do mar (Negras águas)"
