= Portugal in the Eurovision Song Contest 2007 =

- Eurovision Song Contest 2007
- Participating broadcaster: Rádio e Televisão de Portugal (RTP)
- Country: Portugal
- Selection process: Festival da Canção 2007
- Selection date: 10 March 2007

Competing entry
- Song: "Dança comigo"
- Artist: Sabrina
- Songwriters: Emanuel; Tó Maria Vinhas

Placement
- Semi-final result: Failed to qualify (11th)

Participation chronology

Portugal was represented at the Eurovision Song Contest 2007 with the song "Dança comigo", written by Emanuel and Tó Maria Vinhas, and performed by Sabrina. The Portuguese participating broadcaster, Rádio e Televisão de Portugal (RTP), organised the national final Festival da Canção 2007 in order to select its entry for the contest. The competition took place on 10 March 2007 where the winner was selected exclusively by public televoting. "Dança comigo" performed by Sabrina emerged as the winner with 8,874 votes.

Portugal competed in the semi-final of the Eurovision Song Contest which took place on 10 May 2007. Performing during the show in position 17, "Dança comigo" was not announced among the top 10 entries of the semi-final and therefore did not qualify to compete in the final. It was later revealed that Portugal placed eleventh out of the 28 participating countries in the semi-final with 88 points.

== Background ==
Prior to the 2007 contest, Radiotelevisão Portuguesa (RTP) until 2003, and Rádio e Televisão de Portugal (RTP) since 2004, had participated in the Eurovision Song Contest representing Portugal forty times since their first entry in 1964. Their highest placing in the contest was sixth, achieved in 1996 with the song "O meu coração não tem cor" performed by Lúcia Moniz. Following the introduction of semi-finals for the 2004, they had, to this point, yet to feature in a final. Their least successful result has been last place, achieved on three occasions, most recently in 1997 with the song "Antes do adeus" performed by Célia Lawson. They have also received nul points on two occasions; in 1964 and 1997. In 2006, "Coisas de nada" performed by Nonstop failed to qualify to the final.

As part of its duties as participating broadcaster, RTP organises the selection of its entry in the Eurovision Song Contest and broadcasts the event in the country. The broadcaster confirmed its participation in the 2007 contest on 11 December 2006. RTP has traditionally selected its entry for the contest via the music competition Festival da Canção, with exceptions in 1988 and 2005 when the entries were internally selected. Along with its participation confirmation, the broadcaster revealed details regarding its selection procedure and announced the organization of Festival da Canção 2007 in order to select its entry.

== Before Eurovision ==
=== Festival da Canção 2007 ===
Festival da Canção 2007 was the 43rd edition of Festival da Canção organised by RTP to select its entry for the Eurovision Song Contest 2007. Ten entries competed in the competition which took place on 10 March 2007 at Sala Tejo of the Pavilhão Atlantico in Lisbon. The show was hosted by Isabel Angelino and Jorge Gabriel and broadcast on RTP1 and RTP Internacional as well as online via the broadcaster's official website rtp.pt.

==== Competing entries ====
Ten producers were invited by RTP for the competition. The producers worked in coordination with their selected composers and performers on the songs which were required to be created and submitted in Portuguese (with exceptions for a small part of the song which could be in any other language) by 19 February 2007 in its final versions. The selected producers were revealed on 12 February 2007, while the competing artists were revealed on 15 February 2007. Among the producers was former Eurovision entrant José Cid, who represented Portugal in 1980 and in 1998 (the latter as part of the group Alma Lusa).

Artist	Song	Songwriter(s)	Producer
Diogo T.	"Chega, foi demais!"	Ramón Galarza	
Filipa Cardoso and Edmundo Vieira	"Desta vez"	Nuno Carvalho, João Matos, Ricardo Ferreira, Rui Rocha	Nuno Carvalho
Henrique Feist and Vanessa	"Além do sonho"	Nuno Feist, Nuno Marques da Silva	Nuno Feist
Luiz e a Lata	"Ai pode"	Luís Caracol, Célia Aldegalegan	Elvis Veiguinha
Marta Plantier and Os Corvos	"Piano, Piano"	Luís Jardim	Luís Jardim
Melo D. and Elaisa	"Será cedo?"	João Barbosa, João Silva Gomes, Kalaf Ângelo	João Barbosa
Sabrina	"Dança comigo (vem ser feliz)"	Emanuel, Tó Maria Vinhas	Emanuel
Teresa Radamanto	"Ai de quem nunca cantou"	Fernando Martins, Alexandra Valentim, Fernando Abrantes, Teresa Radamanto, Isabella Allard, João Baião	Fernando Martins
TribUrbana	"Dá-me a Lua"	António Avelar de Pinho, Luís Oliveira, Agir	Luís Oliveira
Zé P.	"Na ilha dos sonhos"	José Cid, Zé P.	José Cid

==== Final ====
The final took place on 10 March 2007. Ten entries competed and the winner, "Dança comigo (vem ser feliz)" performed by Sabrina, was selected solely by a public televote. In addition to the performances of the competing entries, Jorge Mourato together with Marco Horácio, Carlos Coincas, Vânia Oliveira and Sofia Froes, and Kátia Moreira (who represented Portugal in 2006 as part of the band Nonstop) performed as the interval acts.

Final – 10 March 2007
R/O	Artist	Song	Televote	Place
1	Filipa Cardoso and Edmundo Vieira	"Desta vez"	2,396	6
2	Marta Plantier and Os Corvos	"Piano, Piano"	2,182	7
3	Luiz e a Lata	"Ai pode"	2,013	8
4	Sabrina	"Dança comigo (vem ser feliz)"	8,874	1
5	Diogo T.	"Chega, foi demais!"	386	10
6	TribUrbana	"Dá-me a Lua"	3,046	4
7	Melo D. and Elaisa	"Será cedo?"	1,364	9
8	Teresa Radamanto	"Ai de quem nunca cantou"	4,757	2
9	Henrique Feist and Vanessa	"Além do sonho"	3,730	3
10	Zé P.	"Na ilha dos sonhos"	3,013	5

== At Eurovision ==
According to Eurovision rules, all nations with the exceptions of the host country, the "Big Four" (France, Germany, Spain and the United Kingdom), and the ten highest placed finishers in the 2006 contest are required to qualify from the semi-final on 10 May 2007 in order to compete for the final on 12 May 2007; the top ten countries from the semi-final progress to the final. On 12 March 2007, a special allocation draw was held which determined the running order for the semi-final and Portugal was set to perform in position 17, following the entry from Czech Republic and before the entry from Macedonia.

In Portugal, the two shows were broadcast on RTP1 and RTP Internacional with commentary by Isabel Angelino and Jorge Gabriel. RTP appointed Francisco Mendes as its spokesperson to announce the Portuguese votes during the final.

=== Semi-final ===
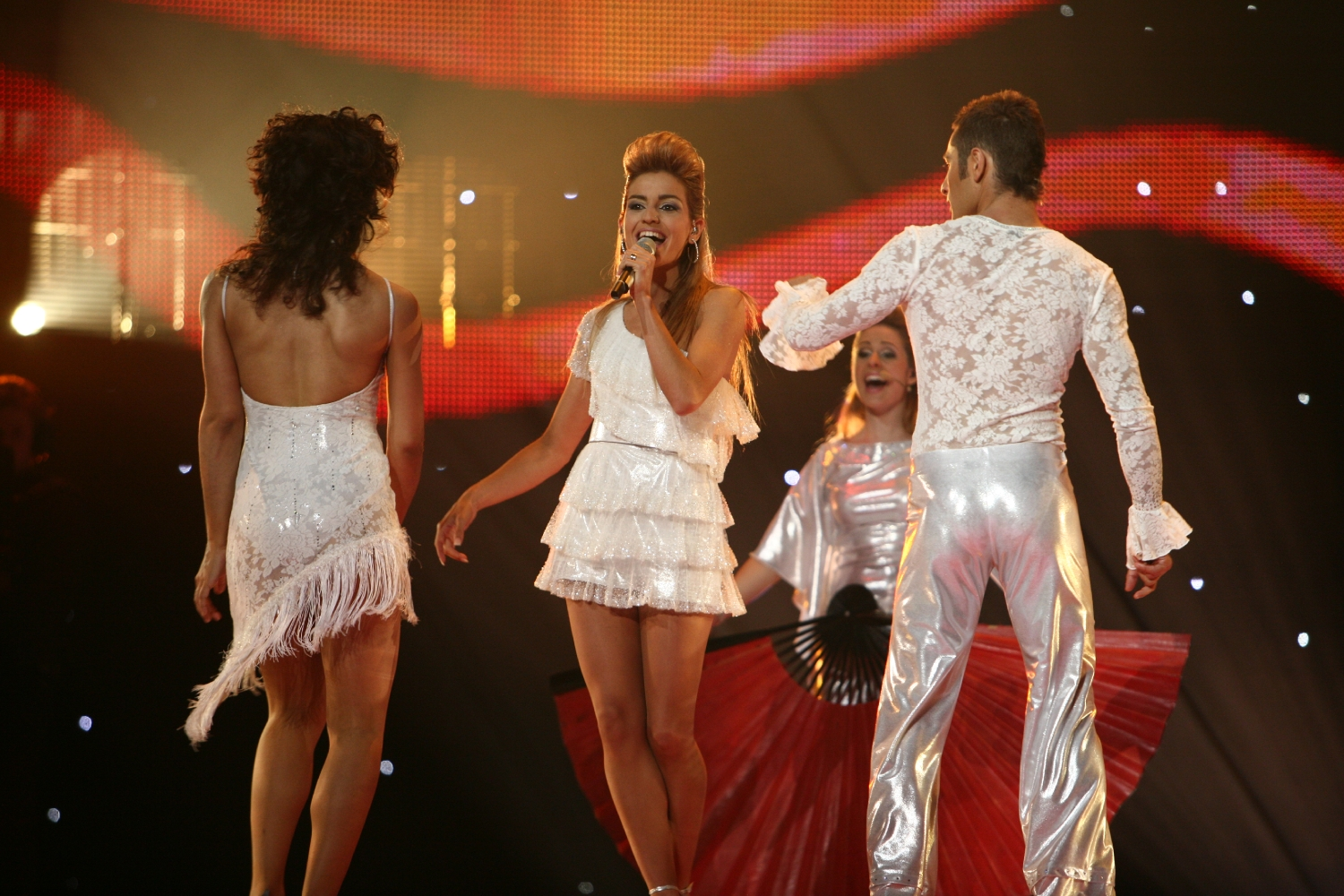
Sabrina during a rehearsal before the semi-final

Sabrina took part in technical rehearsals on 14 and 18 May, followed by dress rehearsals on 21 and 22 May. The Portuguese performance featured Sabrina wearing a short white dress performing a dance routine with five dancers also dressed in silver, three of them also providing backing vocals and making use of huge reversible fans which held in formation at times throughout the performance: Ana Ferreira, Ana Gonçalves, Andreia, Cláudia Soares, and Nélson Araújo. The LED screens displayed a sea of swirling reds.

At the end of the show, Portugal was not announced among the top 10 entries in the semi-final and therefore failed to qualify to compete in the final. It was later revealed that Portugal placed eleventh in the semi-final, receiving a total of 88 points.

=== Voting ===
Below is a breakdown of points awarded to Portugal and awarded by Portugal in the semi-final and grand final of the contest. The nation awarded its 12 points to Moldova in the semi-final and to Ukraine in the final of the contest.

==== Points awarded to Portugal ====
Points awarded to Portugal (Semi-final)
Score	Country
12 points	Andorra
10 points	France; Poland
8 points	Spain; Switzerland
7 points	Belarus; Germany; Moldova
6 points	Armenia
5 points	
4 points	Netherlands
3 points	Belgium; Latvia
2 points	
1 point	Cyprus; Serbia; Slovenia

==== Points awarded by Portugal ====
Points awarded by Portugal (Semi-final)
Score	Country
12 points	Moldova
10 points	Hungary
8 points	Latvia
7 points	Slovenia
6 points	Andorra
5 points	Bulgaria
4 points	Serbia
3 points	Netherlands
2 points	Norway
1 point	Belarus

Points awarded by Portugal (Final)
Score	Country
12 points	Ukraine
10 points	Moldova
8 points	Spain
7 points	Romania
6 points	Bulgaria
5 points	Serbia
4 points	Russia
3 points	Slovenia
2 points	Hungary
1 point	Belarus
