= Adelaide Ferreira =

Portuguese singer

- Born: Maria Adelaide Mengas Matafome Ferreira; 23 September 1959 (age 67); Minde, Alcanena, Portugal
- Genres: Pop, rock
- Occupations: Actress, singer, songwriter, television personality
- Instrument: Vocals
- Years active: 1979–present

Maria Adelaide Mengas Matafome Ferreira (born 23 September 1959) is a Portuguese singer.

She started as a rock singer with the hit "Baby suicida" in 1981. After that, she has sung ballads. She represented Portugal in the OTI Festival 1984 with the song "Vem no meu sonho", placing second. She won the Festival RTP da Canção 1985 with the song "Penso em ti (Eu sei)", which allowed her to represent Portugal in the Eurovision Song Contest 1985 with the song, placing 18th with 9 points.

She is also an actress on television having roles in many Portuguese soap operas.

== Discography ==
=== Albums ===
- Entre Um Coco e Um Adeus (Between a Coconut and a Goodbye) (LP, Polygram,1986)
- Amantes Imortais/Fast And Far (2LP, MBP, 1989)
- O Realizador está Louco (The Director is Crazy) (CD, Vidisco, 1996)
- Só Baladas (Only ballads) (Compilação, BMG, 1998)
- Sentidos (Senses) (CD, BMG, 2000)
- Outro Sol (Another Sun) (BB3, 2001)
- O Olhar da Serpente (2002) "The Look of the Snake"
- Adelaide Ferreira,(2004), Universal Music Portugal
- Mais Forte que a Paixão, (2006), Farol (Stronger than the passion)
- O Melhor de Adelaide Ferreira (2008), (The best of Adelaide Ferreira), a compilation

=== Singles ===
- Meu Amor Vamos Conversar os Dois (Single, Nova, 1978) (My love let's talk)
- Espero por Ti/Alegria Em Flor (Single, Nova, 1980) (Wait For You/Joy in bloom)
- Baby Suicida/A Tua Noite (Single, Vadeca, 1981) (Suicidal baby/Your night)
- Bichos/Trânsito (Single, Vadeca, 1981) (Critters/Transit)
- Não Não Não/Danada do Rock'n'Roll (Máxi, Polygram, 1983) (No No No/Damn Rock and Roll)
- Quero-Te, Choro-te, Odeio-Te, Adoro-te (Single, Polygram, 1984) (I want you, Crying you, Hate you, Love you)
- Penso em Ti, Eu Sei/Vem No Meu Sonho (Single, Polygram, 1985) (I think of you, I know/Comes in my dream)

Awards and achievements
Preceded by José Cid with "Uma lagrima"	Portugal in the OTI Festival; 1984	Succeeded by Jorge Fernando with "Um ano depois"
Preceded by Maria Guinot with "Silêncio e tanta gente"	Portugal in the Eurovision Song Contest; 1985	Succeeded by Dora with "Não sejas mau para mim"
