= Portugal in the Eurovision Song Contest 2004 =

- Eurovision Song Contest 2004
- Participating broadcaster: Rádio e Televisão de Portugal (RTP)
- Country: Portugal
- Selection process: Festival da Canção 2004
- Selection date: 25 January 2004

Competing entry
- Song: "Foi magia"
- Artist: Sofia Vitória
- Songwriters: Paulo Neves

Placement
- Semi-final result: Failed to qualify (15th)

Participation chronology

Portugal was represented at the Eurovision Song Contest 2004 with the song "Foi magia", written by Paulo Neves, and performed by Sofia Vitória. The Portuguese participating broadcaster, Rádio e Televisão de Portugal (RTP), organised the national final Festival da Canção 2004 in order to select its entry for the contest. The competition consisted of two shows on 18 and 25 January 2004 where the winner was selected exclusively by public televoting. "Foi magia" performed by Sofia Vitória emerged as the winner with 39,072 votes.

Portugal competed in the semi-final of the Eurovision Song Contest which took place on 12 May 2004. Performing during the show in position 7, "Foi magia" was not announced among the top 10 entries of the semi-final and therefore did not qualify to compete in the final. It was later revealed that Portugal placed fifteenth out of the 22 participating countries in the semi-final with 38 points.

== Background ==
Prior to the 2004 contest, Radiotelevisão Portuguesa (RTP) had participated in the Eurovision Song Contest representing Portugal thirty-seven times since its first entry in 1964. Its highest placing in the contest was sixth, achieved in 1996 with the song "O meu coração não tem cor" performed by Lúcia Moniz. Its least successful result has been last place, which it has achieved on three occasions, most recently in 1997 with the song "Antes do adeus" performed by Célia Lawson. The Portuguese entry has also received nul points on two occasions; in 1964 and 1997. In 2003, it placed twenty-second with the song "Deixa-me sonhar" performed by Rita Guerra.

After a restructuring that led to the incorporation of the former RTP into the current Rádio e Televisão de Portugal (RTP) on early 2004, it was the latter who participated in the 2004 contest. As part of its duties as participating broadcaster, RTP organised the selection of its entry in the Eurovision Song Contest and broadcast the event in the country. RTP confirmed its participation in the 2004 contest on 29 September 2003. RTP has traditionally selected its entry for the contest via the music competition Festival da Canção, with an exception in 1988 when it selected its entry internally. Along with its participation confirmation, RTP revealed details regarding its selection procedure and announced that the selection of the entry would involve the reality singing competition Operação Triunfo.

== Before Eurovision ==
=== Festival da Canção 2004 ===
Festival da Canção 2004 was the 41st edition of Festival da Canção that selected the Portuguese entry for the Eurovision Song Contest 2004. Three entries competed in the competition that consisted of two shows held during the second season of the reality singing competition Operação Triunfo on 18 and 25 January 2004. Both shows took place at the Endemol TV Studios in Mem-Martins, hosted by Catarina Furtado and broadcast on RTP1 and RTP Internacional.

==== Competing entries ====
The top three contestants of the second season of Operação Triunfo: Francisco Andrade, Gonçalo Medeiros, and Sofia Vitória, were selected for the competition and were each assigned a potential Eurovision Song Contest song selected by a jury panel consisting of lyricist Rosa Lobato de Faria, Carlos Mendes (who represented Portugal in 1968 and in 1972), journalist and music critic Nuno Galopim and producers José Marinho and Nuno Figueira from 300 submissions received by Portuguese composers. The competing entries were revealed on 11 January 2004.

| Artist | Song | Songwriter(s) |
|---|---|---|
| Francisco Andrade | "Caminhos singelos" | Múcio Sá and Rosete Caixinha |
| Gonçalo Medeiros | "Novo e clássico" | Américo Faria |
| Sofia Vitória | "Foi magia" | Paulo Neves |

==== Final ====
The final consisted of two shows on 18 and 25 January 2004. The first show on 18 January was an introductory show where the three entries were presented to the public and past Portuguese representatives Anabela (1993) and Lúcia Moniz (1996) performed as the interval acts. The public was able to vote for their favourite songs until the second show on 25 January, during which the winner, "Foi magia" performed by Sofia Vitória, was selected solely by the public televote. Pedro Abrunhosa performed as the interval act and each of the competing artists performed a cover version of a former Portuguese Eurovision song in a duet with its original performer.

Final – 25 January 2004
| Artist | R/O | Song | R/O | Duet | Televote | Place |
|---|---|---|---|---|---|---|
| Francisco Andrade | 1 | "Caminhos singelos" | 4 | "Sol de inverno" (with Simone de Oliveira) | 31,003 | 3 |
| Sofia Vitória | 2 | "Foi magia" | 5 | "Oração" (with António Calvário) | 39,072 | 1 |
| Gonçalo Medeiros | 3 | "Novo e clássico" | 6 | "A festa da vida" (with Carlos Mendes) | 31,899 | 2 |

Detailed Televoting Results
| R/O | Song | Azores | Madeira | North | Central | Algarve | Greater Porto | Greater Lisbon | International | Mobiles | Total |
|---|---|---|---|---|---|---|---|---|---|---|---|
| 1 | "Caminhos singelos" | 458 | 539 | 684 | 439 | 421 | 1,755 | 3,599 | 5,015 | 18,093 | 31,003 |
| 2 | "Foi magia" | 1,766 | 786 | 732 | 1,706 | 1,003 | 1,677 | 6,145 | 4,770 | 20,487 | 39,072 |
| 3 | "Novo e clássico" | 1,433 | 1,267 | 753 | 701 | 429 | 602 | 3,155 | 2,635 | 20,924 | 31,899 |

== At Eurovision ==
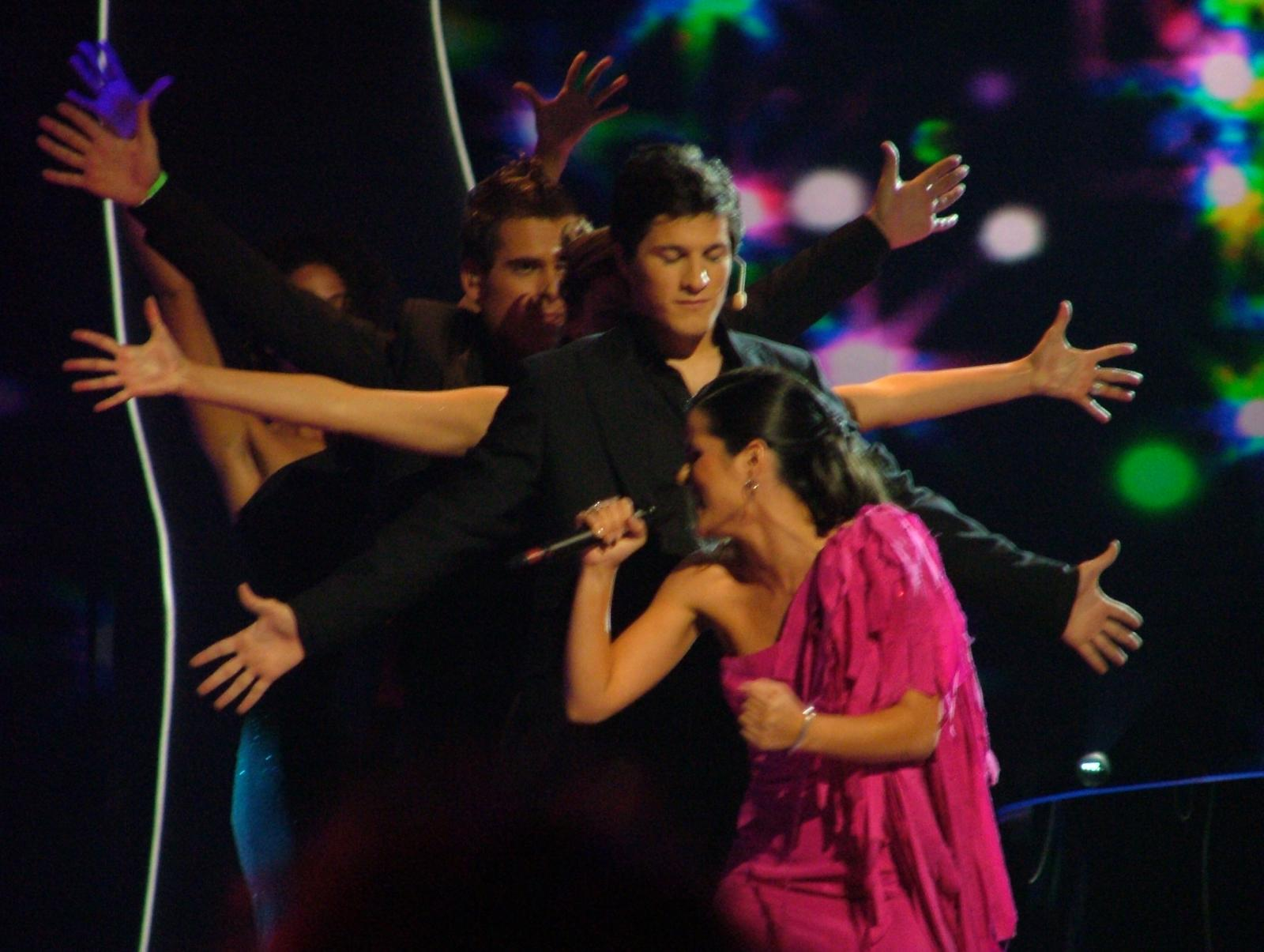
Sofia Vitória during a rehearsal before the semi-final

It was announced that the competition's format would be expanded to include a semi-final in 2004. According to the rules, all nations with the exceptions of the host country, the "Big Four" (France, Germany, Spain, and the United Kingdom), and the ten highest placed finishers in the 2003 contest are required to qualify from the semi-final on 12 May 2004 in order to compete for the final on 15 May 2004; the top ten countries from the semi-final progress to the final. On 23 March 2004, a special allocation draw was held which determined the running order for the semi-final and Portugal was set to perform in position 7, following the entry from Andorra and before the entry from Malta. At the end of the semi-final, Portugal was not announced among the top 10 entries in the semi-final and therefore failed to qualify to compete in the final. It was later revealed that Portugal placed fifteenth in the semi-final, receiving a total of 38 points.

In Portugal, the two shows were broadcast on RTP1 and RTP Internacional with commentary by Eládio Clímaco. RPT appointed Isabel Angelino as its spokesperson to announce the Portuguese votes during the final.

=== Voting ===
Below is a breakdown of points awarded to Portugal and awarded by Portugal in the semi-final and grand final of the contest. The nation awarded its 12 points to Ukraine in the semi-final and to Spain in the final of the contest.

Following the release of the televoting figures by the EBU after the conclusion of the competition, it was revealed that a total of 12,467 televotes were cast in Portugal during the two shows: 3,870 votes during the semi-final and 8,597 votes during the final.

==== Points awarded to Portugal ====
Points awarded to Portugal (Semi-final)
| Score | Country |
|---|---|
| 12 points | Andorra |
| 10 points | |
| 8 points | Romania |
| 7 points | Switzerland |
| 6 points | Spain |
| 5 points | |
| 4 points | Belgium |
| 3 points | |
| 2 points | |
| 1 point | Monaco |

==== Points awarded by Portugal ====
Points awarded by Portugal (Semi-final)
| Score | Country |
|---|---|
| 12 points | Ukraine |
| 10 points | Serbia and Montenegro |
| 8 points | Greece |
| 7 points | Israel |
| 6 points | Netherlands |
| 5 points | Estonia |
| 4 points | Malta |
| 3 points | Cyprus |
| 2 points | Albania |
| 1 point | Croatia |

Points awarded by Portugal (Final)
| Score | Country |
|---|---|
| 12 points | Spain |
| 10 points | Ukraine |
| 8 points | Germany |
| 7 points | Serbia and Montenegro |
| 6 points | Greece |
| 5 points | Sweden |
| 4 points | Romania |
| 3 points | Cyprus |
| 2 points | France |
| 1 point | Malta |
