= O Realizador está Louco =

Studio album by Adelaide Ferreira
- Released: Portugal 2000
- Genre: Pop Portugês
- Length: CD 40:07
- Label: Vidisco

Adelaide Ferreira chronology
Amantes e Mortais / Fast and Far (1989)	O Realizador está Louco (2000)	Sentidos (2000)

O Realizador está Louco is Adelaide Ferreira's third album.

== Track listing ==
1. O realizador
2. É por ti
3. Alma vazia
4. A vida não é fácil
5. Vou contigo
6. Quem foi que te fez
7. Doce Anjo
8. Qual é a cor
9. Oh mãe
10. Angustia (instrumental).
