= Amantes e Mortais =

Studio album by Adelaide Ferreira
- Released: 1989
- Recorded: 1989
- Genre: Pop Portugês
- Length: 2LP 89:05
- Label: MBP
- Producer: Jean Louis Milford

Adelaide Ferreira chronology
Entre Um Coco e Um Adeus (1986)	Amantes e Mortais (1989)	O Realizador está Louco (1996)

Amantes e Mortais (known in English as Fast and Far) is Adelaide Ferreira's second album released in 1989.

== Track listing ==
Portuguese Version

1. Amantes e Mortais
2. Vem Dançar
3. Dava Tudo
4. Na Maior
5. Marlene
6. São Loucos
7. Sem Medos
8. Quem não vê caras
9. Carrie
10. O Regresso do Sr. Rubirosa

English Version

1. Fast and Far
2. Running Forever
3. All the tears that we cried
4. Sammy
5. Silent Words
6. Crazy
7. Stranger
8. Monty Carlo
9. Carrie
10. The Return of Mr. Rubirosa
