= Entre Um Coco e Um Adeus =

Entre um coco e um adeus

Studio album by Adelaide Ferreira
- Released: 1986
- Genre: Pop, Portuguese Pop
- Length: 35:31
- Label: Polygram
- Producer: Ramón Galarza

Adelaide Ferreira chronology
Entre um coco e um adeus (1986)	Amantes e Mortais / Fast and Far (1989)

Entre Um Coco e Um Adeus is Adelaide Ferreira's first album.

== Track listing ==
1. Como encontrar o amor (Luís Fernando, Adelaide Ferreira, Ramón Galarza)
2. Coqueirando (Carolina Maldim, Ferreira, Fernando)
3. Papel principal (Tozé Brito)
4. Já não sei (Galarza)
5. Boa ou má arte (Fernando, Maldim)
6. Dar-te o que eu não dei (Ferreira, Fernando)
7. Tentação (Fernando, Ferreira)
8. Foi por amar-te (Ferreira, Galarza)
9. A-Deus (C. Fortuna)
