= Portugal in the Eurovision Song Contest 1984 =

Portuguese entry in the Eurovision Song Contest 1984

- Eurovision Song Contest 1984
- Participating broadcaster: Radiotelevisão Portuguesa (RTP)
- Country: Portugal
- Selection process: Festival RTP da Canção 1984
- Selection date: 7 March 1984

Competing entry
- Song: "Silêncio e tanta gente"
- Artist: Maria Guinot
- Songwriter: Maria Guinot

Placement
- Final result: 11th, 38 points

Participation chronology

Portugal was represented at the Eurovision Song Contest 1984 with the song "Silêncio e tanta gente", written and performed by Maria Guinot. The Portuguese participating broadcaster, Radiotelevisão Portuguesa (RTP), selected its entry at the Festival RTP da Canção 1984.

== Before Eurovision ==
=== Festival RTP da Canção 1984 ===
Radiotelevisão Portuguesa (RTP) held the Festival RTP da Canção 1984 at the Auditório Europa in Lisbon on 7 March 1984, hosted by Fialho Gouveia and Manuela Moura Guedes. The winner was chosen by an expert jury in two rounds of voting - the first to select the top 6 songs and the second to select the winner.

Doce represented Portugal in Eurovision in 1982. Two members of the group - Teresa Miguel and Fatima Padinha - also represented Portugal in Eurovision in 1978 with the group Gemini. Paulo de Carvalho and Fernando Tordo were both in the group 'Os Amigos' that represented Portugal in Eurovision in 1977. De Carvalho also represented Portugal in 1974 and Tordo did the same in 1973.

Final – 7 March 1984
R/O	Artist	Song	Points	Place	Result
1	Zélia Rodrigues	"Tricot de cheiros"	8	8	—N/a
2	António Sala	"Uma canção amiga"	10	6	Qualified
3	Doce	"O barquinho da esperança"	2	11	—N/a
4	Quinteto Paulo de Carvalho	"Já pode ser tarde"	9	7	—N/a
5	Adelaide Ferreira	"Quero-te, choro-te, odeio-te, adoro-te"	11	4	Qualified
6	Maria Guinot	"Silêncio e tanta gente"	17	1	Qualified
7	Marisa	"Num olhar"	0	13	—N/a
8	Banda Tribo	"A padeirinha de Aljubarrota"	12	3	Qualified
9	Samuel	"Pelo fim da tarde"	14	2	Qualified
10	Isabel Soares	"O nosso reencontro"	0	13	—N/a
11	Samuel e Cristina	"Este quadro"	0	13	—N/a
12	Rita Ribeiro	"Noticias vêm, noticias vão"	1	12	—N/a
13	Paco Bandeira	"Que coisa é esta vida"	11	4	Qualified
14	José Campos e Sousa	"Cidade mar"	0	13	—N/a
15	Fernando Tordo	"Canto de passagem"	6	10	—N/a
16	Samuel	"Maneira de ser"	8	8	—N/a

Superfinal – 7 March 1984
R/O	Artist	Song	Points	Place
1	António Sala	"Uma canção amiga"	82	6
2	Adelaide Ferreira	"Quero-te, choro-te, odeio-te, adoro-te"	110	4
3	Maria Guinot	"Silêncio e tanta gente"	151	1
4	Banda Tribo	"A padeirinha de Aljubarrota"	112	3
5	Samuel	"Pelo fim da tarde"	140	2
6	Paco Bandeira	"Que coisa é esta vida"	110	4

== At Eurovision ==
Guinot was the nineteenth and last performer on the night of the contest, following Italy. At the close of voting, "Silêncio e tanta gente" had received 38 points, placing Portugal 11th of the 19. The Portuguese jury awarded its 12 points to Spain.

=== Voting ===
Points awarded to Portugal
Score	Country
12 points	
10 points	
8 points	Germany; Switzerland
7 points	Yugoslavia
6 points	Netherlands
5 points	Spain
4 points	Luxembourg
3 points	
2 points	
1 point	

Points awarded by Portugal
Score	Country
12 points	Spain
10 points	Belgium
8 points	Italy
7 points	France
6 points	United Kingdom
5 points	Germany
4 points	Sweden
3 points	Finland
2 points	Ireland
1 point	Denmark
