= Henrique Feist =

Portuguese singer, actor, and director

- Born: August 7, 1972 (age 53); Lisbon, Portugal
- Education: Guildford School of Acting and Dance
- Occupations: singer, actor and director

Henrique Feist is a Portuguese singer, actor and director. He is married to Ricardo Spínola.

== Early career ==
Feist was born in Lisbon, Portugal and began his career as a pop singer in 1982 with his brother, performing on television and various radio shows. They recorded nine records, all of which hit the charts. In 1985 he created the role of Miguel in the Portuguese television soap Pedro e Paulina. That same year he was awarded the Best Newcomer Award by the Portuguese National Press. For the next five years he toured Portugal with his brother and began his singing training with Maria João Serrão from the Portuguese National Opera.

== Theatre training ==
Deciding to continue his studies in theatre he moved to England where he completed the three-year Musical Theatre course at the Guildford School of Acting. His work at drama college includes: Ciccio in The Most Happy Fella; Sancho in Man of La Mancha; Mr. Snow in Carousel as well as master classes with Martin Koch, Claire Moore and Morag McLaren.

He obtained his stage fighting certificate, the Trinity College of Music singing diploma and 1st prize in the Surrey Annual Music Festival. He returned to his native Portugal from the UK in 1993.

== Selected work ==
=== Television ===
- MC in Cabaret
- Algernon in The Importance of Being Earnest
- David e Silva in The Hour of Freedom
- Singing in the Channel One TV show Saturday Night Live, including the roles:
  - Javert (Les Misérables)
  - Chris (Miss Saigon)
  - Joe (Sunset Boulevard)
  - Jesus (Jesus Christ Superstar)
  - The Phantom (The Phantom of the Opera).

Feist translated and adapted for Portuguese television the comedy series Rising Damp and Three's Company.

For Channel 3 television, he was vocal and content director, as well as co-starring in, the television galas:

- The Sixties
- Summertime
- The Movies

As well as artistic and creative director and starring in the following live-on-tape gala performances:

- The Great Broad Way
- Latin Blood
- Channel 3 13th Anniversary Gala Performance

As well as artistic and creative director of:

- Channel 3 20th Anniversary Gala Performance
- 18th and 19th Golden Globe Awards Ceremony

He created, directed and starred in the gala Marco Paulo – A 40 year tribute for Channel 1 television.

He was also lead singer in the show Music from the Heart, for Channel 1 television, also released on CD.

Artistic director for the Channel 3 musical contest "Superstar Family".

Staged and starred in "Um País Chamado Simone" – a 50 year in showbusiness tribute to Simone de Oliveira for Channel 1 television.

Artistic Director for the Portuguese Song Festival 2008, 2009 and 2014, Channel One Television.

Musical Consultant for the TV Game Show "Singing Bee", Channel 3 Television.

Artistic Director for "Somos Portugal" for Channel 4 TV.

Artistic Consultant for the Channel 3 Game Show "Anything Goes"

=== Voice acting ===
- Goku, Gohan, Bardock and Trunks in Dragon Ball
- Biker Mice from Mars
- Dead End: Paranormal Park
- Dexter in Dexter's Laboratory
- Power Rangers
- Veggie Tales
- All Dogs go to Heaven (also Music director)
- Dimitri (singing) in Anastasia
- Radcliff in Pocahontas
- Kovu in The Lion King II
- Prince in Snow White
- Ramses in The Prince of Egypt
- Joseph (singing) in Joseph, King of Dreams
- Beast in Beauty and the Beast
- Joseph (singing) in The Nativity Story
- Edward (singing) in Enchanted
- Flynn (singing) in Tangled
- Gary in "The Muppets".
- Olaf in "Frozen".
- Caleb (singing) in Abc and Magic

He also dubbed Elton John in the Portuguese versions of El Dorado and "Gnomeo and Juliet". He has recorded many songs for Disney on Ice.

=== Stage ===
- Salo in Maldita Cocaína
- Daniel in My Night With Reg
- Tobias in Sweeney Todd 1997 and again in 2007
- Sam Jenkins / Senator Carver Jones in Of Thee I Sing
- Alain Oulman in Amália, in Lisbon and on tour (also associate director and musical supervisor)
- Emcee in Cabaret
- Mr.Zero in The Adding Machine

Played the lead in "Fado – A People's History" and "The Best of La Féria", both at the Estoril Casino.

Feist created, directed and participated in the following shows:

- Esta Vida é uma Cantiga (Life is a Song), a celebration of Portuguese revue and vaudeville
- Christmas at the Coliseum
- La Noche que me Quieras, celebrating Spanish, Italian and French music.
- 501 Years of Dance at the Lisbon Coliseum

He was vocal director and starred in

- The Great Composers of the American Musical Theatre, celebrating the music of Gershwin, Porter, Berlin, Kern and Rodgers
- A Return to Broadway, both in Lisbon and the Azores island.

He directed and translated the Off-Broadway hit Naked Boys Singing at the Estoril Casino, for which he won the 2009 Rainbow Award, a distinction given to those who fight for a more open democracy. This show had yet another sold-out run in 2015.

In the summer of 2006 Feist presented his show How Broadway Got To Portugal at the Figueira Casino and created the show Xmas Forever for Rádio Renascença's gala performance at the Trindade Theatre. At Christmas of the same year, he was special guest star for Channel 3 Television Disney Gala Performance. In 2009, Henrique was nominated for a Golden Globe in the category of Best Actor for his role as Emcee in Cabaret. In 2010, he won the SPA Best Actor Award for his role as Mr.Zero in The Adding Machine, for which he was also nominated once again for a Golden Globe in the category of Best Actor. In 2010, the INATEL foundation paid hommage to him and to his contribution to the theatre in Portugal. In 2012 he was distinguished with the Golden ASA. Henrique celebrated his 30-year career with his show "Broadway Baby" touring all over Portugal with sold out houses. In May 2013 he won the Golden Globe for Best Actor in what was his third nomination for his role in "Broadway Baby". In February 2013 he shared the stage with John Owen Jones, Robyn North and Madalena Alberto in "The Best of the Musicals" at the Lisbon Coliseum, repeating the show in November once again with John Owen Jones, Madalena Alberto and Sofia Escobar. In June 2014 he sold out the Lisbon Coliseum for three days with his show 74.14. The same show had a sold out run at the Oporto Coliseum in February 2015. In March 2015 he was invited by the Estoril Casino (the largest Casino in Europe) to run its theatre.

=== Teaching ===
Feist was vocal coach for the Lisbon Youth Theatre, working on the musicals: Camões, Prince of Poets and Man of La Mancha, for which he also wrote the lyrics. Since 2003, he has worked in close conjunction with the Portuguese Laryngology Association, coordinating voice workshops. He teaches musical theatre every summer at the Belem Cultural Centre.

=== Recording credits ===
- Portuguese version of Pokémon (including translation and directing)
- Disney International Hits
- Amalia – Original Cast Recording
- Great Fados, Great Voices II

=== Additional ===
- In 1996 he was invited to sing at the Aga Khan's birthday celebration.
- He reached the finals of the Channel 1 television show Strictly Come Dancing where he came 3rd.
- In September 2009, at the Portuguese anime oriented event, "Anipop", he was the main judge for the contest "Anipop's got talent".
