= Sofia Vitória =

Portuguese singer (born 1979)

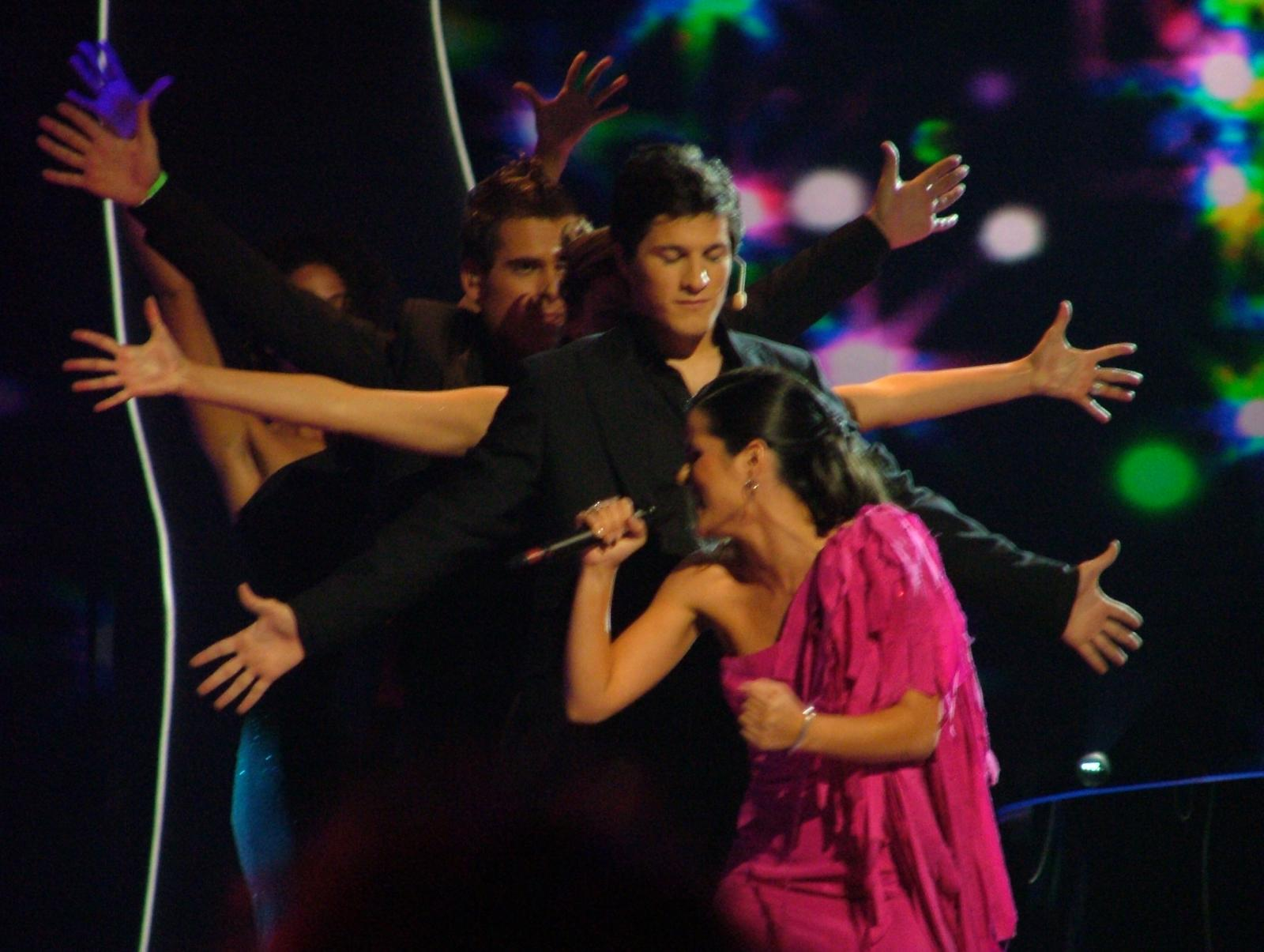
- Sofia Vitória (front) while rehearsing for the Eurovision Song Contest 2004

Background information
- Born: 28 April 1979 (age 47); Setúbal, Portugal
- Origin: Portugal
- Genre: Jazz World Music
- Occupation: Singer

Sofia Vitória Inácio (born 28 April 1979 in Setúbal, Portugal) is a Portuguese singer. Prior to recording her debut album "Palavra de Mulher", she performed in Portugal's main concert halls, as well as in Brazil, Spain, the Netherlands, Italy, Macao, Wales and Turkey.

Sofia is strongly influenced not only by Jazz but also by World Music. She released her first record in partnership with pianist Luís Figueiredo. All the songs included in the album "Palavra de Mulher" tell the story of feminine characters who inhabit Chico Buarque's musical world.

== Discography ==
- Sofia Vitória & Luís Figueiredo – "Palavra de Mulher" (Numérica, 2012)

=== Collaborations ===
- Luís Figueiredo – "Lado B" (Sintoma Records, 2012)

== Comments ==
About "Palavra de Mulher"

"It has been a long time since I have listened to the work of Chico in such an original and modern way, and at the same time with an intense sophistication and talent."

Ivan Lins (liner notes of the album)
