= Luxembourg in the Eurovision Song Contest 2026 =

- Eurovision Song Contest 2026
- Participating broadcaster: RTL Lëtzebuerg (RTL)
- Country: Luxembourg
- Selection process: Luxembourg Song Contest 2026
- Selection date: 24 January 2026

Competing entry
- Song: "Mother Nature"
- Artist: Eva Marija
- Songwriters: Eva Marija Kavaš Puc; Julie Aagaard; Maria Broberg; Thomas Stengaard

Placement
- Semi-final result: Failed to qualify (12th)

Participation chronology

Luxembourg was represented at the Eurovision Song Contest 2026 by the song "Mother Nature", written by Eva Marija Kavaš Puc, Julie Aagaard, Maria Broberg and Thomas Stengaard, and performed by Eva Marija herself. The Luxembourgish participating broadcaster, RTL Lëtzebuerg (RTL), organised the Luxembourg Song Contest 2026 in order to select its entry for the contest. It is the first Luxembourgish entry in the contest to be performed entirely in English. This was the first time to date that Luxembourg failed to qualify for the grand final.

== Background ==
Prior to the 2026 contest, RTL Lëtzebuerg (RTL), formerly as Compagnie Luxembourgeoise de Télédiffusion (CLT), had participated in the Eurovision Song Contest representing Luxembourg 39 times since debuting in its first edition of 1956. It had won the contest on five occasions: in 1961 with "Nous les amoureux" performed by Jean-Claude Pascal, in 1965 with "Poupée de cire, poupée de son" performed by France Gall, in 1972 with "Après toi" performed by Vicky Leandros, in 1973 with "Tu te reconnaîtras" performed by Anne-Marie David, and in 1983 with "Si la vie est cadeau" performed by Corinne Hermès. Following a 31-year absence, Luxembourg under RTL returned to the contest in 2024 where it qualified to the final and placed 13th with the song "Fighter" performed by Tali. It also qualified to the final in 2025 and placed 22nd with the song "La poupée monte le son" performed by Laura Thorn.

As part of its duties as participating broadcaster, RTL organises the selection of its entry in the Eurovision Song Contest and broadcasts the event in the country. The broadcaster confirmed its intentions to participate at the 2026 contest on 10 June 2025. CLT had selected its entries by using both national finals and internal selections in the past, with RTL organising the Luxembourg Song Contest national final to select its entry since 2024. Along with its 2026 participation confirmation, the broadcaster announced that it would again select its entry through the Luxembourg Song Contest.

== Before Eurovision ==
=== Luxembourg Song Contest 2026 ===
Luxembourg Song Contest 2026 was the competition organised by RTL to select its entry for the Eurovision Song Contest 2026. The competition featured eight acts and took place on 24 January 2026 at the Rockhal in Esch-sur-Alzette. It was hosted by Hana Sofia Lopes, Loïc Juchem, and Raoul Roos, and was broadcast on RTL Télé Lëtzebuerg as well as streamed online on RTL Infos with French-language commentary by Charlotte Gomez and Jérôme Didelot, on RTL Today Radio with English-language commentary by Meredith Moss and Melissa Dalton, and on RTL Play (with the original audio) and the Eurovision Song Contest's official YouTube channel.

==== Competing entries ====
On 4 July 2025, RTL opened a submission period for interested artists and songwriters to submit their applications in one or more of three categories: the first for performers with a song, the second for performers without a song, and the third for songwriters. Artists were required to be at least 18 years old by 24 January 2026 and have Luxembourg nationality, have lived in Luxembourg for three consecutive years, or have a strong link with the Luxembourg cultural scene, and were able to submit up to three entries each. Songwriters could be of any nationality. The application deadline for the second and third categories concluded on 3 August 2025, while the application deadline for the first category concluded on 21 September 2025. A songwriting camp organised by Rocklab took place at the Rockhal between 6 and 10 June 2025 where 45 local and international artists, songwriters and producers created songs for the competition. 83 entries were received by the end of the deadline, of which 23 came from performers who applied for the first category.

Auditions were held on 24 and 25 October 2025 at the RTL City in Kirchberg where an international jury panel evaluated the songs and shortlisted 15 entries for a final audition round on 26 October 2025, where the eight finalists were selected. The international jury panel consisted of Karin Gunnarsson (contest producer for Melodifestivalen in Sweden), Gísli Berg (executive producer of Söngvakeppnin in Iceland), Paul Jordan (British Eurovision expert), Ludovic-Alexandre Vidal (French lyricist), and Elsie Bay (Norwegian singer-songwriter). The eight participating acts were announced on 30 October 2025, including Luzac who competed in the 2025 edition of the Luxembourg Song Contest, while their songs were presented on 11 December 2025 on RTL Radio Lëtzebuerg, Today Radio as well as online on RTL Infos and the broadcaster's website rtl.lu.

Final audition round artists – 26 October 2025
- Andrew the Martian
- Ayumi Motta
- Daryss
- Eva Marija
- Hugo One
- Irem
- Leonardo Domingues
- Luzac
- Mäna
- Mirko Buljan and Marilù Bossio
- Patrícia Venâncio
- Ricardo Vieira
- ShiroKuro
- Steve Castile
- Vivi Air

Artist	Song	Songwriter(s)
Andrew the Martian	"I'm the Martian"	André Baptista; Rūdolfs Budze; Tchiah Ommar Abdulrahman; Ynke Dingenen
Daryss	"Melusina"	Alexandre Finkin; Antoine Barrau; Boban Apostolov; Daria Sokova
Eva Marija	"Mother Nature"	Eva Marija Kavaš Puc; Julie Aagaard; Maria Broberg; Thomas Stengaard
Hugo One	"Born Again"	Albin Fredy Ljungqvist; Edson Pires Domingos; Emil Adler Lei; Hugo Dejean
Irem	"Bad Decisions (Hush Hush)"	Irem Sosay; Maria Broberg; Remy Cooper
Luzac	"Prison dorée"	Lucas Zagdoudi; Sam Ray; Tchiah Ommar Abdulrahman; Ynke Dingenen
ShiroKuro	"Eye to Eye"	Louis Comblin; Matias Pollicino; Nathanaël Paulis
Steve Castile	"Sweet Tooth"	Abi F Jones; Simon Davis; Steve Castile

==== Final ====
The televised final took place on 24 January 2026. The winner was selected through two rounds of voting. In the first round of voting, the top three entries were selected to proceed to the second round, the superfinal, through the 50/50 combination of votes from eight international jury groups and public online voting on the RTL website, which also accepted votes worldwide. In the superfinal, the jury and public vote selected "Mother Nature" performed by Eva Marija as the winner. "Mother Nature" is the first song performed entirely in the English language that was selected to represent Luxembourg at the Eurovision Song Contest. The viewers and the juries each awarded a total of 240 points in the superfinal, with each jury group distributing 8, 10 and 12 points. The viewer vote was awarded proportionally, based on the percentage of votes each song achieved. For example, if a song gained 10% of the viewer vote, then that entry would be awarded 10% of 240 points rounded to the nearest integer: 24 points.

In addition to the performances of the competing entries, interval acts included former Eurovision winners Sandra Kim (in 1986 for Belgium) and JJ (in 2025 for Austria), MariKo, and former Eurovision entrants Væb (Iceland 2025) and Laura Thorn (Luxembourg 2025).

Final – 24 January 2026
R/O	Artist	Song	Ranks		Place
R/O	Artist	Song	Jury	Public	Place
1	Steve Castile	"Sweet Tooth"	2	3	2
2	Luzac	"Prison dorée"	5	5	7
3	Daryss	"Melusina"	4	7	5
4	ShiroKuro	"Eye to Eye"	3	6	4
5	Andrew the Martian	"I'm the Martian"	8	8	8
6	Hugo One	"Born Again"	6	4	6
7	Eva Marija	"Mother Nature"	1	1	1
8	Irem	"Bad Decisions (Hush Hush)"	7	2	3

Superfinal – 24 January 2026
Artist	Song	Jury	Public	Total	Place
Steve Castile	"Sweet Tooth"	80	56	136	2
Eva Marija	"Mother Nature"	94	128	222	1
Irem	"Bad Decisions (Hush Hush)"	66	56	122	3

Detailed international jury votes (Superfinal)
Song	Greece	Italy	Lithuania	Norway	Serbia	Czechia	Austria	United Kingdom	Total
Song	Greece	Italy	Lithuania	Norway	Serbia	Czech Republic	Austria	United Kingdom	Total
"Sweet Tooth"	10	12	10	10	10	10	10	8	80
"Mother Nature"	12	10	12	12	12	12	12	12	94
"Bad Decisions (Hush Hush)"	8	8	8	8	8	8	8	10	66
International jury spokespersons
Greece – Victoria Chalkitis; Italy – Maurizio Filardo; Lithuania – Monika Marija; Norway – Iris Severine Mikalsen; Serbia – Zejna Murkić; Czechia – Eliška Mrázová; Austria – Paenda; United Kingdom – Adele Roberts

==== Controversy ====
On 28 January 2026, RTL revealed it was consulting with multiple parties, including the EBU and SACEM, regarding claims that "Mother Nature" is plagiarised from the 2015 song "Keeping Your Head Up" by Birdy. However, it was cleared for participation.

== At Eurovision ==
The Eurovision Song Contest 2026 took place at the Wiener Stadthalle in Vienna, Austria, and consisted of two semi-finals held on the respective dates of 12 and 14 May and the final on 16 May 2026. All nations with the exceptions of the host country and the "Big Four" (France, Germany, Italy and the United Kingdom) were required to qualify from one of two semi-finals in order to compete for the final; the top ten countries from each semi-final progressed to the final. On 12 January 2026, an allocation draw was held to determine which of the two semi-finals, as well as which half of the show, each country performed in; the European Broadcasting Union (EBU) split up the competing countries into different pots based on voting patterns from previous contests, with countries with favourable voting histories put into the same pot. Luxembourg was scheduled for the first half of the second semi-final.

=== Voting ===
==== Points awarded to Luxembourg ====
Points awarded to Luxembourg (Semi-final 2)
Score	Televote	Jury
12 points		
10 points		
8 points		Latvia
7 points	Austria	Denmark; Ukraine
6 points	Denmark	
5 points		
4 points	Latvia; Malta	
3 points	Switzerland; Ukraine	
2 points	Bulgaria; France	Australia; Romania
1 point	Cyprus; Czechia; United Kingdom	

==== Points awarded by Luxembourg ====
Points awarded by Luxembourg (Semi-final 2)
Score	Televote	Jury
12 points	Bulgaria	Romania
10 points	Romania	Australia
8 points	Cyprus	Denmark
7 points	Ukraine	Norway
6 points	Albania	Malta
5 points	Denmark	Bulgaria
4 points	Malta	Ukraine
3 points	Latvia	Czechia
2 points	Czechia	Albania
1 point	Australia	Switzerland

Points awarded by Luxembourg (Final)
Score	Televote	Jury
12 points	Bulgaria	Romania
10 points	Romania	Australia
8 points	Greece	Bulgaria
7 points	Italy	Croatia
6 points	Moldova	France
5 points	Finland	Denmark
4 points	Ukraine	Norway
3 points	Albania	Finland
2 points	France	Malta
1 point	Israel	Austria

==== Detailed voting results ====
Each participating broadcaster assembles a seven-member jury panel consisting of music industry professionals who are citizens of the country they represent and two of which have to be between 18 and 25 years old. Each jury, and individual jury member, is required to meet a strict set of criteria regarding professional background, as well as diversity in gender and age. No member of a national jury was permitted to be related in any way to any of the competing acts in such a way that they cannot vote impartially and independently. The individual rankings of each jury member as well as the nation's televoting results were released shortly after the grand final.

The following members comprised the Luxembourgish jury:

- Charel Storn
- Melvyn Schartz
- Paul Bradshaw
- Laura Thorn (represented Luxembourg in the Eurovision Song Contest 2025)
- Letizia Lovece
- Marie Gales
- Naomi Ayé Vaidovics Suárez

Detailed voting results from Luxembourg (Semi-final 2)
R/O	Country	Jury									Televote	
R/O	Country	Juror A	Juror B	Juror C	Juror D	Juror E	Juror F	Juror G	Rank	Points	Rank	Points
01	Bulgaria	12	4	3	2	8	13	8	6	5	1	12
02	Azerbaijan	10	11	7	10	14	14	14	14		14	
03	Romania	6	1	1	3	4	1	1	1	12	2	10
04	Luxembourg											
05	Czechia	8	7	9	14	2	5	9	8	3	9	2
06	Armenia	14	5	10	9	11	6	7	12		13	
07	Switzerland	4	8	11	5	7	7	12	10	1	12	
08	Cyprus	9	14	12	12	9	9	4	13		3	8
09	Latvia	3	12	8	13	6	10	13	11		8	3
10	Denmark	1	9	4	11	10	3	3	3	8	6	5
11	Australia	2	13	14	1	5	4	2	2	10	10	1
12	Ukraine	7	2	13	7	3	11	10	7	4	4	7
13	Albania	11	3	6	6	12	12	5	9	2	5	6
14	Malta	13	6	5	8	1	8	6	5	6	7	4
15	Norway	5	10	2	4	13	2	11	4	7	11	

Detailed voting results from Luxembourg (Final)
R/O	Country	Jury								Televote	
R/O	Country	Juror A	Juror B	Juror C	Juror D	Juror E	Juror F	Rank	Points	Rank	Points
01	Denmark	5	16	10	1	5	12	6	5	17	
02	Germany	20	10	19	8	24	22	20		11	
03	Israel	8	9	20	15	17	24	18		10	1
04	Belgium	15	4	21	9	22	21	15		20	
05	Albania	13	12	14	16	20	8	17		8	3
06	Greece	21	11	24	22	9	19	22		3	8
07	Ukraine	14	13	5	17	18	4	12		7	4
08	Australia	9	3	8	3	2	14	2	10	13	
09	Serbia	22	22	18	21	10	9	21		18	
10	Malta	10	23	2	11	8	7	9	2	19	
11	Czechia	16	19	4	10	7	16	13		23	
12	Bulgaria	3	2	12	23	15	2	3	8	1	12
13	Croatia	11	21	1	19	3	5	4	7	14	
14	United Kingdom	12	25	25	20	23	23	24		25	
15	France	17	6	3	12	6	3	5	6	9	2
16	Moldova	24	20	17	24	13	6	19		5	6
17	Finland	18	14	16	5	1	11	8	3	6	5
18	Poland	4	17	11	2	19	17	11		12	
19	Lithuania	19	24	23	25	25	10	23		15	
20	Sweden	6	15	7	13	14	18	14		21	
21	Cyprus	23	18	22	18	16	25	25		16	
22	Italy	25	7	15	7	12	20	16		4	7
23	Norway	2	5	13	6	11	15	7	4	24	
24	Romania	1	8	6	4	4	1	1	12	2	10
25	Austria	7	1	9	14	21	13	10	1	22	
