= Eva Marija =

Luxembourgish singer

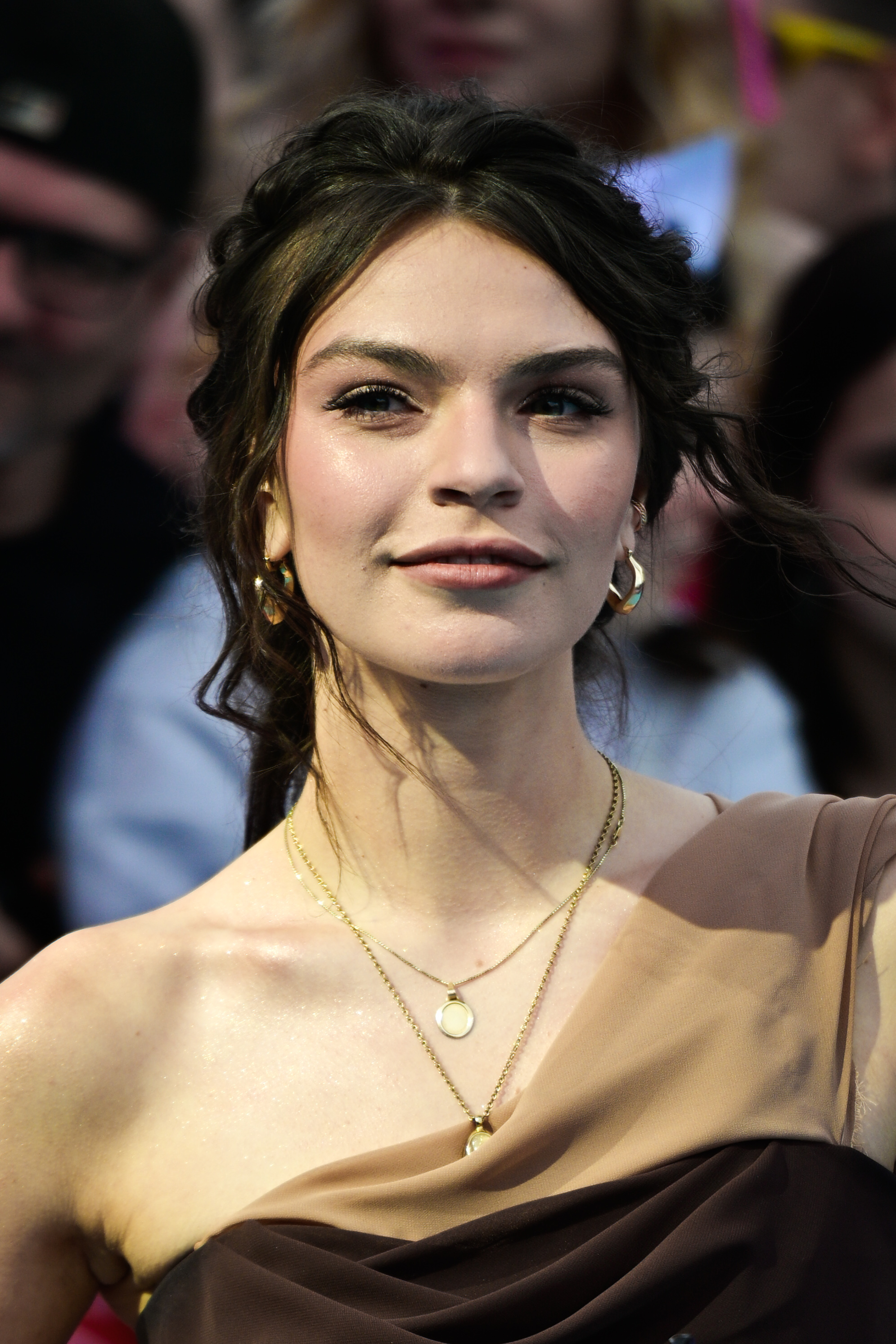
- Eva Marija in 2026

Background information
- Born: Eva Marija Kavaš Puc; 24 December 2005 (age 20); Luxembourg City, Luxembourg
- Occupations: Singer; songwriter; violinist
- Instruments: Vocals; violin
- Years active: 2021 - present

Eva Marija Kavaš Puc (born 24 December 2005), known as Eva Marija, is a Luxembourgish singer-songwriter and violinist. She represented Luxembourg in the Eurovision Song Contest 2026 with the song "Mother Nature".

== Early life and education ==
Puc was born and raised in Luxembourg to Slovenian parents from Ljubljana and Beltinci, who emigrated to Luxembourg in 2003 for their work at European Union institutions. She has three younger brothers and speaks five languages including French, English, Slovenian, Croatian, Luxembourgish as well as being able to speak some German.

She attended the European School of Luxembourg II and continued her studies at the Conservatoire de Luxembourg, where she received a versatile musical education. As of 2026, she is in her final year studying songwriting at the Institute of Contemporary Music Performance in London.

== Eurovision Song Contest 2026 ==
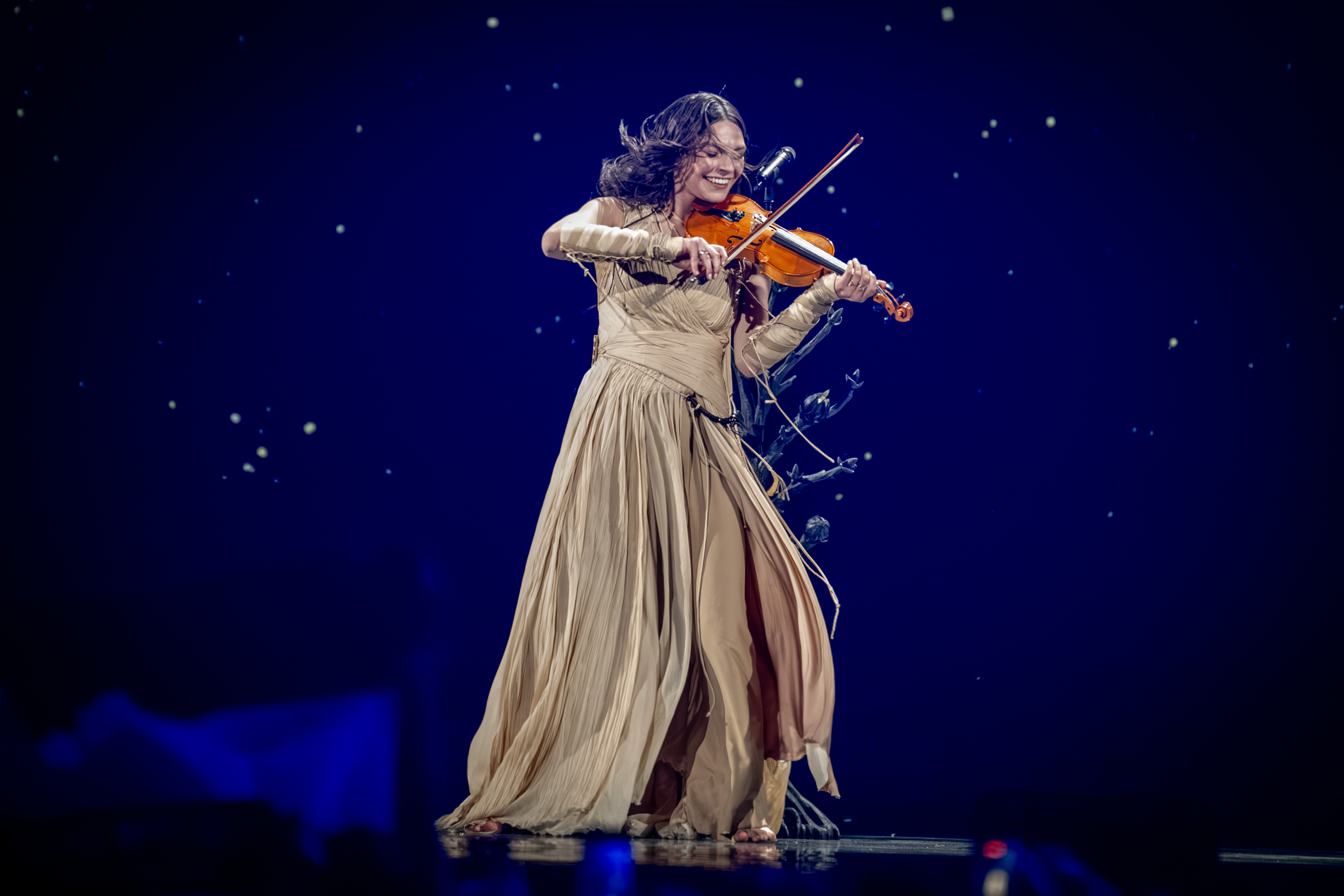
Eva Marija at her Eurovision Song Contest 2026 performance

On 30 October 2025, RTL Lëtzebuerg announced that Puc would participate in the Luxembourg Song Contest 2026 with the song "Mother Nature". She won both the jury and public vote in the final on 24 January 2026. As a result, she won the right to represent Luxembourg in the Eurovision Song Contest 2026 in Vienna, Austria. She performed 4th in the second semi-final on 14 May 2026, in which she failed to qualify to the grand final, the first time that Luxembourg had failed to qualify since its return to the contest in 2024.

== Discography ==
=== Singles ===
Title	Year	Peak chart positions	Album or EP
Title	Year	LUX	Album or EP
"When 2 Lovers Meet"	2021	—	Non-album singles
"Toxic Trait"	2023	—	Non-album singles
"Time to Go"	2025	—	Non-album singles
"Sweet Child"	2025	—	Non-album singles
"Mother Nature"	2025	25	Non-album singles
"Little Star"	2026	—	Non-album singles
"—" denotes a recording that did not chart or was not released in that territory.

Awards and achievements
Preceded by Laura Thorn with "La poupée monte le son"	Luxembourg in the Eurovision Song Contest; 2026	Succeeded by TBD
