= Laura Thorn =

Luxembourgish singer and music teacher

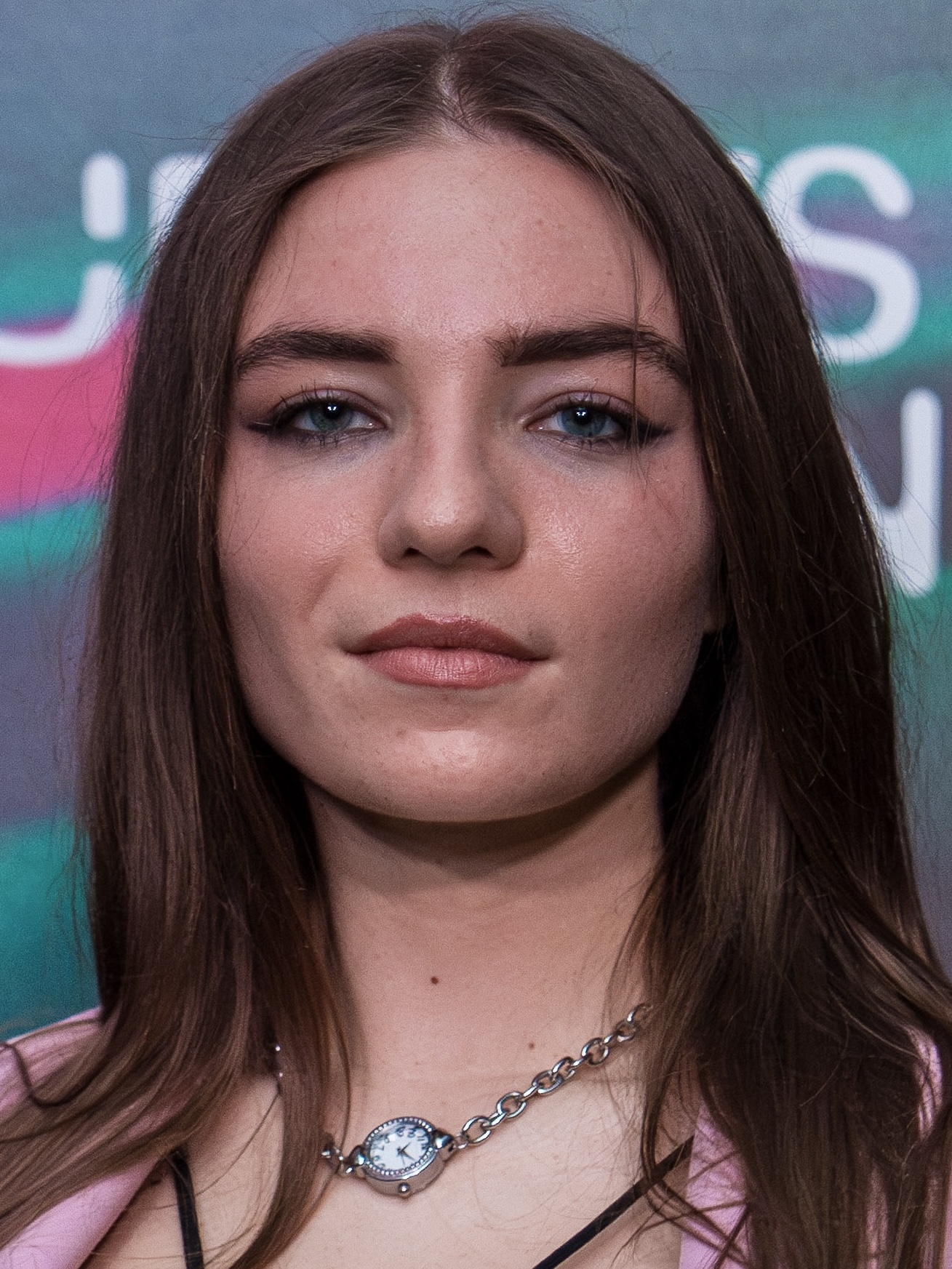
- Thorn in 2025

Background information
- Born: 18 January 2000 (age 26); Schifflange, Luxembourg
- Origin: Esch-sur-Alzette, Luxembourg
- Genres: Pop
- Occupations: Singer; music teacher
- Instrument: Vocals
- Years active: 2024–present
- Partner: Félix Schipman (Namski)

Laura Thorn (pronounced [ˈlɑʊ̯ʀaː ˈtoːɐ̯n]; born 18 January 2000) is a Luxembourgish singer and music teacher. She represented Luxembourg in the Eurovision Song Contest 2025 with the song "La poupée monte le son", finishing in 22nd place overall with 47 points.

== Life and career ==
Thorn has been trained in music theory, piano, cello, keyboard, chamber music and dance from a young age. Since the age of five, Thorn has performed on stage and taken part in musical competitions. She completed her studies with a master's degree in music theory, music pedagogy, and pop singing, from IMEP in Namur. Thorn is a teacher at the Esch-sur-Alzette Conservatory of Music.

In 2024, a Parisian record production duo, consisting of Julien Salvia and Ludovic-Alexandre Vidal, were searching for a Luxembourgish singer for their new track. They contacted Thorn through a former singing teacher of hers to perform their song, which was later named "La poupée monte le son". Thorn went on to submit the song to Luxembourg Song Contest 2025, which acted as Luxembourg's national final for Eurovision Song Contest 2025. On 18 November 2024, Thorn was announced as one of seven finalists in the competition. On 25 January 2025, during the final of Luxembourg Song Contest 2025, which was held in Rockhal, Thorn got the most points from international juries and second place in the televote, ultimately winning the competition and receiving the right to represent Luxembourg in Basel.

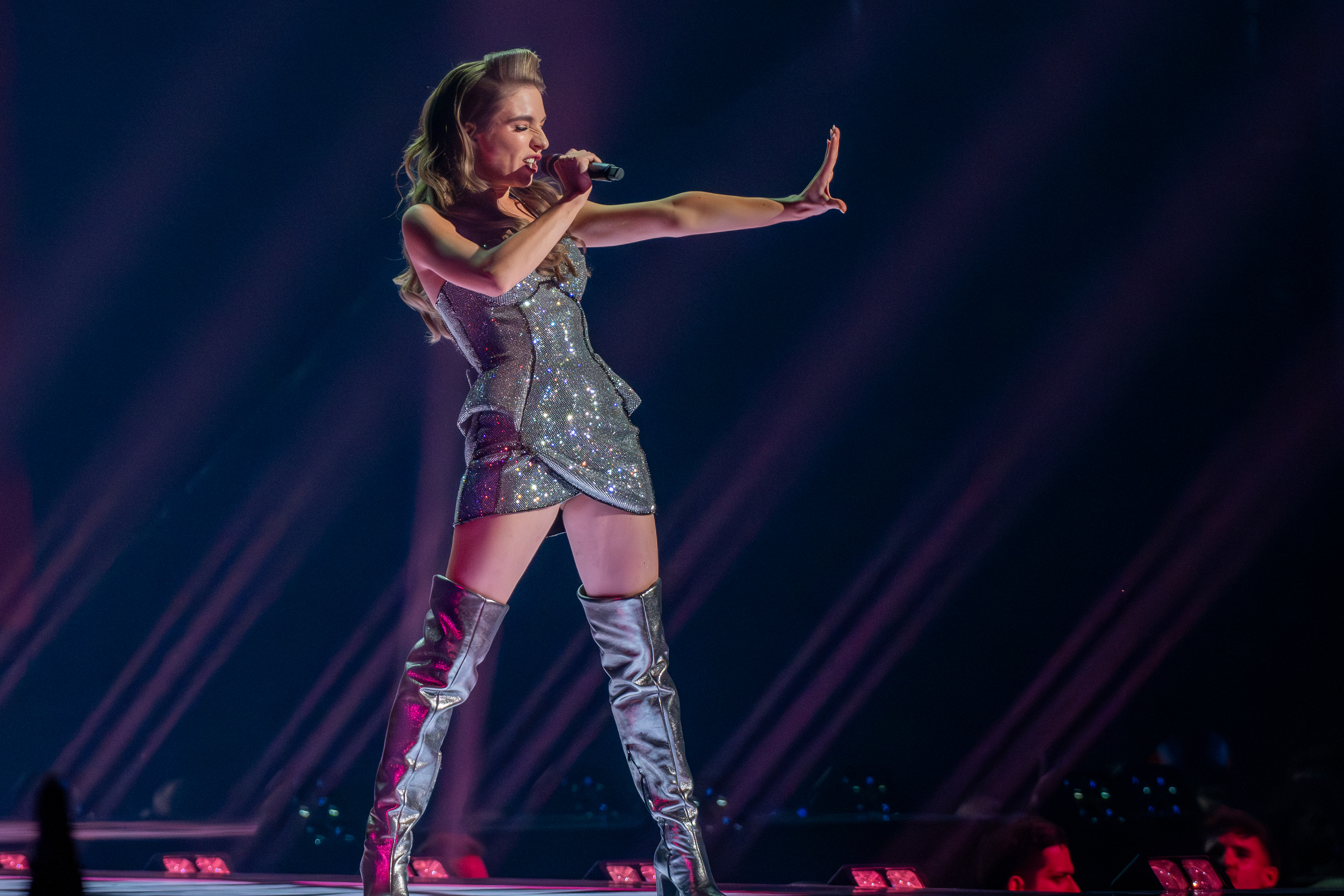
Thorn at Eurovision 2025 in Basel, Switzerland

== Discography ==
=== Singles ===
Title	Year	Peak chart positions				Album or EP
Title	Year	LUX	FIN	LTU	SWI	Album or EP
"La poupée monte le son"	2024	6	46	45	35	Non-album singles
"Not On Me"	2026	—	—	—	—	Non-album singles
"—" denotes a recording that did not chart or was not released in that territory.

== Awards and nominations ==
Year	Award	Category	Nominee(s)	Result	Ref.
2025	Eurovision Awards	Luscious Locks	Herself	Won	

Awards and achievements
Preceded by Tali with "Fighter"	Luxembourg in the Eurovision Song Contest; 2025	Succeeded by Eva Marija with "Mother Nature"
