= Luxembourg in the Eurovision Song Contest =

- Eurovision Song Contest
- Participating broadcaster: RTL Lëtzebuerg (RTL; 2024–present) Formerly: Compagnie Luxembourgeoise de Télédiffusion (CLT; 1956–1993)

Participation summary
- Appearances: 40 (39 finals)
- First appearance: 1956
- Highest placement: 1st: 1961, 1965, 1972, 1973, 1983
- Host: 1962, 1966, 1973, 1984
- Participation history: 1956; 1957; 1958; 1959; 1960; 1961; 1962; 1963; 1964; 1965; 1966; 1967; 1968; 1969; 1970; 1971; 1972; 1973; 1974; 1975; 1976; 1977; 1978; 1979; 1980; 1981; 1982; 1983; 1984; 1985; 1986; 1987; 1988; 1989; 1990; 1991; 1992; 1993; 1994 – 2023; 2024; 2025; 2026

External links
- RTL website
- Luxembourg's page at Eurovision.com
- For the most recent participation see Luxembourg in the Eurovision Song Contest 2026

Luxembourg has been represented at the Eurovision Song Contest 40 times since its debut at the first contest in 1956. The current Luxembourgish participating broadcaster in the contest is RTL Lëtzebuerg (RTL). The country participated in all but one event between 1956 and 1993, only missing the 1959 contest. After finishing among the bottom seven countries in 1993, Luxembourg was relegated and prevented from competing in 1994. The participating broadcaster at that time, Compagnie Luxembourgeoise de Télédiffusion (CLT), declined to return to the contest in 1995, and would make no further appearances over the next three decades. RTL returned to the event for Luxembourg the first time in 31 years in 2024.

With five wins, Luxembourg is one of the contest's most successful nations, and from 1973-1976 and 1983-1994 the nation jointly held the record for most contest wins by a single country. Luxembourg won the Eurovision Song Contest in 1961, with the song "Nous les amoureux" performed by Jean-Claude Pascal, in 1965, with the song "Poupée de cire, poupée de son" performed by France Gall, recorded back-to-back wins in 1972 and 1973, when represented by "Après toi" by Vicky Leandros and "Tu te reconnaîtras" by Anne-Marie David, and most recently in 1983, with the song "Si la vie est cadeau" performed by Corinne Hermès. The contest has been held in Luxembourg four times, in 1962, 1966, 1973, and 1984, all of which took place in Luxembourg City. In addition to its five wins, Luxembourg recorded two third-place finishes in 1962 and 1986, and in total has placed within the top five 13 times and the top ten 19 times. Luxembourg's fortunes in the contest changed in later years, with the nation's final seven appearances in the 1980s and 1990s resulting in four placements in the bottom five, ultimately leading to the nation's relegation and subsequent non-participation in 1993. On its return in 2024, Luxembourg qualified from the semi-finals and ultimately finished in 13th place in the final. It again qualified for the final in 2025 and placed 22nd. In 2026, Luxembourg failed to qualify for the first time ever in its history, leaving Ukraine, once again, as the only country to qualify every year it has participated in a semi final.

== Participation ==
Participation in the Eurovision Song Contest is open to members of the European Broadcasting Union (EBU). Between 1956 and 1993, Compagnie Luxembourgeoise de Télédiffusion (CLT) participated in the contest representing Luxembourg; since 2024, RTL Lëtzebuerg, a division of the RTL Group, has participated representing Luxembourg.

== History ==
One of seven countries to take part in the inaugural edition of the Eurovision Song Contest in 1956, Luxembourg has competed in the contest on 38 occasions since its debut entry. The nation participated in all but one event between 1956 and 1993, with no Luxembourgish entry having participated in the 1959 contest. On each occasion that Luxembourg participated in the contest the country was represented by one song, with the exception of the first contest when each nation was represented by two songs.

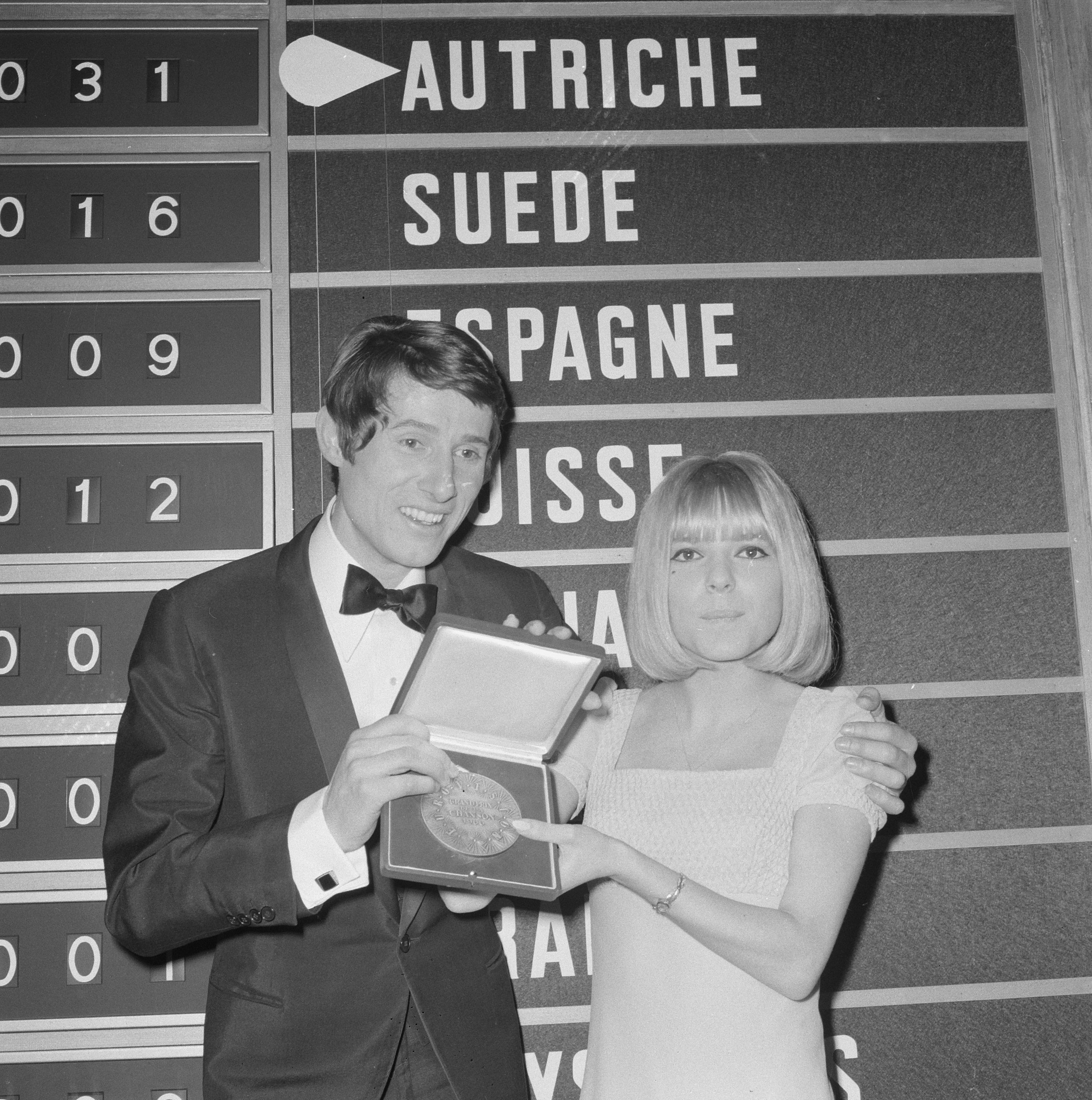
France Gall, winner of the 1965 contest, presenting the winner's medal to Austria's Udo Jürgens at the 1966 contest held in Luxembourg City.

Luxembourg has won the contest on five occasions, marking it as one of the contest's most successful nations. The country's first win was recorded in 1961 with the song "Nous les amoureux" performed by Jean-Claude Pascal. Four years later the nation were awarded a second victory, with the song "Poupée de cire, poupée de son" performed by France Gall winning the contest in 1965. Luxembourg recorded back-to-back victories in 1972 and 1973 – becoming the second country to win the event in two consecutive events – when represented by the song "Après toi" performed by Vicky Leandros, and "Tu te reconnaîtras" by Anne-Marie David, respectively. The nation achieved its most recent victory in 1983, with the song "Si la vie est cadeau" performed by Corinne Hermès. With its fifth win Luxembourg became the joint-most successful Eurovision nation at that time, equalling the record for the most number of victories by a single country previously set by France – a record which would remain until Ireland recorded their sixth win in 1994. All of Luxembourg's winners, however, were not of Luxembourgish descent, with four of the five artists being French and one, Leandros, being Greek.

During its original participation run between 1956 and 1993 the rules of the contest for the majority of those editions stated that each country was required to perform in one of the national languages of that country. The large majority of Luxembourgish entries were performed in French, which is one of the official languages of Luxembourg and the main language of communication in the country, while Luxembourgish, the country's national language, has featured in only three of the country's entries, in 1960, 1992, and 1993.

Including its five wins, Luxembourg has placed within the top five on 13 occasions and within the top ten on 20 occasions, including two third-place finishes in 1962 and 1986. The majority of the country's top placings, however, were recorded prior to its fifth contest win, and in the decade following its most recent victory Luxembourg's fortunes in the contest began to shift, leading to four appearances in the bottom five between 1987 and 1993.

=== Relegation and absence ===
After finishing among the bottom seven countries at the 1993 event, Luxembourg was relegated under a new system to accommodate entries from new nations wishing to compete for the first time, and was thus prevented from participating in the 1994 contest. CLT subsequently declined to participate in the 1995 event and continued to be absent from the contest for three decades, with the increased costs of participating in the event cited as a main contributing factor for the country's absence. Ahead of the 2004 event Luxembourg was featured within a preliminary participants list for that edition, however, RTL subsequently reconsidered due to the scale of the participation fee, with Luxembourg ultimately absent from the final list of participating countries. RTL had been approached on several occasions in subsequent years about the possibility of returning to the contest and participation in the contest was the subject of discussion within the Luxembourgish parliament in the years following Luxembourg's last entry, as well as the subject of fan-led petitions run both in Luxembourg and in other countries. The organisation however varyingly identified high participation costs, organisational difficulties, the cost and logistical issues of staging the event should Luxembourg win, format incompatibilities at the broadcaster, disinterest among the Luxembourgish viewing public and poor results towards the end of Luxembourg's participation among the reasons future participation was consistently ruled out. In an interview with Luxemburger Wort in April 2014, Luxembourgish singer Thierry Mersch revealed that he had been contacted by Sammarinese broadcaster San Marino RTV to create a duet that would represent both countries jointly in the 2015 contest. Despite the initial availability of Luxembourgish minister of Culture, the project was ultimately discarded for financial reasons.

=== Return ===
On 15 December 2022, it was reported that Xavier Bettel, the Luxembourgish prime minister and minister for communications and media, had instigated discussions with RTL regarding the return of Luxembourg to the Eurovision Song Contest in 2024, with a team within the Luxembourgish government formed to facilitate the country's return to the event. On 12 May 2023, ahead of the final of the 2023 contest, the 30th anniversary of Luxembourg's last entry and the 40th anniversary of Luxembourg's last win, RTL and the EBU announced that Luxembourg would return to the contest in 2024. As part of the announcement, RTL and the Luxembourgish government highlighted the promotion of Luxembourgish culture, the development of the cultural section of Luxembourgish society, as well as economic and touristic benefits which participation in the event could bring.

In July 2023, RTL launched its national selection process, with a televised final held on 27 January 2024 at the Rockhal in Esch-sur-Alzette. Interested artists were able to apply to compete in the event, with applicants required to be Luxembourgish citizens, long-term residents, or those with a proven connection to the Luxembourgish music scene and strong involvement with Luxembourgish culture. This marked a change from the majority of previous Luxembourgish selections, which were predominantly held internally and were often led by the RTL organisation in Paris instead of the local Luxembourgish broadcaster; due to this, a large number of the artists who represented Luxembourg in the contest were not of Luxembourgish descent, including all five of the nation's winning artists. The Luxembourg Song Contest was officially launched on 1 December 2023, with RTL highlighting the event as a showcase for Luxembourgish talent and a platform for established and emerging artists within the Luxembourgish music scene. The chosen entry for 2024, "Fighter" by Tali, qualified for the final and finished 13th. "La poupée monte le son" by Laura Thorn also qualified for the final in 2025 and finished 22nd. "Mother Nature" by Eva Marija failed to qualify for the final for the first time in Luxembourg's history in 2026.

== Participation overview ==
Table key
1	First place
3	Third place
◁	Last place

Participation history
Year	Artist	Song	Language	Final	Points	Semi	Points
1956	Michèle Arnaud	"Ne crois pas"	French	—N/a (Note: The 1956 contest had secret voting and, apart from the winner, no results were released.)	—N/a	No semi-finals	
1956	Michèle Arnaud	"Les Amants de minuit"	French	—N/a	—N/a	No semi-finals	
1957	Danièle Dupré	"Tant de peine"	French	4	8	No semi-finals	
1958	Solange Berry	"Un grand amour"	French	9 ◁	1	No semi-finals	
1960	Camillo Felgen	"So laang we's du do bast"	Luxembourgish	13 ◁	1	No semi-finals	
1961	Jean-Claude Pascal	"Nous les amoureux"	French	1	31	No semi-finals	
1962	Camillo Felgen	"Petit bonhomme"	French	3	11	No semi-finals	
1963	Nana Mouskouri	"À force de prier"	French	8	13	No semi-finals	
1964	Hugues Aufray	"Dès que le printemps revient"	French	4	14	No semi-finals	
1965	France Gall	"Poupée de cire, poupée de son"	French	1	32	No semi-finals	
1966	Michèle Torr	"Ce soir je t'attendais"	French	10	7	No semi-finals	
1967	Vicky Leandros	"L'amour est bleu"	French	4	17	No semi-finals	
1968	Chris Baldo and Sophie Garel	"Nous vivrons d'amour"	French	11	5	No semi-finals	
1969	Romuald	"Catherine"	French	11	7	No semi-finals	
1970	David Alexandre Winter	"Je suis tombé du ciel"	French	12 ◁	0	No semi-finals	
1971	Monique Melsen	"Pomme, pomme, pomme"	French	13	70	No semi-finals	
1972	Vicky Leandros	"Après toi"	French	1	128	No semi-finals	
1973	Anne-Marie David	"Tu te reconnaîtras"	French	1	129	No semi-finals	
1974	Ireen Sheer	"Bye Bye I Love You"	French, English	4	14	No semi-finals	
1975	Géraldine	"Toi"	French	5	84	No semi-finals	
1976	Jürgen Marcus	"Chansons pour ceux qui s'aiment"	French	14	17	No semi-finals	
1977	Anne-Marie B	"Frère Jacques"	French	16	17	No semi-finals	
1978	Baccara	"Parlez-vous français ?"	French	7	73	No semi-finals	
1979	Jeane Manson	"J'ai déjà vu ça dans tes yeux"	French	13	44	No semi-finals	
1980	Sophie and Magaly	"Papa Pingouin"	French	9	56	No semi-finals	
1981	Jean-Claude Pascal	"C'est peut-être pas l'Amérique"	French	11	41	No semi-finals	
1982	Svetlana	"Cours après le temps"	French	6	78	No semi-finals	
1983	Corinne Hermès	"Si la vie est cadeau"	French	1	142	No semi-finals	
1984	Sophie Carle	"100% d'amour"	French	10	39	No semi-finals	
1985	Margo, Franck Olivier, Chris Roberts, Malcolm Roberts, Ireen Sheer and Diane Solomon	"Children, Kinder, Enfants"	French	13	37	No semi-finals	
1986	Sherisse Laurence	"L'Amour de ma vie"	French	3	117	No semi-finals	
1987	Plastic Bertrand	"Amour amour"	French	21	4	No semi-finals	
1988	Lara Fabian	"Croire"	French	4	90	No semi-finals	
1989	Park Café	"Monsieur"	French	20	8	No semi-finals	
1990	Céline Carzo	"Quand je te rêve"	French	13	38	No semi-finals	
1991	Sarah Bray	"Un baiser volé"	French	14	29	No semi-finals	
1992	Marion Welter and Kontinent	"Sou fräi"	Luxembourgish	21	10	No semi-finals	
1993	Modern Times	"Donne-moi une chance"	French, Luxembourgish	20	11	Kvalifikacija za Millstreet	
2024	Tali	"Fighter"	French, English	13	103	5	117
2025	Laura Thorn	"La poupée monte le son"	French	22	47	7	62
2026	Eva Marija	"Mother Nature"	English	Failed to qualify		12	60
2027	Confirmed intention to participate †						

=== Congratulations: 50 Years of the Eurovision Song Contest ===
A special competition was held in October 2005 to celebrate the contest's 50th anniversary, with 14 songs from Eurovision history competing to determine the most popular song from the contest's first 50 years, with the winner determined through the combined votes of the viewing public and juries over two rounds. The contest was not relayed by a Luxembourgish broadcaster; however, Luxembourg's winning song from 1965, "Poupée de cire, poupée de son", performed by France Gall, was featured among the 14 selected songs.

Participation history at Congratulations: 50 Years of the Eurovision Song Contest
Artist	Song	Language	At Congratulations				At Eurovision		
Artist	Song	Language	Final	Points	Semi	Points	Year	Place	Points
France Gall	"Poupée de cire, poupée de son"	French	Failed to qualify		14 ◁	37	1965	1	32

== Hostings ==
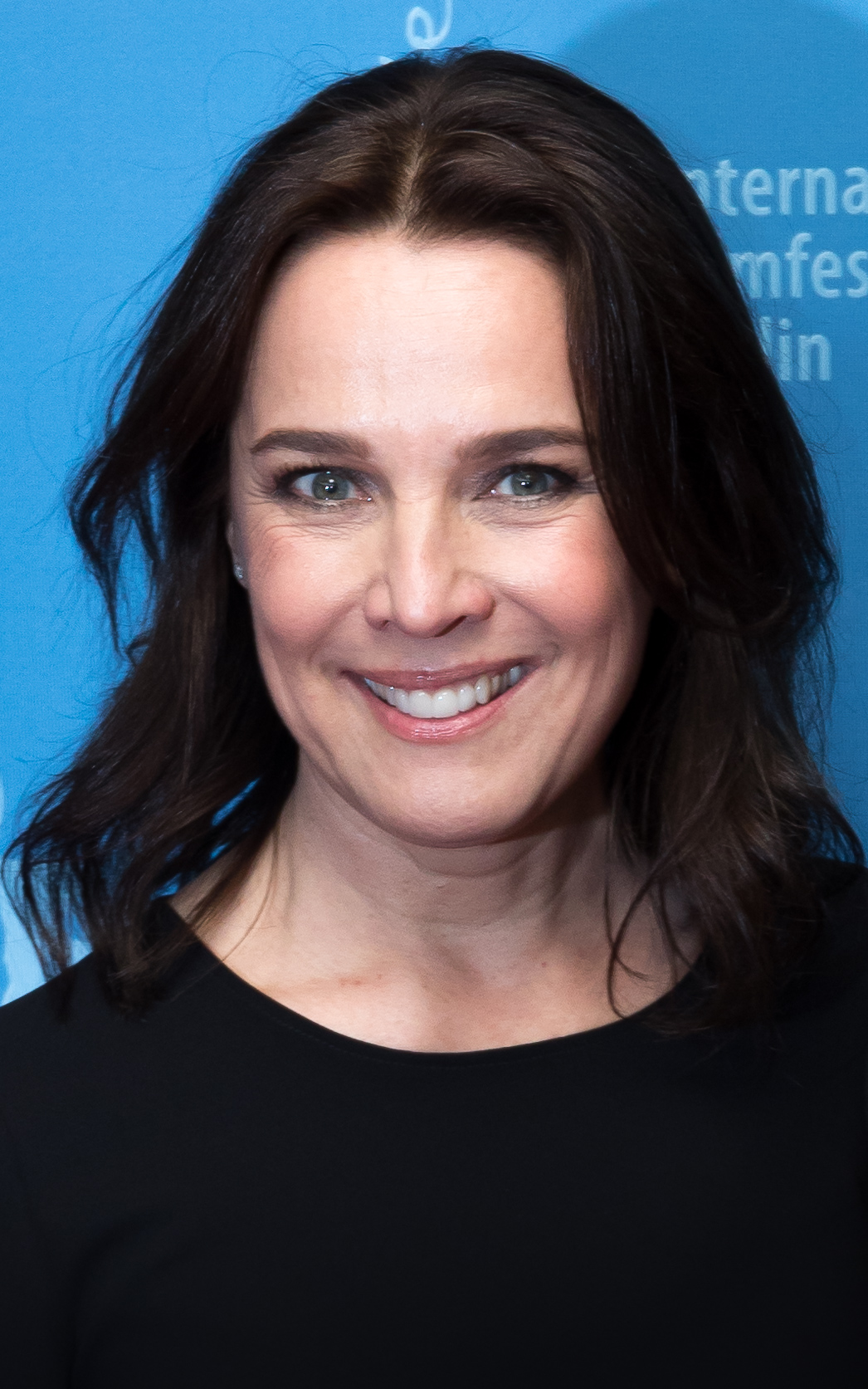
Luxembourgish actress and television presenter Désirée Nosbusch (pictured in 2018) was nineteen years old when she hosted the 1984 contest, becoming the youngest presenter in the contest's history. Upon Luxembourg's return to the contest in 2024, she became the first Luxembourgish spokesperson to appear in vision during the contest.

As is customary the winning broadcaster is offered the opportunity to organise the following year's event, which has resulted in Luxembourg hosting the contest on four occasions. On each occasion the contest was held in Luxembourg City, and coincided with one of Luxembourg's victories. The 1962 and 1966 events were held in the Grand Auditorium of Villa Louvigny and presented by Mireille Delannoy and Josiane Shen, respectively. The 1973 and 1984 contests were held in the Grand Théâtre de Luxembourg (also known at the time as the Nouveau Théâtre and Théâtre Municipal) and presented by Helga Guitton and Désirée Nosbusch, respectively. Although Luxembourg won the contest in 1973 and were offered the opportunity to stage the 1974 event, RTL declined the offer due to the financial strain of hosting two consecutive events, leading to the BBC to step in as organiser and staging the event in Brighton.

Year	Location	Venue	Executive producer	Director	Musical director	Presenter	Ref.
1962	Luxembourg City	Grand Auditorium de RTL, Villa Louvigny	—N/a	Jos Pauly and René Steichen	Jean Roderes	Mireille Delannoy	
1966	Luxembourg City	Grand Auditorium de RTL, Villa Louvigny	—N/a	Jos Pauly and René Steichen	Jean Roderes	Josiane Shen	
1973	Luxembourg City	Nouveau Théâtre	—N/a	René Steichen	Pierre Cao	Helga Guitton	
1984	Luxembourg City	Théâtre Municipal	Ray van Cant	René Steichen	Pierre Cao	Désirée Nosbusch	

== Related involvement ==
=== Heads of delegation ===
Each participating broadcaster in the Eurovision Song Contest assigns a head of delegation as the EBU's contact person and the leader of their delegation at the event. The delegation, whose size can greatly vary, includes a head of press, the performers, songwriters, composers, and backing vocalists, among others. The Luxembourgish head of delegation in 2024 and 2025 been Eric Lehmann, whilst Elisabeth Conter was Head of Delegation for the 2026 contest.

=== Conductors ===
In contests where an orchestra was provided, a conductor was required to lead the musicians during each country's performance. Broadcasters were able to provide their own conductors or could call upon the services of the conductor appointed by the host broadcaster. The conductors which led the orchestra during the Luxembourgish entries each year are listed below.

Conductors
Year	Conductor	Ref.
1956	Jacques Lasry	
1957	Willy Berking (Note: Entry conducted by the host country's musical director)	
1958	Dolf van der Linden	
1960	Eric Robinson	
1961	Léo Chauliac	
1962	Jean Roderes	
1963	Eric Robinson	
1964	Jacques Denjean	
1965	Alain Goraguer	
1966	Jean Roderes	
1967	Claude Denjean	
1968	André Borly	
1969	Augusto Algueró	
1970	Raymond Lefèvre	
1971	Jean Claudric	
1972	Klaus Munro	
1973	Pierre Cao	
1974	Charles Blackwell	
1975	Phil Coulter	
1976	Jo Plée	
1977	Johnny Arthey	
1978	Rolf Soja	
1979	Hervé Roy	
1980	Norbert Daum	
1981	Joël Rocher	
1982	Jean Claudric	
1983	Michel Bernholc	
1984	Pascal Stive	
1985	Norbert Daum	
1986	Rolf Soja	
1987	Alec Mansion	
1988	Régis Dupré	
1989	Benoît Kaufman	
1990	Thierry Durbet	
1991	Francis Goya	
1992	Christian Jacob	
1993	Francis Goya	

=== Jury members ===
Each participating broadcaster assembles a five-member jury panel consisting of music industry professionals for the Eurovision Song Contest, ranking all entries except their own. The modern incarnation of jury voting was introduced beginning with the 2009 contest, and as of 2023, the juries' votes constitute 50% of the overall result in the final alongside televoting.

Jury members
Year	Jurors					Ref.
2024	Vanessa Cum	Patrick Greis	Germain Leon Martin	Alfred Nicolas Medernach	Irem Sosay	
2025	Tom Gatti	Tom Leick-Burns	Monique Melsen	Catherine Nothum	Jules Serrig	

=== Commentators and spokespersons ===
RTL has broadcast the contest on various television and radio channels during its participation history and has provided commentary in different languages for the local audiences. On occasion commentary has been relayed from the broadcast feed of other participating countries. Between 1956 and 1991 the contest was broadcast on the French-language television channel of RTL (presently known as RTL9), and was also broadcast on the German-language television channel (previously known as RTL plus, now titled RTL) between 1984 and 1988; in 1992 and 1993 the contest was broadcast on the Luxembourgish-language channel RTL Hei Elei. The contest is also known to have been broadcast on RTL's radio stations, in 1966 on the French-language Radio Luxembourg, in 1962 and 1973 on the Luxembourgish-language Radio Luxembourg, in 1973 on the English-language Radio Luxembourg, and in 1979 on the German-language RTL Radio. Upon its return to the contest in 2024, RTL provided a wide array of broadcast options through television, radio and online streaming, with English, French and Luxembourgish language commentators recruited to provide context during the live shows.

As part of the contest's voting procedure, each participating broadcaster nominates a spokesperson which announces the results of their country's vote during the final. Since 1994, the year Luxembourg began its most recent hiatus from the contest, the spokespersons have been connected through satellite links, which replaced the use of telephone lines in previous events. Désirée Nosbusch, who had previously hosted the 1984 contest, served as Luxembourg's spokesperson upon the country's return in 2024, and thus became the first Luxembourgish spokesperson to be seen in vision during the contest.

Television commentators and spokespersons (1956–1993)
Year	Channel(s)	Commentator(s)	Spokesperson	Ref.
1956	Télé-Luxembourg	Unknown	No spokesperson	
1957	Télé-Luxembourg	Robert Beauvais (Note: Commentary provided by France's RTF)	Unknown	
1958	Télé-Luxembourg	Unknown	Unknown	
1959	Télé-Luxembourg	Unknown	Did not participate	
1960	Télé-Luxembourg	Unknown	Unknown	
1961	Télé-Luxembourg	Robert Beauvais	Unknown	
1962	Télé-Luxembourg	Unknown	Unknown	
1963	Télé-Luxembourg	Pierre Tchernia	Unknown	
1964	Télé-Luxembourg	Robert Beauvais	Unknown	
1965	Télé-Luxembourg	Unknown	Unknown	
1966	Télé-Luxembourg	Unknown	Camillo Felgen (Note: Confirmed by host Josiane Shen during the broadcast.)	
1967	Télé-Luxembourg	Unknown	Paul Ulveling	
1968	Télé-Luxembourg	Unknown	Unknown	
1969	Télé-Luxembourg	Unknown	Unknown	
1970	Télé-Luxembourg	Unknown	Unknown	
1971	Télé-Luxembourg	Unknown	No spokesperson	
1972	Télé-Luxembourg	Jacques Navadic	No spokesperson	
1973	RTL Télé-Luxembourg	Unknown	No spokesperson	
1974	RTL Télé-Luxembourg	Unknown	Unknown	
1975	RTL Télé-Luxembourg	Unknown	Unknown	
1976	RTL Télé-Luxembourg	Jacques Navadic	Jacques Harvey	
1977	RTL Télé-Luxembourg	Unknown	Unknown	
1978	RTL Télé-Luxembourg	Jacques Navadic and André Torrent	Unknown	
1979	RTL Télé-Luxembourg	Unknown	Unknown	
1980	RTL Télé-Luxembourg	Jacques Navadic	Jacques Harvey	
1981	RTL Télé-Luxembourg	Jacques Navadic and Marylène Bergmann	Unknown	
1982	RTL Télé-Luxembourg	Jacques Navadic and Marylène Bergmann	Unknown	
1983	RTL Télévision	Valérie Sarn	Unknown	
1984	RTL Télévision, RTL plus	Valérie Sarn (RTL Télévision); Unknown (RTL plus)	Unknown	
1985	RTL Télévision, RTL plus	Valérie Sarn (RTL Télévision); Oliver Spiecker (RTL plus)	Unknown	
1986	RTL Télévision, RTL plus	Unknown (RTL Télévision); Matthias Krings (RTL plus)	Unknown	
1987	RTL Télévision, RTL plus	Frédérique Ries (RTL Télévision); Matthias Krings (RTL plus)	Unknown	
1988	RTL Télévision, RTL-TVI, RTL plus	Valérie Sarn (RTL Télévision, RTL-TVI); Unknown (RTL plus)	Unknown	
1989	RTL Télévision	Unknown	Jean-Luc Bertrand	
1990	RTL Télévision	Valérie Sarn	Unknown	
1991	RTL TV, RTL Lorraine	Unknown	Jean-Luc Bertrand	
1992	RTL Hei Elei	Romain Goerend	Maurice Molitor	
1993	RTL Hei Elei	Romain Goerend	Maurice Molitor	

Commentators and spokespersons (2024–present)
Year	Luxembourgish			English			French			Spokesperson	Ref.
Year	Channel(s)	Show(s)	Commentator(s)	Channel(s)	Show(s)	Commentator(s)	Channel(s)	Show(s)	Commentator(s)	Spokesperson	Ref.
2024	RTL, RTL Radio	All shows	Raoul Roos and Roger Saurfeld	RTL Today	All shows	Sarah Tapp and Meredith Moss	RTL Infos	SF/Final	Jerôme Didelot and Emma Sorgato	Désirée Nosbusch	
2025	RTL Lëtzebuerg	All shows	Raoul Roos and Roger Saurfeld	RTL Today	SF/Final	Melissa Dalton and Meredith Moss	RTL Infos	SF/Final	Fabien Rodrigues and Jérôme Didelot	Fabienne Zwally	
2026	RTL Lëtzebuerg	All shows	Raoul Roos and Roger Saurfeld	RTL Today	SF/Final	Melissa Dalton and Meredith Moss	RTL Infos	SF/Final	Jérôme Didelot and Charlotte Gomez	Hana Sofia Lopes	

=== Creative directors ===
As part of the broadcaster's delegation team, a creative director may be employed to provide guidance on the staging of the competing entry at the Eurovision Song Contest. In 2024, RTL collaborated with the Ukrainian director Herman Nenov on the staging of the Luxembourgish entry in Malmö. In 2025, the staging was designed by the Ukrainian team TRI.Direction, led by Nataliia Lysenkova, Nataliia Rovenska and Mariia Hryhorashchenko, with choreography by Denys Stulnikov.

== Photo gallery ==
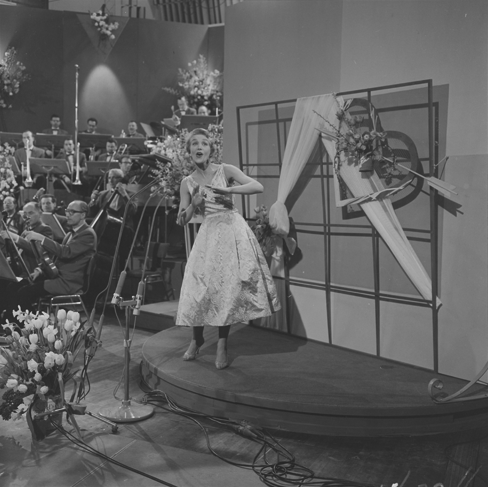
Solange Berry in Hilversum (1958)

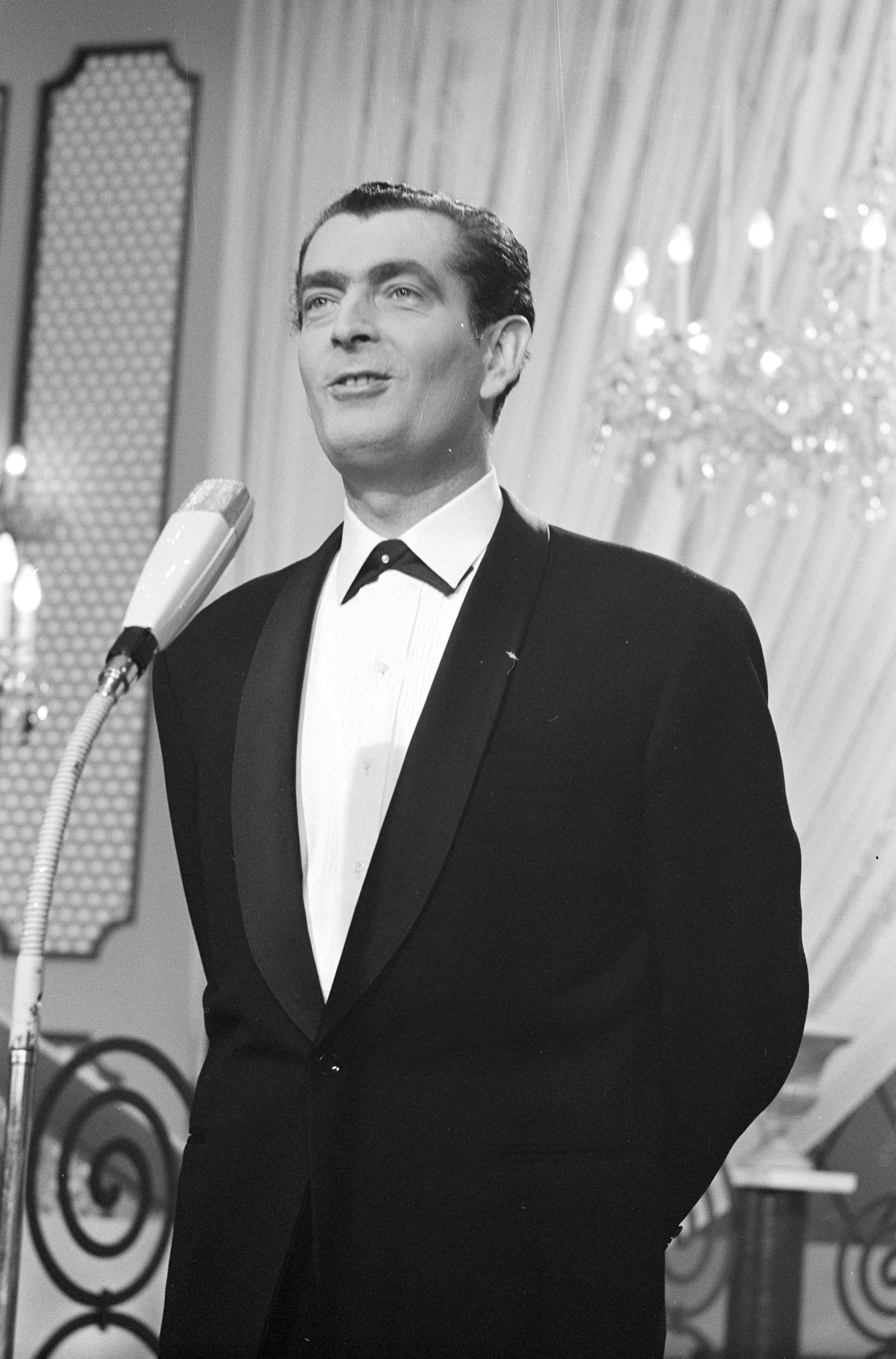
Camillo Felgen in Luxembourg (1962)

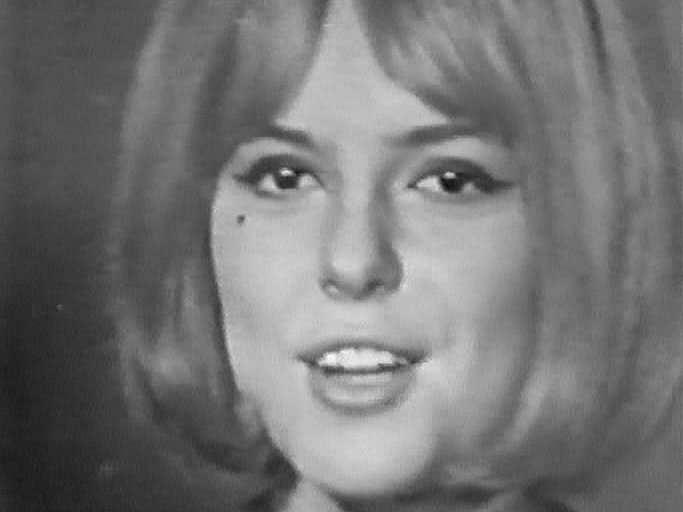
France Gall in Naples (1965)

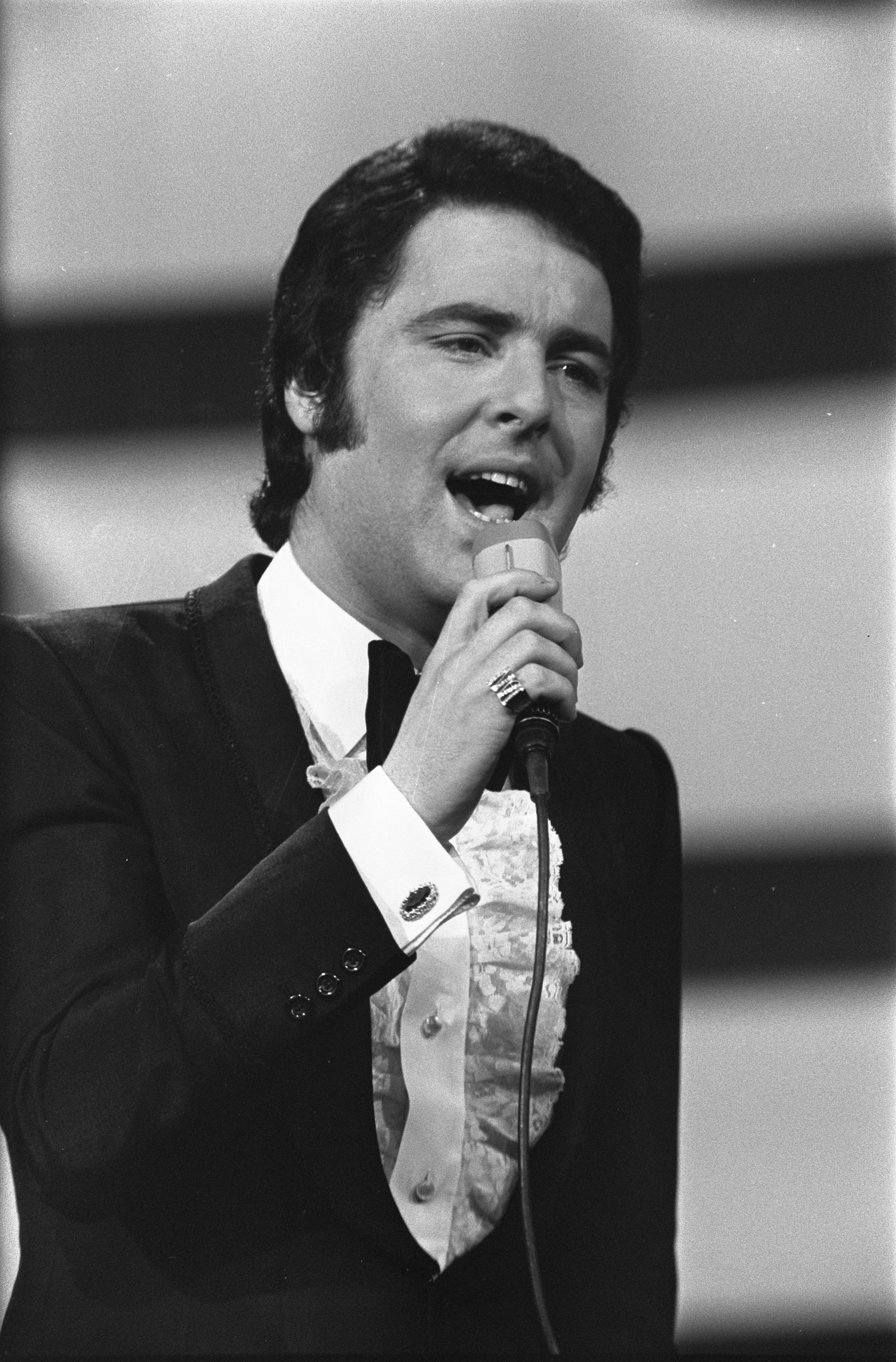
David Alexandre Winter in Amsterdam (1970)

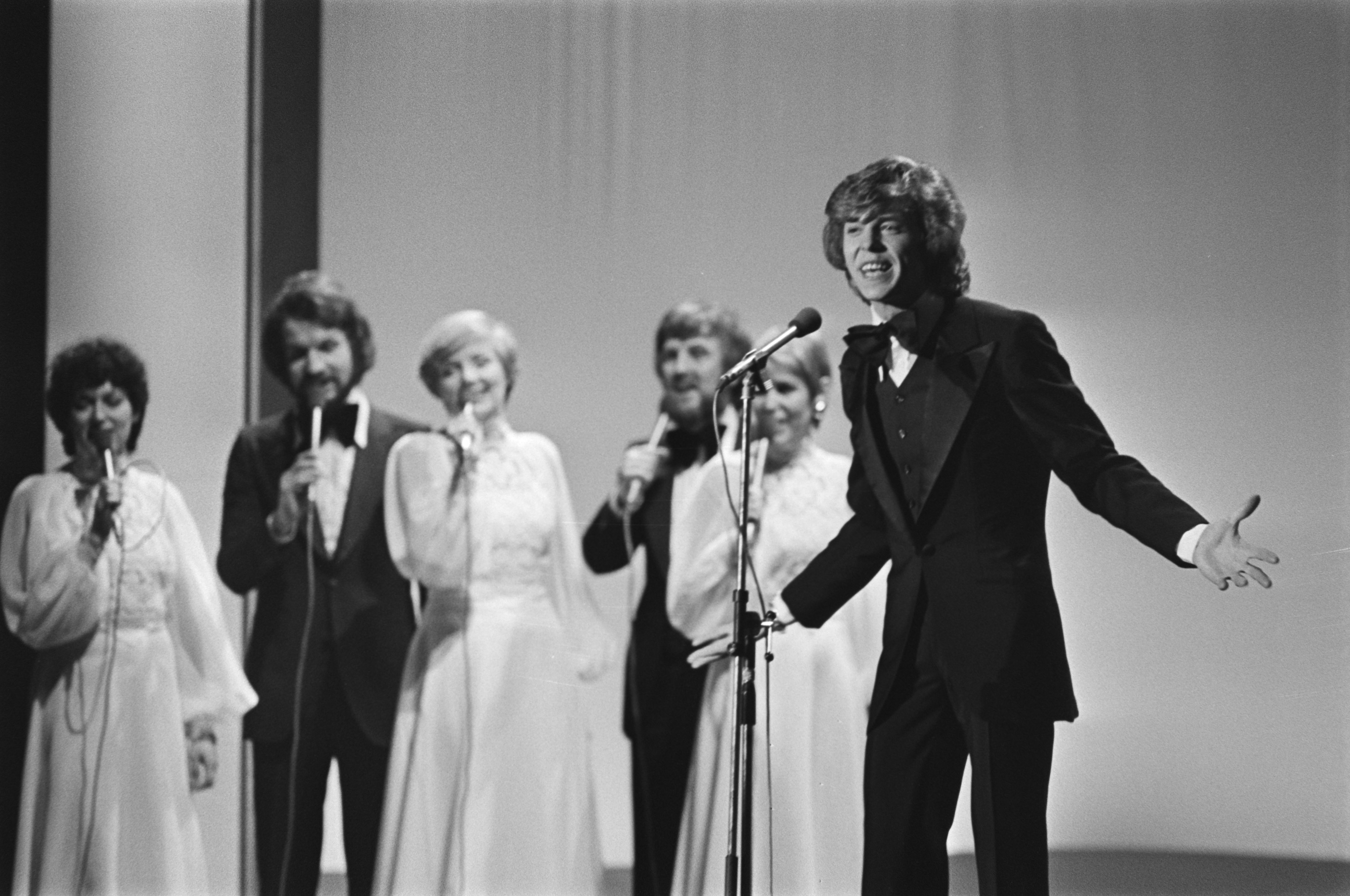
Jürgen Marcus in The Hague (1976)

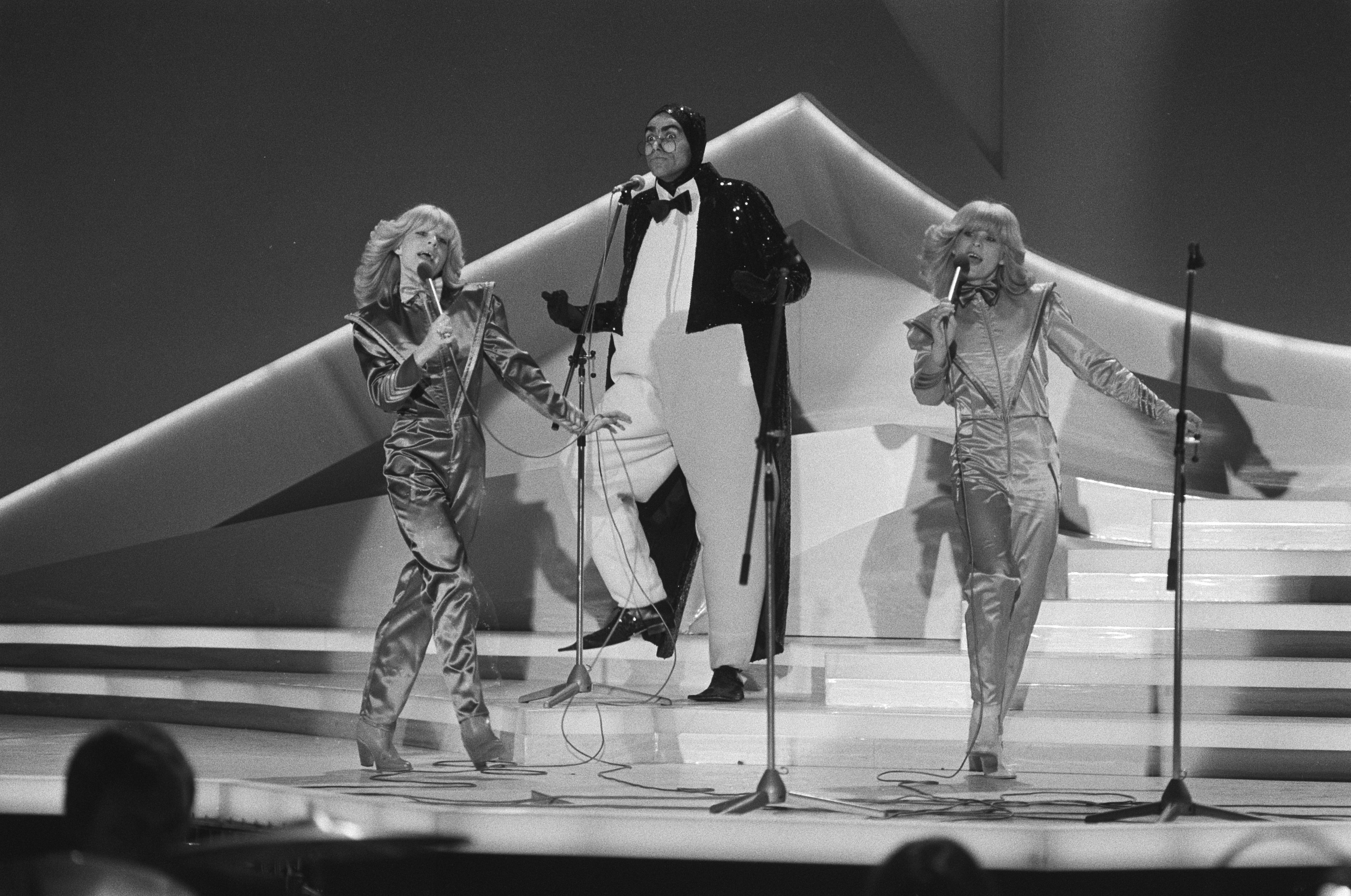
Sophie and Magaly in the Hague (1980)

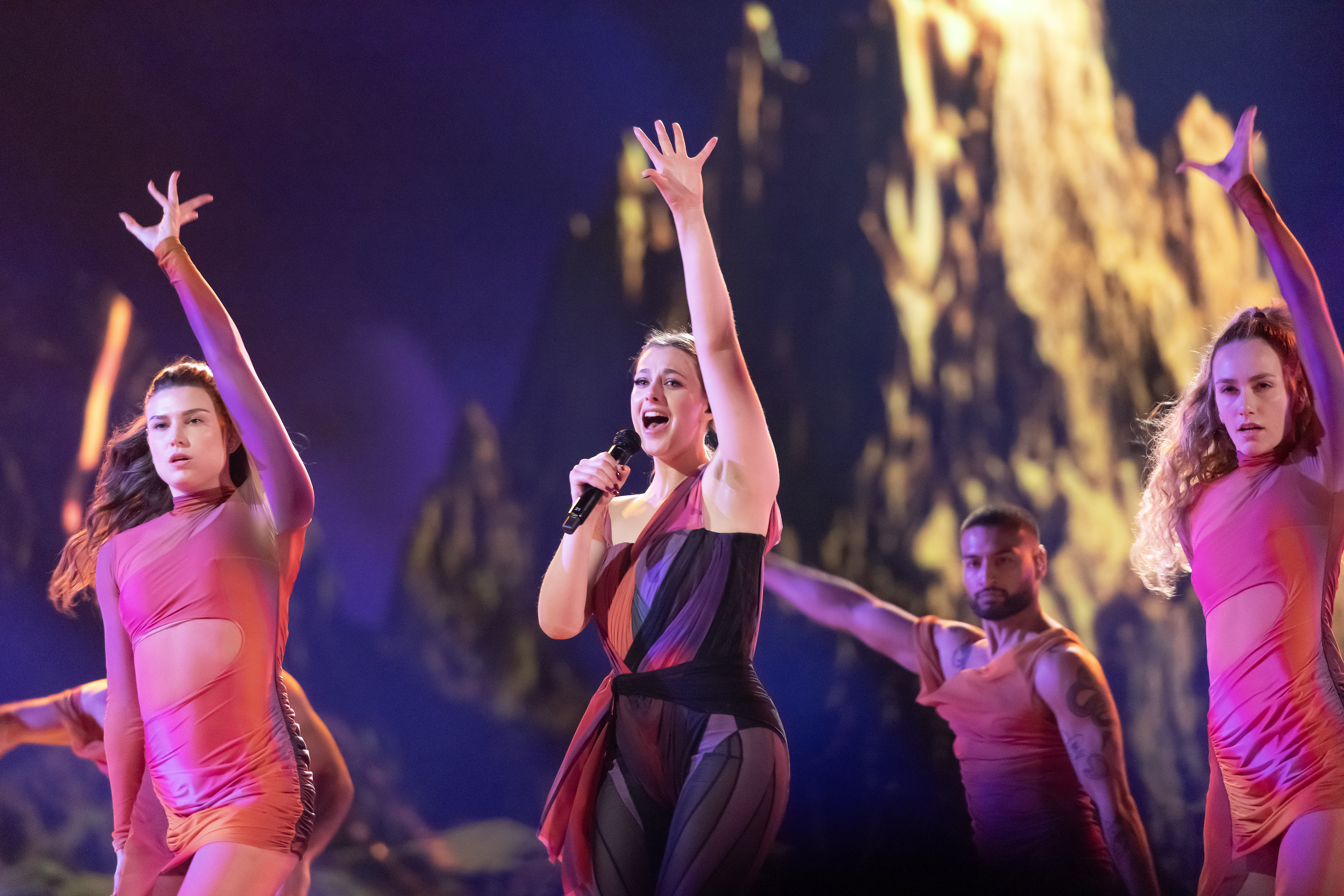
Tali in Malmö (2024)

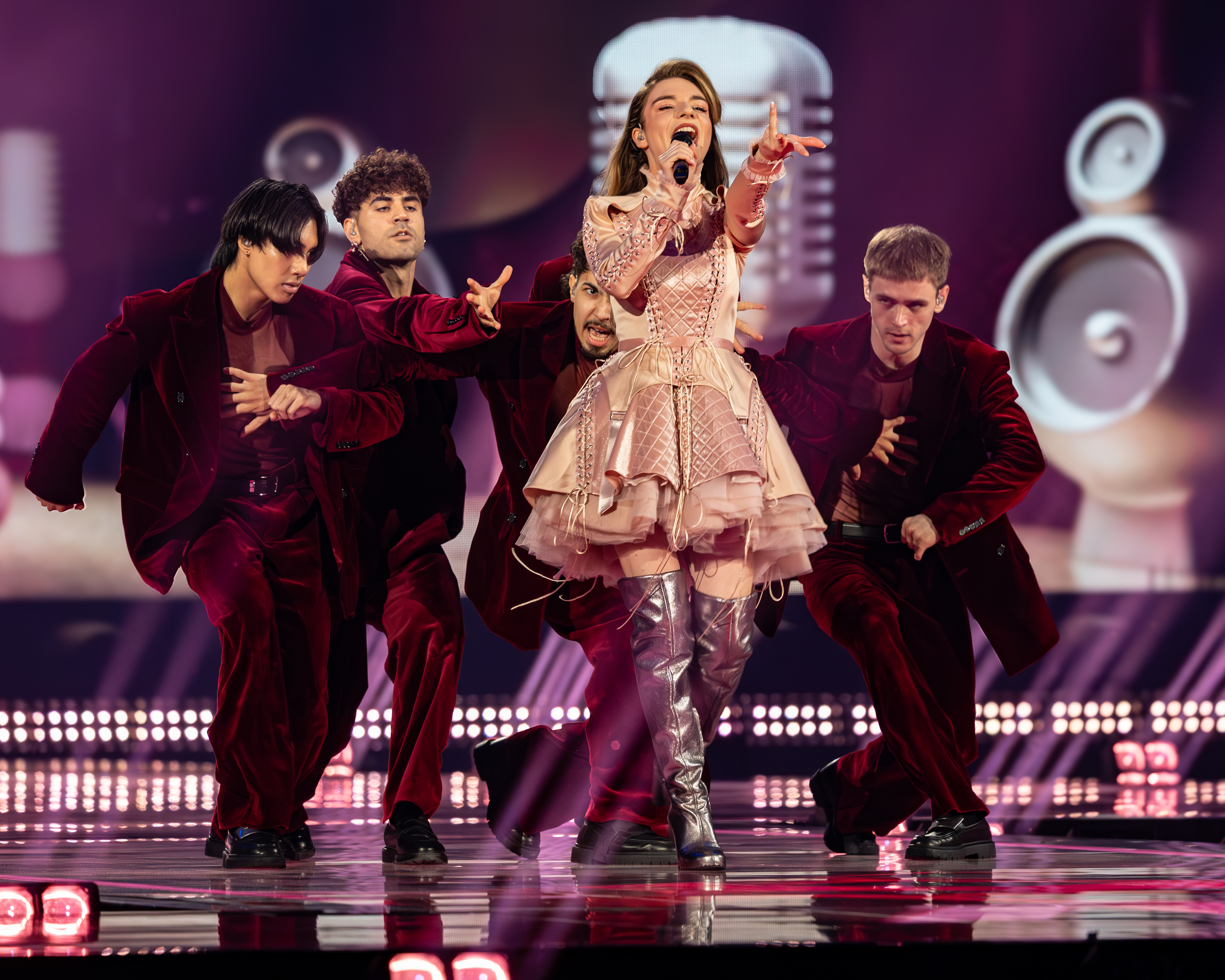
Laura Thorn in Basel (2025)

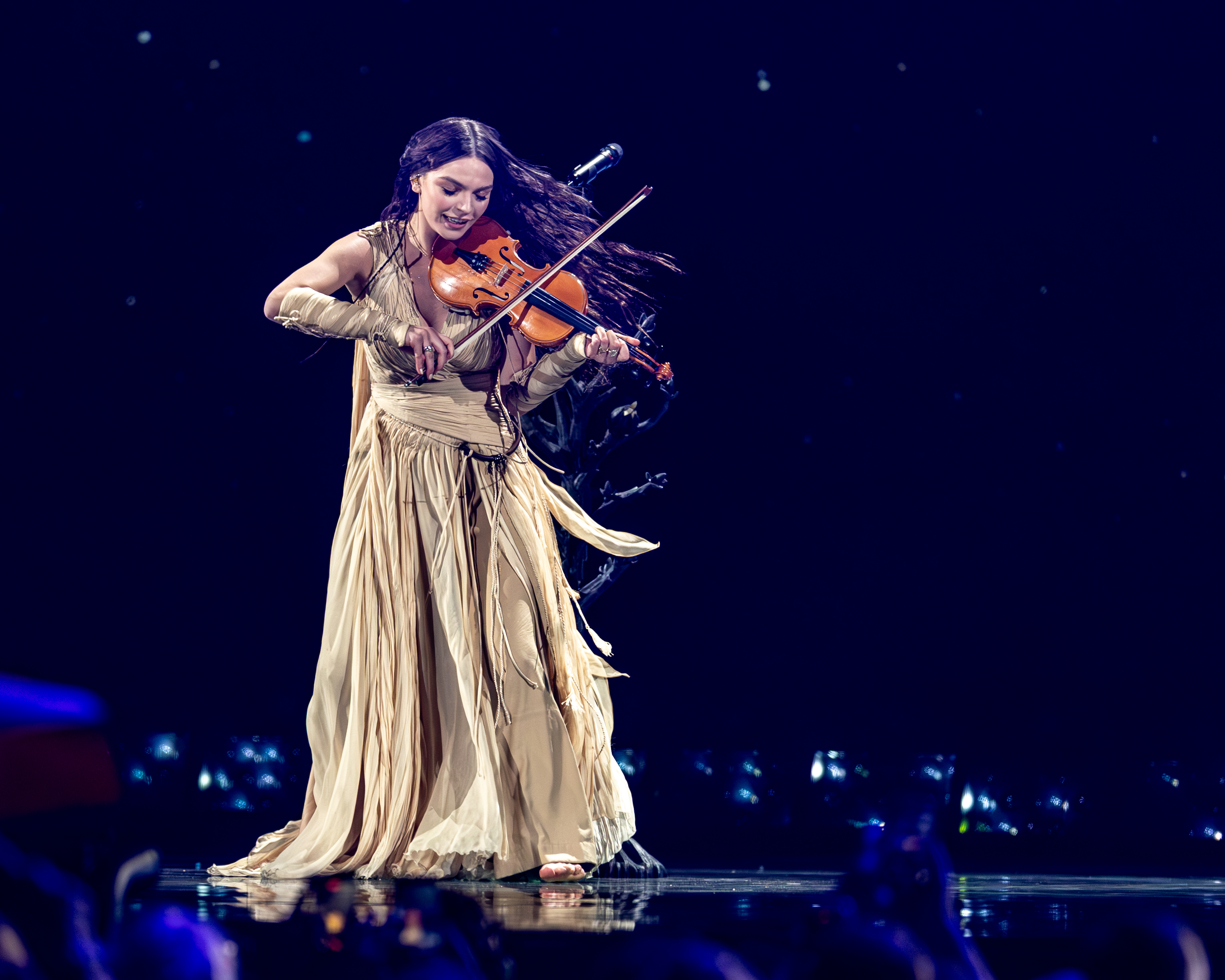
Eva Marija in Vienna (2026)
