= David Alexandre Winter =

Dutch-born, international pop singer (born 1943)

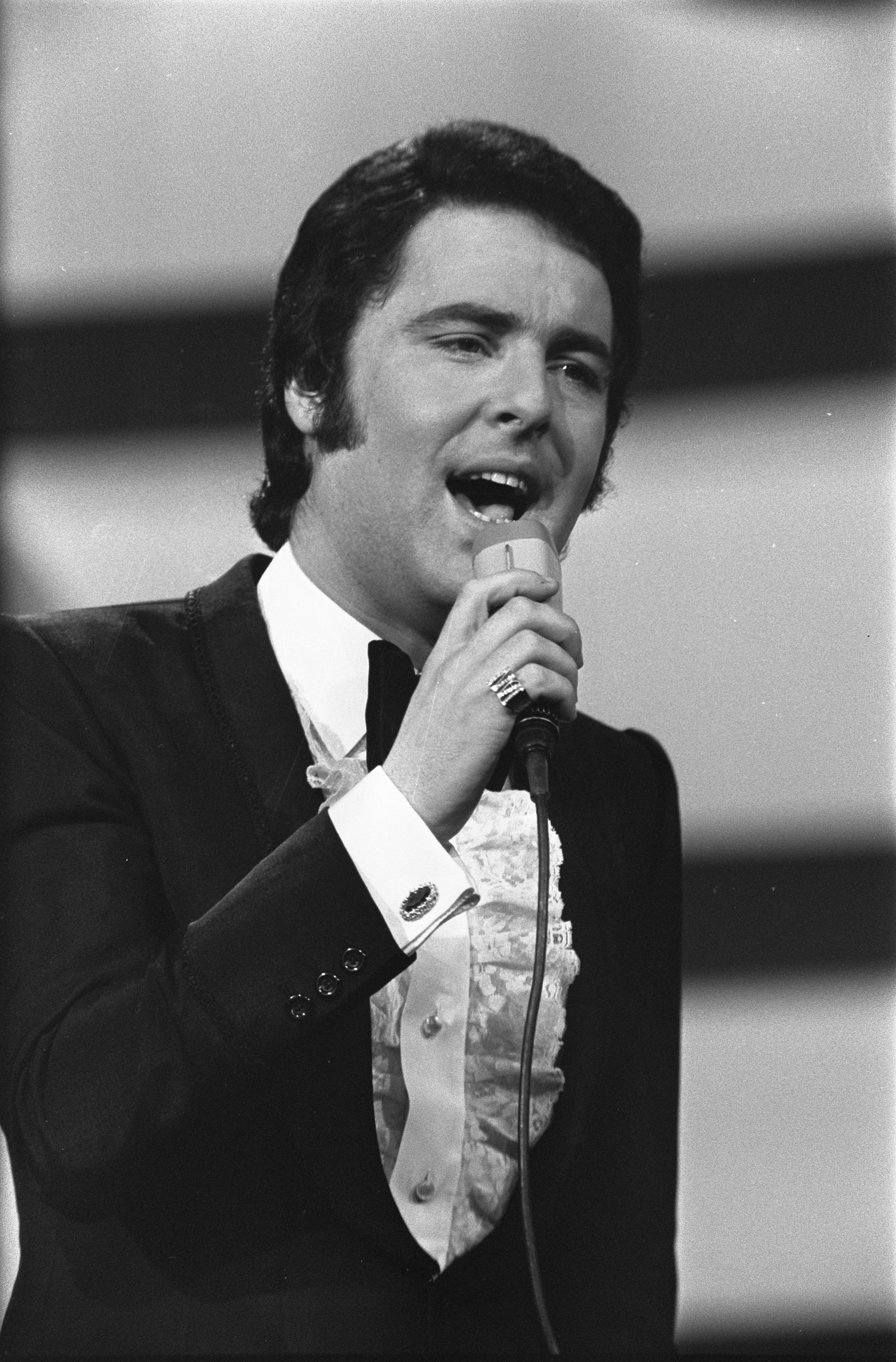
- David Alexandre Winter at the Eurovision Song Contest 1970

Background information
- Also known as: John van Doren / Johnnie Van Doren
- Born: Lion Kleerekoper; 4 April 1943 (age 83); Amsterdam, Netherlands
- Origin: Netherlands
- Genres: French Pop
- Occupations: Singer, songwriter
- Years active: 1966 – present
- Formerly of: Daddy's Act

David Alexandre Winter (born Lion Kleerekoper; 4 April 1943) is a Dutch-born international pop singer. Winter found fame in Luxembourg and France.

== Early life ==
Winter was born in Amsterdam, Netherlands into a Jewish family. Both he and his parents, Israel Kleerekoper and Magdalena Kleerekoper, née Blocq, were deported to different Nazi concentration camps during the German occupation of the Netherlands. After the end of the war, the family was reunited.

== Career ==
From 1966 to 1968 Winter was the lead singer for The Hague-based band "Daddy's Act". One of his first recordings was a cover of the Beatles hit "Eight Days A Week". Under the name Johnny van Dooren, he was a DJ at Dutch pirate station Radio Veronica and later at Radio 227, an English pirate radio station in the North Sea. During 1967–68, he also recorded two singles in Dutch for the Philips label. In early 1968 while living in London he represented England at the Innsbruck Song Festival in Austria, where he obtained first prize and the coveted ‘'prix de press'’.

He left England where he resided at the time to go to Paris, and was discovered by Leo Missir from Riviera Records (an affiliate of the Barclay group). In January 1969, his debut single, "Oh Lady Mary", was released; and by April 1969 it had sold 750,000, and one million sales were achieved by August in France, where it was number one for 36 weeks and in the Top 10 for nine months. Total sales for the first single resulted in 2,6 million copies sold. It was also a hit by David, in Italy (#4), Spain (#5), Germany (#2), Netherlands (# 5), Belgium (#1). In total it sold over 6.5. million copies throughout Europe. The song was written by Patricia Carli and Turkish composer Metin Bükey, and also became a hit in 1970 for Austria's Peter Alexander (number one for four weeks). Winter went on to record 10 albums and 42 singles & E.P.'s, of which 9 titles became No. 1 hits in France, Belgium, Netherlands, Italy, Spain and Germany. Songs like: "Vole s’Envole" (#1 1.650.000 sold in France, 750,000 in Italy, and 1.200. million in Holland, Germany, Spain and Scandinavia.)/"Je suis tombé du ciel" (# 3. 850,000 sold, Luxemburg's entry for the 1970 Eurovision Song Contest in Amsterdam, finishing last).

He also recorded in all those languages, and scored two number 1 hits in Germany: "Schau Schau Hinter Den Dunen" and "Ohne Dich war es Halb So Schoen" In total David-Alexandre Winter sold well over 26 million records over his 10-year career in France and the rest of Europe, and performed on the most prestigious stages in all of Europe: The Bolchoi Theater in Moscow, the Royal Command Performance for Queen Elizabeth of England at the Royal Albert Hall in London, as well as the Gala of the Red Cross for Prince Rainier and Grace Kelly in Monte Carlo.

In 1980, Winter moved to the United States. He recorded and produced an album for the Canadian independent company Isba Records and released a single entitled "L'Étoile du Berger".

In 2010, Winter returned to the stage in France for a revival tour with "Age Tendre & Têtes de Bois", which tour played for 55 sold-out venues with well over 550,000 people seeing him in concert. In 2014, Winter recorded a studio album Winter Country in Nashville, Tennessee.

== Private life ==
He was first married in 1964 in Amsterdam and had a daughter called Debby. Then Winter lived together with French fashion model Catherine Fefeu in the early 1970s. They had two children, Ophélie Winter (born 1974) and Michael Winter. Ophélie became a model, actress and pop singer in her own right, producing four albums between 1996 and 2009. Michael, her brother wrote and produced the songs that made her famous. David and Catherine went their separate ways in 1974.

Preceded by Romuald	Luxembourg in the Eurovision Song Contest; 1970	Succeeded by Monique Melsen
