= Monique Melsen =

Luxembourgish singer (born 1951)

- Born: 24 February 1951 (age 74)
- Origin: Ettelbruck, Luxembourg
- Genres: Pop
- Occupation: Singer

Monique Melsen (born 24 February 1951) is a Luxembourgish singer, best known for her participation in the 1971 Eurovision Song Contest. Melsen is one of only ten native Luxembourgers to have represented the country at Eurovision in its 39 participations.

== Background ==
As was usual with Luxembourg, Melsen's Eurovision song, "Pomme, pomme, pomme" ("Apple, Apple, Apple"), was chosen internally by broadcaster Télé Luxembourg without having to go through a public or jury selection process. "Pomme, pomme, pomme" went to the 16th Eurovision Song Contest, held on 3 April in Dublin, where it finished in 13th place of 18 entries.

In recent years, Melsen has been a member of Cabarenert, a Luxembourg-based cabaret ensemble.

Preceded by David Alexandre Winter	Luxembourg in the Eurovision Song Contest; 1971	Succeeded by Vicky Leandros
