= Sophie and Magaly =

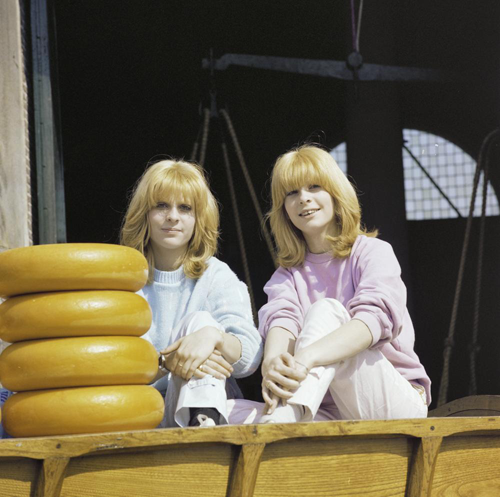
- Sophie and Magaly in 1980

Background information
- Born: Sophie Gilles; Magaly Gilles; 24 August 1962; Neuilly-sur-Seine, France
- Died: Magaly: 2 April 1996 (aged 33); Sophie: 27 February 2019 (aged 56)
- Genres: Pop
- Instrument: Vocals
- Years active: 1980–1981
- Labels: Ariola

Sophie and Magaly were a French musical duo composed of twin sisters Sophie (24 August 1962 – 27 February 2019) and Magaly Gilles-Giovannoni (24 August 1962 – 2 April 1996). The duo are best known for representing Luxembourg in the Eurovision Song Contest 1980 with the song "Papa Pingouin", placing ninth. However, the song was a commercial success in France, where over one million copies of the single were sold. Their second single, "Arlequin", sold poorly, and their German producer Ralph Siegel of the label Ariola dropped them from the label shortly thereafter. Producer Charles Talar subsequently gave them a second chance, however, their follow-up singles "Toi" and "Les nanas de Zorro" were equally unsuccessful, and the group disbanded shortly thereafter.

In the late 1980s, Magaly contracted HIV, and died of AIDS in April 1996. Sophie suffered from high depressive syndrome and lived in the south of France. She died in 2019.

== Discography ==
- 1980 - "Papa Pingouin"
- 1980 - "Arlequin"
- 1980 - "Sophie, Magaly"
- 1980 - "Tous les enfants du monde"
- 1981 - "Les Nanas de Zorro"
- 1981 - "Poupée qui chante, poupée que pleure"
- 1981 - "Toi"
- 1981 - "Tous les enfants chantent Noël"

Preceded by Jeane Manson with "J'ai déjà vu ça dans tes yeux"	Luxembourg in the Eurovision Song Contest; 1980	Succeeded by Jean-Claude Pascal with "C'est peut-être pas l'Amérique"
