= Corinne Hermès =

French singer (born 1961)

- Also known as: Corinne Bondeaux; Corinne Miller
- Born: 16 November 1961 (age 63); Lagny-sur-Marne, Seine-et-Marne, France
- Genres: Chanson; pop
- Occupation: Singer-songwriter
- Instrument: Vocals
- Years active: 1974–present
- Labels: Marianne Melodie
- Website: www.corinnehermes.com

Corinne Hermès (born Corinne Bondeaux; 16 November 1961) is a French singer. She represented Luxembourg at the Eurovision Song Contest 1983 where she won with "Si la vie est cadeau" ("If life is a gift"), which brought the Grand Duchy its fifth and hitherto final victory.

== Biography ==
Corinne's career began in 1974 when she won a singing contest in Roquebrune-sur-Argens. Five years later, during the recording of her single La ville où je vis / Le blouson gris, the composer and producer Bernard Estardy heard her voice and offered her the leading female role in his upcoming musical comedy, 36 Front populaire, where she would have appeared alongside Julien Clerc. A double album of songs from the musical was released, but the musical was never staged for political considerations – the satirical jabs at a left-wing government were ill-timed given the centre-right government in France of the time.

In 1983, Corinne was selected internally by RTL to represent Luxembourg in the 28th Eurovision Song Contest, held in Munich, Germany. Her song, Si la vie est cadeau, composed by Jean-Pierre Millers and with lyrics from Alain Garcia, was performed last on the night and received 142 points, with maximum points from 6 competitors. This was enough to bring Luxembourg their fifth and final victory to date, with a slender margin of only 6 points over the runner-up, Israel's Ofra Haza. This victory tied Luxembourg with France for the most number of wins, until Ireland overtook both in the mid-90s. It was the twelfth French language song in 28 editions to win, but since, only two Francophone entries have won. Her winning song spent nine weeks in the French top 10, peaking at No. 4 a week after the contest, but other than a short spell in the top 20 in Sweden and Switzerland, it was the first Eurovision winner since the early 1960s to not achieve notable commercial success in another country, despite also having recorded versions in both German and English.

After her victory, Corinne announced a new album, but only two songs – Vivre à deux and Michaël – were released, and soon after, her producer Haim Saban left for the United States. In 1986, she released the single Ma liberté and in 1989, regained success with Dessine-moi, which reached the top 20 in France and peaked at No. 2 in the Francophone Belgian charts. Subsequently, Corinne received recognition as Best female révélation (newcomer) in the 1990 Victoires de la Musique, musical awards presented by the French Ministry of Culture, a decision that caused controversy given that the song had first been published ten years prior.

In 1993, she recorded the song L'amour est artiste, composed by François Valéry, for use as the theme tune to the TF1 drama Les Grandes Marées. In 2000, she was invited to represent France in the international jury that chose Estonia's entry for the Eurovision Song Contest 2000. The following year, she presented the points of the French vote in the Eurovision Song Contest 2001.

In 2006, she released a new album, Vraie, in partnership with Chérie FM and Fnac. From that album, two new singles were released: S'il n'y avait pas les mots and On vit comme on aime, the latter of which with a music video featuring the Corsican-born Belgian comedian François Vincentelli. A previously unreleased song, Seule sans toi, was included in the compilation album I love you in Beautiful Paris in 2009, and Corinne released a best-of compilation of her own in 2012. Her latest album to date, Intemporelle was released in 2019 and is a selection of 10 covers of famous French and international songs.

Awards and achievements
| Preceded by (Germany) Nicole with "Ein bißchen Frieden" | Winner of the Eurovision Song Contest; 1983 | Succeeded by (Sweden) Herreys with "Diggi-Loo Diggi-Ley" |
| Preceded by Svetlana with "Cours après le temps" | Luxembourg in the Eurovision Song Contest; 1983 | Succeeded by Sophie Carle with "100% d'amour" |
