= Vicky Leandros =

Greek singer (born 1949)

- Βίκυ Λέανδρος
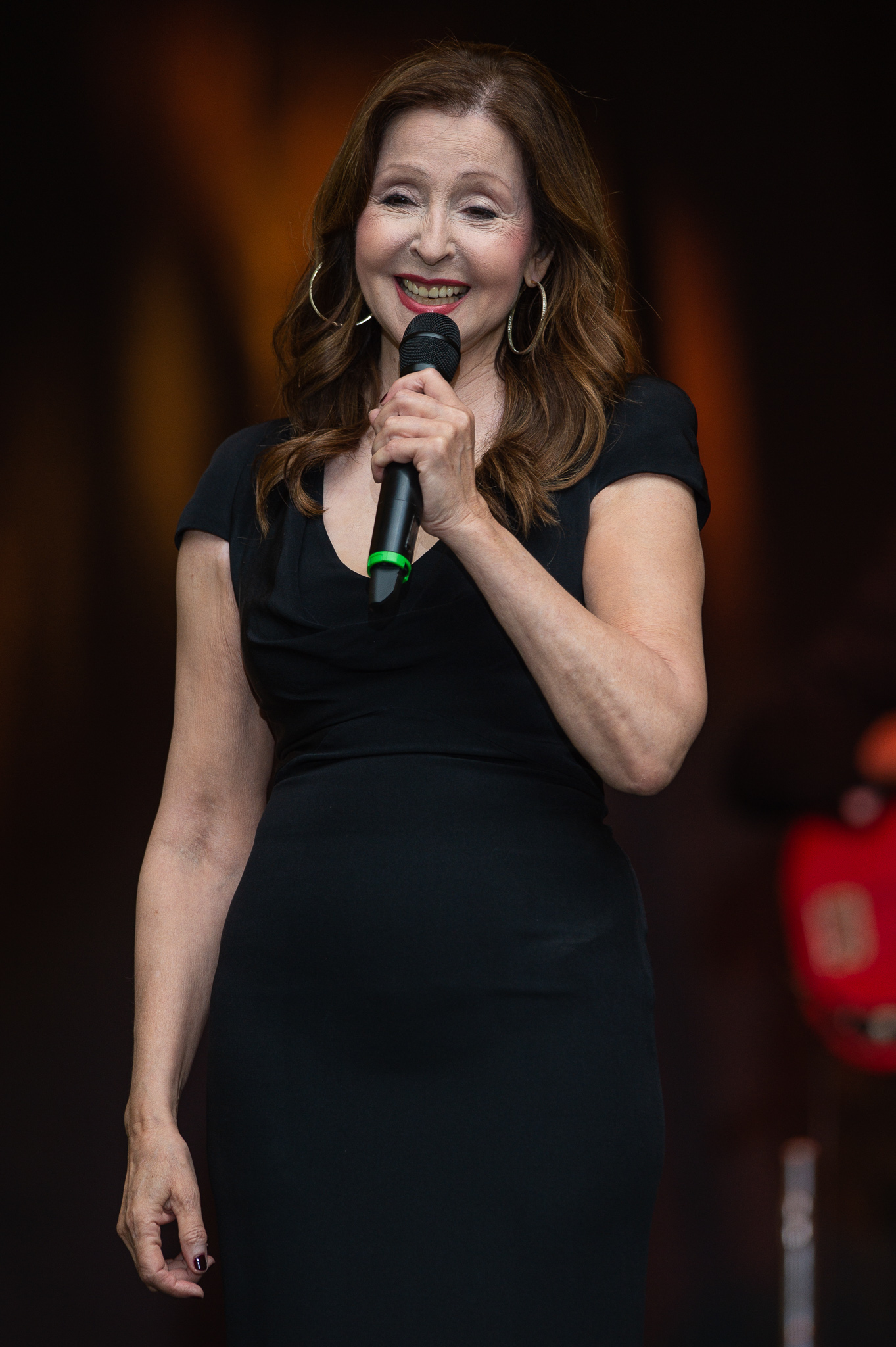
- Vicky Leandros in Franken, 2018
- Born: Vasiliki Papathanasiou; 23 August 1949 (age 77); Palaiokastritsa, Kingdom of Greece
- Known for: L'amour est bleu; Apres toi
- Musical career
- Also known as: Vicky Leandros
- Genre: Pop
- Occupations: Singer; politician
- Years active: 1965–present
- Website: Official website

Vasiliki Papathanasiou (Greek: Βασιλική Παπαθανασίου, IPA: [vasiliˈci papaθanaˈsi.u]; born 23 August 1949), known professionally as Vicky Leandros (Greek: Βίκυ Λέανδρος, IPA: [ˈvici ˈle.anðros]), is a Greek-German singer. She is the daughter of singer, musician and composer Leandros Papathanasiou (also known as Leo Leandros as well as Mario Panas). In 1967, she achieved worldwide fame after gaining fourth place for the country of Luxembourg in the Eurovision Song Contest with the song "L'amour est bleu", which became a worldwide hit. She further established her career by winning the Eurovision Song Contest in 1972 with the song "Après toi", again representing Luxembourg.

On 15 October 2006, Vicky Leandros was elected town councillor of the Greek harbour town of Piraeus on the PASOK list. Her task concerned the cultural and international development of Piraeus. She was also Deputy Mayor of Piraeus. It was announced in June 2008 that Leandros decided to leave her position in Greek politics with immediate effect, stating that she had underestimated the workload and time needed to fulfill her political obligations and that it had become impossible to combine those duties with her singing career.

== Musical career ==
Vasiliki Papathanasiou was born on 23 August 1949 in Palaiokastritsa. In 1958, her parents took her to West Germany where she stayed with her father permanently after her parents' divorce. She revealed her talent at a young age while taking on worldwide hits of the year and was covered by other artists. She was shortly singing in eight languages with her albums, singles and EPs being sold all over the world.

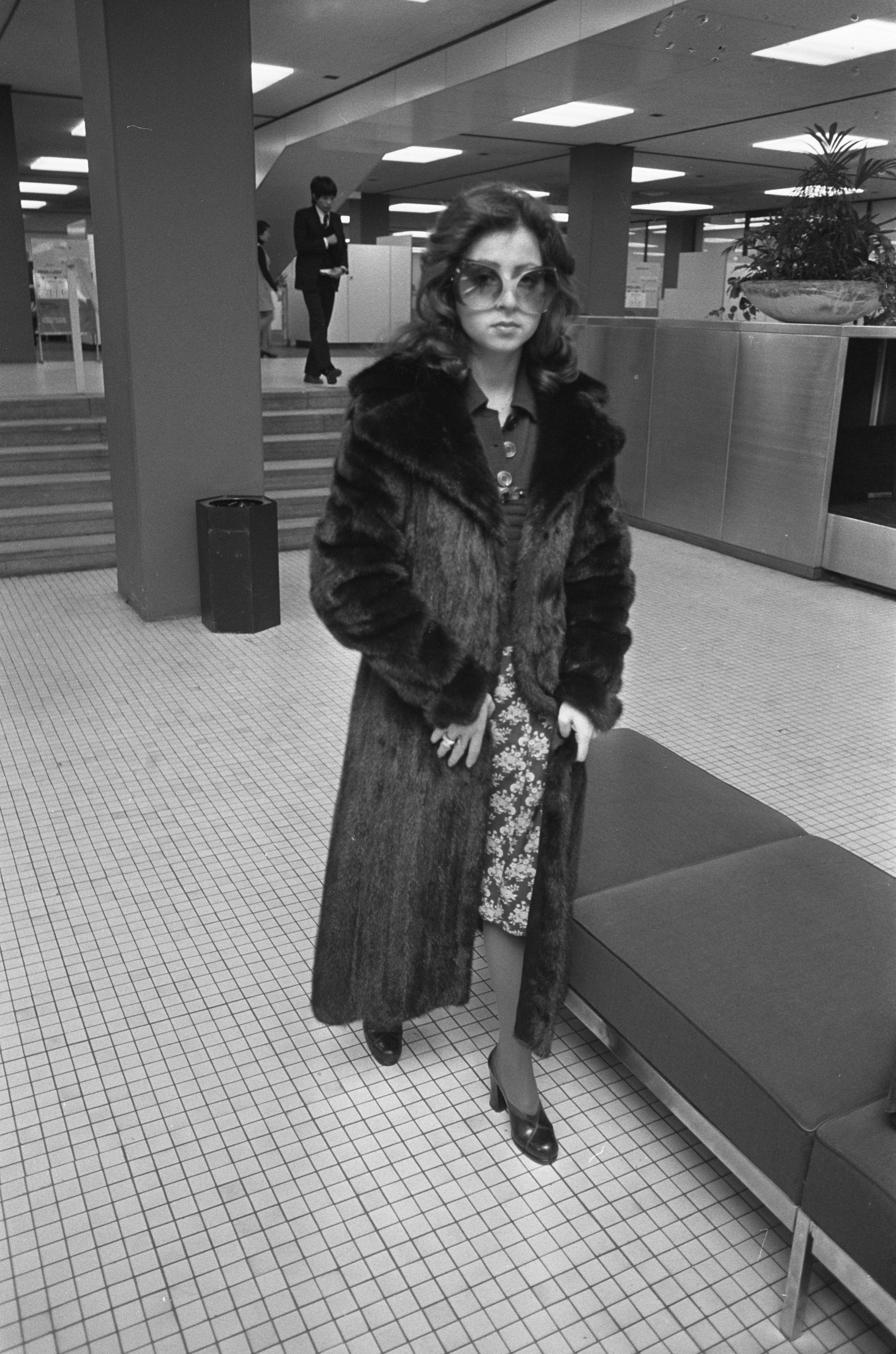
Vicky Leandros at Amsterdam Airport Schiphol in 1973

In 1970, her first TV show Ich Bin was broadcast in 13 European countries. It received many awards for being original thought-provoking contemporary graphics including in 1971 the world-famous Bronze Rose of Montreux. It was also the first time that Vicky used the same stage surname as her father (actually his real Christian name) and became known from then onwards as Vicky Leandros having been known simply as Vicky during the 1960s. Guests appearing were Julien Clerc and Deep Purple. The show has been repeated over the years and is seen as a classic piece very evocative of the era though at first it was not well received in all quarters owing to its surprising even shocking imagery in an age when songs were not generally accompanied by visuals for marketing purposes. Throughout the 1970s other film portraits by prominent film makers were to follow which attracted interest around the world. She later went on to host a television series in the UK for the BBC, entitled Music My Way.

In 1972, Leandros represented Luxembourg at Eurovision for the second time and won the contest with the song "Après toi". Translated into English as "Come What May", it was also a hit in the UK reaching #2 on the UK Singles Chart. The song peaked at number 23 in Australia. Globally it sold over six million copies and was awarded a gold disc. Leandros recorded the song in seven languages. Later that same year, Leandros released her version of the Theodorakis composition "O Kaymos (Sorrow, in Greek: Καημός) (The Love in Your Eyes)" which became a hit all over the world in various language versions. It peaked at #40 in the UK Singles Chart.

In 1973, "When Bouzoukis Played" became another massive selling world hit in several languages reaching #44 in the UK chart and #45 in Australia. In 1974, she recorded "Theo, wir fahr'n nach Lodz" - a song that was a #1 hit in Germany. She also found much success in South Africa during the 1970s.

In Japan, Leandros reached her peak during the late 1960s and early 1970s and recorded many times in Japanese. Her second Japanese single "Watashi no Sukina Chocolate" (The Chocolate That I Like) became a notable hit. She also recorded many cover versions of songs, "Mamy Blue", "You Don't Have To Say You Love Me" and "My Sweet Lord" among others.

In 1975, Leandros recorded the album entitled Across the Water in Nashville, Tennessee, and Miami, Florida. A departure from her previous works, it combined country, rock, and soul. The release was well-received by critics upon its release in the United States.

In 1976, Leandros signed a multimillion-dollar contract with CBS Records for albums to be released in the US market and started working in Hollywood, California with Kim Fowley but soon returned to Europe after CBS's support faltered.

After returning to Europe, Leandros released albums of various genres, including German folk music and Christmas songs. Her career showed signs of fading and she had her last top 20 hit in Germany with the song Kali Nichta. She recorded a Spanish-language album that gained her attention in Latin America. The first single, "Oh Mi Mama", was a minor hit, but the second single, "Tu Me Has Hecho Sentir”, although not promoted by Leandros or CBS due to differences between the two and a reported health scare, was a big hit in Spanish-speaking countries in 1979. It regularly appears on compilation albums and is easily the most famous and remembered song by Vicky Leandros in Spanish. A new album, Wie am Allerersten Tag went unreleased and Leandros became pregnant and took time off over the next 18 months.

In 1981, she recorded the album Love is Alive including duets with Demis Roussos, Johnny Hallyday and US star David Soul for a United Nations Benefit. She would also release the album Ich gehe neue Wege and its Greek version, Irtha Yia Sena that same year.

In 1982, by the success of the song "Verlorenes Paradies" from the same titled next album which saw Leandros back in the upper part of the singles charts in many territories after a few years absence. It was also recorded in Dutch.

In 1983 came the album Vicky containing the popular song and single Grüße an Sarah, which is regularly still sung in concerts often a cappella with the other musicians and vocalists making the sounds of the beats and instruments vocally to combine with Leandros's main vocal. Later that same year, Leandros recorded again in Dutch a song specially for the Dutch-speaking market; "Ver van het leven".

In 1984 the French version A l'Est d'Eden, was a big success in France reaching #2 on the singles chart. This single and corresponding album (Vicky) gave Leandros a notable comeback in Canada and she toured there after a gap of many years in 1985. Two more single releases from the album also became Canadian hits, those being Tu As Sept Ponts A Traverser and Salut Bien Sarah, the French version of Grueße an Sarah.

In 1985, Leandros would release another album, Eine Nacht in Griechenland. The album achieved Gold status in the Benelux and German speaking countries. Leandros took time off following the album's release to focus on her family.

In early 1988, Leandros returned with a new album, Ich bin ich. Working with Klaus "Nick" Munro, the album contained many new rhythms and was more rock- oriented than previous works. Leandros did not tour and made very limited appearances during this period concentrating mainly on her family life and her three young children. Nevertheless, two singles were released from the album, Du hast schon laengst Goodbye gesagt and a re-mixed version of Oh Oh Oh.

In 1989 she returned to her music career in Greece and charted with her comeback album Piretos tou Erota.

In 1990, Leandros released the album Starkes Gefühl which notably contained a new version of "Après toi", her Eurovision song contest winner of 1972. The album also contained the German version of Piretos tou erota, now Süchtig nach Geborgenheit which was the first single cut. The early 1990s saw her scoring successful albums in Greece and in Germany with Prosexe! Den Tha Kao Ksana(1991), Nur Einen Augenblick (1991), Andres (1993), with the singles Du Bist Mein Schönster Gedanke (1994), We’re Gonna Stay Together (1995),a duet with Tony Christie and the album Lieben Und Leben (1995).

The resurgence of popularity in Greece saw first the re-release on vinyl of Leandros's early albums (with different covers) and later a CD release of them all with bonus tracks.

From 1995 to 1998, Leandros collaborated with German hit-maker Jack White and released three Top-10 albums as well as the German version of the Titanic song My Heart Will Go On. This song Weil mein Herz dich nie mehr vergisst gave Leandros her highest-charting record since Verlorenes Paradies in 1982.

In 2000, Leandros started producing her own records. The album Jetzt / Now was a success and her own compositions received critical praise. Her duet with Chris De Burgh was one of the highlights of the album. Following this she featured again on the charts of several countries such as Canada, China, Japan, Belgium and South Africa due to the many greatest hits collections that several companies released.

In 2003, Leandros recorded a new album Tragoudi Alliotiko with songs by Mikis Theodorakis accompanied by the Kamerata Orchestra under Theodorakis's supervision. The album became a success in Germany, central Europe and in Greece. TV stations and tabloid newspaper reviewers celebrated her comeback, while other publications and reviewers questioned the rationale behind Leandros's performance of songs from a political composer like Theodorakis.

At around this time Leandros appeared in many TV shows on German and Greek television including galas with José Carreras. The album made it to the 100 best selling records of 2003, and Theodorakis wrote that he considered her, "among the two or three most important interpreters of [my] work".

In 2003, Leandros received two prestigious awards from the Greek government for her promotion of Greek culture and music abroad and another from the Greek Orthodox Church for her work for poor children in Africa. The latter award was presented to her at her classical concert held at the Herod Atticus amphitheatre in October 2003 and is the highest honour that the Greek Orthodox church can bestow.

Leandros is the only woman to date to be awarded such an honor. 2005 saw the release of a double album Ich Bin Wie Ich Bin containing new recordings of her songs. The album charted in Germany, Austria and Switzerland. Her Jubilee Tour of Europe started in February 2006. A month later she took part in the German pre-selection for the Eurovision Song Contest 34 years since Après toi. Her song Don't Break My Heart which had already entered the charts failed to win the most votes from the televoting public.

Leandros released a CD in March 2009 titled Möge der Himmel. This album contained soul elements combined with some R&B flavour, hip hop and rap. The change in direction was headline news and the album received mixed reviews.

The next album Zeitlos in 2010 returned to the idea born in 2008 of recording a collection of French songs and World hits in the German language. In 2011, she re-recorded her hit L'amour est Bleu as C'est Bleu for the Scooter album The Big Mash Up. The unusual collaboration was named a highlight of the record and was released as a single on 2 December 2011. A new studio album with the title Ich Weiss, Dass Ich Nichts Weiss was released on the Ariola label in 2015. The majority of the tracks contained were co-composed (music and lyrics) by Leandros. The themes of the songs are based to some extent on personal life experiences of the singer.

In 2024, Leandros retired from touring. On 24 November 2025, she was awarded the Bavarian Order of Merit from the Prime Minister of Bavaria Markus Soder, for her services to the arts and for her humanitarian work. She appeared in the first semi- final of the Eurovision Song Contest of 2026 in Vienna and sang, “L’amour est bleu”, the Eurovision song of 1967, that launched her worldwide career.

== Personal life ==
From 1982 to 1986, Leandros was married to Greek entrepreneur Ivan Zissiadis, the father of her son, Leandros Zissiadis (born 6 June 1980). She married Baron Enno von Ruffin, son of Freiherr(Baron) Franz von Ruffin in May 1986. Enno von Ruffin has owned and managed his country estate, Gut Basthorst, since 1982. In 2005, Leandros and von Ruffin separated after 19 years of marriage. They have two daughters: Maximiliane von Ruffin ("Milana"; born 31 January 1985) and Alessandra von Ruffin ("Sandra"; born 2 December 1986).

== Awards and collaborations ==
Leandros has received various awards including gold and platinum records from all around the world. She worked with many composers, producers and conductors. She was awarded with the "Bronze Rose of Montreux", "Goldene Europa", "Record Award of USA", and "Song Statue of Japan".

- 1967: Fourth place at the Eurovision with the song "L'amour est bleu“
- 1968: Goldene Europa
- 1971: Bronze Rose von Montreux for the TV-Show "Ich bin"
- 1971: Bronze Lion of the Radio Luxembourg
- 1972: First Place at the Eurovision with the song "Aprés toi“
- 1972: Best Selling Artist Internationally
- 1974: Goldene Europa
- 2001: Goldene Stimmgabel German pop
- 2001: Internationaler Schlagerpreis in the category of „Beste Künstlerin International“
- 2003: Hospitality Zeus
- 2005: Woman of the year in Greece
- 2009: Orinocoradio bubbling after hitsong "Theo wir fahr'n nach Lodz"
- 2011: Commander of the Order of Merit of the Grand Duchy of Luxembourg
- 2018: Orinocoradio bubbling after hitsong "Verloren zijn wij niet"
- 2025: Bavarian Order of Merit - for the arts and for humanitarian work

== Discography ==
Awards and achievements
Preceded by (Monaco) Séverine with "Un banc, un arbre, une rue"	Winner of the Eurovision Song Contest; 1972	Succeeded by (Luxembourg) Anne-Marie David with "Tu te reconnaîtras"
Preceded by Michèle Torr with "Ce soir je t'attendais"	Luxembourg in the Eurovision Song Contest; 1967	Succeeded by Chris Baldo and Sophie Garel with "Nous vivrons d'amour"
Preceded by Monique Melsen with "Pomme, pomme, pomme"	Luxembourg in the Eurovision Song Contest; 1972	Succeeded by Anne-Marie David with "Tu te reconnaîtras"
