= Anne-Marie David =

French singer (born 1952)

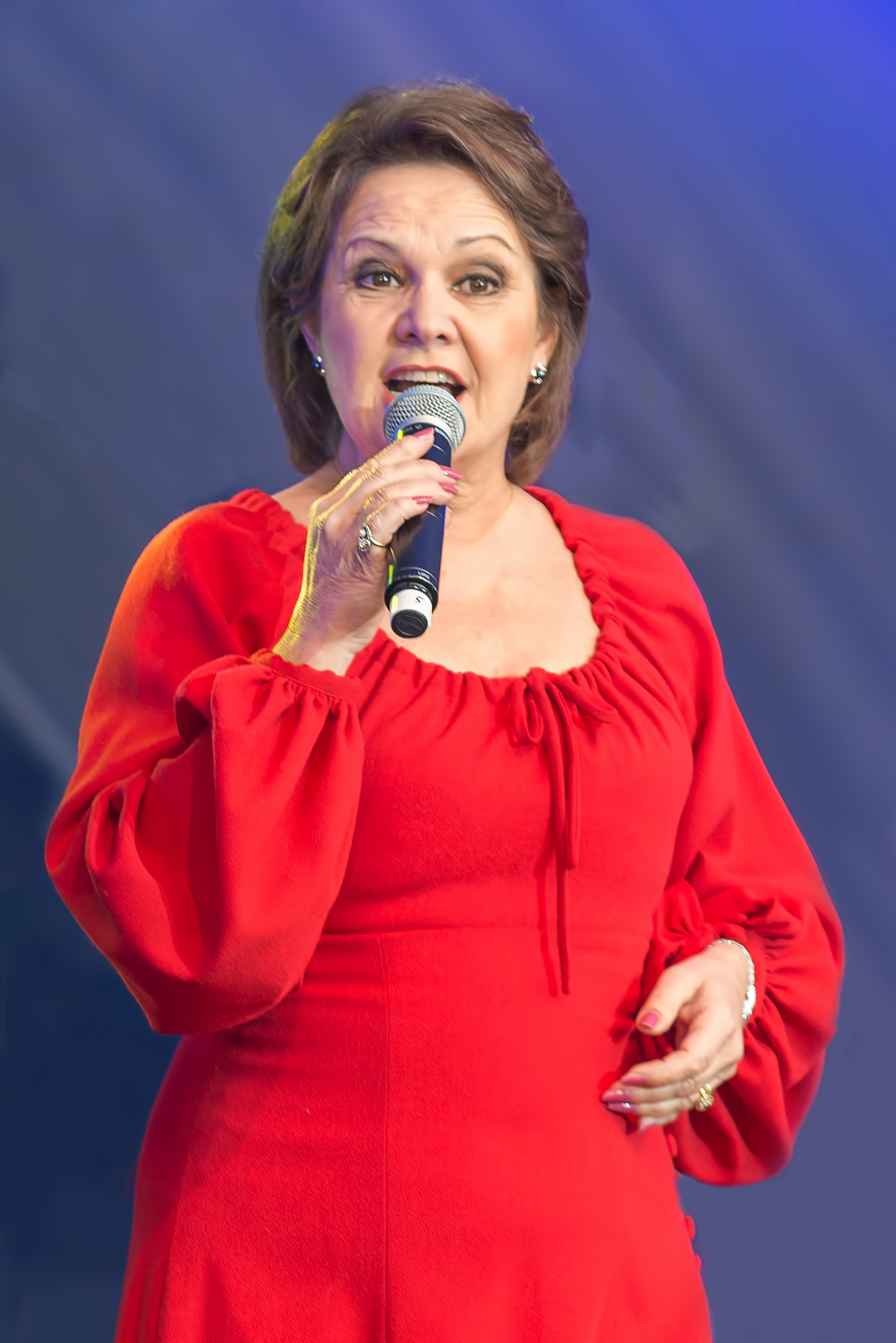
- Anne-Marie David at Stockholm Pride 2015

Background information
- Birth name: Anne Marie David
- Born: 23 May 1952 (age 73); Casablanca, French Protectorate in Morocco
- Origin: Paris, France
- Genres: Pop
- Occupation: Singer
- Years active: 1970–87; 2003–present
- Labels: Energise Records

Anne-Marie David (born 23 May 1952) is a French singer. She has represented both Luxembourg and France at the Eurovision Song Contest, winning in 1973 and placing third in 1979.

== Career ==
David was born and raised in Casablanca, French Protectorate in Morocco, and in Strasbourg. During middle school, she moved with her family to Arles. She started her musical career at age 18 in Paris when she became involved with musical theatre. In 1972, she was cast in the role of Mary Magdalene in the French production of Jesus Christ Superstar. 1972 also saw her submit the song "Un peu romantique" to the French selection committee for the Eurovision Song Contest. It made the final shortlist of ten songs.

In 1973, she was selected to represent Luxembourg as the Grand Duchy sought to repeat its previous year's triumph on home soil in the Eurovision Song Contest. She thus joined the long list of non-native performers to have represented the country in the contest, which also includes France Gall (the 1965 winner) and Vicky Leandros (the 1972 winner). The 1973 contest crystallised into a three-way battle between songs that have since established themselves as Eurovision classics: David's "Tu te reconnaîtras", the Spanish entry "Eres tú", and the United Kingdom's "Power to All Our Friends", performed by Cliff Richard. Ultimately six points separated the third place from David, securing the second successive triumph for Luxembourg.

After the contest, she started touring the world. She lived in Turkey for a while, recorded two singles in Turkish and one album and received several awards in the country. She returned to Eurovision in the 1979 contest held in Jerusalem, this time representing her native France with the song "Je suis l'enfant soleil". Once again it was a tight three-way finish (Israel- Spain- France), with the Israeli entry "Hallelujah" edging to a home victory leaving David in third place. She started to tour France in the 1980s.

Between 1982 and 1983, she continued her musical career in Norway. In 1987, she retired from music but returned in 2003. In 2005, she sang at the festival for the 50th anniversary of the Eurovision Song Contest, staged in Copenhagen, where she performed the 1972 Eurovision winner "Après toi". She attended the live music show of Turkish Radio Television (TRT) before the 2009 Eurovision Final was aired live, with Johnny Logan (1980, 1987 ESC winner). According to ESCRadio.com, in 2011, David released a new revamped version of her 1973 winning song, aptly named "Tu Te Reconnaîtras (Encore Une Fois)". Together with the German pop artist Mave O'Rick she released her comeback single "International" in late 2015, being recommended by Song Contest Consulting as a nomination for Austria, (Germany) and San Marino for the Eurovision Song Contest 2016.

In 2017, after a chance meeting in Austria, Anne Marie David visited Bury St Edmunds in Suffolk and through eXplore Bury St Edmunds founder James Sheen, discovered the story of the first patron saint of the English, King Edmund. She became very interested in the story of King Edmund, she began work, alongside the composer Jean Musy, to create an Oratorio musical based on the legend of this King who became a Saint. The Oratorio was initially performed in Boulogne-sur-mer and then again in Amboise, France. After delays through the lockdown years of covid, work resumed and took on a greater pace in 2023, planning the full English version, to be performed in the hometown of the Saint, for November 2024 at St Mary's Church.

Awards and achievements
Preceded by (Luxembourg) Vicky Leandros with "Après toi"	Winner of the Eurovision Song Contest; 1973	Succeeded by (Sweden) ABBA with "Waterloo"
Preceded by Vicky Leandros with "Après toi"	Luxembourg in the Eurovision Song Contest; 1973	Succeeded by Ireen Sheer with "Bye Bye I Love You"
Preceded by Joël Prévost with "Il y aura toujours des violons"	France in the Eurovision Song Contest; 1979	Succeeded by Profil with "Hé, hé M'sieurs dames"
