= Fighter (Tali song) =

2024 song by Tali

Single by Tali

from the EP Wander
- Released: 12 January 2024
- Genre: Pop
- Length: 2:55; 3:00 (Eurovision version)
- Label: Bel Air
- Songwriters: Ana Zimmer; Dario Faini; Manon Romiti; Silvio Lisbonne
- Producer: Dardust

Tali singles chronology
"Dancing Alone" (2023)	"Fighter" (2024)	"Dear Parents" (2025)

Music video
- "Fighter" on YouTube

Alternate music video
- "Fighter" on YouTube

Alternative cover
- Eurovision version cover

Eurovision Song Contest 2024 entry
- Country: Luxembourg
- Artist: Tali
- Languages: French, English
- Composers: Ana Zimmer; Dario Faini; Manon Romiti
- Lyricists: Ana Zimmer; Manon Romiti; Silvio Lisbonne

Finals performance
- Semi-final result: 5th
- Semi-final points: 117
- Final result: 13th
- Final points: 103

Entry chronology
- ◄ "Donne-moi une chance" (1993)
- "La poupée monte le son" (2025) ►

Official performance video
- "Fighter" (First Semi-Final) on YouTube "Fighter" (Grand Final) on YouTube

"Fighter" is a song by Israeli-born Luxembourgish singer and songwriter Tali Golergant, written by Ana Zimmer, Dario Faini, Manon Romiti, and Silvio Lisbonne. It was released on 12 January 2024 by Bel Air Records. Self-described as a song about how humans suffer and persevere through struggles, the song represented Luxembourg in the Eurovision Song Contest 2024 – the first Luxembourgish entry in the contest in over 30 years, with the country last competing in 1993. At the contest, it finished in 13th place at the final with 103 points.

== Background and composition ==
"Fighter" is composed by Ana Zimmer, Dario Faini, and Manon Romiti, with lyrics for the song written by Zimmer, Romiti, and Silvio Lisbonne. In interviews, Golergant has stated that the song is about how all humans suffer, and how people persevere through suffering, with Golergant in particular using her example of living in New York City and "going through so much rejection" within the music industry.

According to Golergant, in the summer of 2023, she was notified of the national final and was convinced to compete after personal friends sent her information about the contest. Golergant was officially announced to compete in the Luxembourg Song Contest on 11 December, with the song premiering on 9 January 2024. Two months later, after Golergant's victory in the contest, she revealed that the song would undergo a revamp ahead of the Eurovision Song Contest 2024, with the new version being recorded in Paris. The revamped version of "Fighter" released on 29 March.

== Music video and promotion ==
Along with the release of the Eurovision version of "Fighter", an accompanying music video was released on the same day. To further promote the song, Golergant announced her intent to participate in various Eurovision pre-parties throughout the month of April, including the London Eurovision Party 2024 and Eurovision in Concert 2024. She also released an acoustic recording of "Fighter" on the official Eurovision Song Contest YouTube channel on 24 April.

== Critical reception ==
"Fighter" has drawn mixed receptions since its release. In a Wiwibloggs review containing several reviews from several critics, the song was rated 6.4 out of 10 points, earning 22nd out of the 37 songs competing in the Eurovision Song Contest 2024 on the site's annual ranking. Another review conducted by ESC Bubble that contained reviews from a combination of readers and juries rated the song 13th out of the 15 songs competing in the Eurovision semi-final "Fighter" was in. Jon O'Brien, a writer for Vulture, ranked the song 18th overall, stating that while he thought the song would struggle in its hopes of qualifying to the Eurovision grand final, it had a "formulaic, if supremely catchy, ditty". Scotsman writer Erin Adam also gave the song a favourable review, stating that while she thought the song was "dated", she also praised Golergant's vocal abilities, proceeding to rate the song seven out of 10 points. ESC Beat's Doron Lahav ranked the song 13th overall, deeming the song "radio-friendly that doesn’t fall into the world of generic songs".

== Eurovision Song Contest ==
=== Luxembourg Song Contest ===
On 12 May 2023, Luxembourgish broadcaster RTL officially announced that they would compete in the Eurovision Song Contest 2024, marking the first bid for the country to enter the contest in 32 years, and 31 years since Luxembourg last competed. RTL organized an eight-entry final, the Luxembourg Song Contest, to select its entrant for 2024. The edition was the first iteration of the contest. The final was held on 27 January 2024, with the final being separated into two rounds, with both rounds utilizing a 50/50 vote of juries and televoting. The top three in the final would move onto a superfinal.

Golergant was officially announced to compete on 11 December, with the song being released on 9 January. The song was drawn to perform last out of the eight entries. The performance featured Golergant in a black leather dress, surrounded by backing dancers. After moving onto the superfinal, the song earned 94 points from the jury and 84 points from televoting for a combined total of 178 points in the superfinal, winning over second-place finisher, "Drowning In The Rain" by Krick, by 13 points. As a result of the victory, Golergant won the right to represent Luxembourg in the Eurovision Song Contest 2024.

=== At Eurovision ===
The Eurovision Song Contest 2024 took place at the Malmö Arena in Malmö, Sweden, and consisted of two semi-finals held on the respective dates of 7 and 9 May and the final on 11 May 2024. During the allocation draw on 30 January 2024, Luxembourg was drawn to compete in the first semi-final, performing in the second half of the show. Golergant was later drawn to perform 15th and last in the semi-final, following Portugal's Iolanda.

For her Eurovision performance, Ukrainian director German Nenov was appointed as the staging director. The performance featured Golergant in a multi-colored dress along with five backing dancers in purple, red, and pink lighting. The use of fireworks, fire, and smoke were all used. LEDs were also implemented during the performance; a tiger colored in gold along with "colorful swirls" were shown. "Fighter" finished in fifth, scoring 117 points and securing a position in the Eurovision grand final.

Golergant performed a repeat of her performance in the grand final on 11 May. The song was performed fourth in the final, after Germany's Isaak and before Israel's Eden Golan. After the results were announced, she finished in 13th with 103 points, with a split score of 83 points from juries and 20 points from televoting. One set each of the maximum 12 points for both juries and televoting was given by Israel.

== Charts ==
Chart performance for "Fighter"
Chart (2024)	Peak position
Greece International (IFPI)	39
Lithuania (AGATA)	27
Luxembourg (Billboard)	4
Sweden Heatseeker (Sverigetopplistan)	8

== Release history ==
Release history and formats for "Fighter"
Country	Date	Format(s)	Label	Ref.
Various	12 January 2024	Digital download	Bel Air	
Various	29 March 2024	Digital download (Eurovision)	Bel Air	
Various	5 July 2024	Digital download (live version)	Bel Air	
