= Mother Nature (Eva Marija song) =

2026 single by Eva Marija

Single by Eva Marija
- Language: English
- Released: 12 December 2025
- Length: 2:59
- Songwriters: Eva Marija Kavaš Puc; Julie Aagaard; Maria Broberg; Thomas Stengaard

Eva Marija singles chronology
"Sweet Child" (2025)	"Mother Nature" (2025)	"Little Star" (2026)

Eurovision Song Contest 2026 entry
- Country: Luxembourg
- Artist: Eva Marija
- Languages: English
- Composers: Eva Marija Kavaš Puc; Julie Aagaard; Maria Broberg; Thomas Stengaard
- Lyricists: Eva Marija Kavaš Puc; Julie Aagaard; Maria Broberg; Thomas Stengaard

Finals performance
- Semi-final result: 12th
- Semi-final points: 60

Entry chronology
- ◄ "La poupée monte le son" (2025)

"Mother Nature" is a song by Luxembourgish singer-songwriter and violinist Eva Marija. It represented Luxembourg at the Eurovision Song Contest 2026. It is the first Luxembourgish entry in the contest to be performed entirely in English, and the first of Luxembourg's entries to fail to qualify since their return to the contest in 2024.

== Eurovision Song Contest ==
=== Luxembourg Song Contest 2026 ===
On 30 October 2025, Eva Marija was announced as one of the 8 participants for Luxembourg Song Contest 2026. Her competing entry "Mother Nature" would later be released on 12 December 2025. The contest took place on 14 January 2026, where Marija was announced as one of the three finalists to the Super Final. After the voting segment took place, Marija ended up 1st in both the Jury vote and Public vote leading to her win and earning her the right to represent Luxembourg in the Eurovision Song Contest 2026.

=== At Eurovision ===
The Eurovision Song Contest 2026 took place at Wiener Stadthalle in Vienna, Austria, and consisted of two semi-finals to be held on the respective dates of 12 and 14 May and the final on 16 May 2026. During the allocation draw held on 12 January 2026, Luxembourg was drawn to compete in the first half of the second semi-final on 14 May 2026.

== Controversy ==
"Mother Nature" has drawn controversy as some people have pointed out similarities between it and "Keeping Your Head Up" by Birdy, with RTL consulting with partners about the issue. Jeff Spielmann, the Media Manager for Luxembourg in Eurovision told the newspaper: "It's a fact that the song 'Mother Nature' was written last year by the composers together with the artist during the songwriting camp at the Rockhal, and that Birdy's song in no way served as a template." On 11 February 2026 the song was cleared for Eurovision participation. In a statement to L'Essentiel, Spielmann said: "Preparations for the contest in Austria are continuing as normal. We arrived at the conclusion that no other measures are needed at the moment. The current version will not change much. Therefore, there won't be a new song."

== Charts ==
Chart performance for "Mother Nature"
Chart (2026)	Peak position
Luxembourg (Billboard)	25
