= La poupée monte le son =

2024 song by Laura Thorn

Single by Laura Thorn
- Language: French
- English title: "The doll turns up the sound"
- Released: 20 December 2024
- Genre: Pop; electro dance
- Length: 2:58
- Label: Ily8
- Composers: Julien Salvia; Ludovic-Alexandre Vidal
- Lyricists: Christophe Houssin; Julien Salvia; Ludovic-Alexandre Vidal
- Producers: Julien Salvia; Ludovic-Alexandre Vidal

Laura Thorn singles chronology
"La poupée monte le son" (2024)	"Not On Me" (2026)

Alternative covers
- Luxembourg Song Contest Edit cover

Eurovision Song Contest 2025 entry
- Country: Luxembourg
- Artist: Laura Thorn
- Language: French
- Composers: Julien Salvia; Ludovic-Alexandre Vidal
- Lyricists: Christophe Houssin; Julien Salvia; Ludovic-Alexandre Vidal

Finals performance
- Semi-final result: 7th
- Semi-final points: 62
- Final result: 22nd
- Final points: 47

Entry chronology
- ◄ "Fighter" (2024)
- "Mother Nature" (2026) ►

"La poupée monte le son" (French: [la pupe mɔ̃t lə sɔ̃]; lit. 'The doll turns up the sound') is the debut single by Luxembourgish singer Laura Thorn. A nod to Luxembourg’s winning Eurovision entry in 1965, the song was released on 20 December 2024, and was written by Christophe Houssin, Julien Salvia, and Ludovic-Alexandre Vidal. A revamped version of the song was released on 18 March 2025. The song represented Luxembourg in the Eurovision Song Contest 2025.

== Background and composition ==
"La poupée monte le son" was written and composed by French songwriters Christophe Houssin, Julien Salvia, and Ludovic-Alexandre Vidal. The song was described as a homage to France Gall's song "Poupée de cire, poupée de son", Luxembourg’s winning Eurovision entry in 1965. During the press conference after winning Luxembourg Song Contest 2025, Laura Thorn said that "a doll is controlled by someone. The one I sing about no longer lets itself be done", referring to an opposite approach to Gall's song. In an interview with ESCBubble, Thorn further said, "I love the fact that there's this connection with France's song, especially because it won Eurovision exactly 60 years ago, so I thought that's such a great idea to really honour Luxembourg and its history with the Eurovision Song Contest".

A revamped version of the song was released to streaming platforms on 18 March 2025.

== Promotion ==
To promote "La poupée monte le son" before the Eurovision Song Contest 2025, Thorn announced her intent to participate in various Eurovision pre-parties. It was first announced that she will be performing at Eurovision in Concert 2025 held at AFAS Live Arena in Amsterdam on 5 April 2025. She also participated at PrePartyES 2025 on 19 April 2025 held in Madrid.

== Critical reception ==
Jon O’Brien from Vulture ranked the song 11th, calling the song "this year’s most charming entry". Angelica Frey from The Guardian dubbed the song as one of the 10 best Eurovision songs of 2025, describing it as a "melody that combines strings, a four-on-the-floor beat and a vaguely eerie music-box melody". Further, The Telegraph's Ed Power listed the song among the 10 Eurovision finalists to watch, describing it as a "creepy banger seemingly about a doll that wants to be pop." Rob Picheta from CNN ranked the entry seventh out of the 26 finalists, calling the song a "bouncy, fun and severely underrated twist on classic".

On the other hand, Eva Frantz from Yle gave the song a 3/10, noting that while the track is "all cute and charming", the entire song feels "a bit childish". In a review for The Times, Ed Potton gave the song three out of five stars, describing it as featuring a "na-na-na" chorus, Abba-inspired chord progressions, and a mid-performance costume change. He suggested that the song "could have emerged from a Eurovision song generator".

== Eurovision Song Contest 2025 ==
=== Luxembourg Song Contest 2025 ===
The Luxembourg Song Contest 2025 was organised by RTL Lëtzebuerg to select its entry for that year's Eurovision Song Contest. Seven entries competed in a televised final held on 25 January 2025, where the winner was selected through a singular round of voting, made up of an equal combination of votes from eight international jury groups, and a public international vote on RTL's website.

Thorn was officially announced to compete in the Luxembourg Song Contest 2025 on 19 December 2024, and the competing entry was officially released the following day. The song performed sixth in the running order, and scored 94 points from the jury and 90 points from televoting for a combined total of 184 points, ultimately winning the contest and the Luxembourgish spot for the 2025 Eurovision Song Contest.

=== At Eurovision ===
The Eurovision Song Contest 2025 took place at St. Jakobshalle in Basel, Switzerland, and consisted of two semi-finals held on the respective dates of 13 and 15 May and the final on 17 May 2025. During the allocation draw held on 28 January 2025, Luxembourg was drawn to compete in the second semi-final, performing in the second half of the show. Thorn was later drawn to perform 13th, after Czechia's Adonxs and before Israel's Yuval Raphael. The song qualified for the grand final, placing 7th.

Thorn performed a repeat of her performance in the grand final on 17 May. The song was performed second, following Norway's Kyle Alessandro and before Estonia's Tommy Cash. It placed 22nd, with 47 points.

== Track listing ==
Digital download/streaming – Luxembourg Song Contest edit

1. "La poupée monte le son" (LSC Edit) – 2:58

Digital download/streaming – Eurovision version

1. "La poupée monte le son" – 2:58
2. "La poupée monte le son" (instrumental) – 2:58

Digital download/streaming – Poupée électrique version

1. "La poupée monte le son" (feat. Namski) [Poupée Électrique] – 3:26

Digital download/streaming – Jay&Jay remix

1. "La poupée monte le son" (Jay&Jay remix) – 3:26
2. "La poupée monte le son" (Jay&Jay extended remix) – 4:22

== Charts ==
Chart performance for "La poupée monte le son"
Chart (2025)	Peak position
Finland (Suomen virallinen lista)	46
Greece International (IFPI)	73
Lithuania (AGATA)	45
Luxembourg (Billboard)	6
Netherlands (Single Tip)	25
Sweden Heatseeker (Sverigetopplistan)	10
Switzerland (Schweizer Hitparade)	35
UK Singles Downloads (Official Charts)	40
UK Singles Sales (OCC)	41

== Release history ==
Release dates and formats for "La poupée monte le son"
Region	Date	Format(s)	Version	Label	Ref.
Various	20 December 2024	Digital download; streaming	Luxembourg Song Contest edit	Ily8	
Various	18 March 2025	Digital download; streaming	Eurovision version	Ily8	
Various	30 May 2025	Digital download; streaming	Poupée électrique	Self-released	
Various	8 August 2025	Digital download; streaming	Jay&Jay remix	Self-released	
