= J'aime la vie =

1986 song by Sandra Kim

Single by Sandra Kim

from the album J'aime la vie
- Language: French
- English title: "Crazy of Life" (first version) "J'aime la vie" (second version)
- B-side: "On n'oublie pas"
- Released: 1986
- Genre: Bubblegum pop
- Length: 3:00
- Label: Carrere
- Composers: Jean Paul Furnémont; Angelo Crisci
- Lyricist: Marino Atria
- Producer: Marino Atria

Sandra Kim singles chronology
"Ami Ami" (1985)	"J'aime la vie" (1986)	"Tokyo Boy" (1986)

Eurovision Song Contest 1986 entry
- Country: Belgium
- Artist: Sandra Caldarone
- As: Sandra Kim
- Language: French
- Composers: Jean Paul Furnémont; Angelo Crisci
- Lyricist: Marino Atria
- Conductor: Jo Carlier

Finals performance
- Final result: 1st
- Final points: 176

Entry chronology
- ◄ "Laat me nu gaan" (1985)
- "Soldiers of Love" (1987) ►

Official performance video
- "J'aime la vie" on YouTube

"J'aime la vie" (French pronunciation: [ʒɛm(ə) la vi]; "I Love Life") is a song recorded by Belgian singer Sandra Kim, with music composed by Jean Paul Furnémont and Angelo Crisci, and lyrics by Marino Atria. It represented Belgium in the Eurovision Song Contest 1986, held in Bergen, winning the contest. It is the only song from Belgium to win the contest, and Kim is the youngest ever Eurovision winner.

The song was included on Kim's album J'aime la vie in 1986. As a single, it topped Belgium's singles chart for seven weeks and was the country's best-selling hit of 1986, and it also reached the top 20 in Austria, the Netherlands, Portugal, and Sweden.

== Background ==
=== Conception ===
"J'aime la vie" was written by composers Jean Paul Furnémont and Angelo Crisci, with lyrics by Marino Atria, and was recorded by Sandra Kim. Performed in French, the song is a positive one, dealing with the pleasure to be had in life.

Kim, herself of Italian descent, also recorded it in Italian –with the same title as the original French, "J'aime la vie"–, and English –in two versions, the first "Crazy of Life", the second with the same title as the original French, "J'aime la vie"–.

=== Selection ===
On 2 March 1986, "J'aime la vie" performed by Kim competed in the national final organized by the Radio-télévision belge de la Communauté française (RTBF) to select their song and performer for the 31st edition of the Eurovision Song Contest. The song won the competition so it became the Belgian entry for the contest.

=== Music video ===
A music video of the song was released where Kim sang the song with the common theme of "things she likes" intact throughout. In the video, she does many things which she finds enjoyable, which include partaking in physical education class, hanging out with friends, listening to her Walkman, buying a big ice cream cone, and performing a choreographed dance in an exercise studio.

The video was reconstructed scene by scene some 25 years later as a commercial for the insurance company Delta Lloyd. The new and old videos were then shown side by side.

=== Eurovision ===
On 3 May 1986, the Eurovision Song Contest was held at the Grieghallen in Bergen, Norway, hosted by Norsk rikskringkasting (NRK), and broadcast live throughout the continent. Kim performed "J'aime la vie" thirteenth on the night, following Ireland's "You Can Count on Me" by Luv Bug and preceding Germany's "Über Die Brücke Geh'n" by Ingrid Peters. Jo Carlier conducted the live orchestra in the performance of the Belgian entry.

At the close of voting, the song had received 176 points, finishing first in a field of twenty. The entry received points from every jury. Although the lyrics describe the singer as being "fifteen", Kim was later proven to be only thirteen at the time of her performance. She thus remains the youngest ever Eurovision winner and one of the youngest-ever performers at the contest. Her record is unlikely to be challenged, as the Contest rules were changed to specify that performers must turn at least sixteen in the year that they perform. It was reported that the Swiss delegation, who had placed 2nd, petitioned to have the Belgian win nullified after Kim's age was revealed.

"J'aime la vie" was succeeded as Belgian representative at the 1987 contest by "Soldiers of Love" by Liliane Saint-Pierre.

=== Aftermath ===
In a 2006 interview, Kim was asked if she sings "J'aime la vie" "with pleasure" at concerts and events now, to which she responded, "Not always." She then said, "It's a little girl's song, with little girl's lyrics, with a young adolescent's atmosphere. Nowadays, singing 'J'aime la vie'... do you like life every day? Me neither."

On 22 May 2021, the interval act "Rock the Roof" in the Eurovision Song Contest 2021 grand final featured "J'aime la vie" performed by Sandra Kim.

== Track listing ==
7-inch single

1. "J'aime la vie" – 3:00
2. "Ne m'oublie pas" – 4:39

== Personnel ==
"J'aime la vie"

- Written by R. Marino-Atria/J.F. Furnemont-A. Crisci
- Arranged by J.P. Lebens
- Produced by Marino

"On n'oublie pas"

- Written by R. Marino-Atria/J.F. Furnemont-A. Crisci-A. Bertrand
- Engineered L. Tylgat

== Charts ==
=== Weekly charts ===
Chart (1986)	Peak position
Austria (Ö3 Austria Top 40)	6
Belgium (Ultratop 50 Flanders)	1
Europe (Eurochart Hot 100)	16
France (SNEP)	21
Netherlands (Dutch Top 40)	4
Netherlands (Single Top 100)	2
Portugal (AFP)	3
Sweden (Sverigetopplistan)	15
Switzerland (Schweizer Hitparade)	29
UK Singles (OCC)	111
West Germany (GfK)	50

=== Year-end charts ===
Chart (1986)	Position
Belgium (Ultratop)	1
Europe (European Hot 100)	94
Netherlands (Dutch Top 40)	51
Netherlands (Single Top 100)	55

== Certifications ==
Region	Certification	Certified units/sales
Belgium (BRMA)	2× Platinum	300,000

== Legacy ==
"J'aime la vie" was covered by Pommelien Thijs as the character in Caroline Timmers in the Flemish TV series #LikeMe.

Preceded by "La det swinge" by Bobbysocks!	Eurovision Song Contest winners 1986	Succeeded by "Hold Me Now" by Johnny Logan
