= Avi Kushnir =

Israeli comedian, actor and host

- אבי קושניר
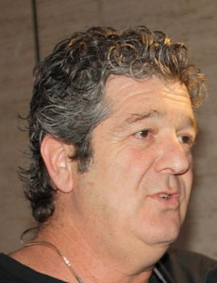
- Born: 26 August 1960 (age 65); Tel Aviv, Israel
- Occupations: Israeli film, television, and theatre actor, comedian, singer, television host, and stand‑up performer.

Abraham Yeshayahu Kushnir (Hebrew: אַבְרָהָם יְשַׁעְיָהוּ קוּשְׁנִיר; born 26 August 1960). He is an Israeli film, television, and theatre actor, comedian, singer, television host, and stand‑up performer. He is a recipient of the Israeli Television Academy Award and participated in the Eurovision Song Contest in 1987.

== Early life ==
During high school Kushnir studied at the youth village HaKfar HaYarok. Afterwards, during his mandatory military service, Kushnir served in an Infantry unit. After his army service Kushnir worked as a stagehand and later on began directing plays.

== Career ==
His professional career as an actor began in the early 1980s when he began performing in stand-up shows. In 1985 Kushnir hosted the Festigal, an annual Israeli singing show alongside Gadi Yagil.

=== Eurovision Song Contest ===
In 1987, while he was 27 years old, Kushnir represented Israel in the 1987 Eurovision Song Contest alongside Natan Datner, as part of the comedic duo HaBatlanim (lit. The Bums), with the comical song Shir Habatlanim which finished in eighth place.

== Filmography ==
=== Film and television ===
Year	Show/Film	Role	Notes
1983	"Parpar Nehmad"	Guest role	Children's show
1983	"HaChatul Shmil"	Guest role	Children's show
1985	Banot	Rami	film by Nadav Levitan
1986	"Alex Holeh Ahavah"	Motke	Boaz Davidson's cult film
1986	"Battle of the Committee" ("הקרב על הוועד")		HaGashash HaHiver's trilogy series
1986	"Plumber" ("האינסטלטור")		Mickey Bahagan's film
1986	"The Great Obsession" ("השיגעון הגדול")		Naftali Alter's film
1989	"Avoda BaEinayim" ("עבודה בעיניים").		Yigal Shilon's hidden camera film also starring Nathan Dattner
1988-1998, 2020	"Zehu Ze!"	variety of characters	Israeli skit show
1990	"Tzipi Bli Hafsaka" (ציפי בלי הפסקה)	Avi	children's TV series
1999	"Kushnir's show"	himself	TV series directed by Adi Binyaminov.
2001-2011	"Ha-Chaim Ze Lo Hacol"	Gadi Neumann	Israeli sitcom
2002-2003	"Madrich Kushnir" (מדריך קושניר, lit. "Kushnir's Guide").	host	travel show on Channel 2
2004	"Metallic Blues".		also starring Moshe Ivgy
2004	"Ratzim LaDira" (רצים לדירה)	host	Israeli reality show
2004	"Bemdinat HaYehudim"		documentary TV show on history of Jewish humor
2005-2011	Israeli edition of "Dancing with the Stars"	host	
2006	"Love & Dance" (סיפור חצי רוסי).	Rami	Eitan Anar's film
2007	"The Israelis" (הישראלים)		Israeli skit show
2006	"Grease"	host	reality TV show
2013-2014	"Raid the Cage"	host	game show
2015	"Zirelson goes to Pension"	Adult Zirelson	Filmed in 2011
2016	"Ewa"	Yoel	

=== Theater ===
Year	Play	Role	Notes
	All My Sons but Naomi		Beit Lessin Theatre
	Black Comedy		Beit Lessin Theatre
	A Guest Has Arrived		Beit Lessin Theatre
	The Twins of Venice		Beit Lessin Theatre ("להציל את איש המערות")
	Defending the Caveman		Beit Lessin Theatre
	The Frivolity and Hypocrisy		Beer Sheva Theatre
	The Taming of the Shrew		Beer Sheva Theatre
	Yitush BaRosh		Beer Sheva Theatre
	Gorodish		Cameri Theatre Kushnir
2001	A Funny Thing Happened		Cameri Theatre Kushnir
	The Fantastic Francis		Haifa Theater Kushnir
2005	The King and the Cobbler		Habima theater
	Mechabeset Tola ("מכבס תולה")		Original show created by Kushnir
	HaMoch HaGavri("המוח הגברי")		Original show created by Kushnir

== Personal life ==
Kushnir was married to Fabian Lover. Kushnir is now married to Carmel and is the father of three children. He lives with his family in Tel Aviv.

His eldest son, Yotam Kushnir, is an actor and director who has appeared in several television productions, including the youth series "HaAlifim." His second son, Yiftach Kushnir, is a professional rock climber and competed in the first two seasons of the Israeli television show "Ninja Israel," finishing in third place in the first season. His daughter, Noa Kushnir, has made guest appearances in the television sitcom "HaChaim Ze Lo HaKol"

Awards and achievements
Preceded by Moti Giladi & Sarai Tzuriel with Yavo Yom	Israel in the Eurovision Song Contest (with Natan Datner); 1987	Succeeded by Yardena Arazi with Ben Adam
