= Ami Ami =

1985 single by Sandra Kim

Single by Sandra Kim
- A-side: "'Ami Ami'"
- B-side: "Apetta Mi"
- Released: 1985
- Genre: Pop
- Length: 3'16
- Label: Carrere
- Producer: Marino Atria

Sandra Kim singles chronology
"Ami Ami" (1985)	"J'aime la vie" (1986)

"Ami Ami" is the 1985 debut single of Belgian singer Sandra Kim.

In 1985, as a member of Musiclub, Kim competed at the "L'ambrogino d'oro" festival in Milan with "Ami Ami" and placing fourth. The song peaked at #14 on the Belgian charts.

== Music video ==
In the music video Kim is singing and dancing in front of an artificial blue, orange and red background.

== Versions ==
In the vinyl characteristics, it has the same song but in two languages, Italian and French (original version).
