= Cal Dodd =

Irish voice actor

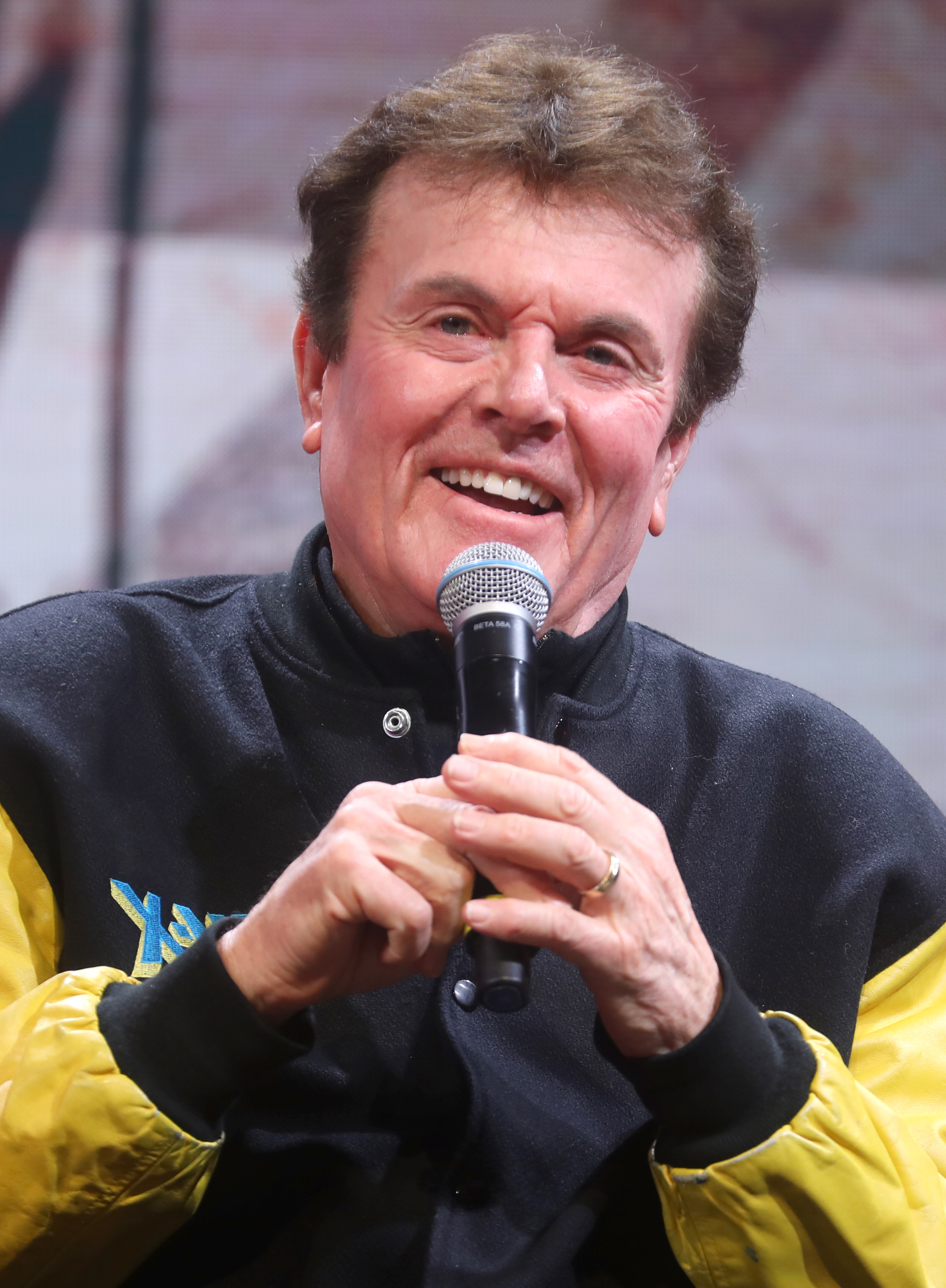
- Dodd in 2024
- Born: Cathal J. Dodd; Dublin, Ireland
- Occupation: Voice actor
- Years active: 1977–present
- Known for: Wolverine in X-Men: The Animated Series

Cathal J. Dodd is an Irish-born voice actor based in Canada. He is best known for his portrayal of the Marvel Comics character Wolverine in X-Men: The Animated Series, its revival X-Men '97, and the early entries of the Marvel vs. Capcom series of video games.

== Early life ==
Dodd's family moved from Ireland to Port Dover, Ontario. His mother was a music teacher at Port Dover Public School. He performed in a band in the 1970s called Deja Vu. He is also the older brother of rock vocalist Rory Dodd. He also has four other siblings.

== Career ==
Dodd voiced the Random Virus in the BBC series Ace Lightning. He recorded with producer Bob Hahn in Canada, which consisted of demos and material to be submitted to major labels. His recordings ended up on the RCA label, with a full-length album release New Horizons on Hahn's own Rising Records label in 1975. He co-hosted the Canadian series Circus on CTV with Sherisse Laurence from 1978 to 1983.

== Discography ==
- (1975) Cal Dodd – New Horizons
- (1976) Various Artists – Rockabye Hamlet
- (1976) Déjà Vu – Songs For Everyone
- (1977) Déjà Vu – Get It Up For Love
- (2007) Cal Dodd – Cal Dodd
- (2011) Tom Szczesniak – Waltz For Bill

== Filmography ==
=== Film ===
Year	Title	Role	Notes
2003	Rescue Heroes: The Movie	Rip Rockefeller (voice)	
2008	Gotta Catch Santa Claus	LeFreeze (voice)	
2019	PAW Patrol: Ready Race Rescue	Ron Rapidfire (voice)	

=== Television ===
Year	Title	Role	Notes
1978–1983	Circus	Host	
1984	Fraggle Rock	Singing Doozer (voice)	Episode: "Doozer Is as Doozer Does"
1992–1997	X-Men: The Animated Series	Logan / Wolverine (voice)	73 episodes
1995	Spider-Man: The Animated Series	Logan / Wolverine (voice)	2 episodes
1997	Goosebumps	Slappy the Dummy (voice)	Episodes: "Night of the Living Dummy III"
1999	Mythic Warriors: Guardians of the Legend	Lucius / Palace Guard (voices)	Episode: "Ulysses & Penelope"
2001	Diabolik	Stone (voice)	
2001–2003	Rescue Heroes	Rip Rockefeller (voice)	6 episodes
2002	Ace Lightning	Random Virus (voice)	
2003	King	Bob Wire (voice)	8 episodes
2003	Moville Mysteries	Maurice / Angelo (voices)	2 episodes
2005	Time Warp Trio	Blackbeard, Toghrul (voice)	Episode: "The Not-So-Jolly Roger"
2006	Weird Years	Donko Dorkovitch (voice)	
2006–2007	Bigfoot Presents: Meteor and the Mighty Monster Trucks	Crushmeister (voice)	2 episodes
2007	Storm Hawks	Ninier (voice)	Episode: "Velocity"
2010	The Adventures of Chuck and Friends	Mixer Mike, additional voices	14 episodes
2014	The Ron James Show	Singer	5 episodes
2020	Ollie's Pack	Sheriff Grigglemore	1 episode
2023	Scott Pilgrim Takes Off	Threatening Paparazzi Guy (voice)	Episode: "Whatever"
2024–present	X-Men '97	Logan / Wolverine (voice)	15 episodes

=== Video games ===
Year	Title	Voice role	Notes
1994	X-Men: Children of the Atom	Wolverine, Iceman	
1995	Highlander: The Last of the MacLeods	Mangus' Aid	
1995	Marvel Super Heroes	Wolverine, Captain America	
1996	X-Men vs. Street Fighter	Wolverine	
1996	X-Men Cartoon Maker	Wolverine	
1997	Marvel Super Heroes vs. Street Fighter	Wolverine, Captain America	
1998	Marvel vs. Capcom: Clash of Super Heroes	Wolverine, Captain America, Iceman	
2000	Marvel vs. Capcom 2: New Age of Heroes	Wolverine, Captain America, Iceman	
2025	Marvel Cosmic Invasion	Wolverine	
