= Tony Ray =

Jamaican-Israeli musician (born 1949)

Tony Ray טוני ריי
- Born: Raymond Anthony Forbes; 19 April 1949 (age 76)
- Origin: Kingston, Jamaica
- Genres: Reggae, soul, ska, dancehall
- Occupation: Musician
- Instruments: Vocals, bass, drums
- Years active: 1968–present
- Labels: NMC Music, Japka Production

Raymond Anthony Forbes (Hebrew: טוני ריי; born 19 April 1949, in Kingston, Jamaica), known professionally as Tony Ray, is a Jamaican-Israeli musician. He is most noted as being the pioneer of Reggae in Israel as he released I Feel Like Reggae in 1981 which was the first reggae album in the country.

== Career ==
In 1963 Tony Ray moved with his family to Bristol and there he started to be involved with music. His first band was The Lurks, he played the bass and was the vocalist of the band. Later on he played with The Cocktails and toured in Europe and the Middle East.

In 1970 he relocated to Tel Aviv after a tour in Israel with The Cocktails. In 1981 he released his debut album which had songs both in English and Hebrew, the album received medium success. Since then he has released seven more albums and in 1998 he opened the Rasta Club in Tel Aviv, which is one of the only clubs in Israel dedicated for reggae music.

In 1986 Ray and his band had a brief appearance in the film Alex Holeh Ahavah. He also was a musical guest on the sketch comedy TV series Zehu Ze!. Tony had a small role in the second-season finale of Shemesh.

== Discography ==
- 1981 I Feel Like Reggae
- 1985 Burn de Wicked Man
- 1987 Reggae Man
- 1990 Do De Reggae
- 1995 Drive Me Crazy
- 2007 The Voice of Jamaica
- 2013 Children of the World
- 2015 No More Wars
