= Celebrity Big Brother 3 =

Celebrity Big Brother 3 may refer to:

- Celebrity Big Brother 3 (British TV series) series 3, the 2005 British series of Celebrity Big Brother
- Celebrity Big Brother 3 (American season), the 2022 American season of Celebrity Big Brother
- Big Brother VIP 3 (Portugal), the 2013 rebooted third season of the Portuguese version of Celebrity Big Brother
- Big Brother VIP 3, the 2003 season of Big Brother VIP in Hungary
- Big Brother VIP 3, the 2004 season of Big Brother VIP in Mexico
- Bigg Boss (India):
  - Bigg Boss (Hindi TV series) season 3, the 2009 Hindi season of Bigg Boss, the Indian version of Big Brother
  - Bigg Boss Kannada 3, the 2015–2016 Kannada season of Bigg Boss, the Indian version of Big Brother
- Gran Hermano VIP 3, the 2015 VIP season of Gran Hermano, the version of Big Brother in Spain
- Grande Fratello VIP 3, the 2018 VIP season of Grande Fratello, the version of Big Brother in Italy
- HaAh HaGadol VIP 3, the 2019 VIP edition of HaAh HaGadol, the Israeli version of Big Brother
- Promi Big Brother 3, the 2015 season of Promi Big Brother, the celebrity version of Big Brother in Germany
- Veliki Brat VIP All Stars, the 2009 celebrity season of Veliki brat, the version of Big Brother in Serbia, Bosnia and Herzegovina, Montenegro
- VIP Brother 3, the 2009 season of VIP Brother in Bulgaria

== See also ==
- Celebrity Big Brother
- Celebrity Big Brother 2 (disambiguation)
