= Celebrity Big Brother 2 =

Celebrity Big Brother 2 may refer to:

- Celebrity Big Brother 2 (British TV series) series 2, the 2002 British series of Celebrity Big Brother
- Celebrity Big Brother 2 (American season), the 2019 American season of Celebrity Big Brother
- Big Brother Famosos 2, the 2002 season of Big Brother Famosos, the Portuguese version of Celebrity Big Brother
- Big Brother VIP 2, the 2003 season of Big Brother VIP in Hungary
- Big Brother VIP 2, the 2003 season of Big Brother VIP in Mexico
- Big Brother VIPs 2, the 2006 season of Big Brother VIPs in Belgium
- Bigg Boss (India):
  - Bigg Boss (Hindi TV series) season 2, the 2008 Hindi season of Bigg Boss, the Indian version of Big Brother
  - Bigg Boss Kannada 2, the 2014 Kannada season of Bigg Boss, the Indian version of Big Brother
  - Bigg Boss Bangla 2, the 2016 Bengali season of Bigg Boss, the Indian version of Big Brother
  - Bigg Boss Tamil 2, the 2018 Tamil season of Bigg Boss, the Indian version of Big Brother
  - Bigg Boss Telugu 2, the 2018 Telugu season of Bigg Boss, the Indian version of Big Brother
- Gran Hermano VIP 2, the 2005 VIP season of Gran Hermano, the version of Big Brother in Spain
- Grande Fratello VIP 2, the 2017 VIP season of Grande Fratello, the version of Big Brother in Italy
- HaAh HaGadol VIP 2, the 2015 VIP edition of HaAh HaGadol, the Israeli version of Big Brother
- Hotel Big Brother, the 2009 season of Big Brother VIPs in the Netherlands
- Pinoy Big Brother: Celebrity Edition 2, the 2007–2008 celebrity season of Big Brother in the Philippines
- Promi Big Brother 2, the 2014 season of Promi Big Brother, the celebrity version of Big Brother in Germany
- Veliki brat VIP 2, the 2008 celebrity season of Veliki brat, the version of Big Brother in Serbia, Bosnia and Herzegovina, Montenegro
- VIP Brother 2, the 2007 season of VIP Brother in Bulgaria

== See also ==
- Celebrity Big Brother
- Celebrity Big Brother 3 (disambiguation)
