= Big Brother VIP (Israeli TV series) season 2 =

Big Brother VIP
- Season 2
- Presented by: Erez Tal; Assi Azar
- No. of days: 38
- No. of housemates: 12
- Winner: Moshik Afia
- Runner-up: Nir "Niro" Levy
- No. of episodes: 12

Release
- Original network: Channel 2 (Keshet)
- Original release: 10 May – 16 June 2015

Season chronology
- ← Previous; Season 1 Next → Season 3

HaAh HaGadol VIP 2 (Hebrew: האח הגדול VIP 2; lit. The Big Brother VIP 2) started on May 10, 2015. This is the second VIP season of the Israeli version of the Big Brother series, after a first one back in 2009. The show follows the main Big Brother rules, but with some changes. For example, in Big Brother VIP the show's duration is shorter and the housemates were Israeli celebrities.

== Housemates ==
=== Ariana ===
Ariana Melamed is a journalist. She has two children. When she was 8 years old, she was involved in a car crash and stayed in the bed for 3 years. She loves to read. She was kicked out from every place she worked even from IDF. She is the biggest critic of Big Brother but she wants to see how it is from inside. She thinks that this season will be more interesting than the previous one.

=== Israel ===
Israel Goodovitch is an architect. He was "street boy" as a kid but he always pretends to be a nice boy with clean hands. He wanted to work in the theater but his father doesn’t approve it. He is architect of many buildings and stadiums. He hates someone to pull his strings. He doesn’t want to leave the planet without to try everything.

=== Itzik ===
Itzik Zohar is a footballer and sports commenter. He loves football since he is very young. He loves to be a star. He likes the hair style of George Michael. He fixed his first football shoes because they were bigger than his size. On age of 17 he already was top footballer. He got slap in the face when he got trauma on the leg, and he thinks that it happens when a man thinks that he is bigger than life.

=== Katya ===
Katya Gali is a model. She was born in Moscow. In the past her family thinks that to be smart is better than to be beautiful and she left Russia. She starts modeling in London, Paris, etc. She met her husband in England. They moved to Israel. But her husband wasn’t happy. Then he involved her with heroin. She want to leave him but she is afraid to stay alone, so she becomes drug addict. Everything in her family life starts to fall down. She becomes homeless. She is clean from 3 years and continues to fight.

=== Moshik ===
Moshik Afia is a singer. He is divorced and has no children, having been married for two years. He had success with a song and earned a substantial amount of money, which he spent quickly and no longer has. He has stated that he is now a different person and "doesn’t live in a movie" anymore. He dislikes excess hair on his body. He is sensitive, watches telenovelas, and cries easily while watching them.

=== Moti ===
Moti Giladi is an actor and a singer, represented Israel in the Eurovision Song Contest 1986 (Along with Sarai Tzuriel). He found his talent of imitation from young age. His first wife died at 46. He confessed how hard it was then when he knew what will happen in his home and to go on stage and to make the public laugh. After her death he thought that he will never return to the stage but his children gave him strength to do so.

=== Natalie ===
Natalie Attaya is an actress and model. She spent many years in trying to like herself, because in the past she never likes herself. She hates the word "relationship". In marriage she feels that the walls smash her. She prefers piece swimsuit than bikini. She wants to be in Big Brother because she feels that here she will start something new.

=== Niro ===
Nir "Niro" Levy is an actor. He wasn’t the best athlete, the best student or the beauties boy. A girl told him "why you not become an actor". Then another girl in America told him the same and he started to work on it. Then he had a romance with a girl who looks like Nicole Kidman. She was very rich but one day she "kicked" him out. He doesn’t have idea what he will do in the house.

=== Rotem ===
Rotem Aizak is a journalist. She likes Beyonce. In her childhood she never believes that she is beautiful. She likes to write articles about sex. She doesn’t believe in monogamy. She searches for mister big…heart. She is tough girl. Her father asked her "Who will be your boyfriend? Ballerina?"

=== Shir ===
Shir Elmaliach is a model. She is model since she was 17. She wants to have blue eyes. When she was little girl she wanted to be a singer. She is together with her husband since she was in school, and he is the only man in her life. If she is the first evicted, it will be shame for her. She is afraid to not fall from the stairs.

=== Stav ===
Stav Strashko is a trans model. She was born in Ukraine. Her family came to Israel when she was 2 years old. She was quiet kid, she loved to play with dresses but also with robots. When she became a model she said to herself that she could be a beautiful girl. (She identified as male as the time.) She has a boyfriend who accepts her body like it is. The men flirt with her on the street but she hates it when someone opens the door of her car, thinking that she will do something with him. She doesn’t like how she looks in the morning.

=== Stella ===
Stella Amar is a model and writer. In America she is famous with the name Stella Ellis. Jean-Paul Gaultier discovers her in the early 1990s and she becomes his muse. Stella Ellis was featured in Italian Vogue, French Vogue, Elle, Glamour, Oprah's magazine and many others. She has participation in projects of George Michel and Madonna. She writes the book "Size Sexy" for the women which doesn’t know how to accept themselves and wants to show that a woman can be a model even if she is not abnormally thin woman.

== Nominations table ==
	Week 1	Week 2	Week 3	Week 4	Week 5		
	Week 1	Week 2	Week 3	Week 4	Day 36	Final	
Moshik	Niro; Ariana	Katya; Niro	Nominated	Niro; Rotem	No; Nominations	Winner (Day 38)	
Niro	Natalie; Rotem	Itzik; Natalie	Nominated	Itzik; Rotem	No; Nominations	Runner-Up (Day 38)	
Shir	Ariana; Moti	Katya; Moti	Nominated	Stella; Stav	No; Nominations	Third place (Day 38)	
Itzik	Ariana; Niro	Katya; Niro	No; Nominations	Stella; Niro	No; Nominations	Fourth place (Day 38)	
Stella	Not in House	Niro; Rotem	No; Nominations	Rotem; Itzik	No; Nominations	Fifth place (Day 38)	
Stav	Niro; Ariana	Niro; Rotem	No; Nominations	Itzik; Shir	No; Nominations	Evicted (Day 36)	
Moti	Rotem; Ariana	Niro; Rotem	No; Nominations	Rotem; Shir	No; Nominations	Evicted (Day 36)	
Rotem	Ariana; Moti	Moti; Niro	No; Nominations	Stella; Niro	Evicted (Day 31)		
Natalie	Ariana; Niro	Katya; Rotem	Nominated	Evicted (Day 24)			
Katya	Ariana; Shir	Itzik; Natalie	Evicted (Day 17)				
Israel	Itzik; Katya	Walked (Day 10)					
Ariana	Itzik; Rotem	Evicted (Day 10)					
Notes	1, 2	3	4, 5	6	7	8	
Nominated for Eviction	Ariana; Israel; Moti; Niro; Rotem; Shir	Katya; Moti; Natalie; Niro; Rotem; Stav	Moshik; Natalie; Niro; Shir	Itzik; Moshik; Niro; Rotem	Itzik; Moshik; Moti; Niro; Shir; Stav; Stella	Itzik; Moshik; Niro; Shir; Stella	
Walked	Israel	none					
Evicted	Ariana	Katya	Natalie	Rotem	Moti	Stella; Fewest votes to win	Itzik; Fewest votes to win
Evicted	Ariana	Katya	Natalie	Rotem	Moti	Shir; Fewest votes to win	Niro; Fewest votes to win
Evicted	Ariana	Katya	Natalie	Rotem	Stav	Shir; Fewest votes to win	Niro; Fewest votes to win
Evicted	Ariana	Katya	Natalie	Rotem	Stav	Moshik; Most votes to win	

=== Notes ===
- ^Note 1: Shir entered first in the house and received a secret task from Big Brother. She was hidden in the Diary Room and she watched the promo videos of every housemate who enters after her. Her task was to say, according to what she thinks from the promos, who will be the first evicted and who will be the winner. After the entering of the housemates, she announced her decision in Diary Room. According to Shir, Israel will be the first evicted and Katya will be the winner. Because of that, Israel was automatically nominated and Katya will live in a special area of the house, where she'll have the luxury.
- ^Note 2: Israel, Rotem, Niro, Moty, Ariana and Itzik were initially nominated. However, as a new housemate, Stella had the power to save one of the nominees and replace him. She chose to save Itzik and replaced him with Shir.
- ^Note 3: Rotem, Niro, Katya, Itzik, Moty and Natalie were initially nominated. However, after Itzik won a task, he saved himself and replaced him with Stav.
- ^Note 4: This week nominees were determined by the weekly task. There would be 3 games, and whoever stays in the prison after the final of the task would be nominated. They were Niro, Stella, Moshik and Natalie.
- ^Note 5: Niro, Stella, Moshik and Natalie were initially nominated. However, after Stella won a task, she saved herself and replaced her with Shir.
- ^Note 6: Niro, Stella, Rotem and Itzik were initially nominated. However, after Stella won a task, she saved herself and replaced her with Moshik.
- ^Note 7: Everyone was automatically nominated, with two housemates being evicted on Sunday.
- ^Note 8: The public voted for who they wanted to win.

== Nominations totals received ==
	Week 1	Week 2	Week 3	Week 4	Week 5	Final	Total
Moshik	0	0	–	0	–	Winner	0
Niro	4	6	–	3	–	Runner-up	13
Shir	1	0	–	2	–	3rd place	3
Itzik	2	2	–	3	–	4th place	7
Stella	Not in House	0	–	3	–	5th place	3
Stav	0	0	–	1	–	Evicted	1
Moti	2	2	–	0	–	Evicted	4
Rotem	3	4	–	4	Evicted		11
Natally	1	2	–	Evicted			3
Katya	1	4	Evicted				5
Israel	–	Walked					0
Ariana	8	Evicted					8
