= Uri Kabiri =

Israeli musical artist

Uri Kabiri אורי כבירי
- Born: June 3, 1970 (age 55)
- Origin: Jerusalem
- Occupation(s): songwriter, actor, musical producer

Uri Kabiri (Hebrew: אורי כבירי; born June 3, 1970) is an Israeli songwriter, actor and musical producer.

== Biography ==
Uri Kabiri was born in Jerusalem. After his parents divorced, he moved with his mother to Rehovot. He learned to play several musical instruments at an early age, but focused mainly on keyboard. In 1979, when Kabiri was nine, he began to take drum lessons. His mother married the drum teacher and in 1982, they opened a drum school in Tel Aviv. Kabiri helped to run the school's recording studio.

== Acting career ==
In 1986, Kabiri played the part of Gadi Fishenzon in the cult film Alex Holeh Ahavah. In 1988, Kabiri appeared in Tel Aviv - Los Angeles by Dudu Topaz. In 1988-1991, he served in the Israel Defense Forces as a member of the Israel Air Force band.

== Music career ==
In 1992 he began working as a dub artist for children's TV shows, including Video Power, Mr. Bogus and The Adventures of Tiny Toons. In the 1990s, Kabiri composed and arranged theme songs for children's shows and Israeli comedians. Between 1992 and 2009, Kabiri was one of the producers, instrumental players, musical arrangers, recording technicians and backup singers of Dana International, including the 1998 Eurovision Song Contest's winner "Diva". Kabiri worked with Maya Simantov and composed music for films, among them (Dawg, Kickin' It Old Skool) and TV (Sex and the City, The Sopranos, Malcolm in the Middle, MTV's MADE). In 2011, he announced that he was moving to Nashville, Tennessee to further his career.
