= Big Brother VIP (Israeli TV series) season 1 =

Big Brother VIP
- Season 1
- Presented by: Erez Tal; Assi Azar
- No. of days: 31
- No. of housemates: 13
- Winner: Dudi Melitz
- Runner-up: Shimi Tavori
- No. of episodes: 10

Release
- Original network: Channel 2 (Keshet)
- Original release: March 1 – March 31, 2009

Season chronology
- Next → Season 2

HaAh HaGadol VIP (Hebrew: האח הגדול VIP; lit. The Big Brother VIP) started on March 1, 2009, and ended on March 31, 2009. The VIP season was the second season of the Israeli version of the Big Brother series and the first season of the VIP series. The show follows the main Big Brother rules, but with some changes. For example, in VIP Big Brother the show's duration is shorter – a month (31 Days – like in most of the countries it is aired in). Thirteen celebrity housemates spent a period of five weeks together in the Big Brother House. Housemates include singers, models, a fashion designer, a journalist and other well-known Israeli personalities.

The housemates were not told who the other people who were entering the house would be, but were aware of the predictions that were made in the media, particularly that of Guy Pines which accurately predicted the majority of the housemates.

== Details ==
Hosts: Erez Tal and Assi Azar
Producer: Elad Kuperman
Channel: Channel 2
Company Of Broadcast in Channel 2: Keshet

== Housemates ==
=== Adi ===
Adi Neumann is a 26-year-old female model.

=== Amir ===
Amir Fey Guttman is a 32-year-old gay singer.(d.2017)

=== Corinne ===
Corinne Allal is a 53-year-old lesbian musician and singer.

=== Daniella ===
Daniella Pick is a 25-year-old singer. She is the daughter of a well-known Israeli musician Svika Pick.

=== Dudi ===
Dudi Melitz is a 27-year-old male model and restaurateur. He was previously engaged to Maya Bouskilla which also participated in the show. He entered to make Maya cause drama and tension. He was the last to enter the house.

=== Guy ===
Guy Lubelchik is a 19-year-old model and athlete.

=== Kochi ===
Kochi Mordechai is a 34-year-old lawyer. She was married to Israeli politician Yitzhak Mordechai.

=== Maya ===
Maya Bouskilla is a 31-year-old singer. Maya was previously engaged to Dudi Melitz, but canceled the wedding in February 2006. She was surprised to see him in the house.

=== Menahem ===
Menahem Ben is a 60-year-old literature critic for the Israeli newspaper Maariv.

=== Pnina ===
Pnina Tornai is a 46-year-old wedding fashion designer.

=== Sharona ===
Sharona Pick is a 28-year-old singer. She is the daughter of the well-known Israeli musician Svika Pick.

=== Shimi ===
Shimi Tavori is a 55-year-old singer.

=== Yossi ===
Yossi Milstein (born Peter Karpatian) is a 31-year-old publicist. He was the former publicist of Arcadi Gaydamak.

== Nominations table ==
	Week 1	Week 2	Week 3	Week 4		
	Week 1	Week 2	Week 3	Day 29	Final	
Dudi	Daniella, Kochi	Daniella, Kochi	Amir, Menachem	No; Nominations	Winner (Day 31)	
Shimi	Daniella, Maya	Amir, Maya	Amir, Maya	No; Nominations	Runner-up (Day 31)	
Menachem	Kochi, Yossi	Daniella, Kochi	Dudi, Pnina	No; Nominations	Third place (Day 31)	
Pnina	Adi, Menachem	Amir, Maya	Maya, Menachem	No; Nominations	Fourth place (Day 31)	
Corinne	Menachem, Sharona	Menachem, Sharona	Menachem, Sharona	No; Nominations	Fifth place (Day 31)	
Guy	Menachem, Sharona	Dudi, Shimi	Menachem, Pnina	No; Nominations	Evicted (Day 29)	
Adi	Dudi, Menachem	Menachem, Shimi	Menachem, Dudi	No; Nominations	Evicted (Day 29)	
Sharona	Guy, Menachem	Corinne, Menachem	Dudi, Pnina	No; Nominations	Evicted (Day 29)	
Amir	Menachem, Shimi	Dudi, Shimi	Dudi, Pnina	Evicted (Day 24)		
Maya	Dudi, Menachem	Menachem, Shimi	Dudi, Pnina	Evicted (Day 24)		
Kochi	Dudi, Menachem	Dudi, Menachem	Evicted (Day 17)			
Daniella	Menachem, Shimi	Menachem, Shimi	Evicted (Day 17)			
Yossi	Dudi, Guy	Evicted (Day 10)				
Notes	^{1}	none	none	^{2}	^{3}	
Nominated For Eviction	Dudi, Maya, Menachem, Yossi	Amir, Daniella, Dudi, Kochi, Maya, Menachem, Shimi	Amir, Dudi, Maya, Menachem, Pnina	All; Housemates		
Evicted	Yossi	Daniella	Maya	Sharona	Corinne; Fewest votes to win	Pnina; Fewest votes to win
Evicted	Yossi	Daniella	Maya	Adi	Menachem; Fewest votes to win	Shimi; Fewest votes to win
Evicted	Yossi	Kochi	Amir	Adi	Menachem; Fewest votes to win	Shimi; Fewest votes to win
Evicted	Yossi	Kochi	Amir	Guy	Dudi; Most votes to win	

=== Notes ===
- ^1 Throughout the first week Amir had to judge the housemates during the tasks and pick three housemates to be nominated for eviction. He had to choose the most antisocial (Yossi), the least talented (Dudi) and the most egotistical (Maya). The two most popular housemates nominated for eviction were Dudi and Menachem.
- ^2 The Housemates were told that all 8 Housemates who stay in the house would be in the final, but they didn't know that 2 days before the final three of them would be evicted from the house and just 5 Housemates would participate in the final. The voting for the final started a week before the final. At the beginning of the last eviction show, the Housemates were told that 3 of them would be evicted at the end of the program and they were asked to pack their suitcases. After the last eviction, the voting didn't stop, just 3 lines were closed (for those who were evicted) and the voting for the other housemates continued.
- ^3 There were no nominations in the final week and the public was voting for housemates to win, rather than be evicted. the housemate with the most SMS votes was the winner.
