= Israel in the Eurovision Song Contest 1986 =

- Eurovision Song Contest 1986
- Participating broadcaster: Israel Broadcasting Authority (IBA)
- Country: Israel
- Selection process: Kdam Eurovision 1986
- Selection date: 27 March 1986

Competing entry
- Song: "Yavo Yom"
- Artist: Moti Giladi and Sarai Tzuriel
- Songwriters: Yoram Zadok; Mordechai Giladi

Placement
- Final result: 19th, 7 points

Participation chronology

Israel was represented at the Eurovision Song Contest 1986 with the song "Yavo Yom", composed by Yoram Zadok, with lyrics by Moti Giladi, and performed by Moti Giladi and Sarai Tzuriel. The Israeli participating broadcaster, the Israel Broadcasting Authority (IBA), selected its entry for the contest through Kdam Eurovision 1986.

== Before Eurovision ==
=== Kdam Eurovision 1986 ===
The Israel Broadcasting Authority (IBA) held the Kdam Eurovision 1986 final on 27 March at the Jerusalem Centre for the Performing Arts in Jerusalem, hosted by Daniel Pe'er and Rivka Michaeli. The votes of seven regional juries across Israel decided the winner.

The winning entry was "Yavo Yom" performed by Moti Giladi and Sarai Tzuriel and composed by Yoram Zadok, with lyrics written by Giladi.

Final – 27 March 1986
| R/O | Artist | Song | Points | Place |
|---|---|---|---|---|
| 1 | Yehuda Tamir | "Na'ara" (נערה) | 43 | 4 |
| 2 | Shlishiyat Adama | "La ve'li" (לה ולי) | 17 | 10 |
| 3 | Miri Aloni | "Kmo ha'emuna" (כמו האמונה) | 26 | 8 |
| 4 | Moti Giladi and Sarai Tzuriel | "Yavo Yom" (יבוא יום) | 66 | 1 |
| 5 | Boaz Sharabi | "Halevai" (הלוואי) | 1 | 12 |
| 6 | Doron Mazar | "Nagni li balalaika" (נגני לי בללייקה) | 56 | 2 |
| 7 | Rita | "Shvil ha'bricha" (שביל הבריחה) | 43 | 4 |
| 8 | Shula Chen | "Gitara" (גיטרה) | 17 | 10 |
| 9 | Arba Lev Adom | "Yesh" (יש) | 24 | 9 |
| 10 | Isolir Band | "Kafe o te" (קפה או תה) | 40 | 6 |
| 11 | Svika Pick | "Layla layla" (לילה לילה) | 27 | 7 |
| 12 | Haim Moshe | "Le'chaim" (לחיים) | 46 | 3 |

Detailed Regional Jury Votes
| R/O | Song | Tel Aviv | Eilat | Jerusalem | Golan Heights | Haifa | Herzliya | Or Akiva | Total |
|---|---|---|---|---|---|---|---|---|---|
| 1 | "Na'ara" | 6 | 8 | 6 | 3 | 5 | 7 | 8 | 43 |
| 2 | "La ve'li" | 1 | 1 | 4 | 5 | 6 | | | 17 |
| 3 | "Kmo ha'emuna" | 5 | 5 | 1 | 6 | | 5 | 4 | 26 |
| 4 | "Yavo Yom" | 12 | 10 | 10 | 8 | 12 | 8 | 6 | 66 |
| 5 | "Halevai" | | | | | | | 1 | 1 |
| 6 | "Nagni li balalaika" | 7 | 7 | 12 | 4 | 8 | 6 | 12 | 56 |
| 7 | "Shvil ha'bricha" | 4 | 12 | 7 | 7 | 7 | 1 | 5 | 43 |
| 8 | "Gitara" | 3 | | | | 4 | 10 | | 17 |
| 9 | "Yesh" | 10 | 2 | 2 | 2 | 3 | 2 | 3 | 24 |
| 10 | "Kafe o te" | 8 | 4 | 3 | 10 | 10 | 3 | 2 | 40 |
| 11 | "Layla layla" | | 6 | 8 | 1 | 1 | 4 | 7 | 27 |
| 12 | "Le'chaim" | 2 | 3 | 5 | 12 | 2 | 12 | 10 | 46 |
Spokespersons
Tel Aviv – Dani Lewinstein; Eilat – Aviva Metz; Jerusalem – Menachem Perry; Golan Heights – Yaakov Belsenbaum; Haifa – Amnon Peer; Herzliya – Gaby Yinon; Or Akiva – Benny Uri

== At Eurovision ==
Moti Giladi and Sarai Tzuriel performed eleventh on the night of the contest, following Switzerland and preceding Ireland. At the close of the voting it had received 7 points, placing 19th in a field of 20 competing countries. Up to that point, it was the worst-ranking song Israel had sent to the Contest, and it would remain so until 1993.

=== Voting ===
Points awarded to Israel
| Score | Country |
|---|---|
| 12 points | |
| 10 points | |
| 8 points | |
| 7 points | |
| 6 points | |
| 5 points | Switzerland |
| 4 points | |
| 3 points | |
| 2 points | |
| 1 point | France; Norway |

Points awarded by Israel
| Score | Country |
|---|---|
| 12 points | Switzerland |
| 10 points | Denmark |
| 8 points | Netherlands |
| 7 points | Portugal |
| 6 points | Ireland |
| 5 points | Belgium |
| 4 points | Luxembourg |
| 3 points | Turkey |
| 2 points | United Kingdom |
| 1 point | Yugoslavia |
