= Wind (band) =

German musical group

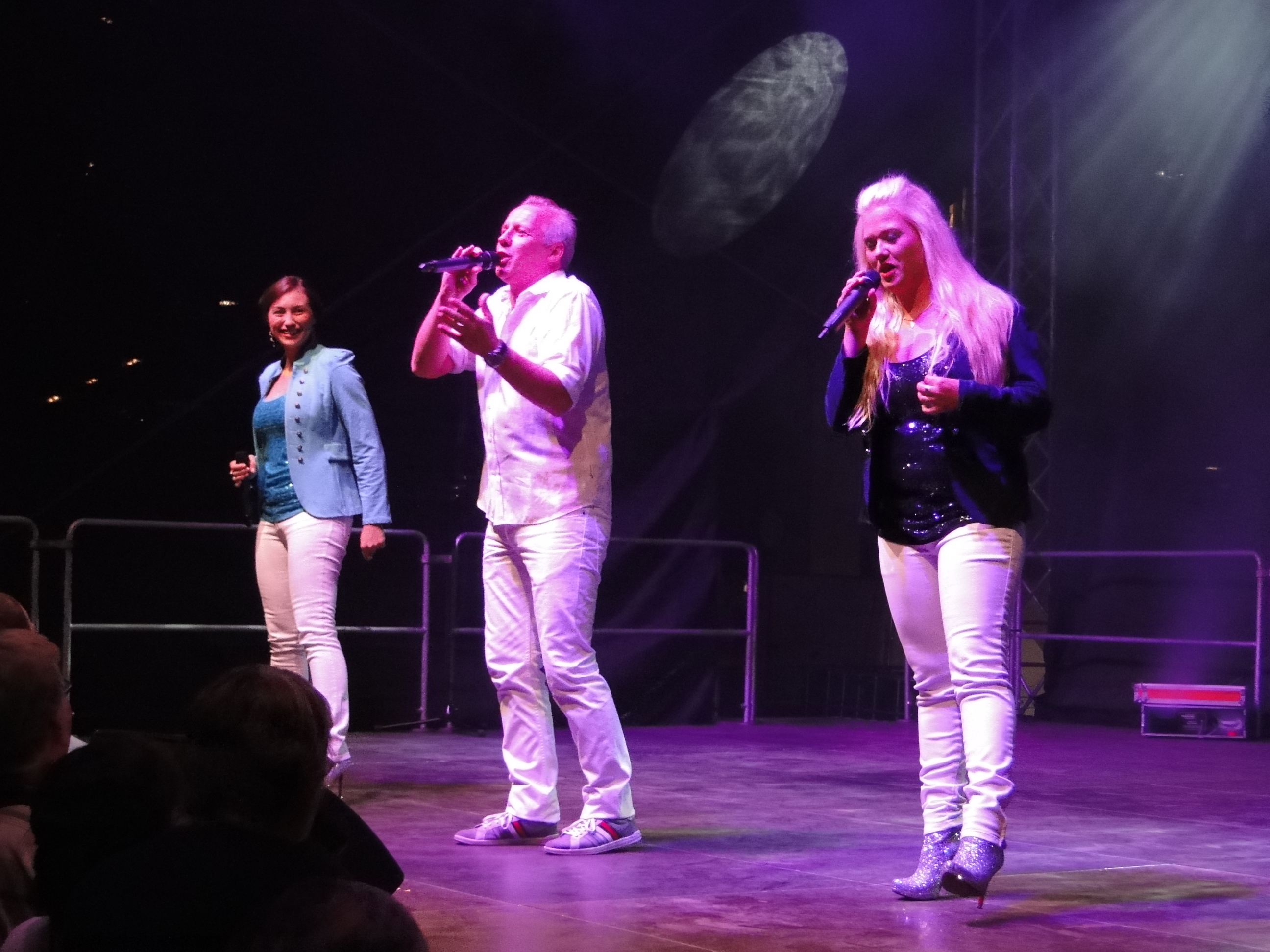
- Wind band in 2013

Background information
- Origin: West Germany
- Years active: since 1985
- Members: Andreas Lebbing; Iris Criens née Remmertz; Carolin Frölian
- Past members: Alexander "Ala" Heiler; Christiane von Kutschenbach; Rainer Höglmeier; Willie Jakob; Sami Kalifa; Petra Scheeser; Angela Kötzsch; Albert Oberloher; Natasja Marinkovic; Rob Pilatus

Wind is a German musical group that mostly plays schlager music. The band is still active, more than 30 years after its foundation.

== History ==
The group was started in 1985 by the composer Hanne Haller. The members of the band at that time were Alexander "Ala" Heiler, Christiane von Kutschenbach, Rainer Höglmeier, Willie Jakob, Sami Kalifa and Petra Scheeser.

The group has participated in the Eurovision Song Contest for Germany three times. The first time was shortly after the formation of the band, in Eurovision 1985. With the song "Für alle" ("For Everyone") they finished second, just behind the winning duo Bobbysocks from Norway. In 1987 Wind returned to the contest, performing "Laß die Sonne in dein Herz" ("Let the Sun in Your Heart") in Brussels, Belgium. Once again they achieved a second place, this time behind Johnny Logan who represented Ireland. "Laß die Sonne in dein Herz" has since become the band's trademark tune, including welcoming visitors to their official website. Wind entered Eurovision for a third time in 1992 in Malmö, Sweden, with the song "Träume sind für alle da" ("Dreams Are For Everyone"). This time they were not as successful, finishing 16th of 23 participants. According to John Kennedy O'Connor in his book The Eurovision Song Contest: The Official History, Wind are the only act to ever finish second in the contest on two occasions.

In the period since 1997 they have released more than 15 singles.

Rainer Höglmeier left the group in the mid-1980s and relocated to the United States. He continues to record solo music for the German market.

Since the late 1990s, Wind consisted of Andreas Lebbing (who sang lead on Laß die Sonne in dein Herz in the 1987 Eurovision Song Contest), Nastasja Marinkovic, Albert Oberloher, and Iris Remmertz (later Criens). Marinkovic left the group briefly in 2005 and was replaced by Angela Kötzsch; she returned to the group in 2006.

In late 2008, Albert Oberloher left Wind to pursue his own interests. According to his website, he left the band "due to different ideas about the artistic direction (of the group)."

Wind continued from there as a trio with Andreas Lebbing, Natasja Marinkovic, and Iris Criens. At the end of 2010, Marinkovic once again left the group, replaced by Carolin Frölian.

== Discography ==
=== Albums ===
- Für alle (For all, 1985)
- Stürmische Zeiten (Stormy times, 1985)
- Jeder hat ein Recht auf Liebe (Everybody's got a right for love, 1987)
- Laß die Sonne in dein Herz (Let the sun shine in your heart, 1987)
- Let the Sun Shine in Your Heart (1987)
- Alles klar (Everything ready, 1989)
- Frischer Wind (New efforts, lit. Fresh wind, 1998)
- Hitze (Heat, 1990)
- Total verliebt (Totally in love, 1994)
- Mit Herz und Seele (With heart and soul, 1995)
- Die ganze Nacht an dich gedacht (The whole night only thought of you, 2000)
- Sonnenklar (As clear as the sun, 2001)
- Kein Weg zu weit (No way too far, 2002)
- Nur mit dir und sofort (Only with you and right now, 2002)
- Mach mich an (Turn me on, 2004)
- Sonne auf der Haut (Sun on the skin, 2004)
- Wunderbar (Wonderful, 2004)
- Nimm mich mit (Take me with you, 2005)
- Schön war die Zeit (Times were beautiful, 2007)
- Für alle (For all, 2007 - differs from 1985 album and features the most recent members of the group)
- Leb deinen Traum – Unsere größten Hits (Live Your Dreams - Our Greatest Hits, 2008)
- Winterwonderland (Winter Wonderland, 2008)
- Auf Kurs (On Track, 2009)
- Drei Gesichter (Three Faces, 2012)
- Für Deutschland (For Germany, 2014)
- Liebes Leben (Dear Life, 2017)
- Startbereit (Ready To Go, 2022)

=== DVD ===
- Sonnenklar (2001)
- Wunderbar...our dreams come true (Live) (2006)

Preceded by Mary Roos with Aufrecht geh'n	Germany in the Eurovision Song Contest; 1985	Succeeded by Ingrid Peters with Über die Brücke geh'n
Preceded by Ingrid Peters with Über die Brücke geh'n	Germany in the Eurovision Song Contest; 1987	Succeeded by Maxi & Chris Garden with Lied für einen Freund
Preceded by Atlantis 2000 with Dieser Traum darf niemals sterben	Germany in the Eurovision Song Contest; 1992	Succeeded by Münchener Freiheit with Viel zu weit
