= Lise Haavik =

Norwegian singer (born 1962)

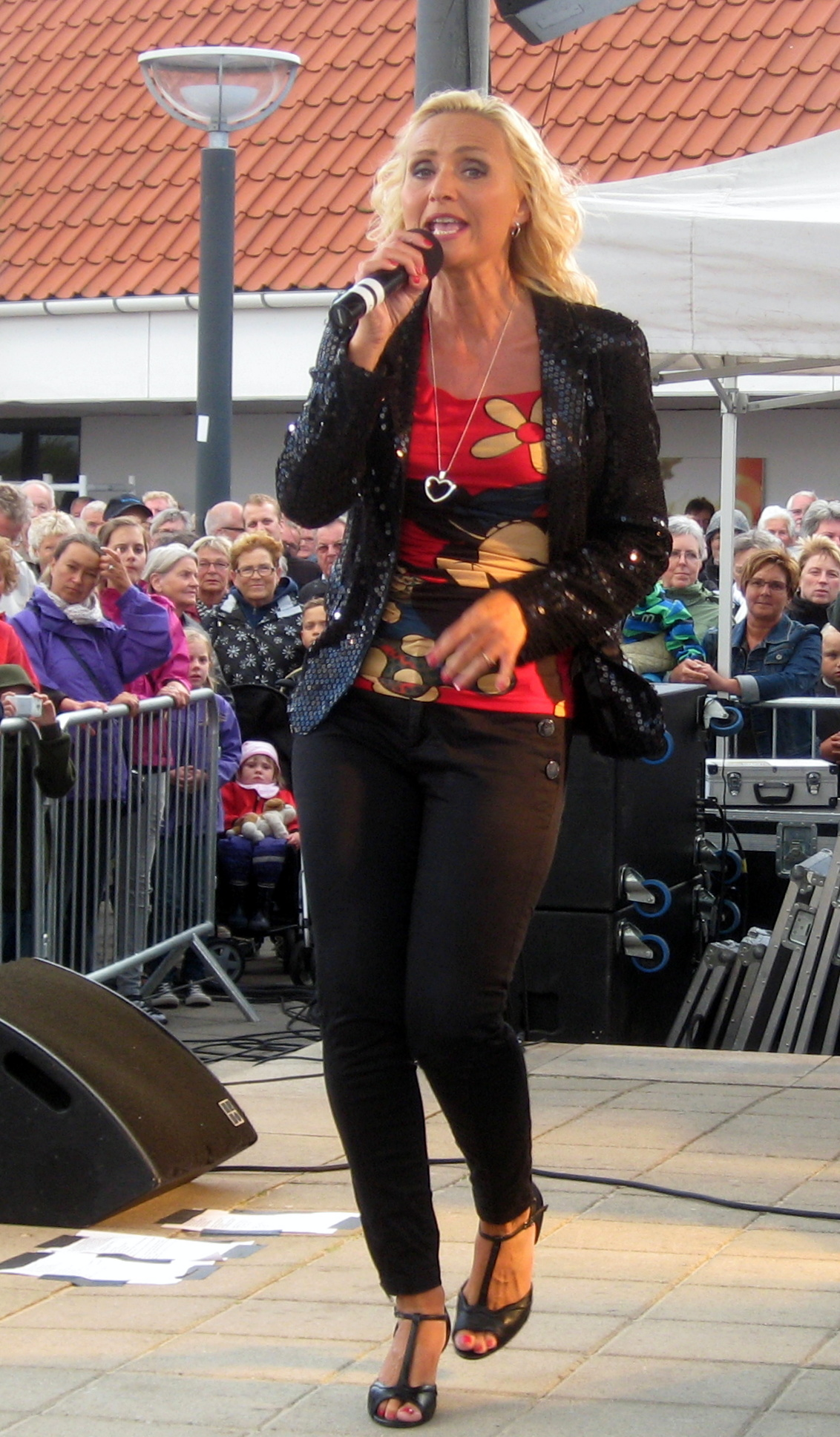
- Lise Haavik in Blokhus, Denmark, 2012

Background information
- Born: 23 February 1962 (age 64); Narvik, Norway
- Origin: Odense, Denmark
- Genres: Pop, schlager, soul, jazz
- Occupation: Singer
- Years active: 1983–present
- Label: Phonofile AS
- Website: www.lisehaavik.com

Lise Haavik (born 23 February 1962) is a Norwegian–Danish singer. She represented Denmark at the Eurovision Song Contest 1986. She is also well-known domestically for her partnership in the duo Trax with John Hatting, her ex-husband.

== Biography ==
=== Early life ===
Lise Haavik was born in Narvik, Norway on 23 February 1962. She moved to Denmark in 1982 to study economics at the University of Odense and the Copenhagen Business School. Haavik partnered with John Hatting in late 1983 and they soon married. At that point, she pursued music full-time and stopped her economics studies.

=== Musical career ===
One year after moving to Denmark, Haavik entered the weekly magazine "Se & Hør" (See and Hear) amateur song contest, where she placed second. She soon after met John Hatting late in 1983 when he advertised through a record company for a female singer with whom he could start a duo. The company sent Haavik, and they formed the duo "Trax".

She represented Denmark at the Eurovision Song Contest 1986 with the song "Du er fuld af løgn" (You are full of lies). While both partners were present at the Contest, only Haavik sang and was credited during the performance (Hatting would be credited earlier on as composer). The song was successful in the Contest, placing sixth out of 20 entries that evening. This would be the only time Haavik would appear at Eurovision, having tried and failed to represent Denmark in 1984 and 1985. She also made an attempt to represent Norway in 1988.

Haavik continues to work in music, with her most recent offering, the English language "Cry Me a River", released in 2007.

== See also ==
- 1980s § Music

Preceded by Hot Eyes with Sku' du spørg' fra no'en?	Denmark in the Eurovision Song Contest; 1986	Succeeded by Anne-Cathrine Herdorf & Bandjo with En lille melodi
