= Circus (Canadian TV series) =

Canadian television variety show

Circus is a Canadian television variety show, which aired on CTV from 1978 to 1985. Airing in an early-evening slot aimed at children and families, the show featured various circus acts performing in a television studio instead of a traditional circus venue.

The show's original hosts were Cal Dodd and Sherisse Laurence, who were replaced in later seasons by Pierre Lalonde. All of the hosts were also singers, who would sometimes perform songs in between circus acts, as well as the show's opening theme song.

It originally aired on April 16, 1978, as a one-off special, becoming a weekly series in the fall due to its popularity. It was the highest-rated Canadian entertainment program in its first season, leading CTV to expand it from half an hour to a full hour in its second season, although the one-hour format was not as popular and the show reverted to a half-hour format in 1980. In the one-hour season, comedian Billy Van appeared as Spats the Clown, but did not continue in this role after the show returned to a half-hour format.

The series was also sold into syndication in the United States and internationally.

The series was cancelled by CTV in 1985.
