= Menahem Ben =

Israeli poet (1948–2020)

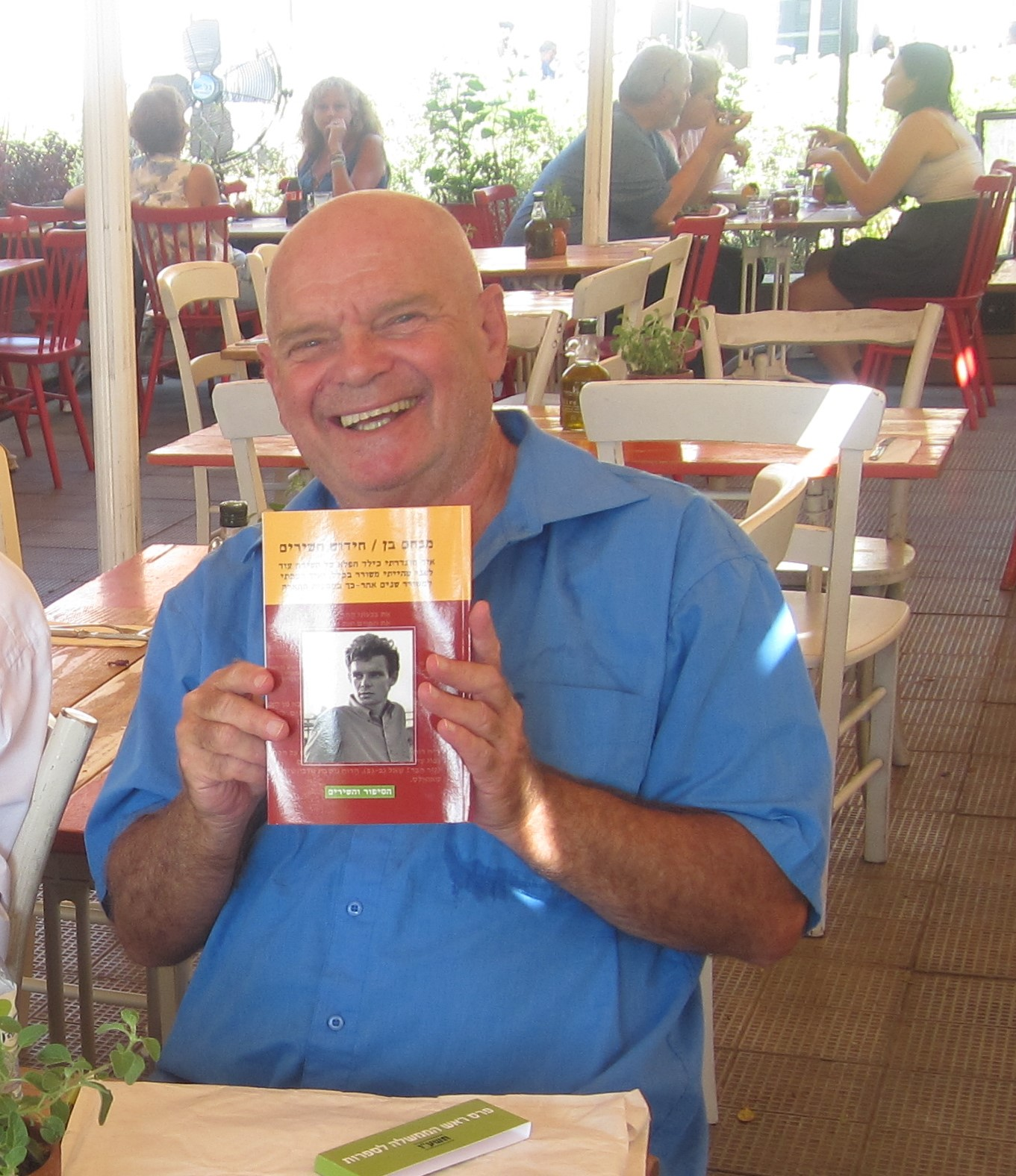

Menahem Ben (Hebrew: מנחם בן; October 31, 1948 – March 13, 2020) was an Israeli poet and journalist and an outspoken literary and culture critic. He was a frequent op-ed contributor and authored two weekly columns, on culture and literature, in the Maariv daily newspaper, as well as a monthly book review page in that paper's literary supplement. He specialized in publishing provocative opinions, for instance that Charles Darwin's theory of evolution is an "idiotic idea" (Haaretz, 30 November 2017).

== Biography ==
Menahem Ben (originally Braun), was born in Dzierżoniów, Poland in 1948. His family immigrated to Israel in 1949.

He participated in reality the show HaAh HaGadol VIP (2009), reaching 3rd place.

== Books ==
In addition to his work of critical writing in the Israeli press, Menahem Ben published eighteen books, including poetry, children's literature, translations and essays. In 2006, he published a volume of criticism: From Shlomo the King (King Solomon) to Shlomo Artzi.

== Prizes ==
- In 1989, Ben was awarded the Prime Minister's Prize for Hebrew Literary Works.
- In 1998, he received the Bernstein Prize, in the Literary Criticism category.
