= Sandra Kim =

Belgian singer

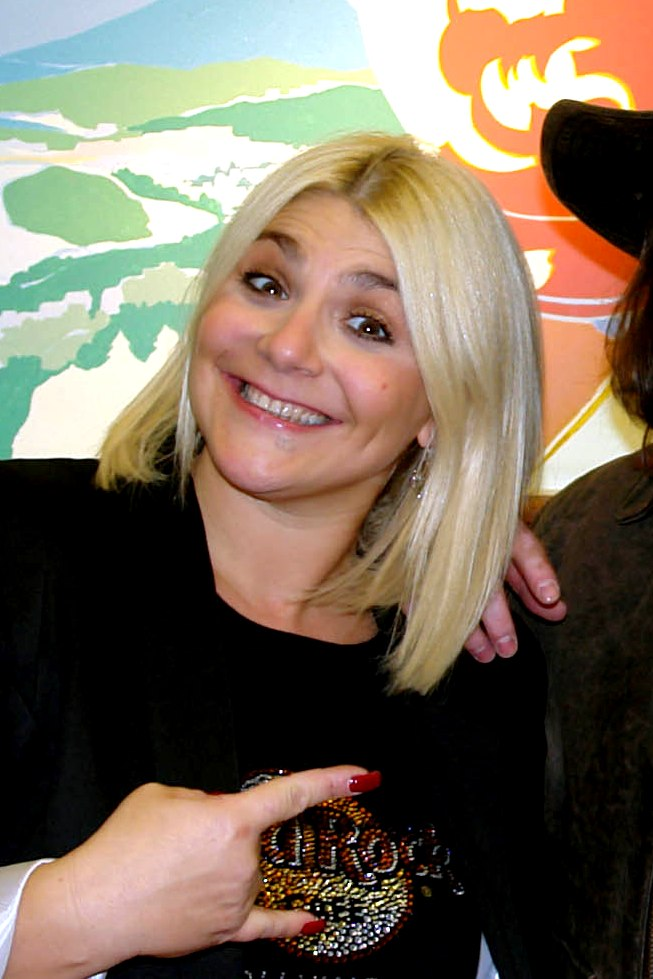
- Kim in 2012
- Born: Sandra Caldarone; 15 October 1972 (age 53); Montegnée, Belgium
- Occupation: Singer
- Spouses: Olivier Gerard (m. 1994; div. 1995) Jurgen Delanghe (m. 2001)

Sandra Caldarone (born 15 October 1972), better known as Sandra Kim, is a Belgian singer who won the Eurovision Song Contest 1986 in Bergen, Norway.

== Early life ==
Kim was born in Montegnée, near Liège, to a hairdresser mother and accordionist father, and started singing when she was seven. Her father was an Italian immigrant from Torrebruna in the province of Chieti in the Abruzzo region of Italy.

== Career ==
=== 1986: Eurovision Song Contest ===
At the time of her Eurovision win, she was only 13 years old, making her the youngest winner of the contest, even though the lyrics of her song "J'aime la vie" ("I love life") imply that she is 15; the Swiss petitioned to have the song disqualified after her real age was revealed. This petition ended up failing and Kim went on to win that year's Eurovision Song Contest. Kim also represented Belgium at the Yamaha Music Festival in Tokyo during the autumn of 1986 and sang the title song for the French animated television series Il était une fois... la vie.

=== Subsequent ventures ===
Kim's pop rock album Make Up was released on 12 May 2011, containing songs written by famous Belgian artists like Salvatore Adamo, Dani Klein (Vaya Con Dios), Ozark Henry, Anthony Sinatra (Piano Club), Jacques Duval and David Bartholomé (Sharko).

In 2020, Kim won the first season of the Flemish version of The Masked Singer as "Queen".

In March 2023, Kim was a guest celebrity judge in the episode A deux c’est mieux of the Belgian French-language reality television series Drag Race Belgique, which was broadcast on Tipik.

As of 2026, she still performs a couple of concerts a month, some unplugged and some with her band.

== Personal life ==
In 1994, Kim married Olivier Gerard. They divorced a year later. She has been married to Jurgen Delanghe since 2001, with whom she lives in a rural village near Sint-Truiden.

== Discography ==
=== Albums ===
- J'aime la vie (1986, French)
- Bien dans ma peau (1988, French)
- Balance tout (1991, French) / Met open ogen (1991, Dutch)
- Les Sixties (1993, French) / Sixties (1993, Dutch)
- Onvergetelijk (1997, Dutch)
- Heel diep in mijn hart (1998, Dutch, 2-track single)
- Make Up (2011, English and French)

=== Singles ===
- "Ami-ami" (French, 1985)
- "Tokyo Boy" (French, 1986)
- "Sorry" (French, 1987)
- "Bel me, schrijf me" (duet with Flemish singer Luc Steeno, Dutch, 1989)
- "Anyway the Wind Blows" (2010, English)
- "Who Are You" (2020, English)
- "Inner Hero" (with Celien Hermans, English, 2025)

Awards and achievements
Preceded by (Norway) Bobbysocks! with "La det swinge"	Winner of the Eurovision Song Contest; 1986	Succeeded by (Republic of Ireland) Johnny Logan with "Hold Me Now"
Preceded by Linda Lepomme with "Laat me nu gaan"	Belgium in the Eurovision Song Contest; 1986	Succeeded by Liliane Saint-Pierre with "Soldiers of Love"
