= France in the Eurovision Song Contest 1986 =

- Eurovision Song Contest 1986
- Participating broadcaster: Antenne 2
- Country: France
- Selection process: L'Eurovision 1986
- Selection date: 22 March 1986

Competing entry
- Song: "Européennes"
- Artist: Cocktail Chic
- Songwriters: Georges Costa; Michel Costa

Placement
- Final result: 17th, 13 points

Participation chronology

France was represented at the Eurovision Song Contest 1986 with the song "Européennes", written by Georges Costa and Michel Costa, and performed by Cocktail Chic. The French participating broadcaster, Antenne 2, selected its entry through a national final.

== Before Eurovision ==
=== L'Eurovision 1986 ===
Antenne 2 held the national final, L'Eurovision 1986, on 22 March 1986 at the SFP Studios in Paris, hosted by Patrice Laffont.

Fourteen songs made it to the national final, which was broadcast across France and to the overseas departments. The winner was decided by a sample of television viewers who were telephoned at random and asked their opinion of each song. The winning entry was "Européennes", performed by the quartet Cocktail and composed by Georges Costa and Michel Costa.

R/O	Artist	Song	Points	Place
1	Daisy Clerc	"Homme de lumière"	133	3
2	Véronique Bodoin	"Paris le dimanche matin"	30	13
3	Sandrine Doukhan	"J'aimerai demain"	63	7
4	Christine Gavalet	"Nuit blanche"	35	12
5	Yves de Roubaix	"Vivre longtemps"	147	2
6	King Kong & Les Limousines	"Stop l'amour, pas d'amour"	67	6
7	Duo Plaisir	"Eurovision"	43	9
8	Cocktail	"Européennes"	158	1
9	Claire Axèle	"Mélodie"	76	5
10	Jean-Louis Richerme	"La roue tourne"	43	9
11	Catherine Perbost	"Fils d'Ellington"	36	11
12	Marc Juillet	"Je vis dans un rêve"	55	8
13	Sonja Wiggers	"Le cœur branché"	24	14
14	Lucille Marciano	"Comme une chanteuse de blues"	113	4

== At Eurovision ==
Before performing at Bergen, Cocktail changed their name to Cocktail Chic. They were the third act on the night of the Contest, following Yugoslavia and preceding Norway. At the close of the voting the song had received 13 points, placing 17th in a field of 20 competing countries. At the time it was the worst placing for France in the Contest's history, and would remain so until 1996.

=== Voting ===
Points awarded to France
Score	Country
12 points	
10 points	
8 points	
7 points	Switzerland
6 points	
5 points	
4 points	
3 points	Norway; Sweden
2 points	
1 point	

Points awarded by France
Score	Country
12 points	Belgium
10 points	United Kingdom
8 points	Luxembourg
7 points	Switzerland
6 points	Spain
5 points	Denmark
4 points	Norway
3 points	Ireland
2 points	Sweden
1 point	Israel
