= Ewa (film) =

- אווה
- Directed by: Haim Tabakman
- Written by: Haim Tabakman; Amit Ron; Orly Ben Nun
- Produced by: David Silber; Ronen Ben Tal; Kristina Larsen; Ewa Puszczyńska; Hanneke Van der Tas
- Starring: Avi Kushnir; Efrat Ben Zur; Gil Frank
- Cinematography: Axel Schneppat
- Edited by: Dov Steuer
- Music by: Efrat Ben Zur; Wojciech Lemański
- Production companies: United King Films; Plan B Productions
- Distributed by: Peccadillo Pictures
- Release date: 2016
- Running time: 85 minutes
- Country: Israel
- Language: Hebrew

Ewa (Hebrew: אווה) is a 2016 Israeli drama film. The film was directed by Haim Tabakman, who previously directed Eyes Wide Open (2009). It centres on a love triangle and the chasm between native-born Jewish Israelis, known as Sabras and the European Jewish Holocaust survivors that arrived in Israel after the Second World War as refugees. The film is a co-production with France and Germany's Arte and Poland's Polish Film Institute. The film was released theatrically in Israel in 2016, followed by a theatrical release in France on. It aired on Arte in France and Germany in 2020.

== Plot ==
Yoel, a Sabra lives a contented life in a rural idyll in Israel with his Polish Holocaust survivor wife, Eva. Unexpectedly, he comes across a letter from the bank, detailing an apartment that he and his wife own. It emerges that a traumatized Polish Holocaust survivor, Emil, lives in the apartment, where he is frequently visited by Ewa, where they engage in an affair. It soon emerges that Emil and Ewa were married in Poland, with Ewa believing that her husband had died in the concentration camps. Emil emerges alive years later in Israel and reestablished a relationship with his wife.

== Cast ==
- Avi Kushnir as Yoel Keenan
- Efrat Ben Zur as Ewa, Yoel's wife, a Polish Holocaust survivor
- Gil Frank as Emil, Ewa's first husband, he was believed to have died in the concentration camps, but later emerged in Israel
- Gaia Shalita Katz as Yehidt, Yoel and Ewa's adult daughter
- Aryeh Hasfari as Young singer
- Noa Koler as Racheli, bank customer service representative
