= Linda Lepomme =

Belgian actress and singer

- Born: 16 March 1955 (age 71); Lokeren, Belgium
- Occupations: Actress, singer

Linda Lepomme (born 16 March 1955) is a Belgian actress and singer who represented her country in the Eurovision Song Contest 1985 in which she sang "Laat me nu gaan". She earned seven points finishing in 19th (last) place overall.

== Filmography ==
- Toch zonde dat 't een hoer is (1978) (TV) ... as Hippolita
- De Paradijsvogels (1979) TV Series ...
- De Eerste sleutel (1980) (TV) ...
- TV-Touché (1983) TV Series ...
- Zware jongens (1984) ... as singer
- Levenslang (1984) (TV)
- De Leeuw van Vlaanderen (1985) as Nele
- Pauline and Paulette (2001) ... as actress

Preceded by Jacques Zegers with "Avanti la vie"	Belgium in the Eurovision Song Contest; 1985	Succeeded by Sandra Kim with "J'aime la vie"
