= Linda Bergen =

German singer (1948–2025)

- Born: Linda Probst; 4 October 1948
- Died: 5 September 2025 (aged 76)
- Occupation: Singer

Linda Probst (4 October 1948 – 5 September 2025), better known by the stage name Linda Bergen, was a German singer.

The sister of fellow singer Ingrid Peters, she had several successful hits in the 1970s after signing with Polydor Records and having songs produced by Kurt Feltz.

Bergen died on 5 September 2025, at the age of 76.

== Discography ==
- Das Tagebuch der Eva Leitner / Mama (1976)
- In Virginia fällt der Regen / Romano (1977)
- Warum gehst du zu ihr / Country-Lady (1978)
- Ich bin nicht so wie Alice / Seit heute Nacht (1979)
