= Cocktail Chic =

French band

Cocktail Chic were a French female singing group. They represented France in the Eurovision Song Contest 1986.

Although the Cocktail Chic name was a one-off for Eurovision, the group, consisting of sisters Dominique Poulain and Catherine Bonnevay and their cousins Francine Chanterau and Martine Latorre, had formed in the late 1960s, originally under the name of Les OP'4. They were spotted by singing star Claude François, who renamed them Les Fléchettes (after Flèche, his newly formed record label). They released several singles under their own name (including French-language versions of such as The Turtles' "Elenore" and The Supremes' "Come See About Me"), but spent most of the 1970s working as backing singers, both on stage and in the studio, for François and other big names. Chanterau and Latorre had Eurovision experience, having been among the backing singers for the victorious Marie Myriam in 1977, and provided backing vocals for four countries at the 1978 contest held in Paris.

Following François' premature death in 1978, their career went on hiatus. In 1986, they returned, now under the name of Cocktail, to take part in the selection for that year's French Eurovision entry, which they duly won with the song "Européennes" ("European Girls"). Having expanded their name to Cocktail Chic, they went forward to the Eurovision Song Contest 1986, held on 3 May in Bergen, Norway. Critics who had branded "Européennes" as musically dreary and lyrically feeble appeared to have their fears confirmed as the song ended the evening in a dismal 17th place of 20 entries, France's worst result in 30 years of Eurovision to that date. Particularly galling to many in France was that the other three French-language songs in that year's contest (from Belgium, Switzerland and Luxembourg), had finished the evening occupying the top three places.

They largely vanished from sight again after their Eurovision appearance. Recent years have however seen a renewed interest in Les Fléchettes recordings in the retro French pop market, and they have reunited to give several interviews in which they discuss their career.

Preceded by Roger Bens with Femme dans ses rêves aussi	France in the Eurovision Song Contest; 1986	Succeeded by Christine Minier with Les mots d'amour n'ont pas de dimanche
