= Sarai Tzuriel =

Israeli dub actor

- שרי צוריאל
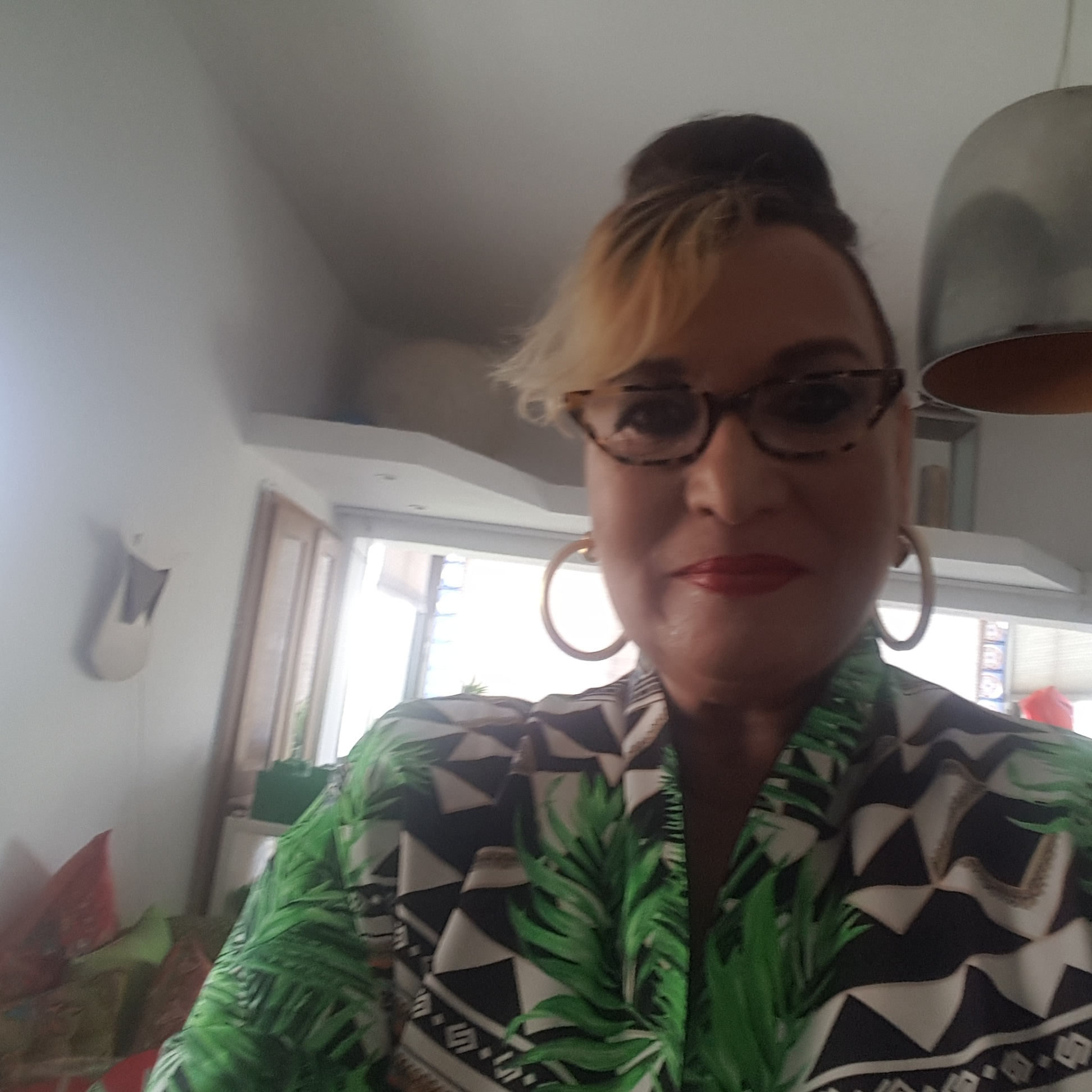
- Tzuriel in 2018
- Born: 24 December 1952 (age 73); Kfar Yehoshua, Israel
- Occupations: Actress; singer
- Years active: 1971–present
- Children: 1

Sarai Tzuriel (Hebrew: שרי צוריאל; born 24 December 1952) is an Israeli actress and singer.

== Biography ==
Sarai Zuriel was born in Kfar Yehoshua in the Jezreel Valley, the daughter of Esther Zuriel (Nems) and Father Zuriel (Cherniak), who were teachers and educators.

At the age of three, she traveled with her family to Baltimore, Maryland in the United States, where her parents were on a mission for the Habonim Dror international socialist-Zionist youth. When she was 12 years old, her family moved to Haifa, Israel, where she attended high school. In 1968–1969, her parents were again sent on a mission to Cleveland, Ohio, and she finished high school there.

She served in the IDF in the Northern Command Band from 1971 to 1973. At the end of her military service, she studied general literature and theater at Tel Aviv University, as well as theatre and literature at Montclair State University, and acting at HB Studio in New York.

Tzuriel is the mother of a son from her second marriage to actor Rafi Tabor.

== Career ==
Tzuriel acted in a number of series and movies as an actress. In 1998, as part of the celebrations of the 50th year of the State of Israel, she appeared in the program "Jubilee of Israeli Fashion".

=== Music ===
Between the years 1976–1979, Tzuriel participated as a model in the main fashion shows of the Hilton Tel Aviv Fashion Week. In the first show, she modeled in the "Leather Garment". she also hosted the show of Export Institute in the same year, and was the house model of a small company called "Rumi" at the Hilton fashion week.

She represented Israel alongside Moti Giladi at the Eurovision Song Contest 1986 in Bergen with the song Yavo Yom.

== Filmography ==
Movie	Year	Role	Notes
Shalosh Arba Hamesh VaHetzi	1980–1984		
The Last Winter	1983	Wounded Man's Wife	
Rechov Sumsum	1987–1991	Kippi Ben Kipod	
Roman Behemshechim	1985	Levia	
Shalom Sesame	1987–	Kippi Ben Kipod	
Sesame Street Stays Up Late!	1993	Kippi Ben Kipod	
Hellbound (film)	1994	Cloritt	
Zaya	1999	Madam Mano	was not released
The Milk Trial	2016	Madam Mano	
