= Sherisse Laurence =

Canadian singer and entertainer

- Born: Selkirk, Manitoba, Canada
- Occupations: Singer, entertainer
- Years active: 1978–present

Sherisse Laurence (later known as Sherisse Stevens) is a Canadian singer and entertainer from Selkirk, Manitoba.

From 1978 to 1983 she hosted the show Circus on CTV in Canada. She was also the host of the Miss Teen Canada pageants in 1982 and 1983, and performed on Canadian television talk shows including The Alan Thicke Show and City Lights.

In 1986 she represented Luxembourg at the Eurovision Song Contest 1986. Her song "L'Amour de ma vie", performed first on the night, was written by Frank Dostal and Alain Garcia and composed by Rolf Soja. The song finished third with 117 points.

In 1988 she released the single "Half a Heart", which was moderately successful on the Canadian country music charts. The single was also released in a French version, "Mon cœur veut ignorer l'amour".

She did not continue a recording career, and instead had various musical theatre roles in the 1990s, 2000s and 2010s, and was usually credited as Sherisse Stevens after 2000. In 2006 she was appointed the musical director of the Huntsville Community Choir in Huntsville, Ontario.

== Discography ==
Year	Single	CAN Country (RPM)	Ref
1988	"Half a Heart"	31	

Preceded by Margo, Franck Olivier, Diane Solomon, Ireen Sheer, Chris & Malcolm Roberts with "Children, Kinder, Enfants"	Luxembourg in the Eurovision Song Contest; 1986	Succeeded by Plastic Bertrand with "Amour, Amour"
