= Ingrid Peters =

German singer (born 1954)

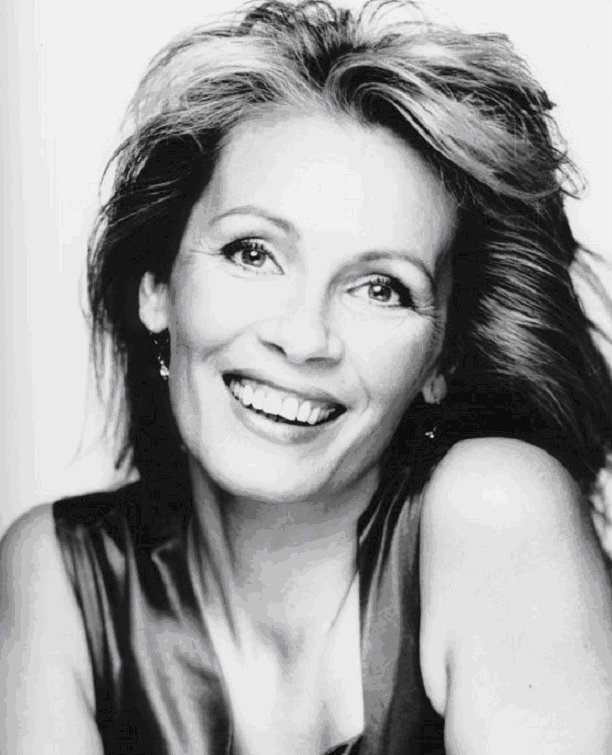

Background information
- Birth name: Ingrid Probst
- Born: 19 April 1954 (age 71) Dudweiler, Saar Protectorate (now part of Saarland, Germany)
- Occupation: Singer

Ingrid Peters (born 19 April 1954) is a German singer.

She represented Germany in the Eurovision Song Contest 1986 held in Bergen. Her song, "Über die Brücke geh'n", placed eight. Peters had made previous attempts to represent Germany. In 1979, she performed a song called "Du bist nicht frei" and in 1983 was runner-up in the national contest with "Viva la mamma". Peters was a special guest on the German national contest in 1987 and 2007.

Sister of Linda Bergen.

Preceded by Wind with Für alle	Germany in the Eurovision Song Contest; 1986	Succeeded by Wind with Laß die Sonne in dein Herz
Preceded by (Netherlands) The Millionaires	OGAE Second Chance Contest winner Retrospective; 1983 (With July Paul)	Succeeded by (Denmark) Forule II
