= Luv Bug =

Northern Irish pop band

- Also known as: Heart of Ice
- Origin: Newry, County Down, Northern Ireland, UK
- Genre: Dance-pop MOR
- Instruments: Vocals, Keyboards, Guitars, Drums
- Years active: 1977 – present
- Past members: June Cunningham; Hugh Cunningham; Max Cunningham; Ricky Meyler; Majella Grant; Brian McArdle; Gerard Bannon

Luv Bug are a Northern Irish pop band originating from Newry. They are most famous for representing Ireland in the Eurovision Song Contest 1986 with the song "You Can Count on Me".

== Career ==
The earliest incarnation of the group were formed as an amateur teenage band in early 1977. Playing local gigs they were then taken on by manager Michael Magill and went professional in late 1982 and consisted of sister and brothers June (lead vocals), Hugh (bass) and Max (guitar) Cunningham along with Ricky Meyler (vocals and keyboards) and Majella Grant (drums).

They became successful as a live act throughout Ireland and released their first single "Red Light Spells Danger" in 1984. The song was a cover of the Billy Ocean track and was followed up by a string of their own compositions, many of which became hits on the Irish Charts. Among their best known hits are "Living in Stereo" (1985), "On My Own" (1986) and "Look at Me I'm Dancing" (1985).

In 1986, they won the National Song Contest with a Kevin Sheeran composition "You Can Count on Me" and competed in that year's Eurovision Song Contest in Norway. They ended the night fourth out of twenty entrants and the song reached the Irish top five.

The group continued successfully, releasing their first album a year later. In 1988 they signed a recording deal with Virgin Records in the UK with two single releases under a different name, Heart of Ice. By the end of the decade the group had toured Europe and had completed some recording work in Los Angeles.

In 1992 the group entered the National Song Contest (now titled Eurosong) again with the song "Close to Your Heart", but lost out to Linda Martin who went on to win the Eurovision song contest that year in Malmö.

Luv Bug still continue today as a four-piece, performing live mainly in Ireland. They are handled by Michael Magill Entertainments and perform for private functions. Their set list is made up of cover versions, with none of their own songs included.

== Discography ==
Singles:

Date	Single	Irish Charts
May 1984	"Red Light Spells Danger"	15
October 1984	"Burn it Up"	22
April 1985	"Look at Me I'm Dancing"	16
August 1985	"Living in Stereo"	24
February 1986	"On My Own"	17
April 1986	"You Can Count on Me"	2
September 1986	"Is There Something I Should Know"	26
December 1986	"Winter's Here"	-
April 1987	"Fall Out"	-
February 1988	"Brand New Heart"	-
October 1988	"Delving Away" (credited to Heart of Ice)	-
February 1989	"Every Time You Leave"	-
November 1989	"Flashback"	-
May 1990	"Living in Stereo" (re-recording) (credited to Heart of Ice)	-
October 1990	"Welcome to My Party"	-
1995	"Call Me" (EP)	-

Album:

- April 1987 – Luv Bug

== See also ==
- Ireland in the Eurovision Song Contest
- Eurovision Song Contest 1986

Awards and achievements
Preceded by Maria Christian with "Wait Until The Weekend Comes"	Ireland in the Eurovision Song Contest; 1986	Succeeded by Johnny Logan with "Hold Me Now"
