= Big Brother VIP (Israeli TV series) season 3 =

Big Brother VIP
- Season 3
- Presented by: Liron Weizman; Guy Zu-Aretz
- No. of days: 50
- No. of housemates: 15
- Winner: Asaf Goren
- Runner-up: Shai Hai
- No. of episodes: 23

Release
- Original network: Reshet 13
- Original release: 12 January – 2 March 2019

Season chronology
- ← Previous; Season 2 Next → Season 4

3 VIP האח הגדול (HaAh HaGadol VIP 3; lit. The Big Brother VIP 3) is the third VIP season of the Israeli version of the Big Brother series, and the first VIP season aired on Reshet 13. The show premiered on January 12, 2019, and concluded 50 days later on March 2.

This season hosted by Liron Weizman and Guy Zu-Aretz. The winner of the season is Asaf Goren.

== Housemates ==
Name	Age	Famous for...	Residence	Day entered	Day exited	Status
Asaf Goren	27	Reality Star, Actor, Dancer, and Athlete	Los Angeles	1	50	Winner
Shai Hai	35	Reality Star, HaAh HaGadol 7 Housemate	Ramat Hasharon	1	50	Runner-up
Ben Zini	22	Actor and Singer	Tel Aviv	1	50	3rd Place
Nataly Dadon	35	Model	Tel Aviv	1	50	4th Place
Adi Leon	43	Composer and keyboardist of Eyal Golan's band	Holon	1	50	5th Place
Orly Tal Revivo	43	President's Residence	Tel Aviv	1	47	10th Evicted
Vicky Knafo	59	Social activist	Mitzpe Ramon	1	47	9th Evicted
Liran Strauber	44	Soccer Player (Goalkeeper)	Yagel	1	43	8th Evicted
Hisham Sulliman	41	Actor and Director	Nazareth Illit	1	40	7th Evicted
Neri Livneh	65	Journalist	Tel Aviv	1	36	6th Evicted
Eden Yohanan	29	Model and Artist	Tel Aviv	1	33	5th Evicted
Ori Gross	44	Screenwriter and filmmaker	Tel Aviv	1	29	4th Evicted
Aviva Tavori	45	Television Personality	Tel Aviv	1	23	3rd Evicted
Romi Nest	22	Model	Ramat Hasharon	1	15	2nd Evicted
Gili Mossinson	40	Basketball Player	Tel Aviv	1	8	1st Evicted

== Nominations table ==
	Week 1	Week 2	Week 3		Week 4	Week 5		Week 6		Week 7	Final	
	Week 1	Week 2	Fake Nominations	Real Nominations	Week 4	Day 30	Day 34	Day 37	Day 41	Week 7	Final	
Asaf	Neri; Eden	Neri; Romi	Vicky; Neri	Exempt	Shai; Neri	No; Nominations	No; Nominations	Shai; Orly	No; Nominations	No; Nominations	Winner (Day 50)	
Shai	Refused	Orly; Eden	Orly; Eden	No; Nominations	Nataly; Eden	No; Nominations	No; Nominations	Asaf; Orly	No; Nominations	No; Nominations	Runner-Up (Day 50)	
Ben	Refused	Eden; Orly	Orly; Nataly	No; Nominations	Orly; Eden	No; Nominations	No; Nominations	Orly; Adi	No; Nominations	No; Nominations	Third place (Day 50)	
Nataly	Neri; Liran	Ben; Liran	Orly; Neri	No; Nominations	Refused	No; Nominations	No; Nominations	Hisham; Orly	No; Nominations	No; Nominations	Fourth place (Day 50)	
Adi	Gili; Aviva	Neri; Ben	Orly; Neri	No; Nominations	Shai; Neri	No; Nominations	No; Nominations	Hisham; Orly	No; Nominations	No; Nominations	Fifth place (Day 50)	
Vicky	Gili; Adi	Orly; Asaf	Asaf; Adi	Exempt	Orly; Adi	No; Nominations	Exempt	Asaf; Shai	No; Nominations	No; Nominations	Evicted (Day 47)	
Orly	Neri; Liran	Ben; Romi	Neri; Shai	No; Nominations	Hisham	No; Nominations	No; Nominations	Liran; Hisham	No; Nominations	No; Nominations	Evicted (Day 47)	
Liran	Neri; Aviva	Orly; Asaf	Orly; Asaf	No; Nominations	Orly; Adi	No; Nominations	No; Nominations	Orly; Adi	No; Nominations	Evicted (Day 43)		
Hisham	Gili; Adi	Eden; Orly	Orly; Eden	No; Nominations	Asaf; Eden	No; Nominations	No; Nominations	Asaf; Ben	Evicted (Day 40)			
Neri	Adi; Vicky	Orly; Asaf	Orly; Adi	No; Nominations	Eden; Nataly	No; Nominations	No; Nominations	Evicted (Day 36)				
Eden	Gili; Neri	Ben; Hisham	Hisham; Shai	No; Nominations	Shai; Neri	No; Nominations	Evicted (Day 33)					
Ori	Vicky; Eden	Aviva; Vicky	Orly; Adi	No; Nominations	Orly; Adi	Evicted (Day 29)						
Aviva	Gili; Ori	Adi; Ori	Orly; Adi	No; Nominations	Evicted (Day 23)							
Romi	Gili; Vicky	Orly; Neri	Evicted (Day 15)									
Gili	Liran; Eden	Evicted (Day 8)										
Note	1, 2											
Nominated (pre-Rescue game)	Ben; Gili; Neri; Shai	Asaf; Ben; Eden; Neri; Orly; Romi	none		Adi; Eden; Hisham; Nataly; Neri; Orly; Shai	none	All; Housemates	none				
Saved	Shai	Neri	none		Adi	none	Vicky	none				
Against public vote	Ben; Eden; Gili; Nataly; Neri	Adi; Asaf; Ben; Eden; Orly; Romi	Adi; Asaf; Eden; Neri; Orly	Adi; Aviva; Ben; Eden; Hisham; Liran; Nataly; Neri; Ori; Orly; Shai	Ben; Eden; Hisham; Nataly; Neri; Ori; Orly; Shai	All; Housemates	Adi; Asaf; Ben; Hisham; Liran; Nataly; Neri; Orly; Shai	Adi; Asaf; Hisham; Orly; Shai	All; Housemates			
Evicted	Gili; Fewest votes to save	Romi; Fewest votes to save	Asaf; Fake eviction	Aviva; Fewest votes to save	Ori; Fewest votes to save	Eden; Fewest votes to save	Neri; Fewest votes to save	Hisham; Fewest votes to save	Liran; Fewest votes to save	Vicky; Fewest votes to save	Adi; Fewest votes	Nataly; Fewest votes
Evicted	Gili; Fewest votes to save	Romi; Fewest votes to save	Asaf; Fake eviction	Aviva; Fewest votes to save	Ori; Fewest votes to save	Eden; Fewest votes to save	Neri; Fewest votes to save	Hisham; Fewest votes to save	Liran; Fewest votes to save	Vicky; Fewest votes to save	Ben; Fewest votes	Shai; Fewest votes
Evicted	Gili; Fewest votes to save	Romi; Fewest votes to save	Asaf; Fake eviction	Aviva; Fewest votes to save	Ori; Fewest votes to save	Eden; Fewest votes to save	Neri; Fewest votes to save	Hisham; Fewest votes to save	Liran; Fewest votes to save	Orly; Fewest votes to save	Ben; Fewest votes	Shai; Fewest votes
Evicted	Gili; Fewest votes to save	Romi; Fewest votes to save	Asaf; Fake eviction	Aviva; Fewest votes to save	Ori; Fewest votes to save	Eden; Fewest votes to save	Neri; Fewest votes to save	Hisham; Fewest votes to save	Liran; Fewest votes to save	Orly; Fewest votes to save	Asaf; Most votes to win	

=== Notes ===
- ^1 : Ben and Shai were automatically nominated for eviction for refused to nominate.
- ^2 : Shai won the 'rescue game', he is no longer nominated. He nominated Eden and Nataly for eviction.

== Nominations totals received ==
	Week 1	Week 2	Week 3		Week 4	Week 5		Week 6		Week 7	Final	Total
Asaf	0	3	1	-	1	-	-	3	-	-	Winner	8
Shai	0	0	2	-	3	-	-	2	-	-	Runner-Up	7
Ben	0	4	0	-	0	-	-	1	-	-	3rd place	5
Nataly	0	0	1	-	2	-	-	0	-	-	4th place	3
Adi	3	1	4	-	3	-	-	2	-	-	5th place	13
Orly	0	7	8	-	4	-	-	6	-	-	Evicted	25
Vicky	3	1	1	-	0	-	-	0	-	-	Evicted	5
Liran	3	1	0	-	0	-	-	1	-	Evicted		5
Hisham	0	1	1	-	1	-	-	3	Evicted			6
Neri	5	3	4	-	3	-	-	Evicted				15
Eden	3	3	2	-	4	-	Evicted					12
Ori	1	1	0	-	0	Evicted						2
Aviva	2	1	0	-	Evicted							3
Romi	0	2	Evicted									2
Gili	6	Evicted										6

== Big Brother House and Sewage ==
For the first time, the housemates will be split into two groups on the opening night, as part of the first task. One group will live in the Big Brother House, and the other group will live in the Sewage under the Big Brother House. On Day 3, the task ended. All Sewage housemates were moved to the Big Brother House.

	Day 1–2	Day 2–3	Day 3
Adi	Big Brother House	Sewage	Big Brother House
Asaf	Sewage		
Aviva	Sewage	Big Brother House	
Ben	Sewage		
Eden	Big Brother House		
Gili	Big Brother House		
Hisham	Big Brother House		Sewage
Liran	Big Brother House		
Nataly	Big Brother House		Sewage
Neri	Big Brother House		
Ori	Sewage		Big Brother House
Orly	Sewage		
Romi	Sewage		
Shai	Sewage		
Vicky	Big Brother House		

=== Summary ===
- On Day 1, during the opening event, Adi Leon is the first housemate to enter the Big Brother House. After he entered the house, he was immediately called to the Diary Room. Adi received a secret task from Big Brother, he had the power to divide the incoming housemates to live in the Big Brother House or in Sewage. At the end of the show, Adi must make a decision. If he enters the Sewage, he will gain immunity. If he enters the Big Brother House, he won't receive an immunity. He chose to enter the Big Brother House officially.
- On Day 2, Aviva and Adi exchanged their place, because Aviva found it difficult to live in Sewage, Adi volunteered to exchange his place in the Big Brother House with Aviva.
- On Day 3, the Big Brother asked Adi to replace one or more housemate of the Sewage with one or more housemate from the Big Brother House. He replaced himself and Ori from the Sewage with Nataly and Hisham from Big Brother House. Later, the task is over, all Sewage housemates were moved to the Big Brother House.
