= Eurovision Song Contest 1986 =

International song competition

Date and venue
- Final: 3 May 1986
- Venue: Grieghallen; Bergen, Norway

Organisation
- Organiser: European Broadcasting Union (EBU)
- Scrutineer: Frank Naef

Production
- Host broadcaster: Norsk rikskringkasting (NRK)
- Director: John Andreassen
- Executive producer: Harald Tusberg
- Musical director: Egil Monn-Iversen
- Presenter: Åse Kleveland

Participants
- Number of entries: 20
- Debuting countries: Iceland
- Returning countries: Netherlands; Yugoslavia
- Non-returning countries: Greece; Italy
- Participation map: Competing countries Countries that participated in the past but not in 1986

Vote
- Voting system: Each country awarded 12, 10, 8-1 point(s) to their 10 favourite songs
- Winning song: Belgium "J'aime la vie"

The Eurovision Song Contest 1986 was the 31st edition of the Eurovision Song Contest, held on 3 May 1986 at Grieghallen in Bergen, Norway, and presented by Åse Kleveland. It was organised by the European Broadcasting Union (EBU) and host broadcaster Norsk rikskringkasting (NRK), who staged the event after winning the 1985 contest for Norway with the song "La det swinge" by Bobbysocks!. Kleveland had also represented Norway in 1966.

Broadcasters from twenty countries participated in the contest, with Greece and Italy deciding not to enter, Yugoslavia and Netherlands returning, and Iceland competing for the first time. Turkey achieved their best result in the contest up to this point.

The winner was Belgium with the song "J'aime la vie" by Sandra Kim. Belgium was the last of the original 7 countries that had competed in the first contest to win. Aged 13, Kim was the youngest ever Eurovision winner. Current rules require Eurovision Song Contest participants to be at least 16, so unless the rule is changed, Kim's record will never be broken. The lyrics of her song implied that Kim was 15 years of age, but after the contest, it was revealed that she was actually 13. Switzerland, who finished second, appealed for her to be disqualified, but was not successful.

The 1986 contest was a first for Eurovision in that royalty were among the guests—Crown Prince Harald, Crown Princess Sonja, Princess Märtha Louise, and Prince Haakon Magnus were all in attendance.

== Background ==
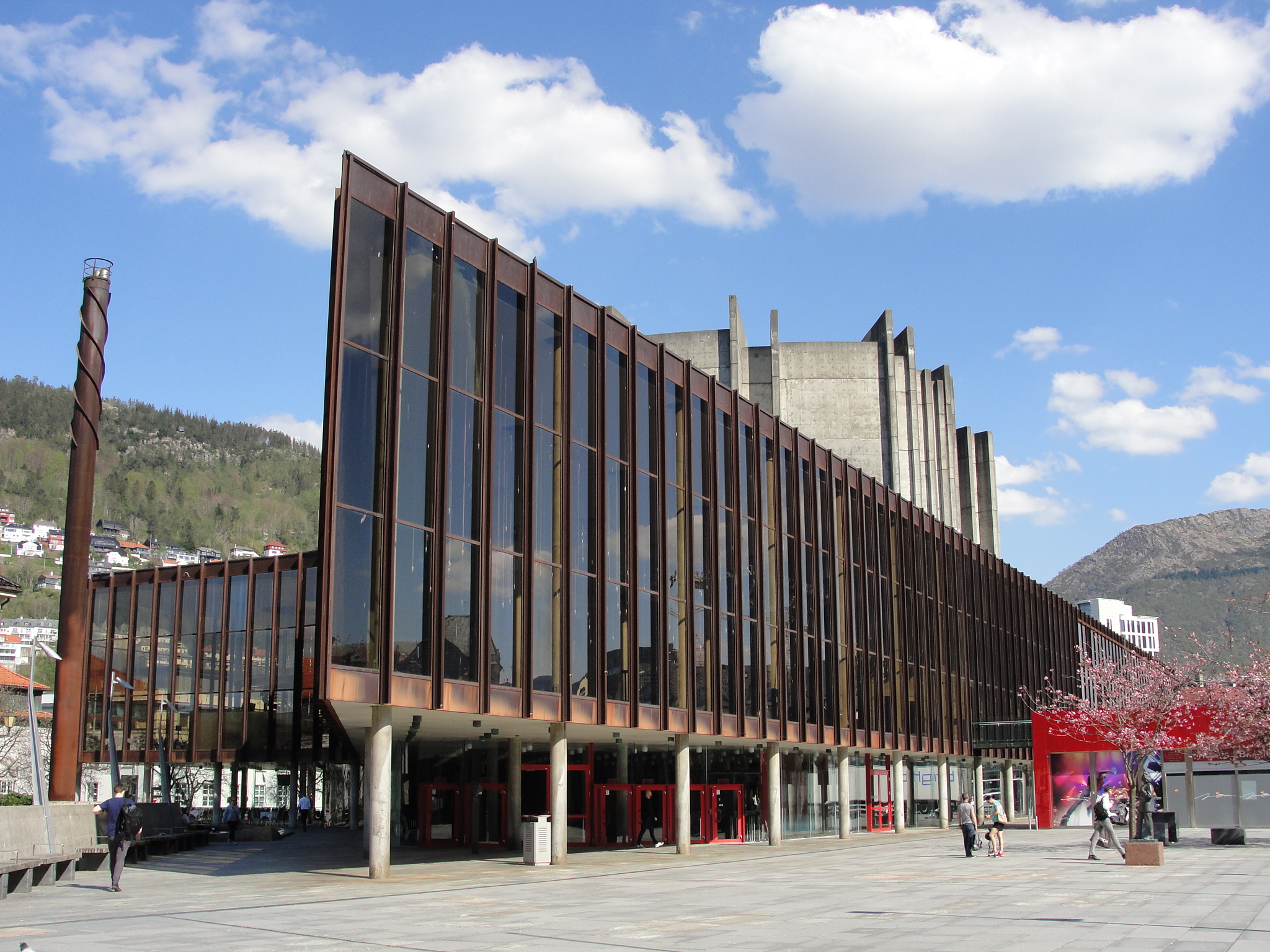
Grieghallen, Bergen – host venue of the 1986 contest.

By 1985, Norway had received the unwanted distinction of being "the nul points country", receiving 0 points three times and coming in last six times. When they finally won the 1985 contest, it was a source of pride among the Norwegian population, and Norsk rikskringkasting (NRK) took full advantage of being able to showcase Norway and its achievements in front of over 500 million television viewers. By the autumn of 1985, NRK had decided to hold the next year's contest at the Grieghallen in Bergen, turning down other bids from capital Oslo, and main cities of Stavanger, Sandnes, and Trondheim. Bergen is the northernmost city to have ever hosted the Eurovision Song Contest. About 450 journalists covered the event.

As this was the first time a Eurovision Song Contest was hosted in Norway, NRK commissioned a lavish budget for the event, turning Grieghallen into a Viking-esque "ice palace" for the live show, complete with white and pastel neon lights for the stage. In addition, NRK had a special diamond-encrusted dress made for presenter Åse Kleveland for her opening number. The prized dress, which weighed upwards of 15 pounds (6.8 kg), is still available for viewing at NRK's costuming department at Marienlyst in Oslo.

Åse Kleveland, a well-known music and celebrity at the host country, also was President of the Norwegian Association of Musicians at the time and had represented Norway in 1966 at Eurovision, sang the multilingual "Welcome to Music" as the opening act, incorporating English and French primarily, in addition to other European languages. BBC commentator Terry Wogan, at the close of Kleveland's number, dryly remarked, "Katie Boyle (a former Eurovision host for the UK) never sang, did she?"

During her opening remarks, Kleveland said of Norway's road in the contest, "For those of you who have followed Norway's course through the history of the Eurovision Song Contest, you will know that it has been quite thorny, in fact. So, imagine our joy when last year we finally won, and the pleasure we feel today, being able to welcome 700 million viewers to the top of Europe, to Norway, and to Bergen."

The intersong videos introducing each participant, traditionally named 'postcards' were for the only time, represented as actual picture postcards sent from the artists to your own nation. Each video began with clips of various scenic views of a part of Norway, which then 'flipped' to reveal a message of greeting, written in the language of the upcoming song, alongside details of the title, author and composer. The postage stamp on each card (a representation of a genuine Norwegian postage stamp) was linked to the theme of the video content. The postcard then 'flipped' back to the picture side, where the performing artist had been superimposed onto the image. After the video, Åse Kleveland gave details of the entry and introduced the conductors in a mix of English and French, reading from cards represented by the flag of the upcoming country.

The main interval act presented featured two Norwegian musicians: one was the previously unknown outside Norway 16 year-old Sissel Kyrkjebø and the musician Steinar Ofsdal, accompanied by the NRK radio orchestra, Kringkastingsorkesteret (KORK). They opened with the traditional song of the city of Bergen, Udsikter fra Ulriken (also known as "Nystemte'n"), and presented a number of familiar tunes while showing the sights and sounds of Bergen area. Ofsdal played a range of traditional Norwegian folk instruments such as accordion, recorder, and hardingfele. This was Kyrkjebø's first performance on an international event, which served as the starting point for a consolidated international career years later.

== Participants ==
Eurovision Song Contest 1986 – Participation summaries by country
- Austria; Belgium; Cyprus; Denmark; Finland; France; Germany; ~~Greece~~; Iceland; Ireland; Israel; Luxembourg; Netherlands; Norway; Portugal; Spain; Sweden; Switzerland; Turkey; United Kingdom; Yugoslavia

A record number of broadcasters submitted entries for the contest, and it was expected that twenty-two countries would participate in the event. This would have surpassed the previous record of twenty participating countries which competed in 1978, 1981, and 1983. The Netherlands and Yugoslavia both returned after a one-year absence, and Iceland made its first ever entry. Of the countries which had participated in the previous year's event only Italy opted not to compete in this event. However, only twenty countries ultimately participated, as the Hellenic Broadcasting Corporation (ERT), which had already selected the song "Wagon-lit" performed by Polina to represent Greece, made a late decision to not compete due to the event falling on Holy Saturday in the Eastern Orthodox calendar.

The contest featured one artist who had previously competed at Eurovision: Elpida representing Cyprus had previously represented Greece in 1979.

Eurovision Song Contest 1986 participants
Country	Broadcaster	Artist	Song	Language	Songwriter(s)	Conductor
Austria	ORF	Timna Brauer	"Die Zeit ist einsam"	German	Peter Cornelius; Peter Janda	Richard Oesterreicher
Belgium	RTBF	Sandra Kim	"J'aime la vie"	French	Angelo Crisci; Jean-Pierre Furnémont; Rosario Marino	Jo Carlier
Cyprus	CyBC	Elpida	"Tora zo" (Τώρα ζω)	Greek	Phivos Gavris; Peter Yiannaki	Martyn Ford
Denmark	DR	Lise Haavik	"Du er fuld af løgn"	Danish	John Hatting	Egil Monn-Iversen
Finland	YLE	Kari	"Never the End"	Finnish	Kari Kuivalainen	Ossi Runne
France	Antenne 2	Cocktail Chic	"Européennes"	French	Georges Costa; Michel Costa	Jean-Claude Petit
Germany	BR (Note: On behalf of the German public broadcasting consortium ARD)	Ingrid Peters	"Über die Brücke geh'n"	German	Hans Blum	Hans Blum
Iceland	RÚV	ICY	"Gleðibankinn"	Icelandic	Magnús Eiríksson	Gunnar Þórðarson
Ireland	RTÉ	Luv Bug	"You Can Count On Me"	English	Kevin Sheerin	Noel Kelehan
Israel	IBA	Moti Giladi and Sarai Tzuriel	"Yavo Yom" (יבוא יום)	Hebrew	Moti Giladi; Yoram Tzadok	Yoram Tzadok
Luxembourg	CLT	Sherisse Laurence	"L'Amour de ma vie"	French	Frank Dostal; Alain Garcia; Rolf Soja	Rolf Soja
Netherlands	NOS	Frizzle Sizzle	"Alles heeft ritme"	Dutch	Rob ten Bokum; Peter Schön	Harry van Hoof
Norway	NRK	Ketil Stokkan	"Romeo"	Norwegian	Ketil Stokkan	Egil Monn-Iversen
Portugal	RTP	Dora	"Não sejas mau p'ra mim"	Portuguese	Guilherme Inês; Luís Oliveira; Zé da Ponte	Colin Frechter
Spain	TVE	Cadillac	"Valentino"	Spanish	José María Guzmán	Eduardo Leiva
Sweden	SVT	Lasse Holm and Monica Törnell	"E' de' det här du kallar kärlek"	Swedish	Lasse Holm	Anders Berglund
Switzerland	SRG SSR	Daniela Simons	"Pas pour moi"	French	Nella Martinetti; Atilla Şereftuğ	Atilla Şereftuğ
Turkey	TRT	Klips ve Onlar	"Halley"	Turkish	İlhan İrem; Melih Kibar	Melih Kibar
United Kingdom	BBC	Ryder	"Runner in the Night"	English	Maureen Darbyshire; Brian Wade	No conductor
Yugoslavia	JRT	Doris Dragović	"Željo moja" (Жељо моја)	Serbo-Croatian	Zrinko Tutić	Nikica Kalogjera

== Production and format ==
About 450 journalists covered the event. The trophy was made by Arne Valen at the Bergen Steinsenter.

== Contest overview ==
The contest took place at 21:00 CEST, and was hosted by Åse Kleveland, who had represented Norway in 1966.

Results of the Eurovision Song Contest 1986
R/O	Country	Artist	Song	Points	Place
1	Luxembourg	Sherisse Laurence	"L'Amour de ma vie"	117	3
2	Yugoslavia	Doris Dragović	"Željo moja"	49	11
3	France	Cocktail Chic	"Européennes"	13	17
4	Norway	Ketil Stokkan	"Romeo"	44	12
5	United Kingdom	Ryder	"Runner in the Night"	72	7
6	Iceland	ICY	"Gleðibankinn"	19	16
7	Netherlands	Frizzle Sizzle	"Alles heeft ritme"	40	13
8	Turkey	Klips ve Onlar	"Halley"	53	9
9	Spain	Cadillac	"Valentino"	51	10
10	Switzerland	Daniela Simons	"Pas pour moi"	140	2
11	Israel	Moti Giladi and Sarai Tzuriel	"Yavo Yom"	7	19
12	Ireland	Luv Bug	"You Can Count On Me"	96	4
13	Belgium	Sandra Kim	"J'aime la vie"	176	1
14	Germany	Ingrid Peters	"Über die Brücke geh'n"	62	8
15	Cyprus	Elpida	"Tora zo"	4	20
16	Austria	Timna Brauer	"Die Zeit ist einsam"	12	18
17	Sweden	Lasse Holm and Monica Törnell	"E' de' det här du kallar kärlek"	78	5
18	Denmark	Lise Haavik	"Du er fuld af løgn"	77	6
19	Finland	Kari	"Never the End"	22	15
20	Portugal	Dora	"Não sejas mau p'ra mim"	28	14

=== Spokespersons ===
Each participating broadcaster appointed a spokesperson who was responsible for announcing the votes for their respective country via telephone. Known spokespersons at the 1986 contest are listed below.

- Finland – Solveig Herlin
- Iceland – Guðrún Skúladóttir
- Sweden – Agneta Bolme Börjefors
- United Kingdom – Colin Berry

== Detailed voting results ==
The winning song, Belgium's "J'aime la vie", received points from every jury (Belgium received five sets of 12 points; every country awarded Belgium at least five points except for Germany, which gave them just one point). Belgium was the leader in the voting from the results of the second jury out of twenty, in the longest winning stretch during voting since 1974. Switzerland was behind Belgium in nearly every part of the voting, but Belgium had a commanding lead from the very beginning. Traditionally some juries give high points to the host country's entrant, but this did not happen this year; no jury gave Norway's song "Romeo" more than six points out of a possible 12.

Belgium scored an absolute record at the time, with Sandra Kim earning a never seen before number of 176 points (that record remained seven years until the 1993 contest, with Ireland scoring 187 points), an average of 9.26 points per voting nation. Kim received 77.2% of the maximum possible score, which, as of 2026, still ranks 8th among all Eurovision winners.

Detailed voting results
		Total score	Luxembourg	Yugoslavia	France	Norway	United Kingdom	Iceland	Netherlands	Turkey	Spain	Switzerland	Israel	Ireland	Belgium	Germany	Cyprus	Austria	Sweden	Denmark	Finland	Portugal
Contestants	Luxembourg	117		5	8	12	8	1	8			2	4	7	10	12	8	10	10	2	4	6
Contestants	Yugoslavia	49	2				7	5	7	3	3		1	3	4		12	1	1			
Contestants	France	13				3						7							3			
Contestants	Norway	44			4			4	2			6		6	5	6	6			5		
Contestants	United Kingdom	72	4		10	6				6	2	4	2			5	2	3	8	8	10	2
Contestants	Iceland	19							5	2	6						4		2			
Contestants	Netherlands	40	1	2						7	1		8			10	1				3	7
Contestants	Turkey	53	6	12			2		6			8	3		6	8		2				
Contestants	Spain	51	7	4	6		1	2		8		1		5	3			7		3	1	3
Contestants	Switzerland	140	12	6	7	5	5	3	12	10	4		12	10	12		5	4	12	4	7	10
Contestants	Israel	7			1	1						5										
Contestants	Ireland	96	3	8	3	2		8		5	12		6		2			12	7	12	8	8
Contestants	Belgium	176	10	10	12	8	10	10	10	12	10	10	5	12		1	10	6	6	10	12	12
Contestants	Germany	62	8	1			12							8	7			8	5	7	2	4
Contestants	Cyprus	4		3										1								
Contestants	Austria	12												2	1	2					6	1
Contestants	Sweden	78	5	7	2	7	3	12	3		7	12				4		5		6	5	
Contestants	Denmark	77			5	10	6	7	4		5	3	10	4		7	7		4			5
Contestants	Finland	22						6	1	1					8	3	3					
Contestants	Portugal	28				4	4			4	8		7							1		

=== 12 points ===
Below is a summary of all 12 points in the final:

N.	Contestant	Nation(s) giving 12 points
5	Belgium	Finland, France, Ireland, Portugal, Turkey
5	Switzerland	Belgium, Israel, Luxembourg, Netherlands, Sweden
3	Ireland	Austria, Denmark, Spain
2	Luxembourg	Germany, Norway
2	Sweden	Iceland, Switzerland
1	Germany	United Kingdom
1	Turkey	Yugoslavia
1	Yugoslavia	Cyprus

== Broadcasts ==
Each participating broadcaster was required to relay the contest via its networks. Non-participating EBU member broadcasters were also able to relay the contest as "passive participants". Broadcasters were able to send commentators to provide coverage of the contest in their own native language and to relay information about the artists and songs to their television viewers.

The contest was reportedly broadcast in Greece and Jordan; in Bulgaria, Czechoslovakia, Hungary, Poland, Romania, and the Soviet Union via Intervision; and in Australia, Gibraltar, and South Korea, with an estimated maximum audience of 600 million viewers and listeners. 44 television and radio stations have reportedly broadcast the contest. Known details on the broadcasts in each country, including the specific broadcasting stations and commentators are shown in the tables below.

Broadcasters and commentators in participating countries
Country	Broadcaster	Channel(s)	Commentator(s)	Ref.
Austria	ORF	FS1	Ernst Grissemann	
Belgium	RTBF	RTBF1, Télé 2	Patrick Duhamel	
Belgium	BRT	TV1	Luc Appermont	
Belgium	BRT	BRT 2	Julien Put	
Cyprus	CyBC	RIK		
Denmark	DR	DR TV	Jørgen de Mylius	
Finland	YLE	TV1	Kari Lumikero	
Finland	YLE	2-verkko		
France	Antenne 2		Patrice Laffont	
France	RFO	Second canal de RFO (Note: Delayed broadcast in Martinique on 3 July 1986 at 20:00 (AST))		
Germany	ARD	Erstes Deutsches Fernsehen	Ado Schlier	
Iceland	RÚV	Sjónvarpið, Rás 1	Þorgeir Ástvaldsson	
Ireland	RTÉ	RTÉ 1	Brendan Balfe	
Ireland	RTÉ	RTÉ Radio 1	Larry Gogan	
Israel	IBA	Israeli Television, Reshet Gimel		
Luxembourg	CLT	RTL Télévision		
Luxembourg	CLT	RTL plus	Matthias Krings	
Netherlands	Veronica	Nederland 1	Leo van der Goot	
Norway	NRK	NRK Fjernsynet, NRK P1, NRK P2	Knut Bjørnsen	
Portugal	RTP	RTP1		
Spain	TVE	TVE 2	Antonio Gómez Mateo	
Sweden	SVT	TV1	Ulf Elfving	
Sweden	RR	SR P3	Jacob Dahlin	
Switzerland	SRG SSR	TV DRS	Bernard Thurnheer	
Switzerland	SRG SSR	TSR (Note: Broadcast through a second audio programme on TSI)	Serge Moisson	
Switzerland	SRG SSR	TSI		
Turkey	TRT	TRT Televizyon	Gülgün Baysal	
United Kingdom	BBC	BBC1	Terry Wogan	
United Kingdom	BBC	BBC Radio 2 (Note: Simulcast on BBC Radio 1 VHF, BBC Radio Bristol, BBC Radio Cleveland, BBC Radio Cumbria, BBC Radio Derby, BBC Radio Devon, BBC Radio Humberside, BBC Radio Leeds, BBC Radio Merseyside, BBC Radio Newcastle, BBC Radio Shropshire, BBC Radio Solent. BBC Radio WM, and BBC Radio York.)	Ray Moore	
Yugoslavia	JRT	TV Beograd 1, TV Novi Sad, TV Sarajevo 1, TV Titograd 1, TV Zagreb 1	Ksenija Urličić	
Yugoslavia	JRT	TV Koper-Capodistria		
Yugoslavia	JRT	TV Ljubljana 1		
Yugoslavia	JRT	Val 202		
Yugoslavia	JRT	TV Prishtina		
Yugoslavia	JRT	TV Skopje 1		

Broadcasters and commentators in non-participating countries
Country	Broadcaster	Channel(s)	Commentator(s)	Ref.
Australia	SBS	SBS TV (Note: Deferred broadcast the following day at 19:30 (AEST))		
Czechoslovakia	ČST	II. program (Note: Delayed broadcast in a shortened format on 2 June 1986 at 17:15 (CEST))		
Greenland	KNR	KNR (Note: Delayed broadcast on 16 May 1986 at 21:10 (WGST))		
Hungary	MTV	MTV1		
Italy	Telepordenone			
Jordan	JRTV	JTV2		
Poland	TP	TP1 (Note: Delayed broadcast on 24 May 1986 at 20:00 (CEST))		
South Korea	KBS	1TV (Note: Delayed broadcast on 20 May 1986 at 21:45 (KST))		
Soviet Union	CT USSR	Programme One (Note: Delayed broadcast in a shortened format on 30 May 1986 at 22:15 (MSD))		
Soviet Union	ETV			

== Notes and references ==
=== Bibliography ===
- Murtomäki, Asko (2007). Finland 12 points! Suomen Euroviisut (in Finnish). Helsinki, Finland: Teos. ISBN 951-851-106-3.
- Roxburgh, Gordon (2016). Songs for Europe: The United Kingdom at the Eurovision Song Contest. Vol. Three: The 1980s. Prestatyn, United Kingdom: Telos Publishing. ISBN 978-1-84583-163-9.
- Thorsson, Leif; Verhage, Martin (2006). Melodifestivalen genom tiderna : de svenska uttagningarna och internationella finalerna [Melodifestivalen through the ages: the Swedish selections and international finals] (in Swedish). Stockholm, Sweden: Premium Publishing. ISBN 91-89136-29-2.
