= Ireland in the Eurovision Song Contest 1986 =

- Eurovision Song Contest 1986
- Participating broadcaster: Radio Telefís Éireann (RTÉ)
- Country: Ireland
- Selection process: National Song Contest
- Selection date: 30 March 1986

Competing entry
- Song: "You Can Count On Me"
- Artist: Luv Bug
- Songwriter: Kevin Sheerin

Placement
- Final result: 4th, 96 points

Participation chronology

Ireland was represented at the Eurovision Song Contest 1986 with the song "You Can Count On Me", written by Kevin Sheerin, and performed by the group Luv Bug. The Irish participating broadcaster, Radio Telefís Éireann (RTÉ), selected its entry through a national final.

== Before Eurovision ==
=== National Song Contest ===
Radio Telefís Éireann (RTÉ) held the twenty-first edition of the National Song Contest on 30 March 1986 at its studios in Dublin, hosted by Mike Murphy. Eleven regional juries across Ireland selected the winning song, "You Can Count On Me", performed by the group Luv Bug and composed by Kevin Sheerin.

R/O	Artist	Song	Points	Place
1	Fran Meen	"Here in the Night"	12	5
2	Luv Bug	"You Can Count On Me"	35	1
3	Theresa Lowe	"Only the Lonely Survive"	2	8
4	The Rockets	"Life in the City"	3	6
5	John Spillane and Mandy Murphy	"Ringo"	3	6
6	Honor Heffernan	"Honey"	19	3
7	Loudest Whisper	"Johnny, Where Are You Now?"	22	2
8	Linda Martin	"If I Can Change Your Mind"	14	4
9	Jim Walsh	"I'll Never Love Again"	0	9

Detailed Regional Jury Votes
R/O	Song	Dublin County	Dundalk	Manorhamilton	Gweedore	Clifden	Dingle	Cobh	Kilkenny	Rosslare	Mullingar	Dublin Central	Total
1	"Here in the Night"		1			2			1	6	1	1	12
2	"You Can Count On Me"			7	4	7	7	2		3	4	1	35
3	"Only the Lonely Survive"								1		1		2
4	"Life in the City"	1									1	1	3
5	"Ringo"		2				1						3
6	"Honey"	4		2	2	1	1		2			7	19
7	"Johnny, Where Are You Now?"	2		1	2		1	8	5		3		22
8	"If I Can Change Your Mind"	3	7		2				1	1			14
9	"I'll Never Love Again"												0

== At Eurovision ==
Luv Bug performed twelfth on the night of the contest, following Israel and preceding Belgium. At the close of the voting the song had received 96 points, placing 4th in a field of 20 competing countries. This high placing was the third of five straight top ten finishes, and was the run-up to Ireland's win in Brussels the next year.

=== Voting ===
Points awarded to Ireland
Score	Country
12 points	Austria; Denmark; Spain
10 points	
8 points	Finland; Iceland; Portugal; Yugoslavia
7 points	Sweden
6 points	Israel
5 points	Turkey
4 points	
3 points	France; Luxembourg
2 points	Belgium; Norway
1 point	

Points awarded by Ireland
Score	Country
12 points	Belgium
10 points	Switzerland
8 points	Germany
7 points	Luxembourg
6 points	Norway
5 points	Spain
4 points	Denmark
3 points	Yugoslavia
2 points	Austria
1 point	Cyprus
