= Alex Holeh Ahavah =

1986 film by Boaz Davidson

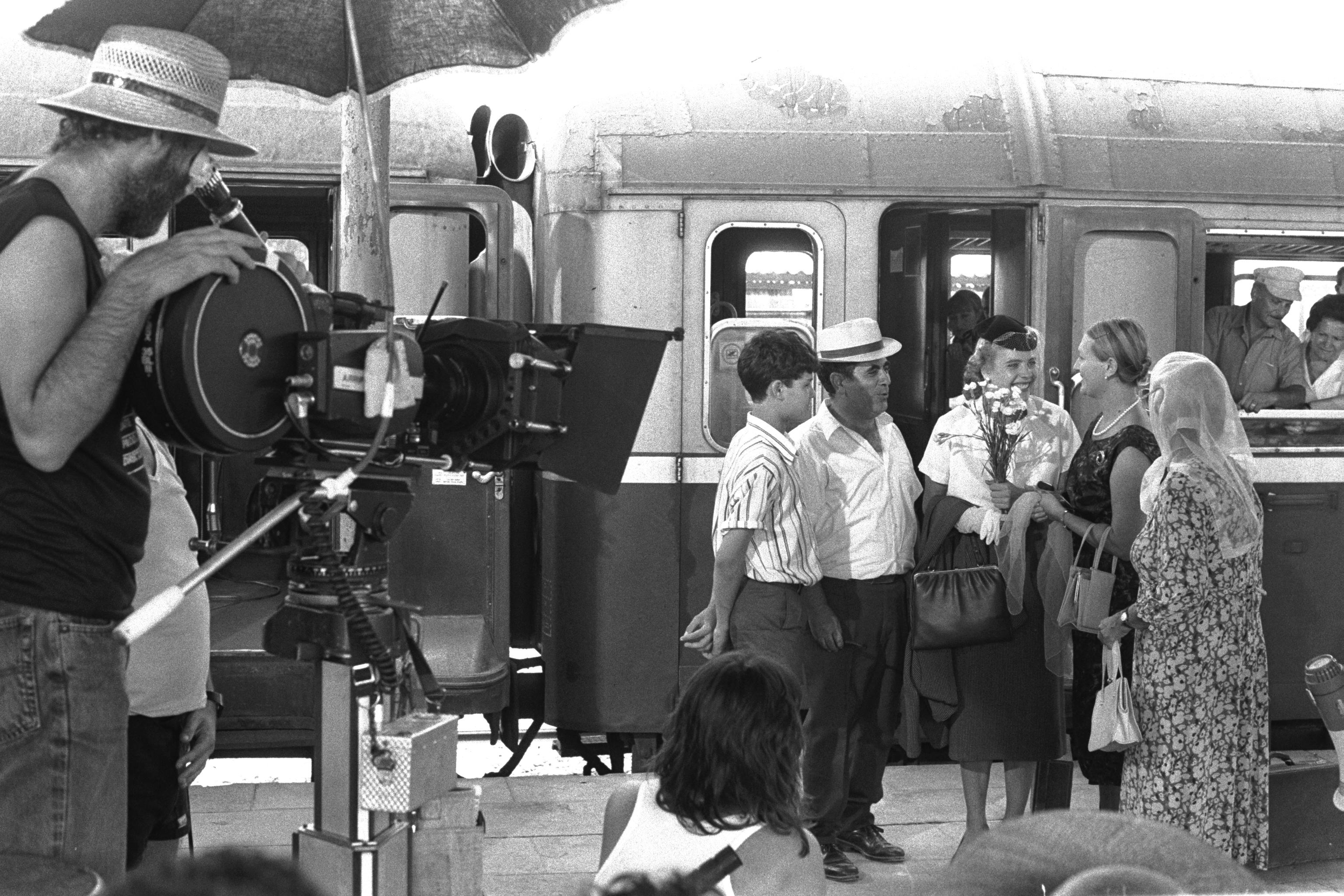
- director Boaz Davidson looks through a camera at the old railway station in Jerusalem during a scene from the film
- Directed by: Boaz Davidson
- Written by: Eli Tavor
- Produced by: Yitzhak Shani
- Starring: Eitan Anshel; Sharon Hacohen; Uri Kabiri; Avi Kushnir
- Cinematography: Eli Tavor
- Edited by: Bruria Davidson
- Release date: 1986
- Running time: 88 minutes
- Country: Israel
- Languages: Hebrew; Polish

Alex Holeh Ahavah (Hebrew: אלכס חולה אהבה, Alex Is Lovesick) is a 1986 Israeli film directed by Boaz Davidson. It stars Eitan Anshel, Sharon Hacohen, and Uri Kabiri. The film, set in the 1950s, features a boy (Anshel) as the main protagonist and his life as the son of Polish immigrants.

== Plot ==
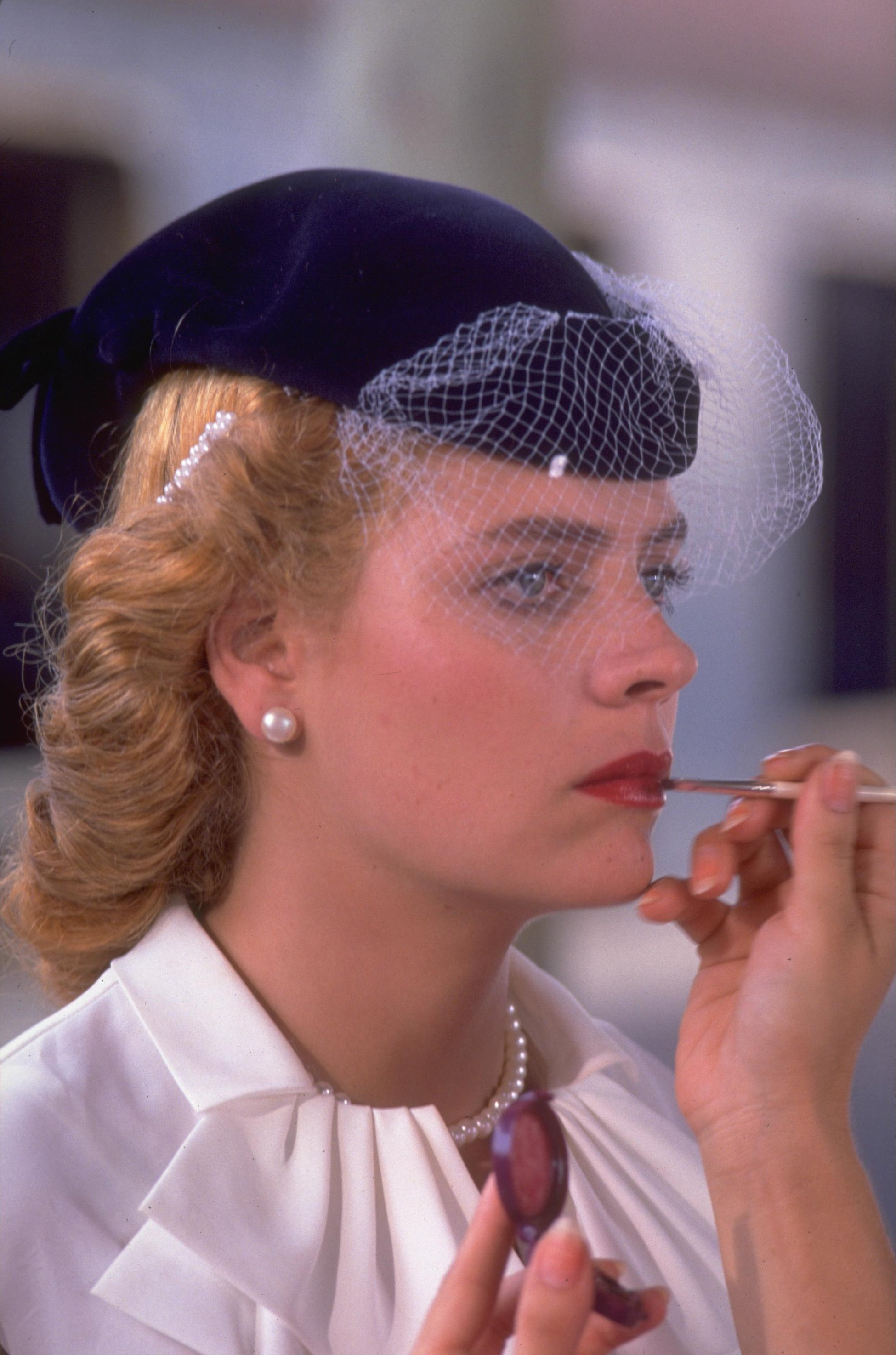
Hacohen in makeup for shooting Alex is Lovesick

The film is a romantic comedy that takes place in Israel during the austerity period of the 1950s. The main character is Alex, a 12-year-old boy who is about to turn 13 and attend his bar mitzvah.

Alex comes from a poor, dysfunctional family of Polish Jewish origin whose poverty requires them to share their apartment. Their tenant is Faruk, a man whose humorous battle against baldness is a running bit in the film.

At first, Alex falls in love with Mimi, the new girl in his class. Everything changes, however, when his aunt Lola arrives in Israel from Poland to search for a lost love with whom she once lived but who vanished after the Nazi invasion of Poland. Alex falls for his aunt and she responds by providing the soon-to-be 13-year-old with more than familial love.

The film authentically recreates the atmosphere of the country in the 1950s, known as the Austerity in Israel, including the black market, radio broadcasts concentrating on the search for lost relatives, music and pastimes of the 1950s and the era's clothing and dress styles.

== Production and Distribution ==
The film's production began in the summer of 1985, initiated by Boaz Davidson after his return to Israel from Hollywood, where he had spent six years working with the Cannon Group, led by Yoram Globus and Menahem Golan. Davidson aimed to create a nostalgic film inspired by his childhood days in Tel Aviv. After several weeks of casting attempts, he selected Sharon Cohen for the lead role despite her young age and lack of experience (she was a 20-year-old acting student, and this was her first film). Eitan Anshel was chosen from among 20 young men who auditioned, displaying a natural and unforced acting talent. The film's producers were Yitzhak (Izzo) Shani and Yosef Diamant, with a budget of $750,000. Filming took place during August–September 1985. A pre-premiere screening with the cast was held on June 20, 1986, and the film was released two weeks later. It achieved commercial success, with about 185,000 people viewing it within a month of its release.

== Cast ==
- Eitan Anshel as Alexander Koprobski
- Sharon Hacohen as Lola
- Uri Kabiri as Fishenzon
- Avi Kushnir as Motke, Shuki's brother
- Jupiter Leonid as Leonid the teacher
- Avraham Mor as Alex' Dad
- Alik Pelman as Shuki
- Shmuel Rodensky as Alex' Rabbi
- Hanna Roth as Alex' Mom (as Hanna Roth)
- Hinna Rozovska as Alexander's Grandmother
- Yosef Shiloach as Faruk
- Yael Wasserman as Mimi
