= Belgium in the Eurovision Song Contest 1985 =

- Eurovision Song Contest 1985
- Participating broadcaster: Belgische Radio- en Televisieomroep (BRT)
- Country: Belgium
- Selection process: Internal selection
- Announcement date: 1 April 1985

Competing entry
- Song: "Laat me nu gaan"
- Artist: Linda Lepomme
- Songwriters: Pieter Verlinden; Bert Vivier

Placement
- Final result: 19th, 7 points

Participation chronology

Belgium was represented at the Eurovision Song Contest 1985 with the song "Laat me nu gaan", composed by Pieter Verlinden, with lyrics by Bert Vivier, and performed by Linda Lepomme. The Belgian participating broadcaster, Flemish Belgische Radio- en Televisieomroep (BRT), internally selected its entry for the contest. BRT, unusually at the time, opted for internal selection rather than a public final. The selection process was fraught with problems before the last-minute announcement of singer and song was made.

== Before Eurovision ==
=== Internal selection ===
==== "Vannacht" ====
After the controversy following Eurosong 1983, Flemish broadcaster Belgische Radio- en Televisieomroep (BRT) wanted to keep a tight grip on the selection and it was decided in Autumn 1984 that the writing of a song should be entrusted to someone associated with the broadcaster. BRT planned to send a 'highly cultural' entry and selected classical composer Frédéric Devreese to compose a song which was intended to be sung by Mireille Capelle at the Eurovision Song Contest. BRT approved of the composition and then Devreese asked his friend Hugo Claus to provide lyrics to the song, which Claus had named "Vannacht". However, when Capelle brought the complete composition with lyrics written by Claus to the production manager for Light Music at BRT, Ward Bogaert, he was not impressed by the lyrics. BRT then invited several writers to provide alternative lyrics to Devreese's composition. Among the invited lyricists were Mary Boduin, and Bert Vivier, who titled his lyrics as "Ik was een kind". BRT approved Bert Vivier's lyrics as the official entry but Capelle and Devreese remained faithful to Claus's lyrics and "Vannacht". Eventually, Capelle and Devreese withdrew their participation.

==== "Laat me nu gaan" ====
Capelle and Devreese's withdrawal left BRT with relatively little time to find an alternative song and performer. BRT invited Pieter Verlinden to compose the music and Bert Vivier to write the lyrics. The new song was called "Laat me nu gaan". Verlinden asked singer/actress Linda Lepomme, who he had recently worked with, to perform the song. The song was presented to the press on 23 March 1985 and was presented publicly at the last minute by Luc Appermont, on 1 April 1985 at 21:10 (CET).

== At Eurovision ==
The contest was broadcast on TV1 (with commentary by Luc Appermont) and RTBF1 (with commentary by Jacques Mercier). It was also broadcast on radio station BRT 2.

On the night of the final Lepomme performed 8th in the running order, following Turkey and preceding Portugal. At the close of the voting "Laat me nu gaan" had received only 7 points, placing Belgium last of the 19 entries, the sixth time the country had finished the evening at the bottom of the scoreboard. The Belgian jury awarded its 12 points to contest winners Norway.

=== Voting ===
Points awarded to Belgium
Score	Country
12 points	
10 points	
8 points	
7 points	Turkey
6 points	
5 points	
4 points	
3 points	
2 points	
1 point	

Points awarded by Belgium
Score	Country
12 points	Norway
10 points	Germany
8 points	Ireland
7 points	Sweden
6 points	United Kingdom
5 points	Switzerland
4 points	Austria
3 points	Denmark
2 points	Italy
1 point	Turkey
