= Moti Giladi =

Israeli singer and actor (born 1946)

- מוטי גלעדי
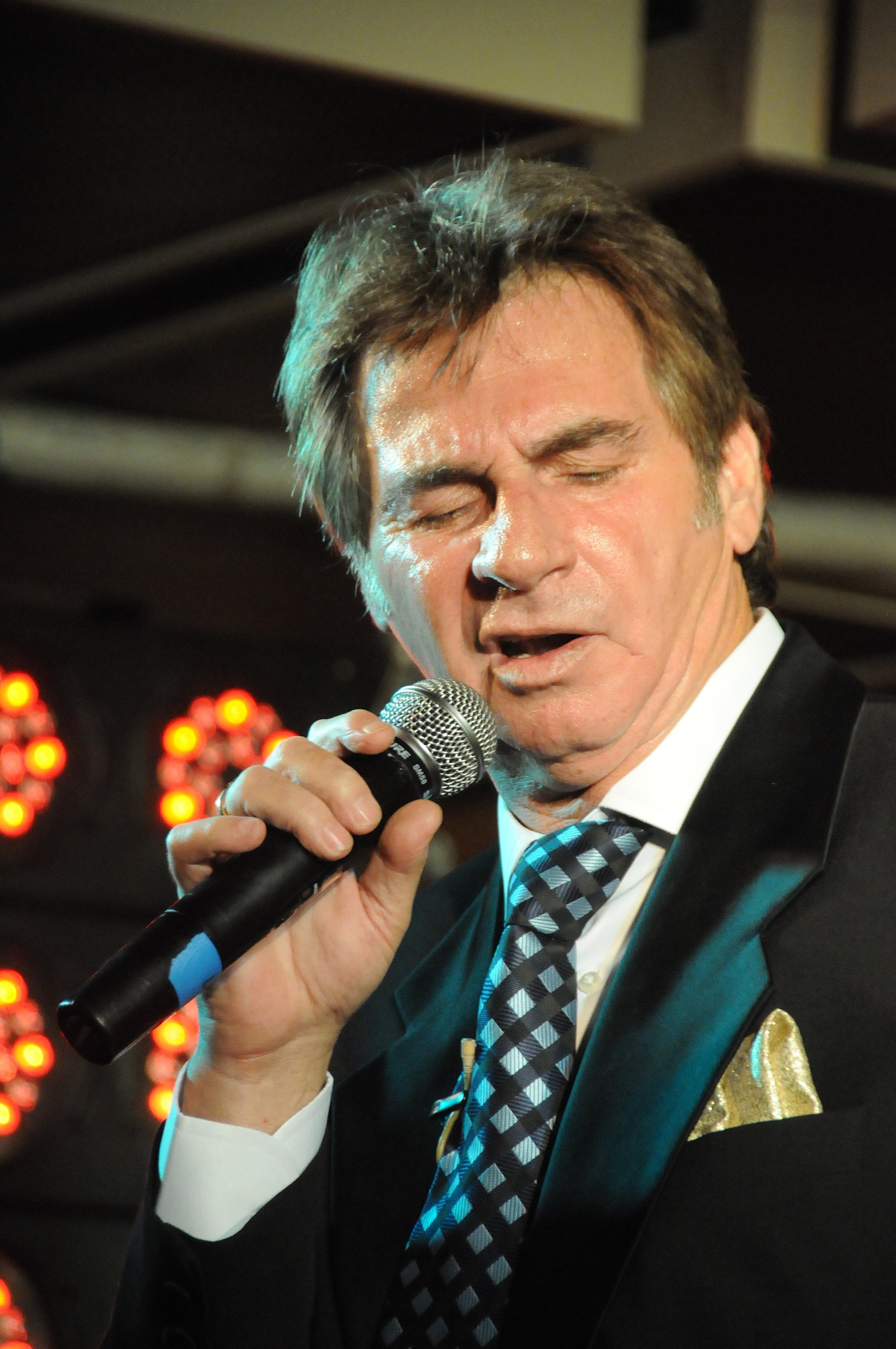
- Born: December 18, 1946 (age 79); Haifa, Mandatory Palestine
- Years active: 1969–present
- Title: Singer, actor

Mordechai "Moti" Giladi (Hebrew: מרדכי "מוטי" גלעדי; born December 18, 1946) is an Israeli singer and actor.

He released his first album in 1969 after he finished his military service. He lived in the United States of America in the seventies and was a cantor in a Jewish community.

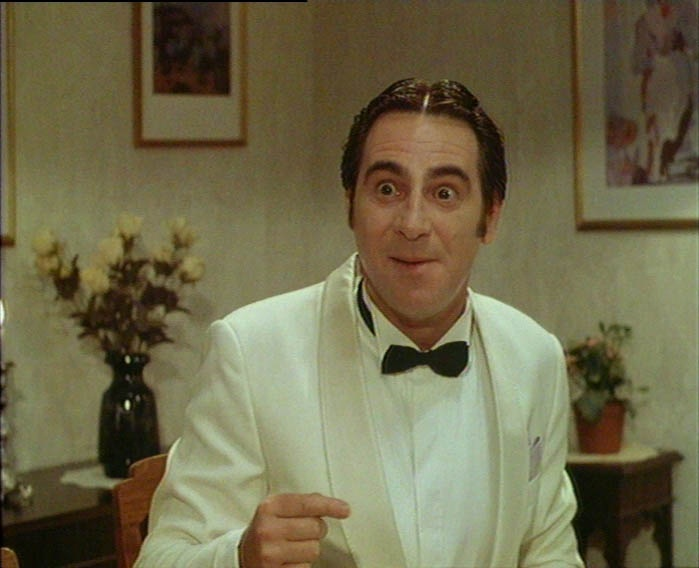
Moti Giladi in Jacob Goldwasser's 1991 film Beyond the Sea

He returned to Israel in the early eighties and, in 1986, joined Kdam Eurovision with Sarai Tzuriel. At the end of the contest, they won and were chosen to represent Israel in the Eurovision Song Contest 1986 held in Bergen, Norway and the duet finished in nineteenth place with 7 points.

Since the early nineties, Giladi has continued his career as an actor and also participated at Big Brother's second VIP season, eliminated only one week before the finale.

Awards and achievements
Preceded by Izhar Cohen with Olé, Olé	Israel in the Eurovision Song Contest; 1986	Succeeded by Datner and Kushnir (Lazy Bums) with Shir Habatlanim
