= Candan Erçetin discography =

This is the discography of Turkish pop singer Candan Erçetin. She has released 11 studio albums, 2 remix albums, 2 remix EP's and 9 singles.

== Albums ==
Year	Title	Sales and certifications
1995	Hazırım: Released: August 1995; Formats: MC, CD, digital download	Turkey sales: 400,000
1997	Çapkın: Released: June 1997; Formats: MC, CD, digital download	Turkey sales: 850,000
1999	Elbette: Released: November 1999; Formats: MC, CD, digital download	
2002	Neden: Released: June 2002; Formats: MC, CD, digital download	Mü-yap certification: Diamond
2003	Chante Hier Pour Aujourd'hui: Released: March 2003; Formats: MC, CD, digital download	
2004	Melek: Released: June 2004; Formats: MC, CD, digital download	Turkey sales: 440,000; Mü-yap certification:Diamond
2005	Aman Doktor: Released: 2005; Formats: MC, CD, digital download	Mü-yap certification:Gold
2009	Kırık Kalpler Durağında: Released: December 16, 2009	
2011	Aranjman 2011: Released: July 7, 2011	Turkey sales: 59,998
2013	Milyonlarca Kuştuk...: Released: June 3, 2013	Turkey sales: 50,000
2015	Ah Bu Şarkıların Gözü Kör Olsun: Released: November 25, 2015	

== Remix EP's ==
Year	Title	Sales and certifications
1996	Sevdim Sevilmedim: Released: July 1996; Formats: MC	Turkey sales: 180,000
1998	Oyalama Artık: Released: September 1998; Formats: MC, CD	

== Remix albums ==
Year	Title	Sales and certifications
2003	Remix: Released: August 2003; Formats: MC, CD	
2005	Remix'5: Released: July 2005; Formats: MC, CD, digital download	

== Singles ==
- "Unut Sevme" (2001) - Limited edition single
- "Kim Korkar" (2018)
- "Değişiyoruz" (2018)
- "Bekle" (2018) - with Kardeş Türküler
- "Annem" (2019) (Remix of the song from Elbette, with additional verses, for the movie Annem)
- "İyi ki" (2020)
- "Teselli" (2021) (Remix of the song from Çapkın)
- "100. Yıl: İzmir Marşı" (2023)
- "100. Yıl: Gençlik Marşı" (2023)

== Guest appearances ==
Year	Song	Album
1989	"Gel", "İstemiyorum"	3. Altın Güvercin
2001	"Sevdan Olmasa"	Yadigar
2004	"Çember"	Söz Vermiş Şarkılar
2007	"Gelmiyorsun"	Çeyrek
2008	"Kim"	Söz Müzik Teoman
2010	"Bu Gece", "Rüya", "Tüm Bir Yaşam", "Sevdan Olmasa"; "Böyle mi Olmalıydı", "Gülme Kamşuna" (with Nükhet Duru); "Canım Benim", "Yabancı" (with Erol Evgin); "Neydi O Yıllar", "Etme Eyleme", "Yine de Güzeldir Yaşamak", "Söyle Canım", "Aldım Başımı Gidiyorum" (with Evgin & Duru)	Aldım Başımı Gidiyorum
2012	"Beni Böyle Sev"	Orhan Gencebay ile Bir Ömür
2012	"Uzun Kavak Ne Gidersin Engine"	167. Yılda Beklenen Türküler
2014	"Tamah"	Metin Altıok Şiirlerinden Şarkılar
2015	"Dağların Ardında Kuzum"	Musa Eroğlu ile Bir Asır
2015	"Büyük Aşkım"	Kayahan'ın En İyileri No.1
2015	"Ne Acı"	Elimden Tut Yoksa Düşeceğim (İlhan Helvacı album)
2016	"Susma (Bouree)"	Kaldığımız Yerden (Kürşat Başar album)
2016	"Aldım Başımı Gidiyorum" (with Erol Evgin)	Altın Düetler
2016	"Merhaba"	Livaneli 50. Yıl: Bir Kuşaktan Bir Kuşağa
2018	"Söyle Söyle Sever Mi"	Şarkı Gibi Şarkılar

=== Compilation albums ===
This list shows Candan Erçetin songs that are re-used in a compilation album.

Year	Song	Album
2000	"Kaybettik Biz"	Women's World Voices Vol. 2
2007	"Elbette (tango version)"	Isabella by Ricardo lemvo

== Other songs ==
Year	Song	Notes
1986	"Halley"	Represented Turkey in Eurovision Song Contest with Klips ve Onlar band.
1987	"Özlem" - Grup Onlar (Candan Erçetin, Sevingül Bahadır)	The song performed in "1987 Kuşadası Altın Güvercin Music Competition".
1989	"İstemiyorum"	The song performed in "1989 Kuşadası Altın Güvercin Music Competition".
1990	"Daha Kolay" (with Cihan Okan)	The song performed for Turkey's National Final of the Eurovision Song Contest 1990. It ranked fourth.
1991	"Hey Sen" - Grup 4 x 1 (Candan Erçetin, Erdal, Çiğdem Tunç & Mehmet Ali Erbil)	The song performed for Turkey's National Final of the Eurovision Song Contest 1991. It ranked seventh.
1991	"Sonbaharda Aşk"	The song performed in "1991 Istanbul Beyaz Güvercin Music Competition". The song came third in the contest.
1992	"Ben Seni İsterim" (with Sinan Erkoç)	The song performed for Turkey's National Final of the Eurovision Song Contest 1992. It ranked eighth.
2000	"Gerçek Dostluk"	Theme of a commercial made for a Turkish bank.
2003	"Özledim", "Yazık Oldu", "Biter mi?"	Gori vatra soundtrack
2008	"Ben Kimim"	Soundtrack of Gölgesizler movie, later included in her 2009 album Kırık Kalpler Durağında.
2019	"Annem"	Soundtrack of Annem movie
2020	"Sakın Bırakma"	Soundtrack of Sadan Hanım movie

== Soundtrack appearances ==
- "Özledim" and "Yazık Oldu" in Fuse (2003)
- "Propaganda Cues" in Propaganda (1999)
- "Ben Kimim" in Gölgesizler (2008)
- "Kaptan Feza" in "Kaptan Feza" (2009
- "Annem" in Annem (2019)
- "Sakın Bırakma in Sadan Hanım (2020)
