= Melek (album) =

Studio album by Candan Erçetin
- Released: 17 June 2004
- Genre: Pop
- Length: 61:09
- Label: Pasaj
- Producer: Rıza Erekli

Candan Erçetin chronology
Remix (2003)	Melek (2004)	Remix'5 (2005)

Melek (Angel) is the fifth studio album by Turkish singer Candan Erçetin. It was released on 17 June 2004 by Pasaj Müzik. It was Erçetin's first album released by this music company. The preparations for Melek began immediately after the release of Neden in May 2002. It is a pop album with six of its songs being written by Erçetin herself. The album was produced by Rıza Erekli.

Melek contains two classical Turkish songs, previously performed by Zeki Müren. It consists of 14 songs in total, and musician Ceza was featured on the eighth song "Şehir". The album's lead single "Melek", was released together with a music video. The second music video was made for the song "Meğer". Both of these videos were directed by the album's art director Bozkurt Bayer.

Candan Erçetin, who is known for producing her own works, received generally positive reviews from critics who stated that her music addressed a wide range of people. Melek ranked first on D&R's list of best-selling albums in Turkey and kept that position for five weeks. By selling 406,000 copies in 2004, it received a gold certification from MÜ-YAP. The remixed version of the album's songs were later released in her 2005 album Remix'5.

== Background and content ==
After the huge commercial success of her 2000 album Elbette, Erçetin stopped working with Mete Özgencil for her next studio album Neden (2002), and wrote and composed most of the songs by herself. For her 2003 album, Chante Hier Pour Aujourd'hui, she performed a number of French chansons and received positive reviews from the critics. Erçetin started working on her next studio album right after releasing Neden in May 2002. As with Çapkın (1997), Elbette and Neden, the recordings for the album were done at the Erekli & Tunç studio. At the end, 14 songs were produced for the new album. On 17 June 2004, Erçetin's fifth studio album Melek was released by Pasaj Müzik "from an excited huge team for those who love each other, love new works, and love music." This was her first album published by Pasaj Müzik, after she ended her contract with Topkapı Müzik.

Produced by Rıza Erekli, the album contained 11 new songs (for this album 25 different songs were prepared, out of which 11 were chosen), 2 cover songs ("Bir Yangının Külünü" and "Gökyüzünde Yalnız Gezen Yıldızlar" originally performed by Zeki Müren) and 1 different version of one of the album's main 11 songs. Six of the songs on Melek were written solely by Candan Erçetin, and composed by her. Aylin Atalay, with whom she had worked on her previous albums, wrote two songs for Erçetin's new album, "Bahane" and "Yaşıyorum", despite being busy with studying English language and literature. Cihan Güçlü, a conservatory student who joined the album team to gain studio experience, helped with composing the song "Şehir". In her desire to make a song about the city she was born in, Erçetin chose to perform a hip hop song and she decided to collaborate with the "modern singer" Ceza on it. After the song was prepared, Erçetin made it known that she wanted Ceza to be featured on the song as well. Ceza later talked about the experience:

"The idea was actually brought forward by Candan Erçetin. It was a dream of mine, but I had not succeeded in contacting her. She had released a song in 1998, with the lyrics 'Everything is a lie in the world, except death'. My mother was diagnosed with cancer during that period. The song affected me on an emotional level. I started to love her from that moment. It was both her music and the spirit and quality in it that made me want to work with her, out of all the artists who make music with different styles in Turkey. One night before the day she called me, I was thinking about Candan Erçetin's songs. The next day I received the phone call. What I wanted with my heart had now happened. [...] I accepted [the offer] without thinking. [...] I sat at my home, brought a book and pen, and wrote the first part. Then we went to the studio. Ms. Candan said 'That's a little bit short. I'd be glad if you make it longer'. I sat down again and wrote the last part in the studio. It took me no more than half an hour."

Melek entered D&R's list of best-selling albums on 27 June 2004 and topped the chart. It continued to keep that position on the weeks of 4 July, 11 July, 18 July and 25 July. On 1 August 2004, with the release of Mustafa Sandal's İste (2004) and Hande Yener's Aşk Kadın Ruhundan Anlamıyor (2004), the album went down to number three. By the end of the year, it continued to remain among the top 10, and on 19 December 2004 it ranked tenth on the list. The album stayed among the top 10 albums for about five months. According to MÜ-YAP, the album sold 406,000 copies in 2004, and as a result it received a gold certification. In 2005, the remixed versions of the songs "Bu Sabah", "Bir Yangının Külünü", "Gökyüzünde Yalnız Gezen Yıldızlar", "Melek", "Sonsuz" and "Şehir" were included in the album Remix'5 and released by Pasaj Müzik.

== Critical reception ==
Melek received positive reviews from music critics. Nokta's Cumhur Canbazoğlu described Erçetin as "one of the rare names that can produce works exclusive to themselves" and noted that just like her other albums that were released in the 2000s Erçetin had continued to produce her new work using the elements of Turkish pop music. He also stated that with Melek, the singer had addressed a wide range of listeners "from hip-hop to art music, from Balkan melodies to Western ballads with modern infrastructures." Radioman Michael Kuyucu believed that Melek had more potential to become a hit than the singer's previous album. He believed that in the album Erçetin portrays "a sad, sometimes desperate woman, and deals with desperation of a large part of the society, causing an uproar." In his opinion, the album's format was as if someone was talking to himself/herself and Melek was in fact the story of the lives of Erçetin's audience. Hürriyet' Tolga Akyıldız wrote that Candan Erçetin had not broken the consistency and professionalism of her posture since her first album. The "modern but simple arrangements with consistent and self-confident sounds" in the album caught his attention. He also stated that the album "was about a woman whose love pains are not over, and despite being abandoned and facing unfaithfulness, she had learned to stand on her own".

== Music videos ==
Erçetin had described the album's lead single "Melek" as "a cheerful song that sees life through pink glasses, doesn't feed us troubles, and helps us realize different angels in life". The first music video of the album was made for this song. It was directed by Bozkurt Bayer and recorded in Nişantaşı, Şişli. The video was released on 30 September 2004. Erçetin played in the video together with the baby İpek Işık, her cat Blanche, and her boyfriend of two months. Soykut Turan did the video's cinematography.

The second and final music video was released for "Meğer", the album's best song according to music critics. The video was recorded on 30 December 2004 at Ata Studios and it was directed by Bozkurt Bayer. Tolga Kutlar did its cinematography while Nalan Merter served as the director's assistant. In the video, Erçetin does not perform the song, and instead her facial expressions and mimics are used.

== Track listing ==
No.	Title	Writer(s)	Composer(s)	Length
1.	"Melek"	Candan Erçetin	Erçetin	3:49
2.	"Ağlıyor musun?"	Barlas Erinç · Erçetin	Erinç	3:55
3.	"Meğer"	Erçetin	Erçetin	4:37
4.	"Canı Sağolsun"	Erçetin	Saša Lošić	4:20
5.	"Sitem"	Erçetin	Erçetin	4:41
6.	"Bir Yangının Külünü" (v:1)	Şemsi Belli	Muzaffer İlkar	4:12
7.	"Bahane"	Aylin Atalay	Erçetin	3:00
8.	"Şehir" (duet with Ceza)	Erçetin · Ceza	Erçetin · Cihan Güçlü	4:14
9.	"Sensizlik"	Erçetin	Nuri Irmak	5:02
10.	"Yaşıyorum"	Atalay	Güçlü	4:11
11.	"Bu Sabah"	Erçetin	Erçetin	4:29
12.	"Sonsuz"	Sinan	Erçetin	4:11
13.	"Gökyüzünde Yalnız Gezen Yıldızlar"	Hikmet Münir Ebcioğlu	Ali Teoman Alpay	2:17
14.	"Bir Yangının Külünü"	Belli	İlkar	4:00
Total length:				61:09

Notes

- "Melek" includes samples from Giorgos Alkaios's song "Vgale To Karfi".
- "Ağlıyor musun?" includes samples from Red Hot Chili Peppers's song "Can't Stop" .
- "Canı Sağolsun" is a Turkish-language cover of "Iznad Tešnja zora sviće" by Jasna Žalica.
- "Şehir" includes samples from İlhan İrem's song "Çarpıntı".

== Personnel ==
- Pasaj Müzik – production
- Rıza Erekli – album producer
- Candan Erçetin – vocals, producer, songwriter, composer
- Alper Erinç – arrangement, accordion, bass, guitar, Pro Tools arrangement
- Aylin Atalay – songwriter
- Ceza – vocals, songwriter
- Hikmet Münir Ebcioğlu – songwriter
- Sinan – songwriter
- Barlas Erinç – songwriter, composition, arrangement
- Şemsi Belli – songwriter
- Ali Teoman Alpay – composition
- Muzaffer İlkar – composition
- Saša Lošić – composition
- Cihan Güçlü – arrangement, composition, guitar
- Nuri Irmak – composition, piano
- Sunay Özgür – arrangement
- Çağlar Yılmazkul – arrangement
- Hakkı Öztürk – cello
- Göksun Çavdar – clarinet, saxophone
- Hüsnü Şenlendirici – clarinet, trumpet
- Hamdi Akatay – goblet drum
- İlyas Tetik – violin
- Ahmet Kadri Rizeli – kemenche
- Ray Staff (Alchemy Mastering) – mastering
- Eyüp Hamiş – ney
- Hamdi Akatay – percussion
- Mehmet Akatay – percussion
- Tolga Görsev – recording, vocals, Turkish tambur
- Nihal Bilgen – recording assistant, co-producer, Pro Tools arrangement
- Erekli & Tunç – recording studio, mixing
- Erkut Gökgöz – trumpet
- Mustafa Süder – viola
- Kempa – bowed string instruments
- Bozkurt Bayer – art director
- Hakan Aydoğan – photography
- Hakan Köse – hair and make-up

Credits adapted from Melek's album booklet.

== Charts and certifications ==
=== Charts ===
Chart (2004)	Peak position
Turkey (D&R Best-Selling Albums)	1

=== Certifications ===
Country	Certification	Sales
Turkey (MÜ-YAP)	Gold	406,000

== Release history ==
Country	Date	Format	Label
Turkey	17 June 2004	CD · cassette · digital download	Pasaj Müzik
Worldwide	17 June 2004	Digital download	Pasaj Müzik
