= Erçetin =

Erçetin is a surname. Notable people with the surname include:

- Aykut Erçetin (born 1982), Turkish footballer
- Candan Erçetin (born 1963), Turkish singer and songwriter

== See also ==
- Candan Erçetin discography
- Remix (Candan Erçetin album), Candan Erçetin album
