= Hakan Karahan =

Turkish actor and writer (born 1960)

- Born: 1 January 1960 (age 66); Istanbul, Turkey
- Occupations: Novelist, poet, actor, film producer
- Spouse: Gamze Duruman (div.)
- Partner: Candan Erçetin
- Children: 1
- Writing career
- Pen name: Sinan
- Language: Turkish
- Website: www.hakankarahan.com.tr

Hakan Karahan (born 1 January 1960), also known with his pseudonym Sinan, is a Turkish writer and songwriter. He wrote several songs for Candan Erçetin and was producer for the movies Kaptan Feza and Gölgesizler.

== Books ==
- Yeni Başlayanlar İçin Aikido (1996, Alfa Yayınları, ISBN 9752977588)
- Ama Öyle! (2006, Alfa Yayınları, ISBN 9752977359)

Poems:

- Kafamdaki Ses (1998, Scala Yayıncılık, ISBN 978-975-8535-10-1)
- İntizar (2000, Scala Yayıncılık, ISBN 9757132632)

Novels:

- Sürüden Ayrı (2001, Alfa Yayınları, ISBN 9753168632)
- 19 (2004, Alfa Yayınları, ISBN 9752974708)
- Azrail (2005, Alfa Yayınları, ISBN 975297595X)
- Kıyamet Haritası (2007, Altın Kitaplar, ISBN 9752108636)
- Nehirde Kayan Yıldızlar (2012, Altın Kitaplar, ISBN 9752114180)
- Abluka (2014, Self published, ISBN 9786056487309)

== List of songs by Sinan ==
Title	English translation	music by	from
"Hayranım Sana"	I admire you	Akın Ertübey	Çapkın
"Onlar Yanlış Biliyor"	They know wrong	Candan Erçetin	Çapkın
"Teselli"	Consolation	Candan Erçetin	Çapkın
"Merak Ediyorum"	I wonder	Candan Erçetin	Elbette
"Anlatma Sakın"	Don't tell	Candan Erçetin	Neden
"Bensiz"	Without me	Neslihan Engin & Candan Erçetin	Neden
"Mühim Değil"	It's OK.	Neslihan Engin & Candan Erçetin	Neden
"Sonsuz"	Infinite	Candan Erçetin	Melek
"Nedense Sustum"	For some reason I didn't spoke	Candan Erçetin & Alper Erinç	Kırık Kalpler Durağında
"Sen"	You	Candan Erçetin & Alper Erinç & Nuri Irmak	Milyonlarca Kuştuk...

== Filmography ==
=== Television ===
Year	Title	Role
2006–2007	Sağır Oda	Oğuz
2013–2014	Kaçak	Taylan Karaman
2014	Zeytin Tepesi	Ragıp Dolunay
2015–2016	Eşkıya Dünyaya Hükümdar Olmaz	Özer Çetiner
2018	Aliya	–
2018–2019	Kadın	Nezir Korkmaz
2019–2020	Yasak Elma	Nadir Kılıç
2020–2021	Sen Çal Kapımı	Alexander Zucco
2022 & 2023	Ben Bu Cihana Sığmazam	Dumrul/Kayıkçı
2023	Shahmaran	Lakmu

=== Film ===
Year	Title	Role
2008	Gölgesizler	Bekçi
2009	Kaptan Feza	Ömer
2009	Yüreğine Sor	Yakup
2010	Ses	–
2012	Ateşin Düştüğü Yer	Osman
2013	Karaoğlan	Baybora
2014	Gece	Cemal
2015	Kasap Havası	Semih
2015	Senden Bana Kalan	Lawyer Hamdi
2017	Kervan 1915	–
2023	İlk Göktürk	
