= Candan Erçetin =

Turkish singer-songwriter (born 1963)

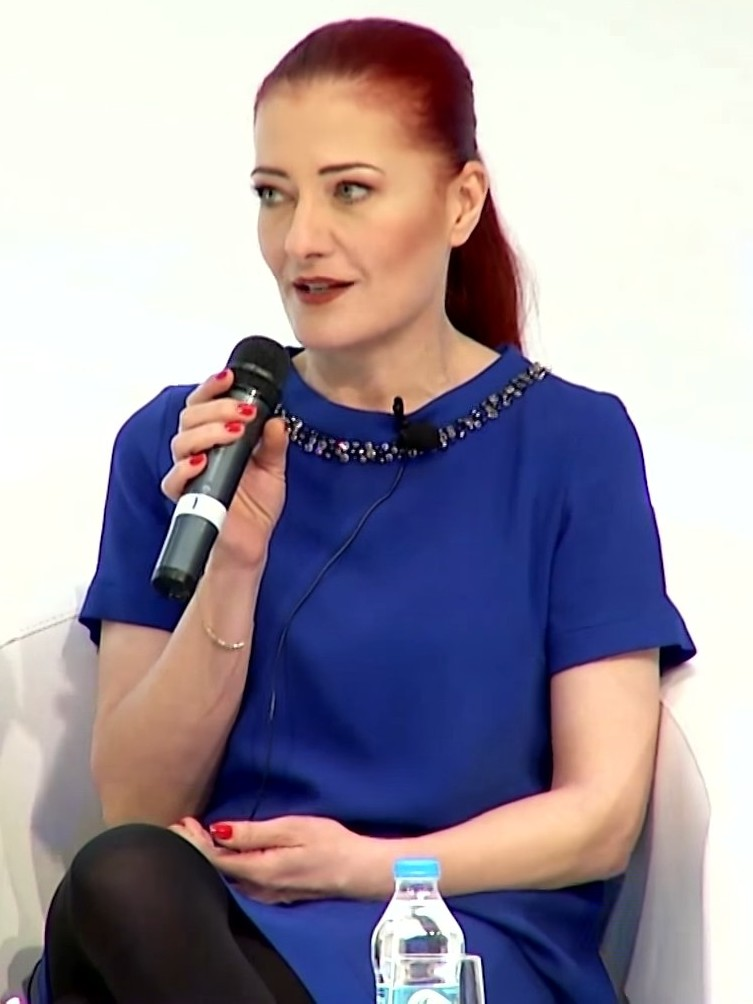
- Erçetin in 2015
- Born: 10 February 1961 (age 65); Lüleburgaz, Kırklareli, Turkey
- Education: Galatasaray High School; Istanbul University; University of Vienna
- Occupations: Singer-songwriter; record producer; teacher; actress
- Partner: Hakan Karahan
- Musical career
- Genre: Folk-pop
- Years active: 1986–present
- Labels: Topkapı; Pasaj; DMC
- Formerly of: Klips ve Onlar
- Website: www.candanercetin.com.tr

Candan Erçetin (pronounced ['dʒandan 'ertʃetin]; born 10 February 1961) is a Turkish singer-songwriter. Over the twenty five years of her singing career, she has been recognized for preparing and singing songs about human life. Despite the fact that she made her albums without much publicity, her work influenced other artists. Erçetin has released many music videos with different themes. Because her family originate from the Balkans, she has often used elements of Balkan music in her songs and works. In addition to Turkish, she has written songs in French and Greek.

Erçetin was born in Kırklareli, and is of Albanian and Macedonian descent. She later moved to Istanbul and attended Galatasaray High School. In the following years she received voice training. She later studied classical archeology at Istanbul University. In her final year at school, she recorded the song "Halley" and represented Turkey at the Eurovision Song Contest 1986 with the group Klips ve Onlar. However, she did not want to continue her musical career and kept studying archeology. In 1995, she released her debut album Hazırım, and in 1997 her song "Yalan" from the album Çapkın became a hit in Turkey. In 1999, she released her best-selling album Elbette, followed by the hit song "Gamsız Hayat" from the album Neden (2002). She subsequently released numerous other albums including Melek (2004), Kırık Kalpler Durağında (2009) and Milyonlarca Kuştuk... (2013). Alongside these works, she has released the albums Chante Hier Pour Aujourd'hui (2003) and Aranjman 2011 (2011), which include French songs, and the album Aman Doktor (2005) that features Greek songs.

Apart from her music career, Erçetin has been involved in various other projects. In 1994, she started working as a TV presenter, and in 2007 she produced her own program Candan Erçetin'le Beraber ve Solo Şarkılar. In 2005, she was cast in a leading role in the musical Yıldızların Altında. She also composed the musics for the movies Gölgesizler (2008) and Kaptan Feza (2009) and served as a producer as well. She had a stint teaching music at Galatasaray High School, and in 2009, she started to teach diction at Galatasaray University. On 25 June 2013, Ünal Aysal appointed Erçetin and Umit Özdemir as Vice Chairmen of Galatasaray S.K. For her contributions to France–Turkey relations, Erçetin was awarded with the Order of Arts and Letters by French President François Hollande in 2014. Throughout her career, she has won many awards and received various nominations.

== Life and career ==
=== 1961–94: Early life and career beginnings ===
Erçetin was born on 10 February 1961 in Kırklareli to a family with Albanian and Macedonian ancestry. She finished her early education in Kırklareli. At the age of 11, Erçetin won a scholarship and moved to Istanbul on her own to attend the Galatasaray High School. In 1978, she went to Istanbul Municipality Singing School and took singing lessons. In 1986, she represented Turkey at the Eurovision Song Contest together with the group Klips ve Onlar. They performed the song "Halley" and at the time got the best result Turkey had ever had in that competition. In 1990, she performed the song "Daha Kolay" together with Cihan Okan at the Eurovision Turkey finals, and in 1992 she again took part in the competition by performing the song "Kimbilir Nerdesin" with Sinan Erkoç. Erçetin married an Austrian archaeologist whom she met while studying archaeology in Vienna, but the marriage lasted only nine months.

=== 1995–99: Hazırım and Çapkın ===
Erçetin's first album, Hazırım was released in August 1995. The album, which consists of 12 songs, includes songs by famous artists such as Sezen Aksu, Yusuf Tümley, and mostly Gökhan Kırdar. The songs "Sevdim Sevilmedim" and "Umrumda Değil (Mix)" were included on the second version of the album. Separate music videos were made for the songs "Umrumda Değil", "Hangi Aşk Adil Ki", "Vakit Varken", "Daha", "Nar Çiçeği" and "Sevdim Sevilmedim" from the album.

The album Sevdim Sevilmedim, which was released in 1996, is Erçetin's first remix EP. In addition to six new songs, the remixed version of the songs "Umrumda Değil" and "Sevdim Sevilmedim" from her first album were featured on this album as well. Erçetin later started to release remix albums for all her future albums.

Her second studio album, Çapkın, was released on 17 June 1997. The album has 12 songs, and Mete Özgencil was the major artist who worked on this album with Erçetin. The 10th song from this album "Yalan" received a great deal of attention and was listened to by a large number of people. The songs "Yalan" and "Onlar Yanlış Biliyor" from this album were both awarded and Erçetin's music video for "Her Aşk Bitermiş" was chosen as the Best Video Clip. The songs "Yalan", "Çapkın", "Onlar Yanlış Biliyor" and "Her Aşk Bitermiş" from this album got their own music videos.

In August 1998, Erçetin's second remix EP album, Oyalama Artık, was released which included remixed version of the songs "Oyalama Artık", "Aşkı Ne Sandın", "Kaybettik Biz" and "Onlar Yanlış Biliyor". A new music video for "Oyalama Artık" was recorded as well.

=== 1999–03: Elbette, Neden and Chante Hier Pour Aujourd'hui ===
By March 1998, Erçetin stated that she had started to make plans for her next album and said: "We are looking for a new sound in the world by following where the music industry is going, but the outline will not change much. In short, it will consist of songs that I like." In August 1999, it was learned that the new album was intended to be released at the beginning of autumn and five songs were already recorded. Despite her efforts, the album was not released in 1999 and was released in 2000 instead. Erçetin's third studio album Elbette was released on 30 November 1999 by Topkapı Müzik. Mete Özgencil wrote the lyrics for eight of the songs. Erçetin herself composed six of the songs. She also rerecorded Güzide Kasacı's 1960 song "Unut Sevme" and included it on her album. Elbette was the best-selling album in Turkey for weeks. By the end of 2000, the album sold more than 1 million copies, becoming the best-selling of the year. Music critics had a positive reaction to the album, saying that the personality of the singer is integrated into her work and the audience travels with her into different worlds. Abdullah Kılıç from Zaman revealed "Dünya Durma" and "Unut Sevme" from the album as the most listened songs of 2000. In December 2009, Elbette was chosen as the Best Turkish Album of the 2000s by NTV's music judges.

In 2001, Erçetin, who was presenting the program Günlük Hayat on NTV, recorded the song "Sevdan Olmasa" for the album Yadigâr as a tribute to Melih Kibar. On 17 May 2002, her fourth studio album Neden was released by Topkapı Müzik together with a perfumed disc. With the release of this album, Mete Özgencil, who had collaborated with Erçetin since the album Hazırım, stopped working with her. Music critics found Neden different from the artist's previous works. The plain and simple lyrics of the song "Elbette" from her previous album was the dominant theme in this new album. Music videos were made for the album's hit lead single "Gamsız Hayat" as well as the song "Parçalandım". MÜ-YAP gave a certification to the album due to its successful performance on the sales charts. Remixed version of the songs from Neden were included in Erçetin's 2003 remix album. In 2003, she released the album Chante Hier Pour Aujourd'hui, which featured French songs with modern arrangements. She also appeared on the first episode of Show TV's series Hayat Bilgisi.

=== 2004–12: Melek, Aman Doktor, Kırık Kalpler Durağında and Aranjman 2011 ===
The preparations for Erçetin's fifth studio album Melek started immediately after the release of Neden. Twenty-five songs were prepared for this album, eleven of which were eventually included in the album. The album was released on 17 June 2004 by Pasaj Müzik. Melek was Erçetin's first album that was not produced by Topkapı Müzik but by a different production company. Musician Ceza was featured on the song "Şehir". According to the music critics the songs could be listened to by anyone form any group of the society and the album became the best-selling album in Turkey's D&R list of best-selling albums on 27 June 2004 and topped the charts for several weeks. The album sold 406,000 copies in 2004 and received a gold certification from MÜ-YAP. In the same year, Erçetin together with Beyazıt Öztürk, Ceza, Nev and Harem performed in 17 different cities for 23 days as a part of Fanta Youth Festival. In 2004, she was among the artists featured on the album Söz Vermiş Şarkılar in tribute to Murathan Mungan and performed the song "Çember". In July 2005, a remix version of Melek, titled Remix'5, was released by Pasaj Müzik.

In early 2005, she was cast in a leading role opposite Beyazıt Öztürk on the musical Yıldızların Altında, and later that year on 9 December her new album Aman Doktor was released by DMC. The album included Turkish-Greek cultural songs. One part of the album contains Turkish songs, while the other part features Greek songs. Aman Doktor topped the sales charts in Turkey and sold 105,000 copies in 2005 and 49,500 copies in 2006. As the album sold more than 100,000 copies, it received a gold certification from MÜ-YAP. In June 2006 Erçetin, appeared on the 68th episode of the TV series Yabancı Damat and sang at the wedding ceremony of the characters Eftelya and Memik. In 2007–08 she presented her own program Beraber ve Solo Şarkılar on TRT 1. Meanwhile she was featured on the albums of other artists and performed the songs "Gelmiyorsun" for the album Çeyrek (2007) and "Kim" for the album Söz Müzik Teoman (2008). In July–August 2007, she again went on a tour together with Beyazıt Öztürk for the Fanta Youth Festival and performed at 17 different concerts. In August 2007, she took part in the "Our Hearts Strike On The Street" project for animals and with the likes of Ajda Pekkan, Hande Yener, Sezen Aksu and Yaşar performed at a concert in Turkcell Kuruçeşme Arena.

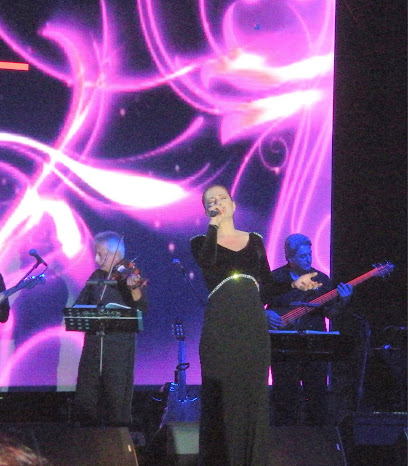
Erçetin performing live in June 2012

Erçetin served as the producer for the movie Gölgesizler, which was released in January 2009. The song, "Ben Kimim" which was prepared for the movie, was released in November 2008. The song remained on Billboard's Türkçe Top 20 for 15 weeks and ranked second on the list. The song was later included in her sixth studio album Kırık Kalpler Durağında. The album was released after "5 years, 5 months, and 27 days of silence" on 16 December 2009 by Pasaj Müzik. More than 100,000 copies of the album were ordered and it topped Turkey's D&R Best-Selling list. Erçetin rerecorded the late Esmeray's song "Unutama Beni" and included it in the album. The lyrics for the song "Gözler" featured parts of the poems by Neyzen Tevfik and Omar Khayyam. Music critics gave generally positive reviews for this album that came after Erçetin's hiatus; the singer's intellectual way was seen in this work as well and the compositions were praised too. The songs "Kader", "Kırık Kalpler Durağında" and "Git" (written by Cemal Safi) were the songs for which separate music videos were made. Out of these songs, "Kader" was featured on the movie Kaptan Feza's soundtrack in 2010. In 2011, she released her Turkish-French album Aranjman 2011, and in 2012 she was among the artists who were featured on Orhan Gencebay's album Orhan Gencebay ile Bir Ömür in honor of his sixty years of career and performed the song "Beni Böyle Sev".

=== 2013–present: Milyonlarca Kuştuk... and Ah Bu Şarkıların Gözü Kör Olsun ===
On 31 May 2013, Galatasaray S.K.'s president Ünal Aysal announced at the club-owned channel Galatasaray TV that Candan Erçetin was admitted to the sport club's newly formed board. She was appointed vice president of the club following the board elections at the extraordinary general assembly held on 22 June 2013. In July 2014 it was announced that she would be a board member of the club's basketball team for the next season.

Erçetin began the preparations for her seventh studio album in 2011, and after one year of producing and recording she released it quietly on 3 June 2013 with the title Milyonlarca Kuştuk.... Due to the Gezi Park protests, the album's promotions were postponed and the promotions were initially made only on the artist's website and the music company's website. The album's title and its lead single were inspired by the legend of Simurgh. For this album, Erçetin chose Nâzım Hikmet's poem "Bence Şimdi Sen De Herkes Gibisin" and turned it into a song. The album topped D&R's best-selling list and by the end of 2013 sold 50,000 copies, becoming Turkey's fifth best-selling album. With 54,790 downloads on the digital platforms, it became Turkey's tenth most downloaded album of the year.

In January 2014, Erçetin received the Order of Arts and Letters medal from the French President François Hollande for her contributions to France–Turkey relations. On 12 December 2014, she appeared on Beyazıt Öztürk's show Beyaz Show during which Öztürk showed a parody version of her song "Git". Erçetin later responded with another parody based on the same song and this turned into a comedy duet between the two artists. In the weeks during their battle of words Demet Akbağ, Derya Şensoy, Esra Erol, Gupse Özay and Saba Tümer appeared on one of Erçetin's parodies titled "women solidarity" to which Öztürk responded with another parody titled "men solidarity", featuring Ali İhsan Varol, Emre Karayel, Hayko Cepkin, Mustafa Üstündağ, Nuri Alço and Ümit Besen. The battle of words ended on 23 January 2015, when Erçetin appeared on Beyaz Show again and performed a duet with Öztürk. Sözcü noted that Erçetin's popularity increased considerably thanks to these musical duets, and that in the weeks of the musical battle the singer became one of the most searched names on Google in Turkey and the likes of her Facebook page increased by 600,000. Erçetin later rerecorded the Turkish folk song "A Ballad for Chanakkale" in honor of the 18 March Martyrs Memorial Day and the 101st Anniversary of the Çanakkale Victory. It was released by Turkish Armed Forces' official YouTube channel on 25 April 2015.

After releasing her eighth studio album Ah Bu Şarkıların Gözü Kör Olsun in November 2015, which included covers of Turkish classical songs, Erçetin continued her career with the singles "Kim Korkar" and "Değişiyoruz", both of which were released in 2018. In the same year, she collaborated with Kardeş Türküler and was featured on their song "Bekle". In 2019, Erçetin released a new version of the song "Annem" from her album Elbette, which was used on the soundtrack of the movie Annem (2019), directed by Mustafa Kotan. The music video for the new version was also directed by Kotan and published in September 2019. To mark the 25th year of her career since the release of her first album, Erçetin released her new single "İyi ki" on 31 January 2020.

In 2022, Erçetin's song "Gamsız Hayat" was featured in the critically acclaimed British movie Aftersun.

== Discography ==
- Hazırım (1995) (English: I'm Ready)
- Çapkın (1997) (English: Womanizer)
- Elbette (1999) (English: Of Course)
- Neden (2002) (English: Why?)
- Melek (2004) (English: Angel)
- Kırık Kalpler Durağında (2009) (English: At the Stop of Broken Hearts)
- Milyonlarca Kuştuk... (2013) (English: We Were Millions of Birds...)
- Ah Bu Şarkıların Gözü Kör Olsun (2015) (English: Oh, These Songs Should Blackout)

== Filmography ==
Year	Title	Notes, Role
1993	Gece Melek ve Bizim Çocuklar	film, Aylin
1998	Anlat Şehrazat	musical
2003	Hayat Bilgisi	TV series, Canan Öğretmen (1st episode)
2005	Yıldızların Altında	musical
2006	Yabancı Damat	TV series, Herself (guest appearance)
2009	Gölgesizler	film, Yazar's wife
2019	Annem	film

=== TV programs ===
- Kol Düğmeleri (1994)
- Randevu (1995)
- Günlük Hayat (2001)
- Candan Erçetin'le Beraber ve Solo Şarkılar (March 2007 – June 2008)

== See also ==
- Music of Turkey
- Pop folk
- Southeastern European music
- Turkish pop music

Preceded by MFÖ with "Didai didai dai"	Turkey in the Eurovision Song Contest; 1986 (as Klips ve Onlar)	Succeeded by Seyyal Taner & Locomotif with "Şarkım Sevgi Üstüne"
