= Turkey in the Eurovision Song Contest 1986 =

- Eurovision Song Contest 1986
- Participating broadcaster: Turkish Radio and Television Corporation (TRT)
- Country: Turkey
- Selection process: 10. Eurovision Şarkı Yarışması Türkiye Finali
- Selection date: 15 March 1986

Competing entry
- Song: "Halley"
- Artist: Klips ve Onlar
- Songwriters: Melih Kibar; İlhan İrem

Placement
- Final result: 9th, 53 points

Participation chronology

Turkey was represented at the Eurovision Song Contest 1986 with the song "Halley", composed by Melih Kibar, with lyrics by İlhan İrem, and performed by the quintet Klips ve Onlar. The Turkish participating broadcaster, the Turkish Radio and Television Corporation (TRT), selected its entry through a national final.

== Before Eurovision ==
=== 10. Eurovision Şarkı Yarışması Türkiye Finali ===
The Turkish Radio and Television Corporation (TRT) held the national final on 15 March 1986 at the Ari TV studios in Ankara, hosted by Erkan Yolaç. Four songs competed and the winner was determined by a sixteen-member jury. As there was a tie at the end of the voting, the head of the jury ended up having his vote counted twice, resulting in the victory of "Halley" performed by the quintet Klips ve Onlar (Sevingül Bahadır, Gür Akad, Emre Tukur, Derya Bozkurt and Seden Kutlubay).

Final – 15 March 1986
R/O	Artist	Song	Lyricist	Composer	Votes	Place
1	Klips ve Onlar	"Halley"	İlhan İrem	Melih Kibar	9	1
2	Seyyal Taner	"Dünya"	Olcayto Ahmet Tuğsuz	Olcayto Ahmet Tuğsuz	8	2
3	Nil Burak & İbo	"Yaşa Yaşa"	Aysel Gürel	Selmi Andak	0	3
4	Nilüfer	"Bu Film Bitmeli"	Fikret Şeneş	Selçuk Başar	0	3

== At Eurovision ==
Klips ve Onlar performed eighth on the night of the contest, following the Netherlands and preceding Spain. Before competing in Bergen Seden Kutlubay was replaced in the quintet with Candan Erçetin.

At the close of the voting the song had received 53 points, placing 9th in a field of 20 competing countries. It was the best ranking Turkey had received in the Contest up to that time, and would remain so until 1997.

The members of the Turkish jury included Ayça Eren, Ziya Anadol, Kaan Bozoğlu, Ayşegül Soyalp, Özlem Budakoğlu, Fatma Dikmen, Alaaddin Torun, İlhan Aslanboğan, Zahide Azılı, Saadet Aktemel, and Suhal Eriş.

=== Voting ===
Points awarded to Turkey
Score	Country
12 points	Yugoslavia
10 points	
8 points	Germany; Switzerland
7 points	
6 points	Belgium; Luxembourg; Netherlands
5 points	
4 points	
3 points	Israel
2 points	Austria; United Kingdom
1 point	

Points awarded by Turkey
Score	Country
12 points	Belgium
10 points	Switzerland
8 points	Spain
7 points	Netherlands
6 points	United Kingdom
5 points	Ireland
4 points	Portugal
3 points	Yugoslavia
2 points	Iceland
1 point	Finland
