= United Kingdom in the Eurovision Song Contest 1986 =

- Eurovision Song Contest 1986
- Participating broadcaster: British Broadcasting Corporation (BBC)
- Country: United Kingdom
- Selection process: A Song for Europe 1986
- Selection date: 2 April 1986

Competing entry
- Song: "Runner in the Night"
- Artist: Ryder
- Songwriters: Brian Wade; Maureen Darbyshire

Placement
- Final result: 7th, 72 points

Participation chronology

The United Kingdom was represented at the Eurovision Song Contest 1986 with the song "Runner in the Night", composed by Brian Wade, with lyrics by Maureen Darbyshire, and performed by the group Ryder. The British participating broadcaster, the British Broadcasting Corporation (BBC), selected its entry through a national final.

== Before Eurovision ==
=== A Song for Europe 1986 ===
The British Broadcasting Corporation (BBC) held the national final, A Song for Europe 1986, on 2 April 1986 at Studio 1 of the BBC Television Centre in London, hosted by Terry Wogan. The BBC Concert Orchestra under the direction of Ronnie Hazlehurst as conductor accompanied all but the winning song, but despite performing live, the orchestra were off-screen, behind the set. The rule introduced for 1984 prohibiting groups or 'made for Eurovision' acts from participating was rescinded. In total, 335 entries where received, and reduced tot the final eight by a variety of music industry experts.

Lead singer of the group 'Palace' was Michael Palace, previously known as Dan Duskey; Duskey had represented Ireland in 1982 as one of The Duskeys and thus became the first Eurovision artist to have taken part in the contest for another country before attempting to represent the UK. The group Jump were led by Peter Beckett and David Ian; Beckett had taken part in A Song for Europe 1985 and Ian had been a member of the group First Division in A Song for Europe 1984, as David Lane. Jump's song was written by perennial UK songwriter Paul Curtis, his 19th UK finalist.

The show was opened by 1985's Eurovision winners, Bobbysocks, who sang "Let It Swing", the English-language version of their winning song "La det swinge". They were joined onstage by a large number of backing dancers, choreographed by Anthony van Laast. The duo were also going to sing their brand new single "Waiting for the Morning", but the producers decided to cancel that part of the plan and instead, the two members of the group were interviewed by Terry Wogan during the interval.

The result was determined by 11 regional juries located in Leeds, Newcastle, Plymouth, Birmingham, Cardiff, Manchester, Belfast, Glasgow, London, Norwich and Bristol. Each jury region awarded 15, 12, 10, 9, 8, 7, 6, and 5 points to the songs. The scoreboard, due to a technical issue, was incorrectly adjusted during the broadcast and the final tallies shown on screen did not correspond with the scores announced on air.

The winning entry was "Runner in the Night", performed by the sextet Ryder, composed by Brian Wade, with lyrics written by Maureen Darbyshire.

The national final was broadcast on BBC1, with a simultaneous broadcast on BBC Radio 2 (with commentary by Ray Moore). It received an audience of 14 million viewers.

A Song for Europe 1986 – 2 April 1986
R/O	Artist	Song	Songwriter(s)	Points	Place
1	Vanity Fare	"Dreamer"	Valerie Murtagh Avon	99	3
2	Palace	"Dancing with You Again"	Peter Mason	91	4
3	Colin Heywood	"No Easy Way to Love"	Tony Hiller; Stewart James; Bradley James	80	6
4	Chad Brown	"I'm Sorry"	Paul Griggs	78	7
5	Kenny Charles	"Tongue-Tied"	Jimmy Scott	86	5
6	Ryder	"Runner in the Night"	Brian Wade; Maureen Darbyshire	145	1
7	Jump	"Don't Hang Up on Love"	Paul Curtis; Graham Sacher	137	2
8	Future	"War of the Roses"	Gary Osborne; Johnny Warman	76	8

Detailed Jury Votes
R/O	Song	Birmingham	Manchester	Bristol	Norwich	Newcastle	Cardiff	London	Leeds	Glasgow	Plymouth	Belfast	Total
1	"Dreamer"	6	12	5	6	10	12	7	9	15	10	7	99
2	"Dancing with You Again"	5	7	6	7	6	7	15	10	9	9	10	91
3	"No Easy Way to Love"	7	6	7	9	9	8	5	7	7	6	9	80
4	"I'm Sorry"	8	9	8	8	8	5	6	6	5	7	8	78
5	"Tongue-Tied"	9	8	10	10	7	6	8	8	6	8	6	86
6	"Runner in the Night"	15	15	15	15	12	10	12	12	12	15	12	145
7	"Don't Hang Up on Love"	12	10	12	12	15	15	9	15	10	12	15	137
8	"War of the Roses"	10	5	9	5	5	9	10	5	8	5	5	76
Jury Spokespersons
Birmingham – Paul Coia; Manchester – John Mundy; Bristol – Angela Rippon; Norwich – David Clayton; Newcastle – Mike Neville; Cardiff – Maureen Staffer; London – Colin Berry; Leeds – Linda Dryburgh-Smith; Glasgow – Dougie Donnelly; Plymouth – Christopher Slade; Belfast – Rose Neill

== At Eurovision ==
Ryder performed fifth on the night of the Contest, following Norway and preceding Iceland. At the close of the voting the song had received 72 points, placing 7th in a field of 20 competing countries.

Terry Wogan once again provided the television commentary on BBC 1. BBC Radio 2 also returned broadcasting the contest, with commentary provided by Ray Moore. The BBC appointed Colin Berry as its spokesperson to announce the result of the British jury.

The members of the UK jury included Mr. T Abraham, Mr. A Brown, Miss M Chapman, David Elder, Mrs. M Heathcote, Mr. P Jenkinson, Sue Lloyd, Mrs. T O'Shea, Quentin Smith, Gary Speirs and Miss C White.

=== Voting ===
Points awarded to the United Kingdom
Score	Country
12 points	
10 points	Finland; France
8 points	Denmark; Sweden
7 points	
6 points	Norway; Turkey
5 points	Germany
4 points	Luxembourg; Switzerland
3 points	Austria
2 points	Cyprus; Israel; Portugal; Spain
1 point	

Points awarded by the United Kingdom
Score	Country
12 points	Germany
10 points	Belgium
8 points	Luxembourg
7 points	Yugoslavia
6 points	Denmark
5 points	Switzerland
4 points	Portugal
3 points	Sweden
2 points	Turkey
1 point	Spain
