= Elbette =

Studio album by Candan Erçetin
- Released: 30 November 1999
- Recorded: 1998–1999
- Studios: Erekli & Tunç Studio (Istanbul, Turkey)
- Genre: Pop · folk
- Length: 58:08
- Label: Topkapı
- Producer: Rıza Erekli

Candan Erçetin chronology
Oyalama Artık (1998)	Elbette (1999)	Neden (2002)

Elbette (Of Course) is the third studio album by Turkish singer Candan Erçetin. It was released in 1999 by Topkapı Müzik. A pop and folk album, it was Erçetin's first studio album since the 1997 release of Çapkın. Mete Özgencil wrote eight of the album's songs on his own, and one of them together with Erçetin. This album marked the end of Özgencil and Erçetin's collaboration. Elbette was produced by Rıza Erekli and recorded at Erekli & Tunç Studio in Istanbul.

Elbette contains 13 main songs, in addition to a bonus version of "Söz Vermiştin". Like her first album, Erçetin used elements of Balkan music in this album. Her life events after the release of Çapkın helped with the creation of Elbette. Six of the songs are about her life, and the seven others are mainly concerned with the concept of love. The songs were developed around Erçetin's ideas and were included in the album according to Erçetin's wishes. Music critics gave positive reviews for the album and stated that the work was integrated with the singer's personality and could take the listeners to different areas. The album's first music video was made for the lead single "Elbette", followed by a second music video for the song "Unut Sevme".

After its release, Elbette topped Turkey's list of best-selling albums for two months, and by the end of 2000 sold 1,050,000 copies, becoming the best-selling album of the year. In December 2009, NTV's music judges chose the album as the Best Turkish Album of the 2000s.

== Background and content ==
Candan Erçetin made her debut in 1995 with the album Hazırım, which included elements of Balkan music, and in 1997 her second studio album Çapkın was released. She worked with Mete Özgencil on both of these albums. In March 1998, Erçetin confirmed that she was planning on preparing a new studio album and said: "We are looking for a new sound by following where the music is going in the world, but the main line and theme will not change that much. In short, I will sing the songs that I love." On 11 August 1999, it was reported that the album would be released in autumn and that five of the songs had been prepared. Erçetin later stated that she was the most nervous and paranoid person during the preparation process. The new album was not released in early autumn 1999, and its release was postponed to a later date. Candan Erçetin's third studio album, Elbette, was released in November 1999 by Topkapı Müzik. The singer explained the album's content with these words:

"I think it is a very intimate album. What I experienced after the release of Çapkın, helped me in forming Elbette. I want to evaluate its success in two ways. One is the spiritual angle, and what I hear from everyone about it really makes me happy and gives me the strength to go on. The financial angle is determined by commercial performance, and believe me, it is less interesting for me..."

I'm my mother's last, or in other words, third child. She gave birth to me when she was 37. Since my early childhood, she used to say 'I had you at an advanced age, you may lose me at any moment'. I've grown up and I said to myself that I needed to write something for my mother. A gift for her... The lyrics were written by my niece. Aylin [Atalay] is a good poet, but I'm trying to direct her in writing the lyrics. My mother's name is Mevlüde. Like other people of Albanian descent. A very typical Albanian name.

— Candan Erçetin's words about the song "Annem".

The album was produced by Rıza Erekli and features elements of pop and folk music. All of the album's songs were chosen in accordance with Erçetin's wishes. Erçetin was planning on including two French songs in the album, but as they would not fit well with the track list, she decided to put the idea aside. The recordings were done at Erekli & Tunç Studio in Istanbul. Out of the album's 13 songs, six of them were about her life, and the seven others were concerned with the concept of love. Eight of the songs were solely written by Mete Özgencil, and the eighth song "Olmaz" was written by Özgencil together with Candan Erçetin. Erçetin composed the song "Merak Ediyorum" by getting inspiration from the French song "Le Meteque", and participated in composing six of the album's songs in total. She also performed a new version of the song "Unut Sevme", which had originally been released in 1960 by Güzide Kasacı. The Greek Gypsy song "Adieu mon pays" was turned into Turkish and included in the album under the title "Söz Vermiştin" . The song's acoustic version was included as a bonus at the end of the album's CD. The composition of the Albanian türkü "Şota", which Erçetin had performed in a number of her concerts, was used for the album's twelfth song "Dünya Durma". The thirteenth song "Annem" was written as a tribute Erçetin's mother Mevlüde Erçetin. Candan Erçetin included the dates at which the songs were made in the album's booklet: "Söz Vermiştin" in August 1998, "Olmaz" in September 1998, "Aklım Almıyor" in December 1998, "Arada Bir" and "Bana Güven" in January 1999, "Annem" in March 1999, "Dayan" in April 1999, "Elbette" in June 1999, "Saçma" and "İster Sallan Gez" in July 1999, and "Dünya Durma" in October 1999. "Merak Ediyorum" was prepared in two different time periods: in August 1998 its lyrics were written, and in February 1999 its composition was prepared. In the booklet, it is stated that "Unut Sevme" was first released in July 1961.

Elbette entered Turkey's list of best-selling albums on 15 January 2000 and initially ranked second. The next week, on 22 January 2000, it surpassed Ebru Gündeş's Dön Ne Olur (1999) and topped the chart. It continued to keep the first position until 25 March 2000, remaining in the top position for more than two months. Elbette sold 850,000 copies in seven months, and by the end of 2000 it sold 1,050,000 copies in total. The album became Turkey's best-selling album of the year. Elbette also marked the end of collaboration between Mete Özgencil and Candan Erçetin, who had worked with each other since Hazırım (1995). The two did not work on any of Erçetin's subsequent albums together.

== Critical reception ==
Elbette received positive reviews from music critics. Hürriyet's Lale Barçın İmer pointed out the "hidden power and nobility" inside the album and believed that the singer had continued to keep her main theme in this work. She also mentioned that Mete Özgencil's "magical words" had become entangled with Erçetin's voice, resulting in a good work. She liked 10 of the album's songs, all of which she initially viewed as "typical Candan Erçetin" pieces, but the songs filled her with different emotions when she went through them carefully. Milliyet's İpek Durkal found the work to be in the same line as Erçetin's previous album. He named "Merak Ediyorum" as his favorite song, and believed that the songs on this album had become integrated with Erçetin and her artistic personality. Zaman's Abdullah Kılıç included the album in his positive reviews for the end of the year, and stated that the album was able to take the listener to different areas, "from the Balkans, to Anatolia and sometimes in the borders of the Mediterranean". He believed that with this work, Erçetin would always remain in the memories. He also added that "Elbette", "Dünya Durma" and "Unut Sevme" were the most listened songs in Turkey in 2000. In December 2009, Elbette was chosen by NTV's music judges as the Best Turkish Album of the 2000s.

== Music videos ==
In an interview in 1998, Erçetin expressed her opinions about music videos: "I want to turn the tables. The only way to introduce a song is not with a music video. The video should be the bonus of a loved and desired song. We've already experienced this example. 'Yalan' [her song] rose up through the radios, and climbed to the top of the chart. The video was then made at the request of fans." She also announced that she had no plans to make music videos for Elbette. As to why she released the album without an accompanying video she said: "To this day I used to release music videos as well, but with this album we decided to do the opposite thing. First the album came out, and now we wanted to see how loyal our listeners are to us. We wondered whether we have listeners or viewers, that is why we released the album without a music video." There were eventually two music videos released for the songs "Elbette" and "Unut Sevme". The music video for "Elbette" was directed by Bozkurt Bayer. "Unut Sevme" was released together with the prepared remix versions on a separate disc in October 2000.

== Track listing ==
No.	Title	Writer(s)	Composer(s)	Length
1.	"Dayan"	Mete Özgencil	Özgencil · Candan Erçetin · Alper Erinç	4:03
2.	"Elbette"	Erçetin	Akın Ertübey	4:20
3.	"Arada Bir"	Özgencil	Özgencil	4:34
4.	"Söz Vermiştin"	Özgencil	Anonymous	4:15
5.	"Unut Sevme"	A. Baki Çallıoğlu	Çallıoğlu	4:42
6.	"Merak Ediyorum"	Sinan	Erçetin	4:56
7.	"Saçma"	Özgencil	Özgencil · Erçetin · Kıvanç K.	4:44
8.	"Olmaz"	Erçetin · Özgencil	Ertübey	4:07
9.	"İster Sallan Gez"	Özgencil	Özgencil · Erçetin · Kıvanç K.	3:48
10.	"Bana Güven"	Özgencil	Özgencil · Erçetin · Kıvanç K.	3:56
11.	"Aklım Almıyor"	Özgencil	Özgencil · Erçetin	3:18
12.	"Dünya Durma"	Özgencil	Anonymous	3:28
13.	"Annem"	Z. Aylin Atalay	Erçetin	3:21

CD bonus song
No.	Title	Writer(s)	Composer(s)	Length
14.	"Söz Vermiştin" (Acoustic Version)	Özgencil	Anonymous	4:36
Total length:				58:08

Notes

- In the album's booklet, the composer of "Söz Vermiştin" has been marked as anonymous, but it was in fact composed by Enrico Macias.

== Personnel ==
- Topkapı Müzik – production company
- Rıza Erekli – album producer
- Candan Erçetin – singer, songwriter, composer
- Mete Özgencil – songwriter, composer, art director, supervisor
- Alper Erinç – composer, arranger, guitar
- Kıvanç K. – arranger, mixing, composer, producer
- A. Baki Çallıoğlu – songwriter, composer
- Aylin Atalay – songwriter
- Sinan – songwriter
- Akın Ertübey – composer
- Erekli & Tunç Stüdyosu – recording, mixing
- Mediaworx DS. (Berlin) – mastering
- İlker Akman – arranger
- Tolga Tekin – arranger
- Bekir Sakarya – accordion
- Edvard Aris – accordion
- Nurhat Şensesli – bass guitar
- Zafer Dalgıç – cura, tanpura
- Balık Ayhan ve Grubu – cümbüş, violin, clarinet, zurna, bendir, goblet drum
- Deniz Selman – duduk
- Fuat Domaniç – arrangement
- Ali Koç – guitar
- Nevzat Doğansoy – guitar
- Mustafa Süder – violin
- Özcan Şenyaylar – violin
- Göksun Çavdar – clarinet, saxophone
- Tolga Görsev – melody guitar, tonmeister
- Serkan Kula – tonmeister
- Hamiyet Akpınar – make-up
- Tamer Değer – hair
- Sibel & Özgür Arcan – graphic design

Credits adapted from Elbette's album booklet.

== Charts ==
Chart (1999–2000)	Peak position
Turkey (Best-Selling Albums)	1

== Release history ==
Country	Date	Format	Label
Turkey	30 November 1999	CD · cassette	Topkapı Müzik
Worldwide	20 January 2013	Digital download	Topkapı Müzik
