= Cyprus in the Eurovision Song Contest 1986 =

- Eurovision Song Contest 1986
- Participating broadcaster: Cyprus Broadcasting Corporation (CyBC)
- Country: Cyprus
- Selection process: Song: National final Artist: Internal selection
- Announcement date: Song: 19 February 1986; Artist: 19 March 1986

Competing entry
- Song: "Tora zo"
- Artist: Elpida
- Songwriters: Phivos Gavris; Peter Yiannaki

Placement
- Final result: 20th (last), 4 points

Participation chronology

Cyprus was represented at the Eurovision Song Contest 1986 with the song "Tora zo", written by Phivos Gavris and Peter Yiannaki, and performed by Elpida. The Cypriot participating broadcaster, the Cyprus Broadcasting Corporation (CyBC), selected its entry through a national final and, subsequently, the performer internally once the national final was over.

== Before Eurovision ==
=== National final ===
==== Competing entries ====
The Cyprus Broadcasting Corporation (CyBC) confirmed its participation in the 1986 contest on 19 November 1985 and opened a submission period for entries until 11 January 1986, that was extended until 20 January 1986. By the end of the submission period, CyBC had received 64 entries. However, three entries were disqualified during the initial presentation of the songs when they were found to break the preselection rules.

==== Format ====
On 6 February 1986, after the song submission period, CyBC held a meeting to discuss the selection procedure of its entry for the Eurovision Song Contest 1986. It was decided to have a national final with a similar format to their 1984 and 1985 selections, but without a public jury. The national final was held on 19 February 1986 in the Hall of Nations in the Filoxenia hotel in Nicosia. The results were decided by a 44-member jury consisting of 17 musicians, 13 journalists, 9 CyBC employees, and 5 representatives of the municipalities of Cyprus.

The competition consisted of five stages and lasted the entire day, from around 10:00 EET until 22:00 EET. In the first stage, the submitted recordings of all 64 songs were presented, the invalid entries were removed from the competition, and each jury member chose their sixteen favourite songs, after which the votes were collected. The sixteen songs with the highest number of votes progressed to the second stage. In the second stage, the sixteen songs were presented again and were then whittled down to eight songs, which were then whittled down to four and then two songs. The winner was chosen out of the final two songs, where each juror gave one vote to their favourite song. The last part of the competition, with the final four songs, was broadcast live at 21:05 EET on television in a program called Diagonismós Tragoudioú Giourovízion.

Fourth stage - 19 February 1986
R/O	Artist	Song	Songwriter(s)	Result
12	Anna Vissi	"Thelo na gino star" (Θέλω να γίνω στάρ)	Andreas Giorgallis; Stavros Sideras	Advanced
26	Panikos Charalambous	"Tora zo" (Τώρα ζω)	Peter Yiannaki; Phivos Gavris	Advanced
	Alexia & Andros Papapavlou	"Tragoudo" (Τραγουδώ)	Andros Papapavlou	—N/a
		"Mechri chtes" (Μέχρι χτες)		—N/a

Fifth and final stage - 19 February 1986
R/O	Artist	Song	Points	Place
12	Anna Vissi	"Thelo na gino star" (Θέλω να γίνω στάρ)	15	2
26	Panikos Charalambous	"Tora zo" (Τώρα ζω)	29	1

=== Artist change ===
Shortly after the national final, Peter Yianniki entered discussions on how to stage and perform "Tora zo" at the Eurovision Song Contest with CyBC. Peter Yianniki proposed that the song be performed by a group of three boys and three girls, with Panikos Charalambous being the main singer. However, CyBC believed that the entry should be sung by a different singer, as they believed Panikos Charalambous' voice was more suited to folk songs, and started looking for famous Greek singers to represent Cyprus. On 19 March 1986, CyBC announced that a 3-member group had chosen Elpida to replace Panikos Charalambous as the singer of "Tora zo" at the Eurovision Song Contest in Bergen.

== At Eurovision ==
On the night of the final, Elpida performed fifteenth in the running order, following Germany and preceding Austria. At the close of voting, "Tora zo" had received 4 points, placing Cyprus in last place out of 20 countries. The Cypriot jury awarded its 12 points to Yugoslavia.

=== Voting ===
Points awarded to Cyprus
Score	Country
12 points	
10 points	
8 points	
7 points	
6 points	
5 points	
4 points	
3 points	Yugoslavia
2 points	
1 point	Ireland

Points awarded by Cyprus
Score	Country
12 points	Yugoslavia
10 points	Belgium
8 points	Luxembourg
7 points	Denmark
6 points	Norway
5 points	Switzerland
4 points	Iceland
3 points	Finland
2 points	United Kingdom
1 point	Netherlands
