= Netherlands in the Eurovision Song Contest 1986 =

- Eurovision Song Contest 1986
- Participating broadcaster: Nederlandse Omroep Stichting (NOS)
- Country: Netherlands
- Selection process: Nationaal Songfestival 1986
- Selection date: 1 April 1986

Competing entry
- Song: "Alles heeft ritme"
- Artist: Frizzle Sizzle
- Songwriters: Peter Schön; Rob ten Bokum

Placement
- Final result: 13th, 40 points

Participation chronology

The Netherlands was represented at the Eurovision Song Contest 1986 with the song "Alles heeft ritme", written by Peter Schön and Rob ten Bokum, and performed by Frizzle Sizzle. The Dutch participating broadcaster, Nederlandse Omroep Stichting (NOS), selected its entry for the contest through a national final.

== Before Eurovision ==
=== Nationaal Songfestival 1986 ===
Nederlandse Omroep Stichting (NOS) held the national final on 1 April 1986 at the Theater De Flint in Amersfoort, hosted by the pianist and television host Pim Jacobs. Twelve regional juries across the Netherlands selected the winning song.

The winning entry was "Alles heeft een ritme", performed by the teenage girl group Frizzle Sizzle. The song was composed by Peter Schön and Rob ten Bokum, and the lyrics were written by Schön.

Final – 1 April 1986
R/O	Artist	Song	Points	Place
1	Michelle	"Benjamin"	68	7
2	Jody Pijper	"Sam"	83	4
3	Frizzle Sizzle	"Alles heeft een ritme"	117	1
4	Astrid Marz	"De stilte na de storm"	32	9
5	DeeDee	"Fata morgana"	96	2
6	Michelle	"Alleen jouw lach"	26	10
7	Jody Pijper	"Muziek"	79	6
8	Frizzle Sizzle	"Eenmaal jong"	82	5
9	Astrid Marz	"Nooit meer"	35	8
10	DeeDee	"Ik speel de clown"	85	3

== At Eurovision ==
Frizzle Sizzle performed seventh on the night of the contest, following Iceland and preceding Turkey. By the time the song got to Bergen, it was simply credited as "Alles heeft ritme".

At the close of the voting the song had received 40 points, placing 13th in a field of 20 competing countries. This placing was identical to the previous time the Netherlands had competed in Eurovision, in 1984.

The Dutch conductor at the contest was Harry van Hoof.

=== Voting ===
Points awarded to the Netherlands
Score	Country
12 points	
10 points	Germany
8 points	Israel
7 points	Portugal; Turkey
6 points	
5 points	
4 points	
3 points	Finland
2 points	Yugoslavia
1 point	Cyprus; Luxembourg; Spain

Points awarded by the Netherlands
Score	Country
12 points	Switzerland
10 points	Belgium
8 points	Luxembourg
7 points	Yugoslavia
6 points	Turkey
5 points	Iceland
4 points	Denmark
3 points	Sweden
2 points	Norway
1 point	Finland
