= Sweden in the Eurovision Song Contest 1986 =

- Eurovision Song Contest 1986
- Participating broadcaster: Sveriges Television (SVT)
- Country: Sweden
- Selection process: Melodifestivalen 1986
- Selection date: 22 March 1986

Competing entry
- Song: "E' de' det här du kallar kärlek?"
- Artist: Lasse Holm and Monica Törnell
- Songwriter: Lasse Holm

Placement
- Final result: 5th, 78 points

Participation chronology

Sweden was represented at the Eurovision Song Contest 1986 with the song "E' de' det här du kallar kärlek?", written by Lasse Holm, and performed by Lasse Holm and Monica Törnell. The Swedish participating broadcaster, Sveriges Television (SVT), selected its entry through Melodifestivalen 1986.

== Before Eurovision ==
=== Melodifestivalen 1986 ===
Melodifestivalen 1986 was the contest for the 26th song to represent Sweden at the Eurovision Song Contest. 90 songs had been submitted to Sveriges Television (SVT) for the competition; 10 of these were performed at the contest, which was held at Cirkus in Stockholm on 22 March 1986. It was presented by Lennart Swahn and Tommy Engstrand and was broadcast on TV1. No orchestra was used, and instead the ten songs were broadcast as music videos. The five songs that qualified for the second round were performed live to backing track.

| R/O | Artist | Song | Songwriter(s) | Result |
|---|---|---|---|---|
| 1 | Dan Tillberg | "ABCD" | Svante Persson; Dan Tillberg; Ingela 'Pling' Forsman | —N/a |
| 2 | Git Persson | "Du förför mig" | Anders Berglund; Lotta Winberg | —N/a |
| 3 | Style | "Dover–Calais" | Tommy Ekman; Christer Sandelin | Qualified |
| 4 | Lasse Holm and Monica Törnell | "E' de' det här du kallar kärlek?" | Lasse Holm | Qualified |
| 5 | Anna Book | "ABC" | Martin Contra; Björn Frisén; Keith Almgren | Qualified |
| 6 | Sound of Music | "Eldorado" | Peter Grönvall; Angélique Widengren; Nanne Nordqvist | Qualified |
| 7 | Baden-Baden | "Jag har en dröm" | Martin Contra; Björn Frisén; Keith Almgren | —N/a |
| 8 | Fredrik Willstrand | "Fem i tolv" | Joakim Bergman; Monica Forsberg | —N/a |
| 9 | Lena Philipsson | "Kärleken är evig" | Torgny Söderberg; Per Gessle | Qualified |
| 10 | Karin Risberg | "Stopp, stopp, stanna" | Kjell Lövbom; Peo Thyrén | —N/a |

| Artist | Song | Points | Place |
|---|---|---|---|
| Style | "Dover–Calais" | 33 | 3 |
| Lasse Holm and Monica Törnell | "E' de' det här du kallar kärlek?" | 64 | 1 |
| Anna Book | "ABC" | 24 | 5 |
| Sound of Music | "Eldorado" | 26 | 4 |
| Lena Philipsson | "Kärleken är evig" | 42 | 2 |

Voting
| Song | 56–60 | 51–55 | 46–50 | 41–45 | 36–40 | 31–35 | 26–30 | 21–25 | 15–20 | Total |
|---|---|---|---|---|---|---|---|---|---|---|
| "Dover-Calais" | 6 | 2 | 4 | 4 | 1 | 1 | 1 | 6 | 8 | 33 |
| "E' de' det här du kallar kärlek?" | 8 | 8 | 8 | 6 | 6 | 6 | 8 | 8 | 6 | 64 |
| "ABC" | 2 | 4 | 6 | 2 | 2 | 4 | 2 | 1 | 1 | 24 |
| "Eldorado" | 4 | 1 | 2 | 1 | 4 | 2 | 6 | 4 | 2 | 26 |
| "Kärleken är evig" | 1 | 6 | 1 | 8 | 8 | 8 | 4 | 2 | 4 | 42 |

== At Eurovision ==
=== Voting ===
Points awarded to Sweden
| Score | Country |
|---|---|
| 12 points | Iceland; Switzerland |
| 10 points | |
| 8 points | |
| 7 points | Norway; Spain; Yugoslavia |
| 6 points | Denmark |
| 5 points | Austria; Finland; Luxembourg |
| 4 points | Germany |
| 3 points | Netherlands; United Kingdom |
| 2 points | France |
| 1 point | |

Points awarded by Sweden
| Score | Country |
|---|---|
| 12 points | Switzerland |
| 10 points | Luxembourg |
| 8 points | United Kingdom |
| 7 points | Ireland |
| 6 points | Belgium |
| 5 points | Germany |
| 4 points | Denmark |
| 3 points | France |
| 2 points | Iceland |
| 1 point | Yugoslavia |
