= Belgium in the Eurovision Song Contest 1986 =

- Eurovision Song Contest 1986
- Participating broadcaster: Radio-télévision belge de la Communauté française (RTBF)
- Country: Belgium
- Selection process: Finale Nationale du Concours Eurovision de la Chanson 1986
- Selection date: 2 March 1986

Competing entry
- Song: "J'aime la vie"
- Artist: Sandra Kim
- Songwriters: Jean-Paul Furnémont; Angelo Crisci; Rosario Marino Atria

Placement
- Final result: 1st, 176 points

Participation chronology

Belgium was represented at the Eurovision Song Contest 1986 with the song "J'aime la vie", composed by Jean-Paul Furnémont and Angelo Crisci, with lyrics by Rosario Marino Atria, and performed by Sandra Kim. The Belgian participating broadcaster, Walloon Radio-télévision belge de la Communauté française (RTBF), selected its entry through a national final. The entry eventually won the Eurovision Song Contest as the first-ever victory for Belgium in the contest.

== Before Eurovision ==
=== Finale Nationale du Concours Eurovision de la Chanson 1986 ===
Walloon broadcaster Radio-télévision belge de la Communauté française (RTBF) held the Belgian national final on 2 March at 20:05 (CET) in its television studios in Brussels, hosted by Patrick Duhamel. After the initial broadcast, the winning song was decided by the following formula: 50% of the final tabulation would come from 12 music experts and 50% would come from 500 Belgian TV viewers polled to make up a fair segment of the Belgian population. Another programme was then broadcast at 22:30 (CET) announcing the winner of the national final. The winning entry was "J'aime la vie", performed by Sandra Kim, composed by Jean-Paul Furnémont and Angelo Crisci, with lyrics written by Rosario Marino Atria.

Final – 2 March 1986
R/O	Artist	Song	Songwriter(s)	Place
1	Michel Almann	"Toi"	Frank Degryse; Francis Weyer; Michel Detry	—N/a
2	Axel Faye	"Tope là!"	Luce Bove; Claude Vougeot	—N/a
3	Formule II	"Tout, je te donne tout"	Eddy Pascal; Alexandre Pascal	—N/a
4	Elizabeth Granec	"Mon pays, c'est la terre"	Alex Busanel; Elizabeth Granec	—N/a
5	Dino Lizi	"Chante avec nous"	Roland De Greef; Dino Polizzi	—N/a
6	Makof	"S.O.S."	Makof; Suzy	—N/a
7	Sandra Kim	"J'aime la vie"	Jean-Paul Furnémont; Angelo Crisci; Rosario Marino Atria	1
8	Toxic	"L'aventure c'est toi"	Bernard Brochier; Jean-Paul Nicolaij	—N/a
9	Jean-Claude Watrin	"Au-delà de nos rêves"	Jean-Claude Watrin; Paul Elias	—N/a

== At Eurovision ==
Sandra Kim performed thirteenth on the night of the Contest, following Ireland and preceding Germany. At the close of the voting the song had received 176 points, placing 1st in a field of 20 competing countries. It was the first win for Belgium in the Contest, something they have not been able to replicate since.

Belgium scored an absolute record at the time, with Sandra Kim earning a never seen before number of 176 points (that record remained until 1993, with Ireland scoring 187 points), an average of 9.26 points per voting nation. Kim received 77.2% of the maximum possible score, which, as of 2024 still ranks 8th among all Eurovision winners.

=== Voting ===
Points awarded to Belgium
Score	Country
12 points	Finland; France; Ireland; Portugal; Turkey
10 points	Cyprus; Denmark; Iceland; Luxembourg; Netherlands; Spain; Switzerland; United Kingdom; Yugoslavia
8 points	Norway
7 points	
6 points	Austria; Sweden
5 points	Israel
4 points	
3 points	
2 points	
1 point	Germany

Points awarded by Belgium
Score	Country
12 points	Switzerland
10 points	Luxembourg
8 points	Finland
7 points	Germany
6 points	Turkey
5 points	Norway
4 points	Yugoslavia
3 points	Spain
2 points	Ireland
1 point	Austria
