= Iceland in the Eurovision Song Contest 1986 =

- Eurovision Song Contest 1986
- Participating broadcaster: Ríkisútvarpið (RÚV)
- Country: Iceland
- Selection process: Song: Söngvakeppni Sjónvarpsins 1986; Artist: Internal selection
- Announcement date: Song: 15 March 1986; Artist: 20 March 1986

Competing entry
- Song: "Gleðibankinn"
- Artist: ICY
- Songwriter: Magnús Eiríksson

Placement
- Final result: 16th, 19 points

Participation chronology

Iceland was represented at the Eurovision Song Contest 1986 with the song "Gleðibankinn", written by Magnús Eiríksson, and performed by the band ICY. The Icelandic participating broadcaster, Ríkisútvarpið (RÚV), selected its entry through a national final and, subsequently, the performers internally once the national final was over. This was the first-ever entry from Iceland in the Eurovision Song Contest, and the first-ever entry performed in Icelandic in the contest.

== Background ==
While the country had satellite television contact from other nations (the United States and Canada) since 1981, Iceland was not able to connect to other European nations by satellite before the end of 1985, meaning that 1986 was the first year Iceland could send a delegation to the Eurovision Song Contest.

On 26 October 1985, the Icelandic national broadcaster, Ríkisútvarpið (RÚV), confirmed its intentions to participate in the contest for the first time in the 1986 edition. RÚV, which broadcast every Eurovision Song Contest from 1970 to 1985 in Iceland, announced that it would also organise the selection process for its entry in addition to broadcasting further events within the nation. The broadcaster selected its debut entry in 1986 through the national selection show Söngvakeppnin.

== Before Eurovision ==
=== Söngvakeppni Sjónvarpsins 1986 ===
Söngvakeppni Sjónvarpsins 1986 was the national final format developed by RÚV in order to select its entry for the Eurovision Song Contest 1986. The competition was held on 15 March 1986 at the RÚV Studios in Reykjavík, hosted by Jónas R. Jónsson and broadcast on RÚV and via radio on Ras 2.

==== Competing entries ====
On 5 December 1985, RÚV opened the submission period for interested songwriters to submit their entries until the deadline on 15 January 1986, however, deadline was later postponed until 25 January. 287 entries were submitted during the submission period, from which a jury panel selected 10 songs for the contest. The ten competing artists and songs were revealed by the broadcaster on 7 March 1986. Following the announcement of the competing acts, it was revealed that two of the selected songs: "Vögguvísa" performed by Erna Gunnarsdóttir and "Ég lifi í draumi" performed by Björgvin Halldórsson, have violated the contest rules, which required the participating songs to be neither publicly performed nor released commercially before Eurovision final. For unknown reasons, aforementioned artists were still allowed to participate with ineligible songs.

Competing entries
Artist	Song	Songwriter(s)
Björgvin Halldórsson	"Ef"	Jóhann G. Jóhannsson
Björgvin Halldórsson	"Ég lifi í draumi"	Eyjólfur Kristjánsson; Aðalsteinn Ásberg Sigurðsson
Eiríkur Hauksson	"Gefðu mér gaum"	Gunnar Þórðarson; Ólafur Haukur Símonarson
Eiríkur Hauksson	"Mitt á milli Moskvu og Washington"	Ragnhildur Gísladóttir; Jakob Frímann Magnússon; Valgeir Guðjónsson
Eiríkur Hauksson	"Þetta gengur ekki lengur"	Ómar Halldórsson
Erna Gunnarsdóttir and Björgvin Halldórsson	"Með vaxandi þrá"	Geirmundur Valtýsson; Hjálmar Jónsson
Erna Gunnarsdóttir and Pálmi Gunnarsson	"Út vil ek"	Valgeir Guðjónsson
Erna Gunnarsdóttir	"Vögguvísa"	Ólafur Haukur Símonarson
Pálmi Gunnarsson	"Gleðibankinn"	Magnús Eiríksson
Pálmi Gunnarsson	"Syngdu lag"	Þórir Baldursson; Rúnar Júlíusson

==== Final ====
The final was held on 15 March 1986. The votes of a five-member jury decided the winner, although only the top five placings were announced. The winning entry was "Gleðibankinn", performed by Pálmi Gunnarsson and composed by Magnús Eiríksson. In addition to the performances of the competing entries, 1985 Eurovision winners Bobbysocks performed their winning song "La det swinge" and a new song entitled "Midnight Rocks".

Final – 15 March 1986
R/O	Artist	Song	Place
1	Pálmi Gunnarsson	"Gleðibankinn"	1
2	Eiríkur Hauksson	"Þetta gengur ekki lengur"	—N/a
3	Erna Gunnarsdóttir and Björgvin Halldórsson	"Með vaxandi þrá"	4
4	Pálmi Gunnarsson	"Syngdu lag"	—N/a
5	Eiríkur Hauksson	"Gefðu mér gaum"	—N/a
6	Erna Gunnarsdóttir and Pálmi Gunnarsson	"Út vil ek"	—N/a
7	Björgvin Halldórsson	"Ef"	2
8	Erna Gunnarsdóttir	"Vögguvísa"	5
9	Eiríkur Hauksson	"Mitt á milli Moskvu og Washington"	—N/a
10	Björgvin Halldórsson	"Ég lifi í draumi"	3

=== Artist change ===
On 20 March 1986, RÚV announced that eventual Söngvakeppnin winner Pálmi Gunnarsson will perform "Gleðibankinn" at the Eurovision Song Contest as part of newly created 3-member band ICY, alongside Helga Möller and fellow Söngvakeppnin 1986 participant Eiríkur Hauksson.

== At Eurovision ==
The contest was broadcast on Sjónvarpið and on radio station Rás 1 (both with commentary by Þorgeir Ástvaldsson).

The group performed sixth on the night of the contest, following the United Kingdom and preceding the Netherlands. At the close of the voting it had received 19 points, placing 16th in a field of 20 competing countries. Iceland's first-ever points were awarded to them by the Netherlands (who gave the song five of the eventual 19 points).

The members of the Icelandic jury included Berglind Orradóttir, Davíð Scheving Thorsteinsson, Elsa Björnsdóttir, Guðjón Vigfússon, Guðlaug Þorsteinsdóttir, Karl Þorsteins, Margrét Stefánsdóttir, Ríkharður Ríkharðsson, Salóme Þorkelsdóttir, Sigurdór Sigurdórsson, and Svanhildur Kristjónsdóttir.

=== Voting ===
Points awarded to Iceland
Score	Country
12 points	
10 points	
8 points	
7 points	
6 points	Spain
5 points	Netherlands
4 points	Cyprus
3 points	
2 points	Sweden; Turkey
1 point	

Points awarded by Iceland
Score	Country
12 points	Sweden
10 points	Belgium
8 points	Ireland
7 points	Denmark
6 points	Finland
5 points	Yugoslavia
4 points	Norway
3 points	Switzerland
2 points	Spain
1 point	Luxembourg
