= Denmark in the Eurovision Song Contest 1986 =

- Eurovision Song Contest 1986
- Participating broadcaster: Danmarks Radio (DR)
- Country: Denmark
- Selection process: Dansk Melodi Grand Prix 1986
- Selection date: 22 February 1986

Competing entry
- Song: "Du er fuld af løgn"
- Artist: Lise Haavik
- Songwriter: John Hatting

Placement
- Final result: 6th, 77 points

Participation chronology

Denmark was represented at the Eurovision Song Contest 1986 with the song "Du er fuld af løgn", written by John Hatting, and performed by Lise Haavik. The Danish participating broadcaster, Danmarks Radio (DR), organised the Dansk Melodi Grand Prix 1986 in order to select its entry for the contest.

== Before Eurovision ==
=== Dansk Melodi Grand Prix 1986 ===
Danmarks Radio (DR) held its national final titled Dansk Melodi Grand Prix 1986 at TV-Byen in Gladsaxe on 22 February 1986 at 20:15 CEST. It was broadcast on DR TV. The program was produced by Jens Bom, with the set being designed by Søren Breum, and hosted by Jørgen de Mylius. Ten songs, which were accompanied by choreography by Louise Frevert, took part in the competition, with the winner being decided by voting from five regional juries in two rounds. In the first round, the five lowest-placed songs were eliminated without full voting being revealed, then the remaining five were voted on again to give the winner.

The winning entry was "Du er fuld af løgn", performed by Lise Haavik and written by John Hatting.

First Round – 22 February 1986
R/O	Artist	Song	Composer	Lyricist	Result
1	Keld and Hilda Heick	"Mirakler"	Carsten Lehn	Hilda Heick; Keld Heick	Advanced
2	Lise Haavik	"Du er fuld af løgn"	John Hatting		Advanced
3	J.P. West	"Si' det er mig"	J.P. West		—N/a
4	Lotte Rømer	"Dig og mig"	Lotte Rømer		—N/a
5	Brødrene Olsen	"Fællessang i parken"	Jørgen Olsen		—N/a
6	Lecia Jønsson	"Hvis nu lykken findes"	Lecia Jønsson		—N/a
7	Kirsten and Søren	"Sig det som det er"	Søren Bundgaard	Keld Heick	Advanced
8	Lørdagskyllingerne	"Syng en sang"	Michael Hardinger		—N/a
9	Fenders	"Vild med eventyr"	Helge Engelbrecht	Jacob Jonia Svendsen	Advanced
10	Birthe Kjær	"Vil du med"	Leif Pedersen; Per Meilstrup	Keld Heick	Advanced

Second Round – 22 February 1986
R/O	Artist	Song	Regional Juries					Total	Place
R/O	Artist	Song	North and West Jutland	Zealand and Islands	East and South Jutland	Greater Copenhagen	Funen	Total	Place
1	Kirsten and Søren	"Sig det som det er"	1	8	4	2	2	17	4
2	Lise Haavik	"Du er fuld af løgn"	8	6	6	8	1	29	1
3	Keld and Hilda Heick	"Mirakler"	2	1	1	6	4	14	5
4	Fenders	"Vild med eventyr"	6	2	2	4	6	20	3
5	Birthe Kjær	"Vil du med"	4	4	8	1	8	25	2

== At Eurovision ==
Haavik performed eighteenth on the night of the contest, following Sweden and preceding Finland. At the close of the voting the song had received 77 points, placing 6th in a field of 20 competing countries. This high placing was the start of five top-ten finishes for Denmark in the Contest.

The contest was broadcast on DR TV, with commentary by Jørgen de Mylius.

=== Voting ===
Points awarded to Denmark
Score	Country
12 points	
10 points	Norway; Israel
8 points	
7 points	Cyprus; Germany; Iceland
6 points	United Kingdom
5 points	France; Portugal; Spain
4 points	Ireland; Netherlands; Sweden
3 points	Switzerland
2 points	
1 point	

Points awarded by Denmark
Score	Country
12 points	Ireland
10 points	Belgium
8 points	United Kingdom
7 points	Germany
6 points	Sweden
5 points	Norway
4 points	Switzerland
3 points	Spain
2 points	Luxembourg
1 point	Portugal
