= Yugoslavia in the Eurovision Song Contest 1986 =

- Eurovision Song Contest 1986
- Participating broadcaster: Jugoslavenska radiotelevizija (JRT)
- Country: Yugoslavia
- Selection process: Jugovizija 1986
- Selection date: 7 March 1986

Competing entry
- Song: "Željo moja"
- Artist: Doris Dragović
- Songwriter: Zrinko Tutić

Placement
- Final result: 11th, 49 points

Participation chronology

Yugoslavia was represented at the Eurovision Song Contest 1986 with the song "Željo moja", written by Zrinko Tutić, and performed by Doris Dragović. The Yugoslav participating broadcaster, Jugoslavenska radiotelevizija (JRT), selected its entry through Jugovizija 1986.

== Before Eurovision ==
=== Jugovizija 1986 ===
The Yugoslav national final to select their entry was held on 7 March 1986, at the Palace of Youth and Sports in Pristina, and was hosted by Enver Petrovci. 350 songs were submitted for the national final.

Each of the eight JRT participating sub-national broadcasters (RTV Sarajevo, RTV Skopje, RTV Novi Sad, RTV Titograd, RTV Zagreb, RTV Belgrade, RTV Ljubljana, and RTV Pristina) entered two songs to Jugovizija, making a national final of sixteen songs. The winner was decided by the votes of the regional juries of the eight broadcasters, which could not vote for their own entries.

The winner was "Željo moja" representing RTV Zagreb, written by Zrinko Tutić, and performed by Doris Dragović.

Jugovizija 1986 – 7 March 1986
R/O	Broadcaster	Artist	Song	Points	Place
1	RTV Zagreb	Novi fosili	"Boby br. 1"	52	2
2	RTV Pristina	Ferki Shala, Ivana Vitalić and Shermin Zaim	"Sve u svoje vreme"	11	14
3	RTV Ljubljana	Božidar Wolfand	"C'est la vie"	14	13
4	RTV Pristina	Violeta Rexhepagiq and Milica Milisavljević Dugalić	"Nora"	26	7
5	RTV Sarajevo	Hari Mata Hari	"U tvojoj kosi"	42	5
6	RTV Skopje	Seid Memić Vajta	"Sandra"	18	12
7	RTV Belgrade	Dado Topić	"Ljubav"	47	4
8	RTV Novi Sad	Lepa Brena	"Miki Mico"	20	10
9	RTV Ljubljana	Gu-gu	"Gugu gre v Hollywood"	39	6
10	RTV Skopje	Vermoment	"Bel gulabe"	10	15
11	RTV Sarajevo	Neda Ukraden	"Šaj, rode, šaj"	24	8
12	RTV Titograd	Daniel	"Peggy Sue"	19	11
13	RTV Zagreb	Doris Dragović	"Željo moja"	57	1
14	RTV Novi Sad	Denis & Denis	"Braća Grimm i Andersen"	51	3
15	RTV Titograd	Snježana Naumovska	"Ostani tu"	24	8
16	RTV Belgrade	Mira Beširević	"Ne idi"	10	15

Detailed Regional Jury Votes
R/O	Song	RTV Zagreb	RTV Pristina	RTV Ljubljana	RTV Sarajevo	RTV Skopje	RTV Belgrade	RTV Novi Sad	RTV Titograd	Total
1	"Boby br. 1"		7	10	3	6	8	8	10	52
2	"Sve u svoje vreme"	7		1			2	1		11
3	"C'est la vie"	2	3		1	3	4		1	14
4	"Nora"	12			2	7		3	2	26
5	"U tvojoj kosi"		8	5		2	10	10	7	42
6	"Sandra"	3	1	6	4				4	18
7	"Ljubav"	1	12	2	12	5		7	8	47
8	"Miki Mico"				5		3		12	20
9	"Gugu gre v Hollywood"	6	5		7	4	5	6	6	39
10	"Bel gulabe"	10								10
11	"Šaj, rode, šaj"		6	3		1	6	5	3	24
12	"Peggy Sue"	4		4		10	1			19
13	"Željo moja"		4	12	10	12	7	12		57
14	"Braća Grimm i Andersen"		10	8	8	8	12		5	51
15	"Ostani tu"	5	2	7	6			4		24
16	"Ne idi"	8						2		10

== At Eurovision ==
The contest was broadcast on several channels of JRT. The contest was broadcast on television on TV Beograd 1, TV Novi Sad, TV Sarajevo 1, TV Titograd 1, and TV Zagreb 1, all with commentary provided by Ksenija Urličić, as well as on TV Koper-Capodistria, TV Ljubljana 1, TV Prishtina, and TV Skopje 1. The contest was also broadcast on radio on Radio Ljubljana 2.

Dragović was the second performer on the night of the Contest, following Luxembourg and preceding France. At the close of the voting the song had received 49 points, placing 11th in a field of 20 competing countries. The Yugoslav jury awarded its 12 points to Turkey.

=== Voting ===
Points awarded to Yugoslavia
Score	Country
12 points	Cyprus
10 points	
8 points	
7 points	Netherlands; United Kingdom
6 points	
5 points	Iceland
4 points	Belgium
3 points	Ireland; Spain; Turkey
2 points	Luxembourg
1 point	Austria; Israel; Sweden

Points awarded by Yugoslavia
Score	Country
12 points	Turkey
10 points	Belgium
8 points	Ireland
7 points	Sweden
6 points	Switzerland
5 points	Luxembourg
4 points	Spain
3 points	Cyprus
2 points	Netherlands
1 point	Germany
