= Ah Bu Şarkıların Gözü Kör Olsun =

Studio album by Candan Erçetin
- Released: 25 November 2015
- Genre: Classical Turkish
- Length: 51:07
- Language: Turkish
- Label: Pasaj Müzik

Candan Erçetin chronology
Milyonlarca Kuştuk... (2013)	Ah Bu Şarkıların Gözü Kör Olsun (2015)

Ah Bu Şarkıların Gözü Kör Olsun (Oh, These Songs Should Black Out) is Candan Erçetin's eighth studio album released on 25 November 2015. The album is released to celebrate Erçetin's 20th year of career. Similar to Aman Doktor, which was released to mark the 10th anniversary of her career, this album contains covers of classical Turkish music.

The live version of "Unuttun Beni Zalim", recorded on 10 May 2015, was released as the first promotional single on 3 June 2015. "Ah Bu Şarkıların Gözü Kör Olsun" was released as the second promotional single on 26 August 2015.

== Track listing ==
#	Title	Translation	Lyricist	Composer	Time
1	"Ah Bu Şarkıların Gözü Kör Olsun"	Oh, these songs should black out	Şahin Çandır	Avni Anıl	4:38
2	"Silemezler Gönlümden"	(They) cannot erase from my heart	Arslan Tunçata	Selahattin Altınbaş	3:30
3	"Avuçlarımda Hala Sıcaklığın Var"	I still have your warmth in my palms	Yusuf Nalkesen		4:52
4	"Ben Gamlı Hazan"	I'm sorrowful autumn	Abdullah Sıtkı Angınbaş	Melahat Pars	2:57
5	"Ölürsem Yazıktır"	It's a pity if I die	Orhan Seyfi Orhon	Hayri Recep Yenigün	4:21
6	"Ne Senin Aşkına Muhtaç"	Neither in need for your love	Erol Sayan	Muzaffer İlkar	4:22
7	"Rüzgar Kırdı Dalımı"	Wind broke my branch	Fuat Edip Baksı	Selahattin Erköse	3:11
8	"Unuttun Beni Zalim"	You forgot me, cruel	Arif Sami Toker		3:27
9	"İçin İçin Yanıyor"	Burning from inside	Şekip Ayhan Özışık		3:07
10	"Karam"		Anonymous		2:44
11	"Erkilet Güzeli Bağlar Bozuyor"	The beauty of Erkilet harvests	Anonymous		3:19
12	"Pencere Açıldı Bilal Oğlan"	The window has opened, Bilal boy	Anonymous		3:45
13	"Vardar Ovası"	Vardar Plain	Anonymous		3:00
14	"Unuttun Beni Zalim" (Remix)	You forgot me, cruel	remix by Alper Erinç		3:46

== Release history ==
Country	Date	Format	Label
Turkey	25 November 2015	Compact disc	Pasaj Müzik
Turkey	25 November 2015	Digital download	Pasaj Müzik
Worldwide	25 November 2015	Digital download	Pasaj Müzik
