= Germany in the Eurovision Song Contest 1986 =

- Eurovision Song Contest 1986
- Participating broadcaster: ARD (Note: Arbeitsgemeinschaft der öffentlich-rechtlichen Rundfunkanstalten der Bundesrepublik Deutschland) – Bayerischer Rundfunk (BR)
- Country: Germany
- Selection process: Ein Lied für Bergen
- Selection date: 27 March 1986

Competing entry
- Song: "Über die Brücke geh'n"
- Artist: Ingrid Peters
- Songwriter: Hans Blum

Placement
- Final result: 8th, 62 points

Participation chronology

Germany was represented at the Eurovision Song Contest 1986 with the song "Über die Brücke geh'n", written by Hans Blum, and performed by Ingrid Peters. The German participating broadcaster on behalf of ARD, Bayerischer Rundfunk (BR), selected their entry through a national final.

== Before Eurovision ==
=== Ein Lied für Bergen ===
Bayerischer Rundfunk (BR) held the German national final, Ein Lied für Bergen, on 27 March at the Deutsches Theater in Munich, hosted by Sabrina Lallinger and Wenche Myhre. Myhre represented Germany in the 1968 Contest.

Twelve songs made it to the national final, which was broadcast by BR to ARD broadcasters across Germany. The winner was decided by a sampling of 500 random Germans who were meant to symbolize a fair representation of the country's population. Each person gave every song a vote, from 1 (for worst) to 12 (for best). Therefore, the theoretical "worst score" a song could receive would be 500, and the "best score" would be 6000.

The winning entry was "Über die Brücke geh'n", performed by Ingrid Peters and composed by Hans Blum.

R/O	Artist	Song	Songwriters	Votes	Place
1	That's Life	"Telefon"	Ralph Siegel; Werner Schüler	2,011	12
2	Günther-Eric Thöner	"Du bist der Wind, der meine Flügel trägt"	Günther-Eric Thöner; Erich Offierowski	2,893	9
3	Dschinghis Khan Family	"Wir gehör'n zusammen"	Ralph Siegel; Bernd Meinunger	4,088	2
4	Ingrid Peters	"Über die Brücke geh'n"	Hans Blum	4,236	1
5	Clowns	"Clowns"	Ralph Siegel; Michael Kunze; Bernd Meinunger	3,597	6
6	Steffi Hinz	"Ich habe niemals nie gesagt"	Alexander Gordan; Norbert Hammerschmidt	2,769	10
7	Mister Fisto	"Rein und klar wie's früher war"	Günther-Eric Thöner; Peter Rubin	2,102	11
8	Headline	"Europa"	Jürgen Triebel; Horst-Herbert Krause	3,871	5
9	Margit P.	"Der Sonne entgegen"	Margit Petraschka	2,923	8
10	Chris Heart and Band	"Die Engel sind auch nicht mehr das was sie war'n"	Ralph Siegel; Bernd Meinunger	4,027	3
11	Joy Fleming and Marc Berry	"Miteinander"	Reiner Pietsch; Werner Schüler	3,989	4
12	Tie Break	"Kopf oder Zahl"	Andreas Hofner; Regina Simon	3,118	7

== At Eurovision ==
Peters was the fourteenth performer on the night of the Contest, following Belgium and preceding Cyprus. At the close of the voting the song had received 62 points, placing 8th in a field of 20 competing countries. The German jury awarded its 12 points to Luxembourg.

The contest was broadcast on Erstes Deutsches Fernsehen, with commentary by Ado Schlier. The show was watched by 10.88 million viewers in Germany.

=== Voting ===
Points awarded to Germany
Score	Country
12 points	United Kingdom
10 points	
8 points	Austria; Ireland; Luxembourg
7 points	Belgium; Denmark
6 points	
5 points	Sweden
4 points	Portugal
3 points	
2 points	Finland
1 point	Yugoslavia

Points awarded by Germany
Score	Country
12 points	Luxembourg
10 points	Netherlands
8 points	Turkey
7 points	Denmark
6 points	Norway
5 points	United Kingdom
4 points	Sweden
3 points	Finland
2 points	Austria
1 point	Belgium
