= Switzerland in the Eurovision Song Contest 1986 =

- Eurovision Song Contest 1986
- Participating broadcaster: Swiss Broadcasting Corporation (SRG SSR)
- Country: Switzerland
- Selection process: Concours Eurovision de la Chanson 1986
- Selection date: 25 January 1986

Competing entry
- Song: "Pas pour moi"
- Artist: Daniela Simons
- Songwriters: Atilla Şereftuğ; Nella Martinetti

Placement
- Final result: 2nd, 140 points

Participation chronology

Switzerland was represented at the Eurovision Song Contest 1986 with the song "Pas pour moi", composed by Atilla Şereftuğ, with lyrics by Nella Martinetti, and performed by Daniela Simons. The Swiss participating broadcaster, the Swiss Broadcasting Corporation (SRG SSR), selected its entry for the contest through a national final.

== Before Eurovision ==
=== Regional selections ===
The Swiss Broadcasting Corporation (SRG SSR) held a national final to select its entry for the Eurovision Song Contest 1986. The broadcaster had its divisions independently use their own selection methods, which would end with a final round featuring all of the songs selected by each regional division.

Swiss-French broadcaster Télévision suisse romande (TSR) and Swiss Italian broadcaster Televisione svizzera di lingua italiana (TSI) internally selected their entries, while Swiss German and Romansh broadcaster Schweizer Fernsehen der deutschen und rätoromanischen Schweiz (SF DRS) held a preliminary round to select its songs, with Schweizer Radio: Radio der deutschen und rätoromanischen Schweiz (SR DRS) holding a separate selection to enter a Romansh song to this preliminary round. Eligible songs were required to have been composed by songwriters from Switzerland or Liechtenstein, and the deadline for the song registration was on 15 October.

=== German-Romansh preliminary round ===
==== Festival dalla Musica Romontscha ====
SR DRS held a selection to enter a Romansh song in the German-Romansh preliminary round. The first edition of Festival dalla Musica Romontscha was not related to Eurovision, but the second edition, which was held from 12–17 August 1985 at the Circus Nock Tent in Disentis, selected an entry for the preliminary round. Nineteen groups participated. The winner is presumed to have been Linard Bardill and Shefali Banerjee.

Among the other participating groups were Alexi & Marcus with their song "Il clom dalla Greina", Retuorn 85, Remedy, Prisma, and Hades.

==== Ein Lied für Norwegen - Ausscheidungen für den Concours Eurovision de la Chanson 1986 ====
SF DRS held its preliminary round on 14 December 1985. About 80 songs were submitted, with nine songs being selected, to which the Romansh song was added, forming a lineup of ten total songs. Radio listeners of DRS1 submitted their votes via phone call.

Three songs advanced to the Swiss final, including the Romansh entry, becoming the first Romansh song to qualify to a Swiss national final. Known information is listed in the chart below. Among the competing acts was "Mit Musik bin ich niemals allein" written by Hazy Osterwald and Günter Loose and sung by Anetta Philip, which later went on to compete in the Swiss national final again in 1987.

Ein Lied für Norwegen - Ausscheidungen für den Concours Eurovision de la Chanson 1986 — 14 December 1985
Artist(s)	Song	Songwriter(s)		Result
Artist(s)	Song	Composer	Lyricist	Result
Anetta Philip	"Mit Musik bin ich niemals allein"	Hazy Osterwald	Günter Loose	—N/a
Beatrice Wälle	"Das war mein schönster Kindertraum"	Unknown		—N/a
Benedict Stecher	"Rumantsch"	Unknown		—N/a
Chris Lorenz	"Es kommen andere Tage"	Unknown		—N/a
Chris Lorenz	"Heute Nacht sind wir allein"	Unknown		—N/a
Lily Lilas	"Lily Lilas"	Véronique Müller	Dodo Hug; Véronique Müller	Qualified
Linard Bardill and Shefali Banerjee	"Tragnölin"	Linard Bardill		Qualified
Nöggi	"Verschänk doch dini Liebi"	Steve Ray	Rosita Rengel	Qualified
Swiss Singers	"Ein Leben ohne dich"	Unknown		—N/a
Swiss Singers	"Ein paar Träume"	Ralph Ottinger		—N/a

=== Italian internal selection ===
On 6 November, TSI held an internal selection. A committee had selected the songs— "Amore mio" by Paolo Monte, "Iside" by Gruppa Pocafera, and "Un amore come una fiaba" by Simonetta. Details on the other submissions are unknown, including the artists, titles, and number of total submissions.

=== French internal selection ===
TSR held an internal selection at the end of 1985. About 300 songs were submitted and presented to a committee. On 13 December 1985, it was first reported that the three selected songs were "Fou d'amour pour toujours" by Scarlet, "Generation liberté" by the group Test, and "Pas pour moi" by Daniela Simons.

=== Concours Eurovision de la Chanson 1986 ===
SF DRS staged the national final on 25 January 1986 at 21:15 CET, at its studios in Zurich. It was hosted by singer Paola del Medico, who had represented Switzerland in 1969 and 1980, with the Gipsy Line Dancers making a guest appearance. Nine songs competed in the national final, with three songs in French and Italian, two in German, and one in Romansh. Among the participants was Véronique Müller, who had represented Switzerland in 1972, and competed here as a member of Lily Lilas.

Participating entries
Broadcaster	Artist(s)	Song	Songwriter(s)		Language
Broadcaster	Artist(s)	Song	Composer	Lyricist(s)	Language
RTSI	Simonetta	"Un amore come una fiaba"	Mario Robbiani		Italian
RTSI	Gruppo Pocafera	"Iside"	Andi Netzer		Italian
RTSI	Paolo Monte	"Amore mio"	Nella Martinetti		Italian
SF DRS	Nöggi	"Verschänk doch dini Liebi"	Steve Ray	Rosita Rengel	German
SF DRS	Linard Bardill and Shefali Banerjee	"Tragnölin"	Linard Bardill		Romansh
SF DRS	Lily Lilas	"Lily Lilas"	Véronique Müller	Dodo Hug; Véronique Müller	German, French, Italian
TSR	Scarlet	"Fou d'amour pour toujours"	Clarie-Lise Harris	Tom Dorche	French
TSR	Test	"Generation liberté"	Marc Olivier	Jean-Marie Rolle	French
TSR	Daniela Simons	"Pas pour moi"	Atilla Şereftuğ	Nella Martinetti	French

The voting consisted of regional public votes which were sent to the three divisions of SRG SSR (SF DRS, TSR, TSI: German-Romansh, French, and Italian speaking, respectively), a press jury, and an "expert" jury. The winner was the song "Pas pour moi", composed by Atilla Şereftuğ with lyrics from Nella Martinetti and performed by Daniela Simons.

Final — 23 January 1986
R/O	Artist(s)	Song	Regional Juries			Press Jury	Expert Jury	Total	Place
R/O	Artist(s)	Song	DRS	TSR	TSI	Press Jury	Expert Jury	Total	Place
1	Scarlet	"Fou d'amour pour toujours"	5	8	6	6	8	33	3
2	Nöggi	"Verschänk doch dini Liebi"	4	1	2	3	1	11	9
3	Simonetta	"Un amore come una fiaba"	3	3	4	4	4	18	6
4	Test	"Generation liberté"	6	7	7	5	2	27	5
5	Linard Bardill and Shefali Banerjee	"Tragnölin"	7	5	5	7	6	30	4
6	Gruppo Pocafera	"Iside"	1	2	3	1	7	14	7
7	Lily Lilas	"Lily Lilas"	2	4	1	2	5	14	7
8	Paolo Monte	"Amore mio"	8	6	10	8	3	35	2
9	Daniela Simons	"Pas pour moi"	10	10	8	10	10	48	1

== At Eurovision ==
At the Eurovision Song Contest 1986, held at the Grieghallen in Bergen, the Swiss entry was the tenth entry of the night following Spain and preceding Israel. The Swiss conductor at the contest was Atilla Şereftuğ, who composed the song. At the close of voting, Switzerland had received 140 points in total; finishing in second place out of nineteen countries, marking their highest score since 1982 and the third time they finished second.

=== Voting ===
Each participating broadcaster assembled a jury panel with at least eleven members. The jurors awarded 1-8, 10, and 12 points to their top ten songs.

Points awarded to Switzerland
Score	Country
12 points	Belgium; Israel; Luxembourg; Netherlands; Sweden
10 points	Ireland; Portugal; Turkey
8 points	
7 points	Finland; France
6 points	Yugoslavia
5 points	Cyprus; Norway; United Kingdom
4 points	Austria; Denmark; Spain
3 points	Iceland
2 points	
1 point	

Points awarded by Switzerland
Score	Country
12 points	Sweden
10 points	Belgium
8 points	Turkey
7 points	France
6 points	Norway
5 points	Israel
4 points	United Kingdom
3 points	Denmark
2 points	Luxembourg
1 point	Spain
