= Spain in the Eurovision Song Contest 1986 =

- Eurovision Song Contest 1986
- Participating broadcaster: Televisión Española (TVE)
- Country: Spain
- Selection process: Internal selection
- Announcement date: Artist: 27 February 1986

Competing entry
- Song: "Valentino"
- Artist: Cadillac
- Songwriter: José María Guzmán

Placement
- Final result: 10th, 51 points

Participation chronology

Spain was represented at the Eurovision Song Contest 1986 with the song "Valentino", written by José María Guzmán, and performed by the band Cadillac. The Spanish participating broadcaster, Televisión Española (TVE), internally selected its entry for the contest. The song, performed in position 9, placed tenth out of twenty competing entries with 51 points.

== Before Eurovision ==
Televisión Española (TVE) internally selected "Valentino" performed by Cadillac as its entry for the Eurovision Song Contest 1986. The members of the band were José María Guzmán, Pedro Agustín Sánchez, and Daniel Jacques Louis. The song was written by Guzmán himself. The name of the song, the songwriter and performers were announced on 27 February 1986.

=== Song ===
"Valentino" is an up-tempo number with influences from synthpop, in which the protagonist describes his attempts to attract a woman. He describes the drinks and the atmosphere in the room of a hotel in Madrid for a good night. The song simultaneously serves as an ode to Italian film star Rudolph Valentino, often referred to as the original "Latin lover" – "couldn't have done it better...". The protagonist looks up to Valentino's charms and wants to "be the protagonist of his films". Cadillac also recorded an English version of the song under the same title.

== At Eurovision ==
On 3 May 1986, the Eurovision Song Contest was held at the Grieghallen in Bergen, Norway, hosted by Norsk rikskringkasting (NRK), and broadcast live throughout the continent. Cadillac performed "Valentino" the ninth on the evening, following Turkey and preceding Switzerland. Eduardo Leiva conducted the event's orchestra performance of the Spanish entry. At the end of voting, "Valentino" received a total of 51 points, placing tenth out of a field of 20 competing entries.

TVE broadcast the contest in Spain on TVE 2 with commentary by Antonio Gómez Mateo. Before the event, TVE aired a talk show hosted by Marisa Naranjo introducing the Spanish jury, which continued after the contest commenting on the results.

=== Voting ===
TVE assembled a jury panel with eleven members. The following members comprised the Spanish jury:

- Emilio Aragón – showman
- Blanca Fernández Ochoa – ski racer
- Rafi Camino – bullfighter
- José María Tío – imaging technician
- Carolina Conejero – student
- Rosario Cabanas – jockey
- Marta Cantón – rhythmic gymnast
- María Cuadra – actress
- Javier Escrivá – actor
- Antonio Imízcoz – journalist
- Pablo Pérez Royo – hairdresser

The jury was chaired by César Gil. The jury awarded its maximum of 12 points to Ireland.

Points awarded to Spain
Score	Country
12 points	
10 points	
8 points	Turkey
7 points	Austria; Luxembourg
6 points	France
5 points	Ireland
4 points	Yugoslavia
3 points	Belgium; Denmark; Portugal
2 points	Iceland
1 point	Finland; Switzerland; United Kingdom

Points awarded by Spain
Score	Country
12 points	Ireland
10 points	Belgium
8 points	Portugal
7 points	Sweden
6 points	Iceland
5 points	Denmark
4 points	Switzerland
3 points	Yugoslavia
2 points	United Kingdom
1 point	Netherlands
