= Norway in the Eurovision Song Contest 1986 =

- Eurovision Song Contest 1986
- Participating broadcaster: Norsk rikskringkasting (NRK)
- Country: Norway
- Selection process: Melodi Grand Prix 1986
- Selection date: 22 March 1986

Competing entry
- Song: "Romeo"
- Artist: Ketil Stokkan
- Songwriter: Ketil Stokkan

Placement
- Final result: 12th, 44 points

Participation chronology

Norway was represented at the Eurovision Song Contest 1986 with the song "Romeo", written and performed by Ketil Stokkan. The Norwegian participating broadcaster, Norsk rikskringkasting (NRK), selected its entry through the Melodi Grand Prix 1986. In addition, NRK was also the host broadcaster and staged the event at the Grieghallen in Bergen, after winning the previous edition with the song "La det swinge" by Bobbysocks.

== Before Eurovision ==
=== Melodi Grand Prix 1986 ===
Norsk rikskringkasting (NRK) held the Melodi Grand Prix 1986 on 22 March 1986 at the Stavanger Forum convention center in Stavanger, hosted by actor Jarl Goli. The band was conducted by Fred Nøddelund.

Ten songs competed with the winner being decided by four regional juries (Oslo, Lillehammer, Trondheim and Vadsø), a press jury composed of newspaper, radio and television journalists, the inhabitants of the Statfjord A oil rig in the North Sea and the studio audience in Stavanger.

The winning entry was "Romeo", composed and performed by Ketil Stokkan.

R/O	Artist	Song	Songwriter(s)	Points	Place
1	Susanne Fuhr	"Hollywood"	Dag Arnesen; Arne Lindtner Næss	27	8
2	Ketil Stokkan	"Romeo"	Ketil Stokkan	70	1
3	Creation	"Ny tid"	Per Kristian Indrehus; Geir Olav Bøkestad	42	5
4	Frank Aleksandersen	"Stille før stormen"	Frank Aleksandersen	30	7
5	Anne-Marie Giørtz	"Tilbake"	Kristian Lindeman; Jan Eggum	22	10
6	Jørn Hoel and Band	"Inkululeko"	David Chocron	59	2
7	Claudia Scott and Band	"Rock 'n' Roll Band"	Claudia Scott; Torstein Flakne; Casino Steel	38	6
8	Alex and Band	"Fri"	Alex; Atle Bakken; Cato Kyvik	26	9
9	Mia Gundersen	"Jeg vet hva jeg vil"	Per Røise	45	4
10	Nina Askeland	"Boulevard"	Svein Dag Hauge; Jan Eggum	47	3

Detailed Voting Breakdown
R/O	Song	Regional Juries				Press Jury	Oil Rig	Studio Audience	Total
R/O	Song	Oslo	Lillehammer	Trondheim	Vadsø	Press Jury	Oil Rig	Studio Audience	Total
1	"Hollywood"	6	3	5	4	1	3	5	27
2	"Romeo"	8	12	12	12	10	6	10	70
3	"Ny tid"	7	8	2	8	7	4	6	42
4	"Stille før stormen"	2	4	8	2	4	8	2	30
5	"Tilbake"	3	6	3	1	3	2	4	22
6	"Inkululeko"	10	7	6	7	12	5	12	59
7	"Rock 'n' Roll Band"	1	1	10	10	8	7	1	38
8	"Fri"	12	2	1	5	2	1	3	26
9	"Jeg vet hva jeg vil"	4	5	7	6	5	10	8	45
10	"Boulevard"	5	10	4	3	6	12	7	47

== At Eurovision ==
Stokkan performed fourth on the night of the contest, following France and preceding the United Kingdom. At the close of the voting the song had received 44 points, placing 12th in a field of 20 competing countries.

=== Voting ===
Points awarded to Norway
Score	Country
12 points	
10 points	
8 points	
7 points	
6 points	Cyprus; Germany; Ireland; Switzerland
5 points	Belgium; Denmark
4 points	France; Iceland
3 points	
2 points	Netherlands
1 point	

Points awarded by Norway
Score	Country
12 points	Luxembourg
10 points	Denmark
8 points	Belgium
7 points	Sweden
6 points	United Kingdom
5 points	Switzerland
4 points	Portugal
3 points	France
2 points	Ireland
1 point	Israel
