= Neden (Candan Erçetin album) =

Studio album by Candan Erçetin
- Released: May 4, 2002
- Genre: Pop
- Label: Topkapı Müzik
- Producer: Rıza Erekli

Candan Erçetin chronology
Elbette (2000)	Neden (2002)	Chante Hier Pour Aujourd'hui (2003)

Neden (Why?) is Candan Erçetin's fourth studio album. It was released in May 2002. This album had significant differences with her previous works, as she was no longer working with Mete Özgencil. Instead, the album has songs mostly written by herself and Aylin Atalay. She proved her success in music-writing as well as performing. The CD version of the album has a cover with fragrance, the first of its kind in Turkey.

== Track listing ==
	Title	English title	Writer(s)	Composer(s)	Length
1	"Hayırsız"	Scapegrace	Candan Erçetin	Macedon anonymous	4:31
2	"Neden"	Why?	Candan Erçetin	anonymous^{[A]}	4:02
3	"Gamsız Hayat"	Carefree life	Aylin Atalay & Candan Erçetin	Candan Erçetin	3:50
4	"Parçalandım"	I break into pieces	Candan Erçetin	Alper Erinç & Candan Erçetin	3:57
5	"Anlatma Sakın"	Don't tell	Sinan	Candan Erçetin	3:36
6	"Bensiz"	Without me	Sinan	Neslihan Engin & Candan Erçetin	3:17
7	"Yapayalnız"	Very lonely	Aylin Atalay	Candan Erçetin	4:13
8	"Mühim Değil"	It's OK.	Sinan	Neslihan Engin & Candan Erçetin	4:13
9	"Ben Böyleyim"	This is the way I am	Ümit Aksu	Armando Manzanero	3:44
10	"Korkarım"	I'm afraid	Aylin Atalay	Candan Erçetin & Neslihan Engin	3:17
11	"Dünya Hali"	Nature of world	Candan Erçetin		3:37
12	"Yüksek Yüksek Tepelere"	To high hills	anonymous		4:08

== Personnel ==
- Topkapı Müzik – production
- Rıza Erekli – producer
- Candan Erçetin – vocals, songwriter, composer, drums, goblet drum, Turkish tambur
- Alper Erinç – composer, arranger, drums, guitar, mandolin, trumpet, Pro Tools editing
- Aylin Atalay – songwriter
- Sinan – songwriter
- Ümit Aksu – songwriter
- Bülent Erinç – arranger
- Neslihan Engin – composer, arranger, tambur, production assistant
- Özgür Buldum – arranger
- Tansel Doğanay – arranger, accordion
- Özcan Şenyaylar – accordion, violin, bowed string instrument composition
- Muzaffer Şenyaylar – qanun
- Şenyaylar Grubu – bowed string instruments
- Günay Uysal – cello
- Mustafa Süder – violin
- Kirpi Bülent – clarinet
- Hüsnü Şenlendirici – clarinet
- Ali Yılmaz – cümbüş
- Tolga Görsev – drums, tambur, vocals, recording (all except "Ben Böyleyim")
- Başar Yakupoğlu – recording assistant (all except "Ben Böyleyim")
- Nihal Bilgen – recording assistant (all except "Ben Böyleyim")
- Gürsan Acar (Tomwelt Studios, Berlin) – mastering
- Cengiz Ercümer – goblet drum
- Can Şengün – guitar
- Murat Ejder – guitar
- Murat Matthew Erdem – recording
- Seyfi Ayta – tambur, daf
- Erkut Gökgöz – trumpet
- Bozkurt Bayer – art director
- Hakan Aydoğan – photography
- Hakan Köse Difference – hair, make-up
- Ali Özel – hair, make-up
- Kerime Tekin – hair, make-up
- Onur Ofset – printing

Credits adapted from Neden's album booklet.

== Release history ==
Country	Date	Format	Label
Turkey	04 May 2002	CD · cassette · digital download	Topkapı Müzik
Worldwide	04 May 2002	Digital download	Topkapı Müzik

== Notes ==
- A On the album's cover, it is mentioned that the composer of the second song, "Neden", is anonymous, however, the composers are in fact Attie Bauw and Yulduz Usmonova. The composition was first used in Usmonova's 1999 album Dünya (1999) for the song "Deme".
