= Unut Sevme =

Single by Candan Erçetin

from the album Elbette
- Released: July 2001
- Genre: Pop
- Label: Topkapı Music
- Songwriter(s): Baki Çallıoğlu (tr)

"Unut Sevme" (English: Forget, Don't Love) is Turkish singer Candan Erçetin's first single. It was released as a limited number of 2500 copies, of which all signed by her. The song is written by Baki Çallıoğlu and previously sung by Güzide Kasacı during 1960s.

== Track listing ==
1. "Album Version" - 4:38
2. "Funky House Mix (Radio Edit)" - 5:03
3. "Afro-Orient Percussion Mix (Radio Mix)" - 4:12
4. "Latin House Mix (Radio Edit)" - 4:35
5. "Funky House Mix (Extended Version)" - 5:48
6. "Afro-Orient Percussion Mix (Extended Version)" - 5:35
7. "Latin House Mix (Extended Version)" - 7:49
