= Maureen Darbyshire =

English actress

- Born: c. 1952
- Occupation: Actress

Maureen Darbyshire (born c.1952) is an English actress who appeared in six out of the seven series of Rumpole of the Bailey as Chambers Secretary at 1 Equity Court; and also appeared in other roles on television.

Darbyshire gave up acting in 1980 and became a lyricist.
