= Aman Doktor =

Studio album by Candan Erçetin
- Released: 2005
- Genre: Pop
- Length: 54:41
- Label: DMC
- Producer: Dünya Müzik; Tolga Gorsev

Candan Erçetin chronology
Remix'5 (2005)	Aman Doktor (2005)	Kırık Kalpler Durağında (2009)

Aman Doktor ('Oh! Doctor') is Turkish singer-songwriter Candan Erçetin's seventh studio album. It released in 2005, around the tenth year of the singer's public career. The album is a compilation and partial rearrangement of popular folk songs common to Turkish and Greek cultures, sung in both languages, and represents a culmination of the efforts of Erçetin as a friendship envoy to these two countries.

== Track listing ==
#	Name	Length	Producers	
#	Name	Length	Turkish	Greek
1	Aman Doktor - Ο γιατρος	5:51	anonymous	anonymous
2	Bir Dalda İki Kiraz / Sallasana Sallasana - Σαλα σαλα	4:27	anonymous	anonymous
3	Darıldın Mı Gülüm Bana - Χαρικλακι	4:06	anonymous	written by Panayiotis Tundas
4	İndim Havuz Başına v.1 - Τι τα θελεισ τα λεφτα	4:35	anonymous	written by Vassilis Papadopulos
5	Küçük Yaşta Aldım Sazı Elime - Με το σαζι μου στα χερια	4:36	anonymous	anonymous, lyrics by Sophia Kompotiati
6	Zeytinyağlı Yiyemem Aman - Γιατι θες να φύγεις	3:19	anonymous	lyrics by Kostas Virvos, music by Stratos Attalidis
7	Telgrafın Tellerine Kuşlar Mı Konar - Αεροπλανο θα παρω [featuring Stelyo Berber]	3:35	anonymous	written by Panayiotis Tundas
8	Ada sahillerinde bekliyorum - Ματια μου, ματια μου	4:21	anonymous	anonymous
9	Kadifeden Kesesi - Καδιφης	3:20	anonymous	anonymous
10	Kalenin Bedenleri - Σηκω χορεψε κουκλι μου	4:04	anonymous	music anonymous, lyrics by Stelyos Kazantzidis
11	İzmir'in Kavakları - Τζακιτζις	4:37	anonymous	anonymous
12	Çadırımın Üstüne/Sürüverin Cezveler Kaynasın	4:22	anonymous	lyrics and music by Yiannis Papaiyoannu
13	İndim Havuz Başına v.2 - Τι τα θελεις τα λεφτα	3:28	anonymous	written by Vassilis Papadopulos
