= Milyonlarca Kuştuk... =

Studio album by Candan Erçetin
- Released: 3 June 2013
- Recorded: 2012–2013
- Genre: Pop · folk
- Length: 66:34
- Label: Pasaj
- Producer: Candan Erçetin

Candan Erçetin chronology
Aranjman 2011 (2011)	Milyonlarca Kuştuk... (2013)	Ah Bu Şarkıların Gözü Kör Olsun (2015)

Milyonlarca Kuştuk... (We Were Millions of Birds...) is the seventh studio album by Turkish singer Candan Erçetin. It was released on 3 June 2013 by Pasaj Müzik. It was Erçetin's first major work since the 2011 release of Aranjman 2011, and her first studio album after Kırık Kalpler Durağında (2009). It is a pop album, and like Erçetin's previous works contains elements of Balkan music.

Milyonlarca Kuştuk... was recorded and produced over the course of 12 months, and has 15 songs in total. Erçetin was the album's main songwriter and wrote nine of its songs on her own. The album also features the songs "Yaralı Gönlüm", originally performed by Zeki Müren, and "Herkes Gibisin", based on a poem by Nâzım Hikmet. The two songs were recomposed and performed by Erçetin. The album's first song and music video, "Milyonlarca Kuştuk...", is based on the legend of Simurgh and discusses the falling of human soul into the worldly traps and losing its way. Music critics gave the album positive reviews in general..

The promotion for the album was postponed due to Taksim Gezi Park protests and it was initially promoted only on the singer's official website and on the website of its production company. The album topped the list of best-selling albums in Turkey and sold 50,000 physical copies in the year it was released. In the album's booklet, Erçetin mentioned that Milyonlarca Kuştuk... was her last album to be released in CD format.

== Background and release ==
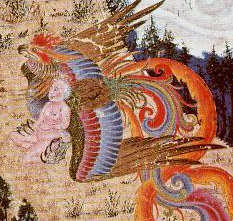
The album's lead single, "Milyonlarca Kuştuk...", was titled after the legend of Simurgh.

After releasing her sixth studio album, Kırık Kalpler Durağında, in 2009, Erçetin continued her career by releasing a series of cover songs in July 2011, under the title Aranjman 2011. The preparations for her seventh studio album began in the summer months of 2011. The production phase lasted for 8 months, after which she started working with Alper Erinç in the studio and recordings were done after 12 months.

On 3 June 2013, Candan Erçetin's seventh studio album, Milyonlarca Kuştuk..., was released by Pasaj Müzik. It's a pop album with 14 new songs, nine of which were written solely by Erçetin, and the fifth song, "Aşk", was written by her and Redd's lead vocalist Doğan Duru. Just like her previous albums, rhythms of Balkan music were used in this work as well. The album's lead single "Milyonlarca Kuştuk...", is titled after the legend of Simurgh. In the song, it is told how human's soul loses its way because of eagerness, greed and jealousy, and in the legend it goes on a mission to find Simurgh, but it faces many worldly barriers. In the album, Anna Vissi's song "Sigxaritiria" is turned into Turkish under the name "Güle Güle", as well as Ella Fitzgerald's "Bei Mir Bist Du Schön" which was performed by Erçetin in Turkish with the new title "Eğlen Neşelen". The Turkish version of "Misirlou", which was performed by Zeki Müren in the 1950s under the title "Yaralı Gönlüm", was re-performed by Erçetin and included in the album. On the songs "Dalga" and "Yak Gemileri" old compositions by Sorinel Pustiu were used. Nâzım Hikmet's poem, "Herkes Gibisin", was composed into a song and performed by Erçetin. The album's release accidentally fell on the same date as the fiftieth anniversary of Hikmet's death. As a result of the "desire to establish a link between the legacy of the past and the music of today", she prepared the ghazal for "Herkes Gibisin" together with Veysel Samanoğlu.

In the album's booklet, Candan Erçetin mentioned that Milyonlarca Kuştuk... would be her last album that was going to be released in CD format. In her note, she wrote: "I'm afraid this is the last album we're releasing together with a CD record. The world is changing, so is Turkey, and so is the technology, and we are left with no options but to adapt to new changes. I will not give up on singing songs, crying, laughing, and living in short. Because singing with you gives strength to my soul, it makes me feel alive and lightens my loneliness. Then someday, somehow, we are going to meet again."

Milyonlarca Kuştuk... ranked first on the list of best-selling albums in Turkey. According to MÜ-YAP, the album sold 50,000 physical copies by the end of 2013 and became the fifth best-selling album of the year. With 54,790 downloads on digital platforms, it became the tenth most-downloaded album of the year. The number of sales for the album was 104,790 altogether. The promotions for the album were postponed due to the Taksim Gezi Park protests and it was initially only promoted on the singer's official website and the website of its production company. Later, in a note sent with the album's copies to a close circle of musicians, Erçetin said:

"Hello. We released the album Milyonlarca Kuştuk... on Monday 3 June 2013, just as we had planned a long time ago, but as our country is passing through stormy days and to not to take attentions away, we did not want to do the main promotion in any platforms other than candanercetin.com.tr and pasajmuzik.com. Our hearts did not let us do it. But I wish to see this album in your archives just like the other ones. Yours affectionately, Candan."

== Critical reception ==
Milyonlarca Kuştuk... received generally positive reviews from critics. Hürriyet's Cengiz Semercioğlu gave a positive review for the album, and wrote that he was able to see three different sides of Erçetin in the album: Entertaining Candan (in the songs "Eğlen Neşelen", "Kim Deli", "Dalga", "Yak Gemileri" and "Yaralı Gönlüm"), Sad Candan (in the songs "Aşk", "Beklemeden", "Sen" and "Herkes Gibisin") and Lonely Candan (in the songs "Milyonlarca Kuştuk...", "Yağmur", "Güle Güle", "Yalnızlık" and "Hafif"). He mentioned that the songs grew more and more beautiful as one listened to them repeatedly, and named the acoustic version of "Sen" as his favorite song in the album. In conclusion, he wrote that the singer had managed to both entertain and sadden her audience. Sadi Tirak from the same newspaper described the album as Erçetin's worst album to date and wrote that he had faced the album with great disappointment. He also did not find the songs "Milyonlarca Kuştuk...", "Eğlen Neşelen", "Kim Deli", "Dalga", "Yak Gemileri" and "Yaralı Gönlüm" suitable for Erçetin, and believed that they should have been given to Nil Karaibrahimgil. Radikal's Arda Savcı wrote in his repertoire that the album was consisted of proper songs that would not mislead the listeners. However, he noted that a little minimalism would not be bad in the lyrics, and named the songs "Milyonlarca Kuştuk...", ‘"Aşk", "Eğlen Neşelen" and "Yak Gemileri" as the starred pieces of the album. Sabah's Fecir Alptekin liked all of the album's songs and described Erçetin as a "bard-musician". He found the song "Beklemeden", which he described as the star of the album, as a competitor to Kırık Kalpler Durağında's "Bahar" "in terms of the effect and enthusiasm that it creates". Milliyet Sanat's Yavuz Hakan Tok wrote that the album was exactly something that was expected from Erçetin and believed that with this work she had succeeded in securing her place in people's hearts. He found the ghazal at the beginning of "Herkes Gibisin" impressive, and believed that "Kim Deli" with its makeshift lyrics was the weakest piece in the album. He also mentioned that the song "Milyonlarca Kuştuk..." with its content was somehow talking about the resistance at the Taksim Gezi Park protests.

== Music videos ==
Candan Erçetin postponed the promotions for Milyonlarca Kuştuk... due to the Taksim Gezi Park protests. The album's first music video was made for the song "Milyonlarca Kuştuk...". The video was recorded at the Maçka Park in Istanbul and 80 of Erçetin's young students from Sait Çiftçi Primary School and Minik Yıldızlar Kindergarten appeared alongside her. It was recorded over the course of nine hours and directed by the album's visual director Bozkurt Bayer. The music video was first released on 21 November 2013. The second music video, "Herkes Gibisin", was made using the footage from one of Erçetin's concerts and released on 29 June 2015.

== Track listing ==
No.	Title	Writer(s)	Composer(s)	Length
1.	"Milyonlarca Kuştuk..."	Candan Erçetin	Erçetin	4:30
2.	"Yağmur"	Erçetin	Nuri Irmak	4:42
3.	"Güle Güle"	Erçetin	Karvelas Nikolaos	5:05
4.	"Yalnızlık"	Erçetin	Erçetin	4:07
5.	"Aşk"	Doğan Duru · Erçetin	Duru	4:13
6.	"Beklemeden"	Erçetin	Erçetin	4:39
7.	"Sen"	Sinan	Erçetin · Alper Erinç · Irmak	3:58
8.	"Hafif"	Aylin Atalay	Jürgen Heusser	3:45
9.	"Eğlen Neşelen"	Erçetin	Sholom Sholem Secunda	4:08
10.	"Kim Deli"	Erçetin	Erçetin · Erinç	3:53
11.	"Dalga"	Erçetin	Sorinel Pustiu	4:02
12.	"Yak Gemileri"	Erçetin	Pustiu	4:27
13.	"Yaralı Gönlüm"	Recep Suat Sayın	Nicolas Roubanis	4:24
14.	"Herkes Gibisin"	Nazım Hikmet Ran	Erçetin	6:18
15.	"Sen" (Acoustic)	Sinan	Erçetin · Erinç · Irmak	3:38
Total length:				66:34

Notes

- The opening of "Herkes Gibisin" contains improvised lyrics that were prepared by Candan Erçetin and Veysel Samanoğlu.

== Personnel ==
- Dünya Müzik – producer
- Pasaj Müzik – production
- Candan Erçetin – producer, singer, songwriter, composer
- Alper Erinç – composer, arranger, mixing, guitar, double bass, mandolin
- Nuri Irmak – composer, piano
- Karvelas Nikolaos – composer
- Doğan Duru – songwriter, composer
- Sinan – songwriter
- Aylin Atalay – songwriter
- Sholom Sholem Secunda – composer
- Sorinel Pustiu – composer
- Jürgen Heusser – composer
- Mehmet Akatay – percussion
- Veysel Samanlıoğlu – viloin, electro midi violin, improvised lyrics
- Tamer Karaoğlu – accordion, keyboard
- Talat Karaoğlu – clarinet
- Göksun Çavdar – wind instruments group
- Erkut Gökgöz – wind instruments group, flugelhorn
- Hasan Gözetlik – wind instruments group
- Gündem – bowed string instruments group
- Mustafa Süder – solo violin, alto soprano saxophone
- Selahattin Güzelel – guitar, flamenco guitar
- Meltem Tulukçu – choir member
- İpek Kutbay – choir member
- Seda Aksak – choir member
- Deniz Pamuk – choir member
- Deniz Pamukoğlu – choir member
- H. Buğra Kunt – recording, Pro Tools editing
- Çağlar Türkmen – mastering
- Meltem Tulukçu – project coordinator
- Bozkurt Bayer – visual director
- Muhsin Akgün – photographs

Credits adapted from Milyonlarca Kuştuk...'s album booklet.

== Charts ==
Chart (2013)	Peak position
Turkey (D&R Best-Selling Albums)	1

== Sales ==
Country	Sales
Turkey (MÜ-YAP)	50,000

== Release history ==
Country	Date	Format	Label
Turkey	3 June 2013	CD · digital download	Pasaj Müzik
Worldwide	3 June 2013	Digital download	Pasaj Müzik
