= Seyyal Taner =

Turkish singer and actress (born 1952)

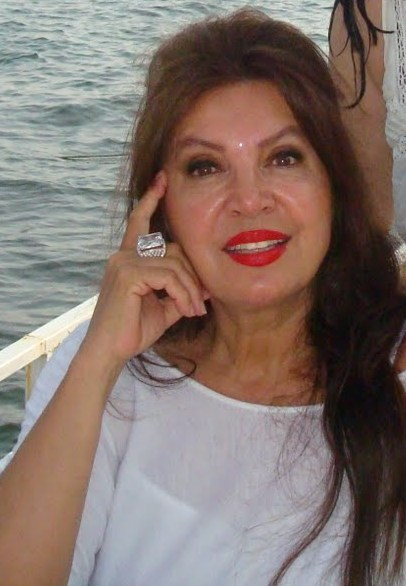
- Seyyal Taner in 2010

Background information
- Born: September 28, 1952 (age 74); Şanlıurfa, Turkey
- Genres: Pop, rock, dance, schlager
- Occupations: Singer-songwriter, actress
- Years active: 1968–present
- Labels: Bir Numara (1974–1975); Yavuz Plak (1976–1986); Güneş (1991–1993); Elenor Plak (2002–2009); Majör Müzik (2012)

Seyyal Taner (born September 28, 1952) is a Turkish singer and actress.

== Early life ==
Taner was born in Şanlıurfa, Turkey, and later moved to Istanbul with her family. She graduated from the Amerikan Kız Lisesi. She received vocal training from Şerif Yüzbaşıoğlu in 1965 and started to sing as an amateur with the Kanat Gür Orkestrası.

== Career ==
In 1968, Los Bravos played in Istanbul, and having caught her act, offered Taner a role in a Spanish musical. Whilst promoting in Spain, she attracted the attention of Paramount Pictures and was offered a small part in Villa Rides. On returning to Turkey, Taner continued her acting career until she left for Germany and marriage to Peter Harold, Los Bravos's guitarist. The couple had a daughter; after divorcing, Taner returned to Turkey and began directing her career toward music.

Taner signed a record deal, with the 1 Numara Plakçılık, a label belonging to Ali Kocatepe. Her debut 45 rpm record "Tanrı Şahidimdir – Şimdi Sen Varsın" was released in 1974. The following year, her second single "Nene Hatun – Yalnızlığı Bir de Bana Sor" was released. Her first two records were not successful. She began an acting career. Later, she took to the stage as a group with Seyhan Karabay and Sedat Avcı. In 1976, she transferred to Yavuz Asöcal's record company and released her third single "Son Verdim Kalbimin İşine – Elveda" which was a success, as was her film Çizmeli Kedi that same year. Other 1970s singles include "Kalbimi Affettim", "Seni Çok Özledim" and "Gülme Komşuna". In 1980, she released her first album, Lider, and in 1986, her second, Leyla. In 1979, she appeared on TRT with Halil Ergün with a presentation of the first Turkish TV musical Çırpınış, a version of Asiye Nasıl Kurtulur. She opened a dance school with Sait Sökmen and taught dancers for show business, including Hakan Peker.

With the song "Dünya", Taner came in second in the Turkish National Final for the Eurovision Song Contest 1986. The following year, the group Lokomotif and she came in first with the song "Şarkım Sevgi Üstüne". They failed to score any points and finished last in the Eurovision Song Contest 1987. After the result, she took a break. She returned to music and recorded "Nanay". Her other 1980s singles include "Elalem Ne Der", "Naciye", "Leyla", "Nanay", and "Neler Oluyor".

In 1990, Taner moved to Bodrum. In 1991, she released the album Alladı Pulladı for which she contributed some lyrics and music. Her early 1990s singles include "Alladı Pulladı", "Şiirimin Dili", "Kırk Yılık Kani", and "La Havle Ya Settar". In 1993, she released "Geliyorum", after which she took a long break from music.

In 2002, Taner released her best-of album Seyyalname, En İyileriyle Seyyal Taner in 2005 and En İyileriyle Seyyal Taner 2 in 2007. In 2007, she duetted "Erkek Adamsın" with Zakkum in his first studio album. In March 2012, she released her maxi-single album, Ethnic Rock. and toured. In 2014, she sang "Canımsın Deme Bana" on the Wonderland album of İlhan Erşahin.

Taner has many gay fans and is considered a Turkish gay icon. According to the LGBT magazine, KAOS GL, she is their "greatest gay icon."

== Discography ==
=== Studio albums ===
- Lider (1981)
- Leyla (1986)
- Nanay (1989)
- Alladı Pulladı (1991) (Verified solo release; corrected and decoupled from any unverified collaborative or duet entries)
- Kalbimi Affettim (1993)
- Geliyorum (1993)
- Seyyalname (2002)

=== EPs ===
- Ethnic Rock (2012)
- 3'Lü (2014)

=== LP recordings ===
- Tanrı Şahidimdir – Şimdi Sen Varsın (Bir Numara, 1974) (writer(s), Ali Kocatepe)
- Nene Hatun – Yalnızlığı Bir de Bana Sor (Bir Numara, 1975) (writer (s), Ali Kocatepe, Doğan Canku, et al.)
- Son Verdim Kalbimin İşine – Elveda (Yavuz, 1976) (writer (s), Ülkü Aker.)
- Kalbimi Affettim – Sarmaş Dolaş (Yavuz, 1976) (writer (s), Ülkü Aker, et al.)
- Gülme Komşuna Gelir Başına – Seni Çok Özledim (Yavuz, 1977) (writer (s) Çiğdem Talu and Melih Kibar)
- Sorma Neydi O – Neden Gelmedin (Yavuz, 1977) (writer (s) Çiğdem Talu and Melih Kibar)
- Şarkım Sevgi Üstüne-Une Melodie (TRT, 1987) (Şarkım Sevgi Üstüne)

=== Compilations featuring Seyyal Taner ===
- En İyileriyle Seyyal Taner 2 (Ossi Music, 1986)
- En İyileriyle Seyyal Taner (Ossi Music, 2005)
- The Best of Seyyal Taner (Elenor, 2009)

== Filmography ==
Films
Year	Title	Role	Notes
1968	Aslan Bey	Süreyya	
1968	Kara Güneş	Zeynep	
1968	Ölümsüz Adam		The first feature film
1968	Villa Rides	Guerrilla Girl	
1972	Vur		
1972	Vur Gardaş Vur	Kemal's lover	
1972	Vahşi Aşk	Sultan	
1972	Vahşetin Esirleri	Esma	
1972	Tehlikeli Görev	Reyhan	
1972	Suya Düşen Hayal Oyuncu	Seher, Nevin	
1972	Mahkum	Lamia	
1972	Karaoğlan Geliyor		
1972	Kanun Adamı	Rozita	
1972	Kanlı Öç	Berna	
1972	Kalleşler	Selma	
1972	İlk Aşk		
1972	Haydut Avcısı		
1972	Hacı Murat'ın İntikamı		
1972	Benimle Sevişir Misin	Sibel	
1972	Batıda Kan Vardı / Batıda Ölüm Var		
1973	Yaralı		
1973	Bu Toprağın Kızı		
1973	Vahşet	Ayşe	
1973	Ömer Hayyam	Semra	Omar Khayyám's biography was discussed.
1973	Katran Bebek	Seyyal	
1973	Talihsizler		
1973	Harman Son	Elif	
1973	Gönülden Yaralılar	Gönül Sunar	
1973	Gecelerin Hakimi	Sema	
1973	Felek	Burcu	
1973	Düşman	Natasha	
1973	Dağ Kanunu	Meryem	
1973	Çoban	Sevda	
1973	Cengiz Han'ın Fedaisi	Chun-Li	
1974	Televizyon Niyazi	Yaprak	
1974	Kısmet	Seyyal Taner	
1974	Kiralık Serseri	Suna	
1974	İmparator	Okşan	
1974	Gecelerin Ötesi / İster Darıl İster Sarıl	Leyla	
1974	Düşmanlarım Çatlasın		
1974	Cafer'in Nargilesi	Oyuncu	
1974	Beş Tavuk Bir Horoz	Okşan	
1975	Şehvet Kurbanı Şevket	Nuran	
1976	Çizmeli Kedi	Seyyal	
2016	Bana Git De	Leyal's mother	
Television Series
Year	Title	Role	Notes
1986–1988	Perihan Abla	Gülsüm Percons Meriç	
2002	Azad	Deniz	
2004	İstanbul Şahidimdir	Aylin	
2006	Maçolar	Dilan Hala	
2000–2006	Bizim Evin Halleri	Pür Neşe	
2012	Canımın İçi	Seyyal Taner	
2014	Güldür Güldür	Seyyal Taner	Guest player

Awards and achievements
Preceded by Klips ve Onlar with "Halley"	Turkey in the Eurovision Song Contest with Lokomotif; 1987	Succeeded by MFÖ with "Sufi"
