= Sevdim Sevilmedim =

EP by Candan Erçetin
- Released: July 1996
- Genre: Pop
- Label: Topkapı Müzik

Candan Erçetin chronology
Hazırım (1995)	Sevdim Sevilmedim (1996)	Çapkın (1997)

Sevdim, Sevilmedim / Umrumda Değil: The Remix EP (I Loved But Wasn't Loved / I Don't Care) is a remix EP by Candan Erçetin. The album features Turkish version of "Čaje šukarije" by Esma Redžepova, often erroneously thought to be a folk song.

== Track listing ==
1. Sevdim, Sevilmedim (Album Version) - 4:39
2. Umrumda Değil (An-atolian Mix) 4:44
3. Umrumda Değil (SLM Trancey Radio Edit) - 4:29
4. Umrumda Değil (Erol T. Ultramix) - 4:24
5. Umrumda Değil (Erol T. Ultraclub Mix) - 6:00
6. Umrumda Değil (SLM Tranceyclub Mix) - 6:08
7. Sevdim, Sevilmedim (Extended Version) - 6:56
