= Hazırım =

Studio album by Candan Erçetin
- Released: 6 July 1996
- Genre: Pop-folk
- Label: Topkapı Müzik
- Producer: Ünal Tunalı

Candan Erçetin chronology
Hazırım (1996)	Sevdim Sevilmedim (1996)

Hazırım (I'm Ready) is Candan Erçetin's debut studio album. It was released in 1996. The album mainly has a Thracian and Macedonian sound. Most of the lyrics were written by Mete Özgencil.

== Track listing ==
#	Title	English translation	lyrics by	music by
1	"Sevdim Sevilmedim"(Čaje Šukarije)	I loved, not be loved	Mete Özgencil	Esma Redžepova
2	"Hangi Aşk Adil Ki"	Which love is fair	Mete Özgencil	Gökhan Kırdar
3	"Bir Sır Gibi"	Like a secret	Ahmet Akkaya	
4	"Vakit Varken"	While there is time	Mete Özgencil	Yusuf Bütünley
5	"Hazırım"	I'm ready	Mete Özgencil	Gökhan Kırdar
6	"Nar Çiçeği"(Rumelaj)(Jeni Jol)	Pomegranate flower	Mete Özgencil	anonymous (Balkan folk song)
7	"Umrumda Değil"	I don't care	Mete Özgencil	Gökhan Kırdar
8	"Al Elimi Kara Sevda"	Take my hand melancholia	Mete Özgencil	Gökhan Kırdar
9	"Daha"	More	Mete Özgencil	Sezen Aksu
10	"Gel Yeter"	Come, it'll suffice	Mete Özgencil	Gökhan Kırdar
11	"Ninni"	Lullaby	Mete Özgencil	Gökhan Kırdar
12	"Umrumda Değil (Remix)"	-		
