= A Ballad for Çanakkale =

Turkish folk song

A Ballad for Çanakkale (Çanakkale türküsü) is a Turkish folk song about the Battle of Gallipoli which occurred during World War I on the Gallipoli Peninsula.

It was arranged by Muzaffer Sarısözen, with the lyrics of a local bard, İhsan Ozanoğlu, of Kastamonu.

== Lyrics ==
Lyrics in Turkish

Çanakkale içinde aynalı çarşı
Ana ben gidiyom düşmana karşı, off, gençliğim eyvah!

Çanakkale içinde bir ağaç selvi
Kimimiz nişanlı, kimimiz evli, off, gençliğim eyvah!

Çanakkale içinde bir kırık testi
Analar babalar ümidi kesti, off, gençliğim eyvah!

Çanakkale üstünü duman bürüdü
On üçüncü fırka harbe yürüdü, off, gençliğim eyvah!

Çanakkale elinde toplar kuruldu
Vay bizim uşaklar orda vuruldu, off, gençliğim eyvah!

Çanakkale köprüsü dardır geçilmez
Al kan olmuş suları bir tas içilmez, off, gençliğim eyvah!

Çanakkale'den çıktım yan basa basa
Ciğerlerim çürüdü kan kusa kusa, off, gençliğim eyvah!

Çanakkale'den çıktım başım selamet
Anafarta'ya varmadan koptu kıyamet, off, gençliğim eyvah!

Çanakkale içinde vurdular beni
Ölmeden mezara koydular beni, off, gençliğim eyvah!

Çanakkale içinde sıra söğütler
Altında yatıyor aslan yiğitler, off, gençliğim eyvah!

English translation

In Çanakkale stands the Mirror Bazaar.
Mama, I set forth against the enemy, oh, my youth, alas!

In Çanakkale there's a cypress tree.
Some of us are engaged, some of us married, oh, my youth, alas!

In Çanakkale there's a broken jug.
Mothers and fathers abandoned hope, oh, my youth, alas!

Çanakkale's heights are shrouded with smoke.
The thirteenth division marched to war, oh, my youth, alas!

In Çanakkale the cannonballs landed.
Ah, our comrades got shot there, oh, my youth, alas!

Çanakkale's bridge is narrow, impassable.
Its waters have become red blood, not a cup can be drunk, oh, my youth, alas.

From Çanakkale I barely escaped
My lungs rotted from vomiting blood, oh, my youth, alas!

I got out of Çanakkale, left my worries behind
Hell broke loose before I reached Anafarta, oh my youth, alas

In Çanakkale they shot me.
They buried me before I died, oh, my youth, alas!

In Çanakkale are rows of willows
Brave lions lay beneath them, oh, my youth, alas.

External videos
- ΤΣΑΝΑΚΑΛΕ ΠΑΠΑΓΚΙΚΑ ΜΑΡΙΚΑ 1923 (Turkish Lyrics)
- ΤΣΑΝΑΚΑΛΕ, Ν. ΥΟΡΚΗ 1940, ΚΩΣΤΑΣ ΓΚΑΝΤΙΝΗΣ
