= Chante Hier Pour Aujourd'hui =

Studio album by Candan Erçetin
- Released: 8 May 2003
- Genre: Pop
- Length: 54:25
- Label: Topkapı Müzik
- Producer: Candan Erçetin

Candan Erçetin chronology
Neden (2002)	Chante Hier Pour Aujourd'hui (2003)	Remix (2003)

Chante Hier Pour Aujourd'hui (Singing Yesterday for Today) is Candan Erçetin's fifth solo album. It contain cover versions of popular songs of France. She mostly sings the songs on this album in French (except "Le Meteque" has some Turkish lyrics and "La Vie en Rose" has some German lyrics). "Il Me Semble" is the French translation of "Korkarım" from her Neden album. This album was publicated in only Turkey and France.

== Track listing ==
1. "Non, Je Ne Regrette Rien" (Marc Hayel, Charles Dumont, Michel Vaucaire) - 2:15
2. "Hier Encore" (Charles Aznavour) - 3:06
3. "Parole" (Michaele, M. Chiosso, G. Ferrio) (featuring Mercan Dede) - 4:43
4. "Le Meteque" (Georges Moustaki) - 3:59
5. "Ne Me Quitte Pas" (Jacques Brel) - 3:54
6. "Johnny Tu N'es Pas Un Ange v:1" (Francis Lemarque, Les Paul) - 3:56
7. "Avant De Nous Dire Adieu" (M. Mallory, J. Renard) - 5:08
8. "Padam... Padam..." (Glanzberg, Contet) - 2:52
9. "La Boheme" (Charles Aznavour) - 5:28
10. "Et Maintenant" (Pierre Delanoe, Gilbert Becaud) - 4:49
11. "La Vie En Rose" (Edith Piaf, Louiguy) - 3:44
12. "Milord" (Georges Moustaki, Marqguerite Monnot) (featuring Mercan Dede) - 3:52
13. "Il Me Semble" (Aylin Atalay, Neslihan Engin, Candan Erçetin) - 3:17
14. "Johnny Tu N'es Pas Un Ange v:2" (Francis Lemarque, Les Paul) - 3:00
