= Klips ve Onlar =

Turkish band

Klips ve Onlar was a Turkish band of the 1980s.

They represented Turkey in the Eurovision Song Contest 1986 with the song Halley which reached 9th position, the highest ever for the country until then.

The group members who won the national final were Sevingül Bahadır, Gür Akad, Emre Tukur, Derya Bozkurt and Seden Kutlubay. However Kutlubay declined to go to Eurovision, therefore she was replaced by Candan Erçetin.

Keyboardist Emre Tukur died in November 2024, aged 55.

Awards and achievements
Preceded by MFÖ with "Didai didai dai"	Turkey in the Eurovision Song Contest; 1986	Succeeded by Seyyal Taner & Lokomotif with "Şarkım Sevgi Üstüne"
