= Çapkın =

Studio album by Candan Erçetin
- Released: 3 June 1997
- Genre: Pop
- Label: Topkapı Music

Candan Erçetin chronology
Sevdim Sevilmedim (1996)	Çapkın (1997)	Oyalama Artık (1998)

Singles from Çapkın
- 1. "Çapkın" Released: 12 June 1997; 2. "Yalan" Released: 18 September 1997; 3. "Onlar Yanlış Biliyor" Released: 6 February 1998; 4. "Her Aşk Bitermiş" Released: 3 October 1998

Çapkın (Womanizer) is Candan Erçetin's second studio album. Most of the lyrics written by Mete Özgencil. The album sold 74,000 copies in Turkey. The song "Yalan" made a huge success all over Turkey.

== Track listing ==
#	Title	English title	Writer(s)	Composer(s)
1	"Çapkın"	Womanizer	A. Baki Çallıoğlu	
2	"Kaybettik Biz"	We've lost	Mete Özgencil	Candan Erçetin & Mete Özgencil
3	"İnanma"	Don't believe	Mete Özgencil	Candan Erçetin & Mete Özgencil
4	"Hayranım Sana"	I adore you	Sinan	Akın Ertübey
5	"Aşkı Ne Sandın"	What do you assume of love	Mete Özgencil	Candan Erçetin & Sinan
6	"Her Aşk Bitermiş"	Every love will end	Mete Özgencil	Candan Erçetin & Mete Özgencil
7	"Geri Dönemem"	I can't return	Mete Özgencil	Candan Erçetin & Mete Özgencil
8	"Beyaz Atlım"	My white equestrian	Candan Erçetin & Mete Özgencil	
9	"Onlar Yanlış Biliyor"	They know wrong	Sinan	Candan Erçetin
10	"Yalan"	Lie	Mete Özgencil	Yıldız Usmanova
11	"Habire Durmadan"	Always, non-stop	Mete Özgencil	Candan Erçetin & Mete Özgencil
12	"Teselli"	Consolation	Sinan	Candan Erçetin
