= Mete Özgencil =

- Born: Halil Mete Özgencil; 1962 (age 63–64)
- Occupations: Songwriter, composer, music video director, singer, screenwriter, painter
- Years active: 1986–present

Mete Özgencil (born 1962) is a Turkish songwriter, composer, music video director, singer, screenwriter and painter.

== Early life ==
Born in Istanbul on 1962, Özgencil lived in İzmir for 14 years and graduated from the management faculty of Ege Üniversitesi. He worked as a graphic designer for four years and as a painter for two years. He has had eight personal exhibitions of his paintings. He made over 40 book covers of Çilek series of Remzi Kitabevi. He has been the art director of Irfan Tozum's film Cazibe Hanımın Gündüz Düşleri and won the best art director award in Ankara. He wrote the scenario of the film Mum Kokulu Kadinlar. He got involved with music and wrote more than 100 lyrics and directed over 200 music videos.

== Album ==
He released his own album Olmalı in 2001.

== Works ==
- 1993 Gökkhan Kırdar – Yerine Sevemem (Music Video)
- 1994 Candan Erçetin – Hazırım Album (9 Lyrics, 6 Music Videos)
- 1995 Umay Umay – Düşmedim Daha (Duet, Lyrics, Music Video)
- 1996 Candan Erçetin – Çapkın Album (9 Lyrics, MCM Best Director Award in 1998 with Her Aşk Bitermiş Music Video)
- 2000 Candan Erçetin – Elbette Album (9 Lyrics and Compositions)
- 2001 Mete Özgencil – Olmalı Album
- 2001 Tarkan – Karma Album (3 Lyrics and Compositions) (Ona Sor, Uzak, Verme)
- 2003 Hande Yener – Hosgeldiniz (Lyrics, Composition, Music Video) and Bir İz Gerek (Lyrics, Composition)
- 2003 Nilufer – Acılara Son (Lyrics, Composition, Music Video)
- 2003 Mine Çayıroğlu-Zümrüt Gibi(Lyrics, Compositions, Music Video)
- 2004 Hepsi – (5 Lyrics and Compositions) – Olmaz Oğlan (Music Video)
- 2005 Hande Yener – Apayrı Album (7 Lyrics and Compositions)
- 2005 Redd – Mutlu Olmak Için Album (3 Music Videos : Öperler, Bahçelere Daldık, Mutlu Olmak İçin)
- 2006 Gülben Ergen – (Bile Bile Lyrics)
- 2007 Ayça – Ciddiyete Davet Album (5 Lyrics and Compositions, Kanar Mıyım Music Video)
- 2008 Özgür Çevik – Düşüşüm Album (Music Video : Düşüşüm)
- 2009 Nilufer – Hayal Album (4 Lyrics and Compositions)
