= La fiesta terminó =

1985 song by Paloma San Basilio

Single by Paloma San Basilio

from the album La fiesta terminó
- Language: Spanish
- B-side: "Sin ti"
- Released: 1 April 1985
- Genre: Ballad
- Length: 3:30
- Label: Hispavox
- Songwriter: Juan Carlos Calderón
- Producer: Rafael Trabucchelli

Paloma San Basilio singles chronology
"Perfidia" (1984)	"La fiesta terminó" (1985)	"Como el viento" (1985)

Eurovision Song Contest 1985 entry
- Country: Spain
- Artist: Paloma San Basilio
- Language: Spanish
- Composer: Juan Carlos Calderón
- Lyricist: Juan Carlos Calderón
- Conductor: Juan Carlos Calderón

Finals performance
- Final result: 14th
- Final points: 36

Entry chronology
- ◄ "Lady, Lady" (1984)
- "Valentino" (1986) ►

"La fiesta terminó" (Spanish pronunciation: [la ˈfjesta teɾmiˈno]; "The Party's Over") is a song recorded by Spanish singer Paloma San Basilio, written by Juan Carlos Calderón. It represented Spain in the Eurovision Song Contest 1985, placing fourteenth.

== Background ==
=== Conception ===
The song was composed by Juan Carlos Calderón for Paloma San Basilio's album La fiesta terminó. Calderon was internationally best known for writing Mocedades' 1973 entry "Eres tú", a song that finished second in the contest and went on to become a worldwide hit. He also has composed Sergio y Estíbaliz's 1975 entry "Tú volverás" and Nina's 1989 entry "Nacida para amar".

The song is a melancholy ballad about a finished relationship. San Basilio sings that "the party's over" and asks her former lover not to insist anymore: "What good is loving without love? Why put more wood on a fire that's already burnt out...?".

=== Eurovision ===
On 5 March 1985, Televisión Española (TVE) announced that it had internally selected the song and the performer as its entry for the 30th edition of the Eurovision Song Contest. On 1 April 1985, TVE presented the song and the promo video that was distributed to the other participant broadcasters. For the song to participate in the contest, it was necessary to shorten it by thirty seconds to fit it into three minutes.

On 4 May 1985, the Eurovision Song Contest was held at Scandinavium in Gothenburg hosted by Sveriges Television (SVT), and broadcast live throughout the continent. Paloma San Basilio performed "La fiesta terminó" fifth on the night, following Denmark's "Sku' du spørg' fra no'en?" by Hot Eyes and preceding France's "Femme dans ses rêves aussi" by Roger Bens. Calderón himself conducted the event's live orchestra in the performance of the Spanish entry.

At the close of voting, it had received 36 points, placing fourteenth in a field of nineteen. It was succeeded as Spanish entry at the 1986 contest by "Valentino" by Cadillac.

== Legacy ==
=== Impersonations ===
- In the thirteenth episode of the fourth season of Tu cara me suena aired on 11 December 2015 on Antena 3, Vicky Larraz impersonated Paloma San Basilio singing "La fiesta terminó" replicating her performance at Eurovision.
- In the seventeenth episode of the sixth season of Tu cara me suena aired on 9 February 2018 on Antena 3, Brays Efe impersonated Paloma San Basilio singing "La fiesta terminó" replicating her performance in the promo video.
- In the thirteenth episode of the thirteenth season of Tu cara me suena aired on 10 July 2026 on Antena 3, Cristina Castaño impersonated Paloma San Basilio singing "La fiesta terminó" replicating her performance at Eurovision.
