= Terminal 3 (song) =

1984 song by Linda Martin

Single by Linda Martin
- Released: 1984
- Songwriter: Seán Sherrard

Eurovision Song Contest 1984 entry
- Country: Ireland
- Artist: Linda Martin
- Language: English
- Composer: Seán Sherrard
- Lyricist: Seán Sherrard
- Conductor: Noel Kelehan

Finals performance
- Final result: 2nd
- Final points: 137

Entry chronology
- ◄ "Here Today Gone Tomorrow" (1982)
- "Wait Until The Weekend Comes" (1985) ►

"Terminal 3" is a song written by Seán Sherrard, and performed by Linda Martin. It represented Ireland in the Eurovision Song Contest 1984.

The song was written and composed by previous contest winner Johnny Logan, who had won for Ireland in the 1980 contest and would later go on to win the 1987 contest as a performer before writing another song for Martin to win in 1992 with. The result of this song is thus part of Logan's positioning as the most successful contest entrant in history.

The song itself is a moderately up-tempo number, with Martin singing about her feelings while waiting for her lover to disembark from a flight from the United States. She sings that her own feelings for him have not changed and that she hopes that the same is true of him, although "he's been away too long now". The central motif of the song is the line "Terminal Three: flight's on time", and Logan has stated he was inspired to write the song while waiting in Heathrow Airport's Terminal 3 for a flight home.

The original promotional video features Martin travelling to, and eventually (in an inset) meeting her lover at Dublin Airport, which was a single terminal airport at the time and still does not have a Terminal 3.

Before the contest, the song had been considered one of the favourites to win and had attracted attention from the media. The song was performed ninth on the night, following Belgium's Jacques Zegers with "Avanti la vie" and preceding Denmark's Hot Eyes with "Det' lige det". At the close of voting, it had received 137 points, placing 2nd in a field of 19.

It was succeeded as Irish representative at the 1985 contest by Maria Christian with "Wait Until The Weekend Comes".

== Charts ==
Chart (1984)	Peak position
Ireland (IRMA)	7
