= Finland in the Eurovision Song Contest 1986 =

- Eurovision Song Contest 1986
- Participating broadcaster: Yleisradio (Yle)
- Country: Finland
- Selection process: National final
- Selection date: 22 February 1986

Competing entry
- Song: "Never the End"
- Artist: Kari Kuivalainen
- Songwriter: Kari Kuivalainen

Placement
- Final result: 15th, 22 points

Participation chronology

Finland was represented at the Eurovision Song Contest 1986 with the song "Never the End", written and performed by Kari Kuivalainen. The Finnish participating broadcaster, Yleisradio (Yle), selected its entry in the contest through a national final.

== Before Eurovision ==
=== National final ===
Yleisradio (Yle) invited nine composers for the competition. The national final was held on 22 February 1986 at its studios in Helsinki, hosted by Kari Lumikero. The winner was chosen by expert jury. Each juror distributed their points as follows: 1–8 and 10 points. The winner was "Päivä kahden ihmisen" performed and composed by Kari Kuivalainen. The voting was rather tight and Kuivalainen won by only one point over the second-placing entrant.

Final – 22 February 1986
R/O	Artist	Song	Songwriter(s)	Points	Place
1	Kirka and Kim	"Aitoa taikaa"	Kisu Jernström; Kassu Halonen; Edu Kettunen	74	3
2	Tulip	"Tanssin aurinkoon"	Jukka Siikavire; Jussi Tuominen	22	9
3	Irina Milan and Eija Ahvo	"Applause"	Esa Nieminen; Irina Milan	53	5
4	Kirka	"Uusiin taivaisiin"	Edu Kettunen	88	2
5	Sonja Lumme	"Tappavat kyyneleet"	Jim Pembroke; Jukka Virtanen	48	6
6	Gruppo Jokke	"Kaamoksen maa"	Jokke Seppälä; Siru Seppälä	37	7
7	Kim Lönnholm	"Rautataivas"	Esa Kaartamo; Pekka Pohjola	64	4
8	Kari Kuivalainen	"Päivä kahden ihmisen"	Kari Kuivalainen	89	1
9	Danny	"Ninja"	Veikko Samuli; Raul Reiman; Jyrki Hämäläinen	31	8

Detailed Jury Votes
R/O	Song	Black Mike	P. Dammert	M. Fagerlund	P. Helin	R. Kinnunen	K. Klockars	J-P Koikkalainen	T. Liete	K. Liuhala	E. Melakoski	R. Sarmanto	Total
1	"Aitoa taikaa"	8	6	7	7	6	3	10	7	6	6	8	74
2	"Tanssin aurinkoon"	1	1	1	1	1	1	8	3	1	3	1	22
3	"Applause"	2	5	5	4	5	7	3	5	5	7	5	53
4	"Uusiin taivaisiin"	7	8	8	6	10	8	6	8	10	10	7	88
5	"Tappavat kyyneleet"	3	4	4	2	4	10	1	4	4	8	4	48
6	"Kaamoksen maa"	4	3	3	3	3	4	5	2	3	4	3	37
7	"Rautataivas"	6	7	6	8	7	5	4	6	7	2	6	64
8	"Päivä kahden ihmisen"	10	10	10	10	8	6	2	10	8	5	10	89
9	"Ninja"	5	2	2	5	2	2	7	1	2	1	2	31

== At Eurovision ==
For the contest, the song's title "Päivä kahden ihmisen" was changed to "Never the End", and one line of the song was changed. Kuivalainen performed nineteenth on the night of the contest, following Denmark and preceding Portugal. Kuivalainen was accompanied by Kati Bergman, Rele Kosunen, Anita Pajunen and Jokke Seppälä as backing vocalists. At the close of the voting it had received 22 points, placing 15th in a field of 20 competing countries.

=== Voting ===
Points awarded to Finland
Score	Country
12 points	
10 points	
8 points	Belgium
7 points	
6 points	Iceland
5 points	
4 points	
3 points	Cyprus; Germany
2 points	
1 point	Netherlands; Turkey

Points awarded by Finland
Score	Country
12 points	Belgium
10 points	United Kingdom
8 points	Ireland
7 points	Switzerland
6 points	Austria
5 points	Sweden
4 points	Luxembourg
3 points	Netherlands
2 points	Germany
1 point	Spain
