= Finland in the Eurovision Song Contest 1985 =

- Eurovision Song Contest 1985
- Participating broadcaster: Yleisradio (Yle)
- Country: Finland
- Selection process: Euroviisut 1985
- Selection date: 16 February 1985

Competing entry
- Song: "Eläköön elämä"
- Artist: Sonja Lumme
- Songwriters: Petri Laaksonen; Veli-Pekka Lehto

Placement
- Final result: 9th, 58 points

Participation chronology

Finland was represented at the Eurovision Song Contest 1985 with the song "Eläköön elämä", composed by Petri Laaksonen, with lyrics by Veli-Pekka Lehto, and performed by Sonja Lumme. The Finnish participating broadcaster, Yleisradio (Yle), selected its entry through a national final.

== Before Eurovision ==
Twelve entries were selected for the competition from 149 received submissions. The composers got to choose between Ami Aspelund, Bianca Morales, Pave Maijanen, Riki Sorsa, Sonja Lumme, and Tapani Kansa to perform their songs. Maijanen, however, withdrew due to a salary dispute, and was replaced by Jokke Seppälä. The songs premiered on 3 February 1985 on the radio. The five rejected songs were also played.

=== Euroviisut 1985 ===
Yleisradio (Yle) held the national final on 16 February 1985 at its television studios in Helsinki, hosted by Seppo Hovi. The winner was chosen by six regional juries. Each jury group consisted of ten members, and each juror distributed their points between 1–5 points for each song.

Final – 16 February 1985
R/O	Artist	Song	Songwriter(s)	Points	Place
1	Tapani Kansa	"Siksi lauluni soi"	Kaj Kuittinen, Tapani Kansa	184	3
2	Bianca Morales	"Ei aina svengaa"	Mika Siekkinen, Aappo I. Piippo	105	12
3	Ami Aspelund and Riki Sorsa	"Lapset maailman"	Kari Kuusamo, Ami Aspelund, Pasi Hiihtola	180	4
4	Sonja Lumme	"Mulle rakkauden kevät toi"	Matti Auranen, Sonja Lumme	123	11
5	Jokke Seppälä	"Jossain"	Pave Maijanen	158	6
6	Ami Aspelund	"Sången om vårt hus"	Sven Sid, Bo Carpelan	131	9
7	Riki Sorsa	"Haaveissa vainko oot mun?"	Kari Kuivalainen	221	2
8	Bianca Morales	"Mennään vaan"	Esko M. Toivonen, Ilkka Vesterinen	155	7
9	Tapani Kansa	"Onnellisuus"	Pepe Willberg, Kirsti Willberg	128	10
10	Ami Aspelund	"Mandy"	Jokke Seppälä, Siru Seppälä	144	8
11	Bianca Morales and Jokke Seppälä	"Huomenna"	Kisu Jernström, Kassu Halonen, Timo Lehtiö	179	5
12	Sonja Lumme	"Eläköön elämä"	Petri Laaksonen, VeePee Lehto	255	1

Detailed Regional Jury Votes
R/O	Song	Rovaniemi	Kuopio	Vaasa	Turku	Jyväskylä	Helsinki	Total
1	"Siksi lauluni soi"	25	34	37	33	27	28	184
2	"Ei aina svengaa"	18	18	20	16	12	21	105
3	"Lapset maailman"	36	31	32	34	26	21	180
4	"Mulle rakkauden kevät toi"	19	18	19	24	20	23	123
5	"Jossain"	28	30	31	28	21	20	158
6	"Sången om vårt hus"	19	22	15	16	33	26	131
7	"Haaveissa vainko oot mun?"	30	42	39	34	32	44	221
8	"Mennään vaan"	22	26	30	25	15	37	155
9	"Onnellisuus"	15	27	21	27	14	24	128
10	"Mandy"	15	28	20	24	30	27	144
11	"Huomenna"	38	30	33	32	25	21	179
12	"Eläköön elämä"	39	37	45	48	49	37	255

== At Eurovision ==
Lumme performed 2nd on the night of the contest, following Ireland and preceding Cyprus. Lumme was accompanied by Kaija Kokkola, Rele Kosunen, Anita Pajunen and Jokke Seppälä as backing vocalists. At the close of the voting it had received 58 points, placing 9th of 19.

=== Voting ===
Points awarded to Finland
Score	Country
12 points	
10 points	Greece; Sweden
8 points	
7 points	Italy; United Kingdom
6 points	Cyprus; Ireland; Spain
5 points	
4 points	
3 points	Turkey
2 points	Switzerland
1 point	Israel

Points awarded by Finland
Score	Country
12 points	Sweden
10 points	Germany
8 points	Spain
7 points	United Kingdom
6 points	Italy
5 points	France
4 points	Norway
3 points	Switzerland
2 points	Turkey
1 point	Ireland
