= Sweden in the Eurovision Song Contest 1985 =

- Eurovision Song Contest 1985
- Participating broadcaster: Sveriges Television (SVT)
- Country: Sweden
- Selection process: Melodifestivalen 1985
- Selection date: 2 March 1985

Competing entry
- Song: "Bra vibrationer"
- Artist: Kikki Danielsson
- Songwriters: Lasse Holm; Ingela "Pling" Forsman

Placement
- Final result: 3rd, 103 points

Participation chronology

Sweden was represented at the Eurovision Song Contest 1985 with the song "Bra vibrationer", composed by Lasse Holm, with lyrics by Ingela Forsman, and performed by Kikki Danielsson. The Swedish participating broadcaster, Sveriges Television (SVT), selected its entry through Melodifestivalen 1985. In addition, SVT was also the host broadcaster and staged the event at the Scandinavium in Gothenburg, after winning the previous edition with the song "Diggi-Loo Diggi-Ley" by Herreys.

In order to save money for the staging of the Eurovision Song Contest itself, Melodifestivalen1985 was a reduced version of the competition. Of the ten entries, five went through to a second round, which was won by the song "Bra vibrationer", written by Lasse Holm and Ingela "Pling" Forsman and sung by Kikki Danielsson. Kikki had already represented Sweden three years earlier, as part of the pop group Chips. The other half, Elisabeth Andreassen, went to win for Norway, alongside the group Bobbysocks.

== Before Eurovision ==
=== Melodifestivalen 1985 ===
Melodifestivalen 1985 was the selection for the 25th song to represent Sweden at the Eurovision Song Contest. It was the 24th time that this system of picking a song had been used. 90 songs were submitted to Sveriges Television (SVT) for the competition. The final was held at the SVT Studios in Malmö on 2 March 1985, and was broadcast on TV1 but was not broadcast on radio. The presenter, Eva Andersson, was the 1980 Miss Sweden. Andersson's partner at the time, Jeffrey Epstein, was in the studio audience. No orchestra was used, as all songs were performed to backing track. There have been claims that this was because SVT could not afford to hire the orchestra for two shows, as they were hosting the Eurovision Song Contest 1985.

Seventeen-year-old Pernilla Wahlgren, singing "Piccadilly Circus", was the favourite to win. However, she finished 4th and the following day Lasse Anrell from Swedish newspaper Expressen was "angry". 85% of the Expressen readers who phoned afterwards said that "the wrong song" won.

Kikki Danielsson won with the song "Bra vibrationer", which throughout the years has become something of a signature song. This was the fourth victory in a row for Bert Karlsson's label Mariann Grammofon AB. Five of the songs were, alone or not, written by Ingela 'Pling' Forsman and Monica Forsberg.

R/O	Artist	Song	Songwriters	Points	Place
1	Kikki Danielsson	"Bra vibrationer"	Lasse Holm; Ingela 'Pling' Forsman	56	1
2	Suzanne Frölén	"Vänner"	Claes Buhre; Olle Bergman	0	10
3	Göran Folkestad	"Eld och lågor"	Göran Folkestad; Monica Forsberg	35	3
4	Ritz	"Nu har det hänt igen"	Peter Wanngren; Monica Forsberg	10	7
5	Per-Erik Hallin	"Morgonluft"	Per-Erik Hallin	18	6
6	Bel Air	"1 + 1 = 2"	Christer Bjärehag; Ingela 'Pling' Forsman	8	8
7	Li Berg	"Jag vet hur det känns"	Dick Berglund; Ingela 'Pling' Forsman	20	5
8	Dan Tillberg	"Ta min hand"	Dan Tillberg; Svante Persson; Cecilia von Melen	49	2
9	Stefan Borsch	"Sjung din sång"	Martin Contra; Björn Frisén	4	9
10	Pernilla Wahlgren	"Piccadilly Circus"	Lars Andersson; Bruno Glenmark	29	4

Voting
Song	15–20	20–25	25–30	30–35	35–40	40–45	45–50	50–55	55–60	Total
"Bra vibrationer"	6	8	6	8	6	8	4	2	8	56
"Ta min hand"	4	6	8	4	8	2	8	8	1	49
"Eld och lågor"	2	1	4	6	4	6	6	4	2	35
"Piccadilly Circus"	8	2	2	2	1	1	1	6	6	29
"Jag vet hur det känns"	1	4	1	1	2	4	2	1	4	20

== At Eurovision ==
For the final Sweden performed in 16th position, or fourth from last. It did very well in the voting and came third with 103 points, 20 points behind the winner.

=== Voting ===
Points awarded to Sweden
Score	Country
12 points	Finland; Norway
10 points	Ireland
8 points	Denmark; Germany; Switzerland
7 points	Belgium; France
6 points	Israel; United Kingdom
5 points	Luxembourg
4 points	Austria; Italy; Turkey
3 points	
2 points	Spain
1 point	

Points awarded by Sweden
Score	Country
12 points	Norway
10 points	Finland
8 points	Germany
7 points	Ireland
6 points	France
5 points	Denmark
4 points	United Kingdom
3 points	Austria
2 points	Israel
1 point	Switzerland
