= Spain in the Eurovision Song Contest 1985 =

- Eurovision Song Contest 1985
- Participating broadcaster: Televisión Española (TVE)
- Country: Spain
- Selection process: Internal selection
- Announcement date: Artist: 5 March 1985; Song: 1 April 1985

Competing entry
- Song: "La fiesta terminó"
- Artist: Paloma San Basilio
- Songwriter: Juan Carlos Calderón

Placement
- Final result: 14th, 36 points

Participation chronology

Spain was represented at the Eurovision Song Contest 1985 with the song "La fiesta terminó", written by Juan Carlos Calderón, and performed by Paloma San Basilio. The Spanish participating broadcaster, Televisión Española (TVE), internally selected its entry for the contest. The song, performed in position 5, placed fourteenth –tying with the song from Turkey– out of nineteen competing entries with 36 points.

== Before Eurovision ==
Televisión Española (TVE) internally selected "La fiesta terminó" performed by Paloma San Basilio as its entry for the Eurovision Song Contest 1985 among forty songs. (Note: The internal TVE committee in charge of selecting the entry was made up of: Carmen Sarabia, Antonio Gómez, Antonio Resines, Carlos Tena, Pablo Rodríguez, and Ángel Luis Ramirez.) The song was written by Juan Carlos Calderón. The broadcaster announced the name of the song, the songwriter, and performer on 5 March 1985. On 1 April, TVE presented the song along the promo video that was distributed to the other participant broadcasters.

== At Eurovision ==
On 4 May 1985, the Eurovision Song Contest was held at Scandinavium in Gothenburg hosted by Sveriges Television (SVT), and broadcast live throughout the continent. San Basilio performed "La fiesta terminó" 5th on the evening, following Denmark and preceding France. Her dress was designed for the occasion by José Ramón de Aguirre. Calderón himself conducted the event's orchestra performance of the Spanish entry. At the close of the voting "La fiesta terminó" had received 36 points, placing 14th in a field of 19 –tying with the song from Turkey–.

TVE broadcast the contest in Spain on TVE 2 with commentary by Antonio Gómez Mateo. Before the event, TVE aired a talk show hosted by Marisa Medina introducing the Spanish jury from the Torrespaña production center, which continued after the contest commenting on the results.

=== Voting ===
TVE assembled a jury panel with eleven members. The following members comprised the Spanish jury:

- Ágatha Ruiz de la Prada – designer
- Francisco Umbral – writer
- Jesús María Landín – student
- César Alonso Peña – jockey
- Adriana Ferrer – actress
- Eloy Román – indrustrialist
- María Dolores Ortiz – teacher
- Cristina Peña Martín – teacher
- María Asquerino – actress
- Agustín Trialasos – journalist (Note: Football player Emilio Butragueño and philosopher Javier Sádaba were initially announced instead Trialasos and de la Huerta.)
- Pilar de la Huerta – tourism business technician

The jury was chaired by Tomás Zardoya, Head of Broadcasting at TVE, with Francisco Hortelano as secretary. Francisco Javier Alfaro was the notary public. These did not have the right to vote, but the president decided in the event of a tie. The jury awarded its maximum of 12 points to Italy.

Points awarded to Spain
Score	Country
12 points	Turkey
10 points	
8 points	Finland
7 points	
6 points	Greece
5 points	
4 points	United Kingdom
3 points	
2 points	Ireland; Portugal
1 point	Cyprus; Luxembourg

Points awarded by Spain
Score	Country
12 points	Italy
10 points	Germany
8 points	Israel
7 points	Greece
6 points	Finland
5 points	United Kingdom
4 points	Ireland
3 points	Turkey
2 points	Sweden
1 point	Norway
