= Paloma San Basilio =

Spanish singer (born 1950)

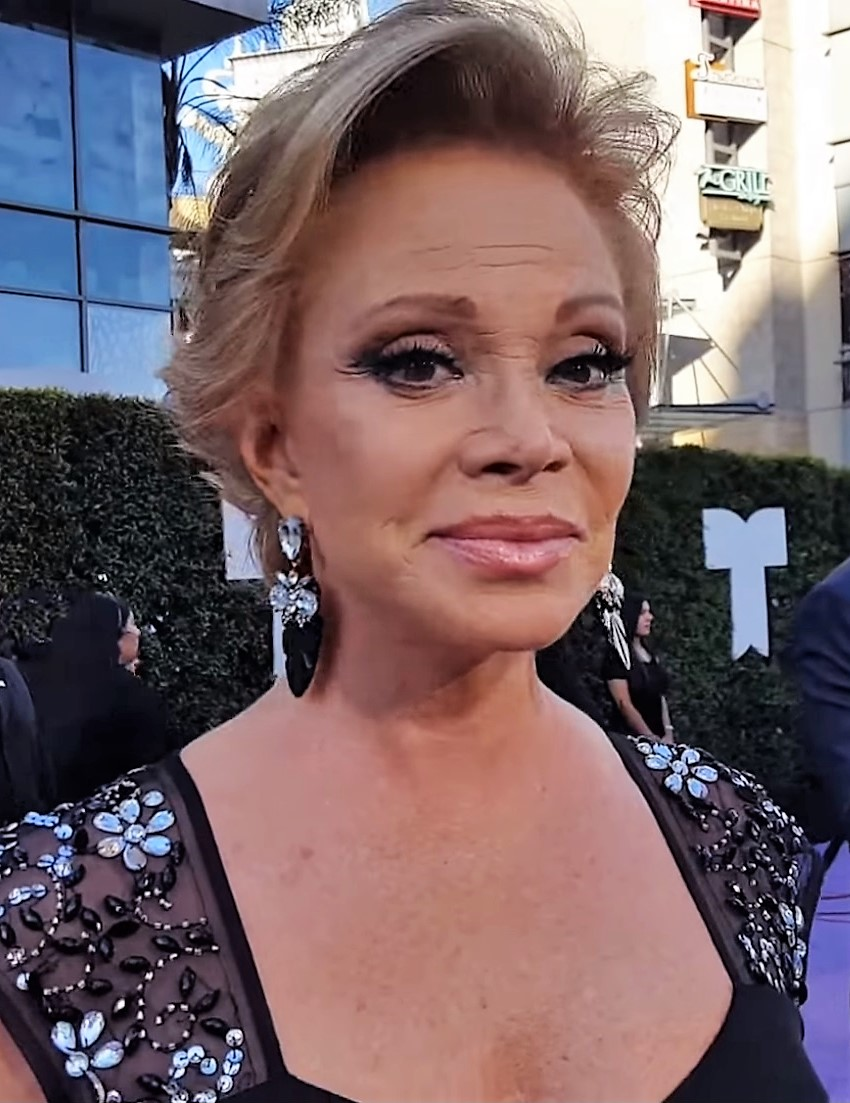
- San Basilio interviewed in 2016

Background information
- Born: Paloma Cecilia San Basilio Martínez; 22 November 1950 (age 75); Madrid, Spain
- Genres: Latin pop
- Occupation: Singer
- Years active: 1975–present (singer)
- Labels: Hispavox, Capitol, Epic, EMI Latin, Columbia, EMI International, Parlophone
- Website: Official Website

Paloma Cecilia San Basilio Martínez (born 22 November 1950), known as Paloma San Basilio (IPA: [paˈloma sam baˈsiljo]), is a Spanish singer. She is a recipient of the Latin Grammy Lifetime Achievement Award for her valuable contributions to Latin music. She has sold over 16 million records throughout her career, with styles that range from melodic songs to pop. She often appeared in various musicals such as the Spanish-language premiere production of Andrew Lloyd Webber's Evita in Madrid. Some other musical theater works include Man of La Mancha, My Fair Lady, Victor/Victoria, and Sunset Boulevard.

She announced her retirement in 2013, touring in Europe and America. She is currently doing a symphonic tour in Colombia, where she will be stopping in Armenia, Cali, Bucaramanga, Pereira, Bogotá, Medellín and Manizales as one of her last musical projects in her artistic life.

== Life ==
In the early 1970s, she married the athlete Ignacio Gómez Pellico; they divorced shortly after. She had a daughter from that marriage, Ivana. Paloma later started a relationship with businessman Claudio Rey; they have been together for over 30 years. Paloma prefers to keep her personal and private lives separated. She rarely speaks about her private affairs, yet she is respected by journalists. She has a cordial relationship with the press, and she received the award Premio Naranja in the ‘80s, an award granted by journalists to those public figures with whom they better relate.

== Career ==
Paloma San Basilio was born in Madrid, lived her childhood in Seville and her adolescence in Lugo. Before she started her artistic career in 1975, she began her studies of Philosophy and Psychology at the Complutense University of Madrid but never completed them.

=== Early years ===
During the first years of the 70's, she hosted the TV show Siempre en domingo and worked as an actress in a zarzuela show called Divertido siglo. In 1975 she recorded her first album “Sombras”, which was an international hit including her own songs as well as classic songs like “The Way We Were”, “The Long And Winding Road” or “Feelings”. Her following album, "Dónde vas" (1977) included more dynamic tunes, composed by Bebu Silvettu, and also ballads like "Dónde vas", that gave the record its name and that was pre-selected to represent Spain in the Eurovision Song Contest 1977. Her influences are very diverse—from artists like The Beatles, Sarah Vaughan, Billie Holiday or Barbra Streisand to artists that she often listens to in her stay in Seville, like Lola Flores or Gracia Montes, which makes it impossible to categorize her in any musical genre.

23 October 1978, she recorded in the Teatro Monumental in Madrid her album En Directo, where we can find one of her most popular songs “Beso a Beso… dulcemente”, as well as versions of classic solo international women songs — such as "I Say a Little Prayer" (Aretha Franklin), "People" (Barbra Streisand), "Parole Parole" (Mina) and "Sweet Sadie the Savior" (Patti Austin).

Also in 1978 the album was republished for the Latin-American fans, including versions like “Ahora” ("Ancora, ancora, ancora", from the Italian singer Mina) and “Sobre el arcoiris”, from The Wizard of Oz (Over the Rainbow) that she recorded in Spanish. She also added a self-written song, “Atardecer”. There were two singles in the album. The first one, “Secretos”, from Bebu Silvetti and Miguel Tottis, is a disco song with high notes. The second one, Beso a beso... dulcemente, which was also the name of the album, became one of her most successful hits and is now a classic in her repertory.

=== Evita and Eurovision Song Contest ===
In December 1980 she released the musical Evita in many theaters like Madrid, Barcelona, San Juan de Puerto Rico, Mayagüez, Ciudad de México, Caracas, Panamá, Santo Domingo, San José, Bogotá, Quito, Lima, Santiago de Chile and Miami with huge success. Paloma's fame was in ascent not only in those countries she visited, but also in those where her play Evita did not arrive due to political problems, which was the case of Argentina, where a military dictatorship had taken over the country at that time. Her outstanding performance in Evita made both the character and the actress become closely related. It was released both in a double disc and in a single disc edition. Andrew Lloyd Webber himself, one of the authors of the play, praised and depicted Paloma as one of the best Evita's performances. According to the critics of the moment, she created this character such a way, that hat not existed in her predecessors. Again, her vocal abilities were surprising in songs such as "Buenos Aires", "La Nueva Argentina" or "Vals para Eva y Ché". When Oliver Stone was going to shoot the film, something he never got to do, Paloma was one of the soundest candidates to interpret Eva Perón.

Evita was performed for a two-year period, during which her next two studio albums were released. "Ahora" (1981) increased even more its popularity with songs like the famous "Juntos", "La Hiedra", "Recuerdos (Memory)" (main theme of the musical Cats and "El Inmenso" (with arrangements slightly different from the ’78 release). This album is one of the most celebrated of the singer and includes a beautiful photo shoot, made by the photographer Antonio Molina. It meant her return to the discographic world, after a three-year break. "Dama", her following album (1983), became famous for songs like "Dama", "El aire del sábado tarde" and other rhythmic sounds such as "Bailando", "Fiesta del interior" and "Unas vacaciones". Between 1983 and 1984, she started in Puerto Rico a triumphant series of tours throughout Latin America, and on her return to Spain she presented her new work "Paloma", which was already a hit in Latin America with "Por qué me abandonaste" and was one of her best-selling works. Synthesizers and instruments could be heard in this album, that were very common at the time. She was also co-author of several of her themes, something she would often do in the years that were to come.

She represented Spain in the Eurovision Song Contest 1985 with the song "La fiesta terminó", name of her new album composed and produced by Juan Carlos Calderón. By then Eurovision took place in the Swedish city of Gothenburg and was an important thing for her career, despite not getting a very high score in the ranking. According to her style, she included versions of classics like "Sin ti" original of the Welsh band Badfinger, "We're All Alone", of Rita Coolidge, adapted with the title "Impaciencia", or "Que Va Que va" (the classic song "Manureva" by Serge Gainsbourg).

Within Televisión Española (TVE) series La comedia musical española she starred Las Leandras and La Cenicienta del Palace and took part in a third TV series, El sobre verde, where she interprets the Fortune Goddess and sings "De una monedita de oro". Those three were published in the collection "La Revista" of Hispavox. Even today, it is usual for Paloma to perform "Los Nardos" in her concerts, a melody included in Las Leandras.

She hosted the show "En vivo" at the Teatro Monumental in Madrid, with the release of a successful double album. She sang for those affected by the earthquake in Mexico and by the volcano Nevado del Ruiz in Colombia both in 1985. She hosted the OTI Festival 1985 with Emilio Aragón and throughout that year she could be heard on the radio with songs like "Por culpa de una noche enamorada", "Como el viento", "El beso de tu boca", "Impaciencia" and "Sin ti". Since then, her tours and presentations went on, giving the best out of herself in each of them; she took great care of the character, costumes, the stage, choreography, repertoire, lightning, etc., which made her highly valued by critics and public as they were great shows; very similar to those made in the United States.

Juan Carlos Calderón produced her new work, "Vuela alto", in 1986, where "Cariño mío" excels. This show was again one of the best-selling albums of her career, given the quality of her compositions. Vuela alto was also the name of the world tour that broke box-office records. In the following years, Paloma continued to release records continuously; "Grande" (1987), awarded with a Platinum album and the tour under the same name kept the star on tour for more than 6 months, including a version of the song from Theodorakis "Luna De Miel", as well as Obregón Pareja's songs, Mendo and Fuster (successful authors of "Puerta de Alcalá"), Albertelli, Rosa Girón, KC Porter, Armando Manzanero, etc. There were two versions of this album—one for the American market with "Los Sueños Son Tan Grandes" and another one for Spain, where the song was replaced by "La tragedia de Eva". It's followed by "Life" (1988), album that was released in Latin America without the song “Bienvenido al Paraíso" and that includes in its CD format an extra song titled "Amor Diablo". It also includes a version of Pat Benatar's classic "We Belong" (Mi Pasión), the Spanish song of Los Miserables "On My Own" or a compendium of fragments of songs like "Bésame Mucho", "The Fool On The Hill", "Alfonsina y el mar", "No te mires en el río", "Music "... all together in a fantastic song called "Música" which shows the restlessness and admiration that the singer feels for this eclectic kind of music.

=== 1990s ===
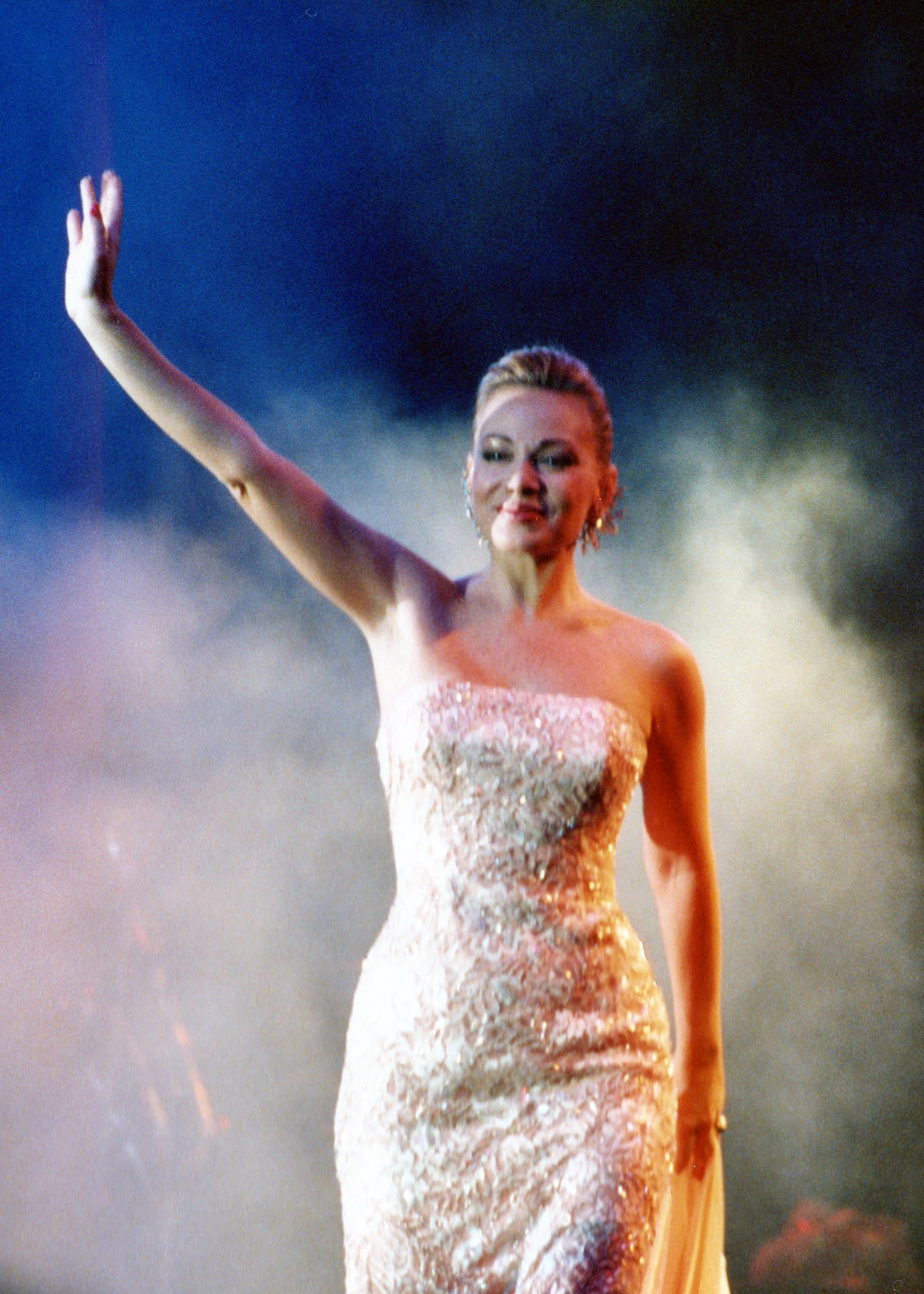
San Basilio in Atlantic City, New Jersey, in 1992

To celebrate her 15-year career in 1990, she simultaneously recorded and edited two albums; "Nadie como tú", for Latin America (from which the enormous success “Demasiado herida” stands out) and "Quiéreme Siempre" for Spain. The latter album featured "Un largo camino" as a duet with CRAG, as well as a cover of “Wind Beneath My Wings”, originally by Bette Midler. On 3 March 1991, she performed a duet concert with the tenor Plácido Domingo in Miami, which was released as a video and LP and reached multimillion-dollar sales. It features a variety of genres including Zarzuela pieces like "la Revoltosa", Operetta, like “Vals de la Viuda Alegre”, American musicals, like "Phantom of the Opera" and "New York, New York", boleros, tango, Hispano-American songs and "No llores por mí, Argentina" (from Evita).

Paloma continued her success with productions such as "De mil amores" (1991), which included songs such as "Orí Oro", "No Quiero Arrepentirme", "De Mil Amores" or "Un Gran Amor". This work has been made simultaneously with "Paloma Mediterránea" (1992), in which she recreated the song "Mediterráneo" by Serrat and others like "Apres Toi" by Vicky Leandros, "El Concierto de Aranjuez" by Joaquín Rodrigo or "Himno al Amor" by Édith Piaf. The first album was released for the American market only and the second one for Spain. Two years later, she released "Al Este del Edén" (1994), album including songs from unknown young authors and which was one of the singer's favorites. That same year she performed a duet concert with the tenor José Carreras, with 20,000 people in Bogotá. "Como un sueño" (1995) celebrates her 20-year career and led her to touring for about twenty months. This concert was published in a double CD for Spain and was reduced to a single CD in Latin America. Different celebrities joined in, such as Estela Raval, Gloria Lasso, Cristina del Valle (from the duet Amistades Peligrosas), El Dúo Dinámico, El Consorcio and Juan Pardo. She hosted the OTI Festival 1992 with Joaquín Prat and the OTI Festival 1993 with Francisco.

In 1997, Paloma sang pieces from classical musicians like Beethoven, Pachelbel or Massenet in her new work "Clásicamente tuya", which was released in early 1998 in Latin America with a different cover and did not include the song "Meditación". In November 1997, after 17 years, she resumed her performance in the musical El hombre de La Mancha with José Sacristán, which broke box-office records. This musical was also released in a double CD, and played for 2 years in Madrid, 1 month in Barcelona and 2 months in Buenos Aires.

In 1999 she announced "Perlas", a pop-style recording based on versions of English-language classics adapted to Spanish ("You've Got a Friend", "Un-break my heart", "Immortality", "Let the River Run", "Angel of Mine", etc.), where Paloma first sings with her daughter Ivana Vanessa Gómez the song "Calling you".

=== 2000s ===
In 2000 Paloma left EMI (her lifelong record label since 1984) and released with Sony her bolero album called "Escorpio" in 2001. Produced by Bebu Silvetti, it became very popular in America. This album included the first Spanish version of Michael Bolton famous song "How Am I Supposed To Live Without You", as well as songs like "No Ha Pasado Nada" by Armando Manzanero and a Medley of Brazilian music songs ("Voce Abusó", "Aguas De Marzo", "Mais que Nada").

In 2001 she also returned to theaters performing in My Fair Lady, again with José Sacristán. The musical played for 19 months at the Teatro Coliseum in Madrid, achieving the well-deserved recognition for great artist in a difficult genre like musicals, and received the title of "Queen of the Musical" by the Spanish critic. A CD was released from that musical. In 2002, she recorded and edited an album with songs of musicals, "Eternamente, grandes éxitos de grandes musicales", for the company Ventura Discos SL, with songs from some of the musicals she interpreted herself. It highlights an impeccable version of "Summertime", as well as the song from Jesus Christ Superstar, "Es más que amor" ("I don't know how to love him"), which had become popular by Ángela Carrasco. This album, despite reuniting hits from musicals like Evita, The Phantom of the Opera, Porgy and Bess, Jesus Christ Superstar, Cats or Sunset Boulevard, did not have huge success perhaps because there was not much chemistry with the producer, Christian De Walden, who had already produced other albums with performers such as Marta Sánchez.

On 28 September 2005, she successfully premiered the musical Victor/Victoria at the Teatro Coliseum in Madrid. Her difficult Victoria Grant character was a big success, in which she played a man and a woman at the same time. Her cast partner was the great Paco Valladares. On 1 November^{st,} 2006, Paloma was awarded with a Latin Grammy Award in New York City: the 2006 Music Excellence Award.

In 2006 she recorded Invierno Sur, an intimate album influenced by smooth jazz, featuring compositions by various songwriters such as Armando Manzanero and Amaury Gutiérrez. The album includes a song based on a composition by Hans Zimmer, who granted her the rights to use "Nyah and Ethan", a piece that gave its name to both the song and the album, Invierno Sur. It also includes a version of the song "Vives entre sombras" ("Livin' in the shadows") from the musical Victor/Victoria. Invierno Sur was released in Spain on 29 January 2007 and was co-produced by RLM.

In 2008 she did the "Encantados tour", accompanied by the maestro Luis Cobos, along with a symphony orchestra of more than 60 musicians. A DVD was released from this tour as well as a CD gathering the best moments and highlighting the "O Mio Babbino Caro", an opera song that Paloma performs easily. In Latin America the album was released without the DVD.

She then toured the "PSB tour" (Piano, Sax and Bass). This tour included simultaneously several Spanish provinces and cities of Latin America, achieving a huge success both from the public and the critics. This tour began in early 2009 and ended up in 2010. It was a show where she reviewed her most successful songs along with international well-known songs, only followed by a piano, bass and saxophone.

=== 2010s ===
At the beginning of 2010 she was invited to record the theme song of an Argentinian soap opera starring by the actress Soledad Silveyra ("Secretos de Amor", which was broadcast by the Argentinian TELEFE channel). The song is called "Amor sin edad" and was composed by Eduardo Frigerio.

In March 2012 she published the album "Amolap" (Paloma written backwards), whose first released song not only amazed some but cause different opinions. This might be claimed to the tecno music sound and the lyrics in English which state: "Love makes my world go round". The first single from the album was "Yo quiero volar", a sophisticated pop sound comparable to an Anglo-Saxon pop ballad.

In June 2012 she also premiered the musical My Fair Lady that toured in several Spanish cities; ending the tour in Valencia on 4 November. On 22 November she announced on Twitter and Facebook her last year on tour.

On 6 January^{th,} 2014, she gave a concert in the Teatro Real in Madrid, where great operas and classical music take place and where only a few singers have performed. She played songs from musicals such as Mary Poppins, Cats or Evita and ended with "Los Nardos" by las Leandras, which was a big success.

On 2 January 2016, she premiered a concert along with Los Chicos del Coro de Saint Marc, called "Voces para el alma".

== Farewell Tour 'Hasta Siempre' and new album with Los Chicos del Coro ==
Paloma San Basilio announced her withdrawal from the music scene after 40 years. For that reason, in 2013 she started a farewell tour and she chose Latin America as a starting point in order to show her gratitude for her artistic career. She participated in the Viña del Mar International Song Festival 2014 (Chile) where she won the Silver and the Gold Torch as well as the Silver and Gold Seagull awards. She is also working on an album in collaboration with Los Chicos Del Coro, which will include musical songs and versions of classics such as "I Say A Little Prayer" and "Amazing Grace", which were expected to be released in October 2015.

== Discography ==
- Sombras (1975)
- Dónde vas/ El color del mar (1977, single)
- Beso a beso... dulcemente (1978)
- En directo (1978)
- Evita (musical) (1980)
- Ahora (1981)
- Dama (1983)
- Paloma (1984)
- La Cenicienta del Palace (1985)
- Las Leandras (1985)
- El sobre verde (1985)
- La Fiesta Terminó (1985)
- En vivo (1985)
- Vuela alto (1986)
- Grande (1987)
- La sinfonía de los tres tiempos de América (1988)
- Vida (1988)
- Nadie como tú (1990)
- Quiéreme siempre (1990)
- Plácido, Paloma por fin juntos! [Live] (1991)
- De mil amores (1991)
- Paloma mediterránea (1992)
- Al este del edén (1994)
- Como un sueño (1995)
- Clásicamente tuya (1997)
- El hombre de La Mancha (musical) (1997)
- Perlas (1999)
- Escorpio (2001)
- My Fair Lady (musical) (2001)
- Eternamente, grandes éxitos de grandes musicales (2002)
- La música es mi vida (compilation) (2003)
- Víctor Victoria (musical) (2005)
- Diva (compilation) (2006)
- Invierno Sur (2006)
- Encantados (2008)
- Amolap (2012)
- Las canciones de mi vida (2015)

== See also ==
- List of best-selling Latin music artists

Awards and achievements
Preceded by Bravo with "Lady, Lady"	Spain in the Eurovision Song Contest; 1985	Succeeded by Cadillac with "Valentino"
