= Norway in the Eurovision Song Contest 1985 =

- Eurovision Song Contest 1985
- Participating broadcaster: Norsk rikskringkasting (NRK)
- Country: Norway
- Selection process: Melodi Grand Prix 1985
- Selection date: 30 March 1985

Competing entry
- Song: "La det swinge"
- Artist: Bobbysocks!
- Songwriters: Rolf Løvland

Placement
- Final result: 1st, 123 points

Participation chronology

Norway was represented at the Eurovision Song Contest 1985 with the song "La det swinge", written by Rolf Løvland, and performed by Bobbysocks!. The Norwegian participating broadcaster, Norsk rikskringkasting (NRK), organised the national final Melodi Grand Prix 1985 in order to select its entry for the contest. Both Bobbysocks! members, Elisabeth Andreassen and Hanne Krogh, had previous Eurovision experience – Krogh as a 15-year-old for Norway at the 1971 contest and Andreassen for Sweden at the 1982 contest as part of Chips. Both would make further appearances for Norway, Krogh in 1991 and Andreassen in 1994 and 1996.

"La det swinge" was chosen as the Norwegian entry on 30 March, and went on to bring Norway its first Eurovision victory after decades of being the butt of jokes about their status as Eurovision's perennial also-rans. It was admitted that the lyrics of "La det swinge" had been written with the specific intention of avoiding those Norwegian consonant combinations which had been said to sound harsh in song to non-Scandinavian ears.

== Before Eurovision ==
=== Melodi Grand Prix 1985 ===
The Melodi Grand Prix 1985 was held on 30 March at the Chateau Neuf in Oslo, hosted by Rita Westvik. The staging was now set in a modern way for accompanying live music for the first time in the history of national final, while the usage of the orchestra were replaced with a live band (e.g. band drums, electric guitars, keyboard synthesizers and horns) and was conducted by Terje Fjærn. Ten songs took part in the final, with the winner chosen by voting from five regional juries and a panel of experts consisting of Tony Visconti, Anne Marie David, Stikkan Andersson and Ronnie Hazlehurst. One of the other participants was former three-time Norwegian representative Anita Skorgan.

Final – 30 March 1985
R/O	Artist	Song	Songwriter(s)	Regional Jury	Expert Jury	Total	Place
1	Pastel	"Ring ring ring"	Pete Knutsen; Marianne Mørk	39	27	66	3
2	Bjørn Eidsvåg	"Gammel drøm"	Bjørn Eidsvåg	18	26	44	7
3	Zaz	"Oh-là-là"	Amund Enger	12	15	27	9
4	Kai Eide	"Love, amour og kjærlighet"	Kai Eide	10	12	22	10
5	Rolf Graf	"II & II"	Rolf Graf; Finn Kalvik	31	19	50	5
6	Anita Skorgan	"Karma"	Anita Skorgan; Lars Kilevold	30	44	74	2
7	Bobbysocks!	"La det swinge"	Rolf Løvland	46	34	80	1
8	Mia Gundersen and Olav Stedje	"Nattergal"	Jonas Fjeld; Astor Andersen	30	26	56	4
9	Hilde Heltberg	"Livet har en sjanse"	Hilde Heltberg; Stein Gulbrandsen	37	12	49	6
10	Silje Nergaard	"Si det, si det"	Silje Nergaard	27	9	36	8

Detailed Regional Jury Votes
R/O	Song	Tromsø	Steinkjer	Elverum	Porsgrunn	Stavanger	Total
1	"Ring ring ring"	3	9	9	9	9	39
2	"Gammel drøm"	4	3	3	2	6	18
3	"Oh-là-là"	2	1	5	3	1	12
4	"Love, amour og kjærlighet"	1	4	1	1	3	10
5	"II & II"	9	5	6	7	4	31
6	"Karma"	6	8	4	4	8	30
7	"La det swinge"	7	11	11	6	11	46
8	"Nattergal"	5	7	2	11	5	30
9	"Livet har en sjanse"	8	6	8	8	7	37
10	"Si det, si det"	11	2	7	5	2	27

Detailed Expert Jury Votes
R/O	Song	T. Visconti	A. M. David	S. Andersson	R. Hazlehurst	Total
1	"Ring ring ring"	7	7	5	8	27
2	"Gammel drøm"	4	8	9	5	26
3	"Oh-là-là"	1	4	4	6	15
4	"Love, amour og kjærlighet"	3	3	3	3	12
5	"II & II"	9	2	6	2	19
6	"Karma"	11	11	11	11	44
7	"La det swinge"	8	9	8	9	34
8	"Nattergal"	6	6	7	7	26
9	"Livet har en sjanse"	5	5	1	1	12
10	"Si det, si det"	2	1	2	4	9

== At Eurovision ==
On the evening of the final Bobbysocks! performed 13th in the running order, following Italy and preceding the United Kingdom. At the close of voting "La det swinge" had picked up 123 points, enough for victory by an 18-point margin over runners-up Germany.

=== Voting ===
Points awarded to Norway
Score	Country
12 points	Austria; Belgium; Denmark; Germany; Ireland; Israel; Sweden; United Kingdom
10 points	
8 points	
7 points	Luxembourg
6 points	Italy; Switzerland
5 points	
4 points	Finland
3 points	
2 points	France
1 point	Greece; Spain

Points awarded by Norway
Score	Country
12 points	Sweden
10 points	Israel
8 points	Germany
7 points	United Kingdom
6 points	Denmark
5 points	Switzerland
4 points	Luxembourg
3 points	Ireland
2 points	Austria
1 point	Turkey
