= Cyprus in the Eurovision Song Contest 1985 =

- Eurovision Song Contest 1985
- Participating broadcaster: Cyprus Broadcasting Corporation (CyBC)
- Country: Cyprus
- Selection process: National final
- Selection date: 17 February 1985

Competing entry
- Song: "To katalava arga"
- Artist: Lia Vissi
- Songwriter: Lia Vissi

Placement
- Final result: 16th, 15 points

Participation chronology

Cyprus was represented at the Eurovision Song Contest 1985 with the song "To katalava arga", written and performed by Lia Vissi. The Cypriot participating broadcaster, the Cyprus Broadcasting Corporation (CyBC), selected its entry through a national final.

== Before Eurovision ==
=== National final ===
==== Competing entries ====
The Cyprus Broadcasting Corporation (CyBC) opened a submission period for Cypriot artists and composers to submit cassette tapes of their songs from 14 November 1984 until 12 January 1985. A total of 62 submissions was received, which at the time was the highest number of submissions received by CyBC for a Eurovision selection. However, eighteen of the entries were invalid, with eight of them having arrived after the submission deadline and the other ten disqualified during the initial presentation of the songs when they were found to break the rules of the preselection.

One of the invalid entries was "Allelougia tis eirinis" by Isadoras, and another was written by Stavros Sidas. One of Andy Paul's entries was called "Glukia melodia". Known submitted entries, as well as the results of the first stage of the preselection, are listed below:

Competing entries / First stage - 17 February 1985
R/O	Artist	Song	Songwriter(s)	Result
1				—N/a
2				—N/a
3		"Magiko nisi" (Μαγικό νησί)		Advanced
4				—N/a
5				—N/a
6	Panikos Charalambous	"Thimissou Katerina" (Θυμήσου Κατερίνα)	Giorgos Theofanous; Giorgos Karavokyris	Advanced
7				—N/a
8				Disqualified
9				Advanced
10				Advanced
11				—N/a
12				Disqualified
13				—N/a
14				—N/a
15				Advanced
16				Advanced
17				—N/a
18				Disqualified
19				Disqualified
20				—N/a
21				Advanced
22				—N/a
23				Disqualified
24				—N/a
25				Disqualified
26				—N/a
27				—N/a
28				—N/a
29				—N/a
30				—N/a
31	Lia Vissi	"To katalava arga" (Το κατάλαβα αργά)	Lia Vissi	Advanced
32	Andy Paul			—N/a
33				Advanced
34				Disqualified
35				—N/a
36	Andy Paul			Advanced
37				—N/a
38				Disqualified
39				—N/a
40				—N/a
41				Disqualified
42				Disqualified
43	Andy Paul			Advanced
44				—N/a
45				—N/a
46				—N/a
47				—N/a
48				Disqualified
49		"Agapimeni" (Αγαπημένη)	Petros Giannakis	Advanced
50				Advanced
51				—N/a
52				Disqualified
53				Disqualified
54				Disqualified
55				Disqualified
56				Disqualified
57				—N/a
58				Disqualified
59				Advanced
60				Advanced
61				Advanced
62				Disqualified

==== Format ====
The national final was intended to be held on 3 February 1985, as indicated by TV guides, but was instead held on 17 February 1985 at the Filoxenia Hotel in Nicosia and was hosted by Pavlos Pavlou. The results were decided by a 140-member jury consisting of 40 professionals and 100 members of the public. Members of the public who wished to participate in the jury had to be Cypriot nationals over the age of 16 and had between 19 February and 26 February 1985 to apply. The 100 public jury members were drawn at random on 29 February 1985.

The competition consisted of five stages and lasted the entire day, from around 10:00 EET until 22:00 EET. In the first stage, the submitted recordings of all 62 songs were presented, the invalid entries were removed from the competition, and each jury member chose their sixteen favourite songs, after which the votes were collected and the sixteen songs with the highest number of votes progressed to the second stage. In the second stage, the sixteen songs were presented again and were then whittled down to eight songs, which were then whittled down to four and then two songs. The winner was chosen out of the final two songs, where each jury gave one vote to their favourite song. The last part of the competition, with the final four songs, was broadcast live on TV.

Second stage - 17 February 1985
R/O	Artist	Song	Result
3		"Magiko nisi" (Μαγικό νησί)	Advanced
6	Panikos Charalambous	"Thimissou Katerina" (Θυμήσου Κατερίνα)	Advanced
9			—N/a
10			—N/a
15			Advanced
16			Advanced
21			—N/a
31	Lia Vissi	"To katalava arga" (Το κατάλαβα αργά)	Advanced
33			—N/a
36	Andy Paul		—N/a
43	Andy Paul		Advanced
49		"Agapimeni" (Αγαπημένη)	Advanced
50			—N/a
59			—N/a
60			—N/a
61			Advanced

Third stage - 17 February 1985
R/O	Artist	Song	Result
3		"Magiko nisi" (Μαγικό νησί)	Advanced
6	Panikos Charalambous	"Thimissou Katerina" (Θυμήσου Κατερίνα)	Advanced
15			—N/a
16			—N/a
31	Lia Vissi	"To katalava arga" (Το κατάλαβα αργά)	Advanced
43	Andy Paul		—N/a
49		"Agapimeni" (Αγαπημένη)	Advanced
61			—N/a

Fourth stage - 17 February 1985
R/O	Artist	Song	Points	Place	Result
3		"Magiko nisi" (Μαγικό νησί)	42	4	—N/a
6	Panikos Charalambous	"Thimissou Katerina" (Θυμήσου Κατερίνα)	83	2	Advanced
31	Lia Vissi	"To katalava arga" (Το κατάλαβα αργά)	86	1	Advanced
49		"Agapimeni" (Αγαπημένη)	47	3	—N/a

Fifth and final stage - 17 February 1985
R/O	Artist	Song	Points	Place
6	Panikos Charalambous	"Thimissou Katerina" (Θυμήσου Κατερίνα)	62	2
31	Lia Vissi	"To katalava arga" (Το κατάλαβα αργά)	78	1

==== Controversy ====
Several issues and instances of rule breaking occurred during the competition that caused several competing artists to raise complaints to CyBC. During the initial presentation of the competing entries, five songs were revealed to last over three minutes and broke the rules of the preselection. However, only four of those songs were disqualified, while the other song was allowed to compete. Isadoras, whose song "Allelougia tis eirinis" was one of the disqualified songs, complained that Georgios Serdaris, one of the professional jury members, had argued in favour of the saved song by saying that it could be shortened to below three minutes, yet said the opposite about Isadoras' song, arguing that its structure does not allow for it to be shortened below three minutes. This led Isadoras to believe that Serdaris was biased towards the saved entry. Serdaris responded by saying he did not solely disqualify those songs, and that instead the jury voted on whether each song that violated the three minute rule should be allowed to remain in the competition. Additionally, Serdaris claimed that since the rules of the preselection stated that the jury members could not know the artists behind each entry, there was no way for him to be biased.

Other issues which were raised to CyBC by competing artists include: one of the jury members was involved in the preparation of the songs for the competition (packaging the tapes and entry info into envelopes) which would mean they would know the composers of the songs; there were organised groups among the jury who booed and cheered certain songs in an attempt to bias other jury members; several jury members played songs backstage during the intervals of the preselection in an attempt to influence other jury members; some jury members pushed for other jury members to not vote for the three songs that were sung by the previous year's Cypriot Eurovision entry Andy Paul; a man claiming to be the composer of song 31 ("To katalava arga" by Lia Vissi) had tried to persuade people to vote for song 31; several songs were known to have been performed to the public before the competition but were not disqualified; and singer Doros Georgiadis, who was believed to be competing in the competition, entered the voting hall (however these complaints were mistaken as Georgiadis was not competing and was only present during the final stage to see the results of the competition). Additionally, the full list of all 100 public jury members were released in newspapers a few weeks before the event and some competing artists raised the possibility that other competing artists could have contacted any of these jury members in an attempt to bias them in their favour. Among the artists who raised complaints include Isadoras, Petros Giannakis, and Panikkos Charalambous.

== At Eurovision ==
On the night of the final Vissi performed third in the running order, following Finland and preceding Denmark. At the close of voting "To katalava arga" had received 15 points, placing Cyprus 16th of the 19 entries. The Cypriot jury awarded its 12 points to Germany.

=== Voting ===
Points awarded to Cyprus
Score	Country
12 points	
10 points	
8 points	Greece
7 points	
6 points	
5 points	
4 points	
3 points	Italy; Switzerland
2 points	
1 point	Ireland

Points awarded by Cyprus
Score	Country
12 points	Germany
10 points	Italy
8 points	Greece
7 points	Ireland
6 points	Finland
5 points	Israel
4 points	France
3 points	Denmark
2 points	Switzerland
1 point	Spain
