= Kari Kuivalainen =

Finnish singer-songwriter

- Born: 14 November 1960 (age 65)
- Origin: Finland
- Genre: Pop
- Occupation: Singer

Kari Kuivalainen (born 14 November 1960) is a Finnish singer-songwriter, best known for his participation in the 1986 Eurovision Song Contest.

Kuivalainen was primarily a composer rather than a singer, and in 1985 he submitted his song "Haaveissa vainko oot mun?" ("Am I Only Dreaming You?") to the Finnish Eurovision selection, where it was performed by Finland's 1981 Eurovision entrant, Riki Sorsa and finished second.

In 1986, he entered another song, "Päivä kahden ihmisen", which was originally intended for singer Kaija Koo. However, she declined the chance to participate, so Kuivalainen decided to perform the song himself at the National Final, where he was the choice of the jury (by a margin of only one point over former Eurovision participant Kirka) to go forward to represent Finland at the 31st Eurovision Song Contest. Prior to the contest, Kuivalainen changed some of the lyrics to the song, and although it was sung in Finnish, the title was changed to "Never The End", which appeared on screen on the night of the contest and is the name by which the song is commonly known. The 1986 contest took place in Bergen, Norway on 3 May, with "Never the End" finishing in 15th place of the 20 entries.

Kuivalainen subsequently became a member of the band Menneisyyden Vangit, alongside another Eurovision veteran, Vicky Rosti.

Preceded by Sonja Lumme with Eläköön elämä	Finland in the Eurovision Song Contest; 1986	Succeeded by Vicky Rosti & Boulevard with Sata salamaa
