= Israel in the Eurovision Song Contest 1985 =

- Eurovision Song Contest 1985
- Participating broadcaster: Israel Broadcasting Authority (IBA)
- Country: Israel
- Selection process: Kdam Eurovision 1985
- Selection date: 28 March 1985

Competing entry
- Song: "Olé, Olé"
- Artist: Izhar Cohen
- Songwriters: Kobi Oshrat; Hamutal Ben-Ze'ev

Placement
- Final result: 5th, 93 points

Participation chronology

Israel was represented at the Eurovision Song Contest 1985 with the song "Olé, Olé", composed by Kobi Oshrat, with lyrics by Hamutal Ben-Ze'ev, and performed by Izhar Cohen. The Israeli participating broadcaster, the Israel Broadcasting Authority (IBA), selected its entry for the contest through Kdam Eurovision 1985. Cohen had previously represented Israel in 1978, winning the contest with the song "A-Ba-Ni-Bi" along with Alphabeta.

== Before Eurovision ==
=== Kdam Eurovision 1985 ===
The Israel Broadcasting Authority (IBA) held the Kdam Eurovision 1985 final on 28 March 1985 at the Binyaney Ha'uma in Jerusalem, hosted by Dalia Mazor and Nathan Datner. 14 songs took part and the winner was chosen by the votes of 7 regional juries.

Final – 28 March 1985
R/O	Artist	Song	Points	Place
1	Lea Lupatin	"Shir amelim"	30	5
2	Arba Lev Adom	"Hu yavoh"	30	5
3	Arik Sinai	"Mila ve od mila"	52	4
4	Corinne Allal	"Be'chol yom"	6	12
5	Yardena Arazi	"Od nagi'a"	61	3
6	Shalva Berti	"Ha'tfila"	11	11
7	Dalit Kahana	"Hazor"	17	9
8	Shimi Tavori	"Tnu li rak musica"	16	10
9	Casino	"Yad be'yad"	5	13
10	Yigal Bashan and Uzi Hitman	"Kmo tzoani"	65	2
11	Moni Arnon and Shimshon Levi	"Shuv ani levad"	2	14
12	Izhar Cohen	"Olé, Olé"	69	1
13	Kesem	"Tov"	20	8
14	Doron Mazar	"Hilulah"	21	7

Detailed Regional Jury Votes
R/O	Song	Be'er Tuvia	Haifa	Kiryat Malakhi	Jerusalem	Kfar Masaryk	Tel Aviv	Netanya	Total
1	"Shir amelim"	1	6	8	3	5	2	5	30
2	"Hu yavoh"	8	3		6	10		3	30
3	"Mila ve od mila"	7	10	2	7	6	8	12	52
4	"Be'chol yom"						6		6
5	"Od nagi'a"	12	7	10	10	7	7	8	61
6	"Ha'tfila"	3	1	1		2		4	11
7	"Hazor"	5	5	3		4			17
8	"Tnu li rak musica"	2	4	6	1		1	2	16
9	"Yad be'yad"						5		5
10	"Kmo tzoani"	10	12	7	8	8	10	10	65
11	"Shuv ani levad"				2				2
12	"Olé, Olé"	6	8	12	12	12	12	7	69
13	"Tov"	4		5	5	1	4	1	20
14	"Hilulah"		2	4	4	3	3	6	22
Spokespersons
Be'er Tuvia – Dani Lewinstein; Haifa – Amos Carmeli; Kiryat Malakhi – Gaby Yinon; Jerusalem – Menachem Perry; Kfar Masaryk – Moti Eden; Tel Aviv – Rafi Ginat; Netanya – Benny Uri

== At Eurovision ==
On the night of the final Cohen performed 11th in the running order, following Germany and preceding Italy. At the close of voting, "Olé, Olé" had received 93 points, placing Israel 5th of the 19 entries. The entry was conducted by Kobi Oshrat. The Israeli jury awarded its 12 points to Norway.

=== Voting ===
Points awarded to Israel
Score	Country
12 points	France
10 points	Norway
8 points	Ireland; Spain
7 points	Austria; Germany; Switzerland
6 points	Luxembourg
5 points	Cyprus; Italy; Portugal; United Kingdom
4 points	Denmark
3 points	
2 points	Greece; Sweden
1 point	

Points awarded by Israel
Score	Country
12 points	Norway
10 points	Austria
8 points	Ireland
7 points	Germany
6 points	Sweden
5 points	Luxembourg
4 points	Italy
3 points	France
2 points	United Kingdom
1 point	Finland
