= Dan Tillberg =

Swedish artist and producer (born 1953)

- Born: Dan Arne Tillberg; 9 April 1953 (age 73)
- Origin: Ystad, Sweden
- Genres: Pop, schlager
- Occupations: Singer, songwriter
- Instruments: Vocals; guitar
- Years active: 1973–present
- Formerly of: Änglabarn

Dan Arne Tillberg (born 9 April 1953 in Ystad) is a Swedish artist and producer. He is the son of Arne Tillberg and Ettie Tillberg.

== Career ==
Dan Tillberg began his career in 1973 as a singer, guitarist and percussionist in the progg-influenced duo Änglabarn (Angel Children), along with Sven Ingmar Olsson. In 1977, he started his own recording studio in Malmö, Bellatrix, and a record label of the same name the following year.

In 1979, his first LP, Gatstenar (Paving Stones), was released, which featured Swedish-language cover versions of Rolling Stones songs, and in 1981 was followed by the LP Mors och fars kärlek (Mother And Father's Love), which was his breakthrough. The following year, his next LP, Kärlek minus noll (Love Minus Zero), was released, which featured Swedish-language cover versions of Bob Dylan songs. In 1983, his next LP, "Genom tårar" (Through Tears), was released, followed by "Erogena zoner" (Erogenous Zones) in 1985, which became perhaps his greatest success.

In Melodifestivalen 1985, he came in second place with "Ta min hand" (Take My Hand), and also participated in Melodifestivalen 1986 with "ABCD". In 1987, his LP "Raka vägen till paradiset" (Straight to paradise) was released, which was his last LP released before a long break. In 1986, Tillberg also starred in an episode of the TV series "Skånska mord" (Scanian Murders), with Ernst-Hugo Järegård in the lead role.

After that, his popularity diminished and he went on to run an advertising company, which became bankrupt in 2001. Then he began to devote himself to music again and released some CD singles. These were followed in 2005 with a double CD, called Akten tar gestalt (The Act Takes Shape), which features a collection of his old songs, released on Mixed Media Records, a record label he started the same year with Rickard Mattsson. The record label, which borrowed its name from the band Mixed Media, which was previously signed to Tillberg's former record label, Bellatrix, is now bankrupt, and the record label business with the associated recording studio has ended. While Tillberg worked as a producer, he was active in the kitchen industry through the companies Köket i första rummet AB and Skånekök & Måleri AB.

== Discography ==
- 1973 – Änglabarn – LP
- 1979 – Gatstenar – LP
- 1981 – Mors och fars kärlek – LP
- 1982 – Kärlek minus noll – LP
- 1983 – Genom tårar – LP
- 1985 – Erogena zoner – LP
- 1987 – Raka vägen till paradiset – LP
- 2005 – Akten tar gestalt – double CD
