= Portugal in the Eurovision Song Contest 1985 =

- Eurovision Song Contest 1985
- Participating broadcaster: Radiotelevisão Portuguesa (RTP)
- Country: Portugal
- Selection process: Festival RTP da Canção 1985
- Selection date: 7 March 1985

Competing entry
- Song: "Penso em ti, eu sei"
- Artist: Adelaide
- Songwriters: Tozé Brito; Adelaide Ferreira; Luís Fernando

Placement
- Final result: 18th, 9 points

Participation chronology

Portugal was represented at the Eurovision Song Contest 1985 with the song "Penso em ti, eu sei", composed by Tozé Brito, with lyrics by Adelaide Ferreira and Luís Fernando, and performed by Ferreira herself. The Portuguese participating broadcaster, Radiotelevisão Portuguesa (RTP), selected its entry at the Festival RTP da Canção 1985.

== Before Eurovision ==
=== Festival RTP da Canção 1985 ===
Radiotelevisão Portuguesa (RTP) held the Festival RTP da Canção 1985 at the Coliseu dos Recreios in Lisbon on 7 March 1985, hosted by Margarida Andrade and Eládio Clímaco. Eleven songs competed at the national final. The votes of national juries chose the winner. The winning entry was "Penso em ti, eu sei", composed by Tozé Brito, with lyrics by Adelaide Ferreira and Luís Fernando, and performed by Ferreira herself.

Final – 7 March 1985
R/O	Artist	Song	Points	Place
1	Eduarda	"Meu amor, minha dor, meu jardim"	182	2
2	Gustavo Sequeira	"Mágica"	70	8
3	Jorge Silva	"Portugal, meu jardim"	34	10
4	Alexandra	"Cantar saudade"	130	6
5	Delfins	"A casa da praia"	28	11
6	Nelo Silva	"Entre céu e mar"	47	9
7	Luis Filipe	"Mulher só (mulher giesta)"	133	5
8	Nuno and Henrique	"Meia de conversa"	171	3
9	Jorge Fernando	"Umbadá"	168	4
10	Adelaide Ferreira	"Penso em ti, eu sei"	219	1
11	Aguarela	"Malmequer, sim ou não"	94	7

== At Eurovision ==
Adelaide Ferreira was the ninth performer on the night of the contest, following Belgium and preceding Germany. At Gothenburg, she was credited by only her first name. At the close of the voting the song had received 9 points, placing 18th in a field of 19 competing countries. It was the worst ranking Portugal had received since 1981.

=== Voting ===
Points awarded to Portugal
Score	Country
12 points	
10 points	
8 points	
7 points	Greece
6 points	
5 points	
4 points	
3 points	
2 points	Turkey
1 point	

Points awarded by Portugal
Score	Country
12 points	Italy
10 points	Luxembourg
8 points	Ireland
7 points	Germany
6 points	United Kingdom
5 points	Israel
4 points	Switzerland
3 points	France
2 points	Spain
1 point	Denmark
