= Sonja Lumme =

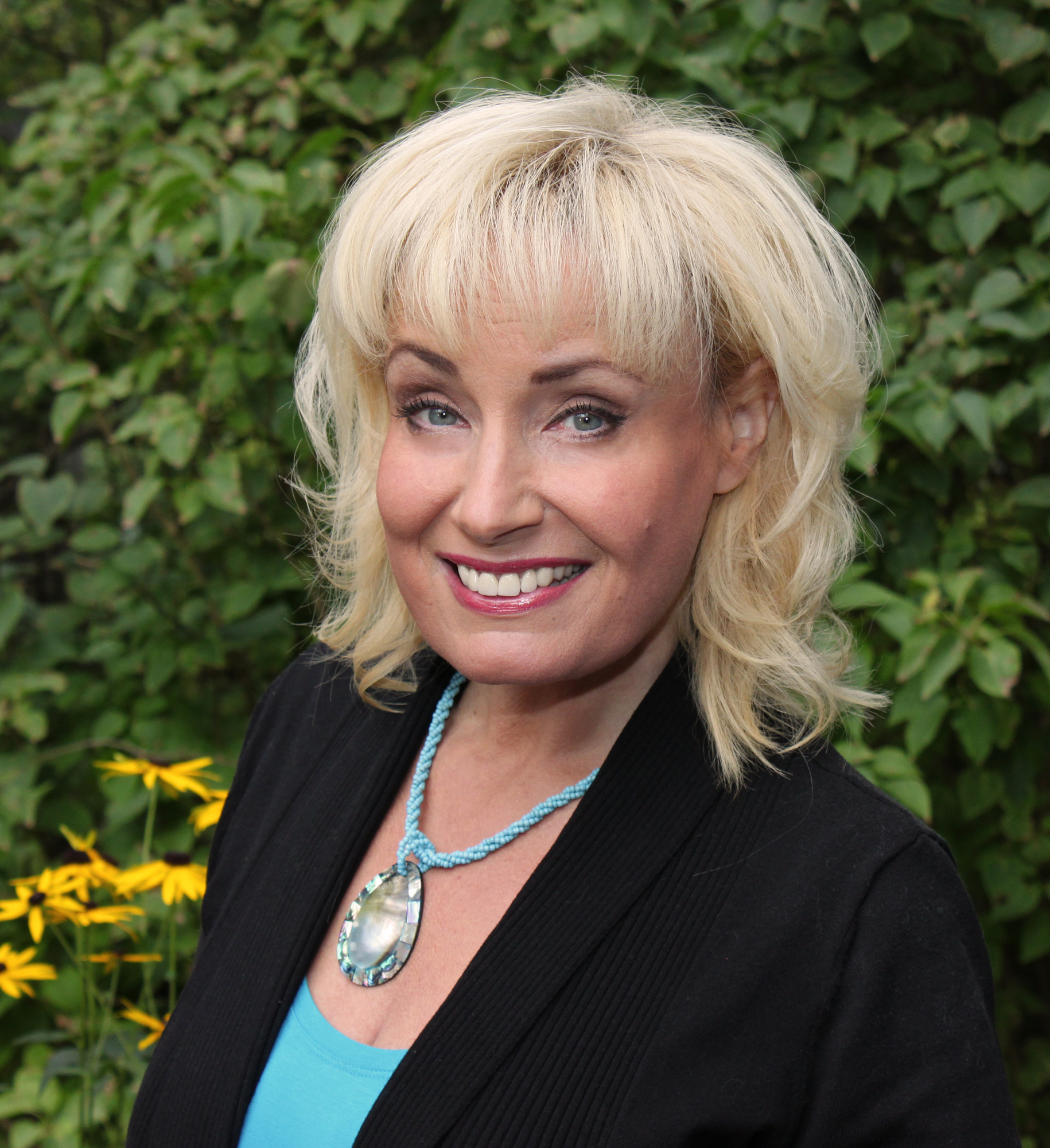
- Sonja Lumme in 2012.

Background information
- Born: 6 October 1961 (age 63); Kristinestad, Finland
- Occupation: singer

Sonja Lumme (born 6 October 1961, in Kristinestad) is a singer in Finland who represented her country in the Eurovision Song Contest 1985 in which she sang Eläköön elämä. She got 58 points and came 9th place overall. Lumme made further attempts to win for Finland, participating in the 1988 Finnish final and in 1989, she came fifth with "Rakkauden Laulut". Her final attempt was in 1992 with the song "Rakkauden bulevardi" which came third.

== Discography ==
- Pallo hallussa (1984)
- Maitoa, maitoa (1987)
- Kanavanvaihtaja (1988)
- Ilyas-Farris (1989)
- Hyvin menee, naapurit nauraa (1989)
- Helibori humpsis ja pokasaha soi (1990)
- Meitin Finland (1991)
- Bonjour kirvesvartta (1992)
- Ne halii meitin (1993)
- Tunti torvisoittoa (1994)
- Pure lenkki (1995)
- Parhaat (2000) (osittain samanlainen sisältö kuin vuonna 1989 ilmestyneessä Parhaat-kokoelmassa)
- Kun Eurojentalolla tanssittiin (2001)
- Me olemme taas (2003)

Preceded by Kirka with Hengaillaan	Finland in the Eurovision Song Contest; 1985	Succeeded by Kari Kuivalainen with Never The End
