= Cadillac (band) =

Spanish pop group

- Origin: Madrid, Spain
- Years active: 1981-1986
- Members: José María Guzmán; Eduardo Ramírez; Pedro Sánchez; Javier de Juan; Daniel Jacques; Pepe Marchante

Cadillac were a Spanish pop group, active between 1981 and 1986. They are known internationally for their participation in the 1986 Eurovision Song Contest.

The group was founded in Madrid in 1981 by José María Guzmán (vocals/guitar) and Eduardo Ramírez (vocals/bass). They recruited Pedro Sánchez (vocals/keyboards) and Javier de Juan (drums) to form a quartet. Their first album, Pensando en tí, was released later that year to critical approval but only modest sales.

Javier de Juan left the group in 1982 and was replaced by Daniel Jacques. Cadillac's second and third albums. Llegas de madrugada and Un día mas, also failed to sell in large quantities. Ramírez left the group, unhappy with decisions made by their record company, and Pepe Marchante came in as bassist. The group finally made a commercial breakthrough in 1985 with the album Funkyllac, which contained the hit single "Arturo" and featured harder rhythms which proved popular with record buyers.

In 1986, Cadillac were chosen by broadcaster Televisión Española as the Spanish representatives for the 31st Eurovision Song Contest with the Guzmán-composed song "Valentino". That year's contest took place on 3 May in Bergen, Norway, where "Valentino" placed tenth of the 20 entries.

Marchante left the group in 1986, and this ultimately led to their decision to disband later that year.

== Discography ==
- 1981: Pensando en ti
- 1983: Llegas de madrugada
- 1984: Un día mas
- 1985: Funkyllac
- 1986: Valentino

| Preceded by Paloma San Basilio with "La fiesta terminó" | Spain in the Eurovision Song Contest; 1986 | Succeeded by Patricia Kraus with "No estás solo" |
