= Germany in the Eurovision Song Contest 1985 =

- Eurovision Song Contest 1985
- Participating broadcaster: ARD (Note: Arbeitsgemeinschaft der öffentlich-rechtlichen Rundfunkanstalten der Bundesrepublik Deutschland) – Bayerischer Rundfunk (BR)
- Country: Germany
- Selection process: Ein Lied für Göteborg
- Selection date: 21 March 1985

Competing entry
- Song: "Für alle"
- Artist: Wind
- Songwriter: Hanne Haller

Placement
- Final result: 2nd, 105 points

Participation chronology

Germany was represented at the Eurovision Song Contest 1985 with the song "Für alle", written by Hanne Haller, and performed by the band Wind. The German participating broadcaster on behalf of ARD, Bayerischer Rundfunk (BR), selected their entry through a national final. This was the first of three appearances by Wind at Eurovision; they would also represent Germany in 1987 and 1992.

== Before Eurovision ==
=== Ein Lied für Göteborg ===
Bayerischer Rundfunk (BR) held the national final on 21 March 1985 at the Deutsches Theater in Munich, hosted by Wolfgang Mascher and Margit Geissler. 12 songs took part and the winner was chosen by a panel of approximately 500 people who had been selected as providing a representative cross-section of the German public.

R/O	Artist	Song	Songwriters	Votes	Place
1	Jürgen Renfordt	"Am Anfang der Zeit"	Charly Ricanek; Jürgen Renfordt; Horst-Herbert Krause	3,073	9
2	Susan Schubert	"Sehnsucht nach einem Gefühl"	Hanne Haller	2,994	10
3	Conny & Jean	"Du bist da"	Swetlana Minkow; Cora von dem Bottlenberg	2,982	11
4	Wolff Gerhard	"Also lebe ich"	Günther-Eric Thöner; Stephan Lego	3,572	3
5	Wind	"Für alle"	Hanne Haller	3,618	1
6	Heike Schäfer	"Die Glocken von Rom"	Ralph Siegel; Bernd Meinunger	3,597	2
7	MoMo	"So lange wir träumen, leben wir"	Jean Frankfurter	2,971	12
8	Sylvia	"König und Dame"	Andreas Bärtel; Tony Hendrik	3,113	8
9	Günther Stern	"Hier, da und überall"	Hanne Haller	3,291	6
10	Danny Fischer	"Kinder der Erde"	Joe Pöhlmann; Robert Jung	3,220	7
11	Caro Pukke	"Grün, grün, grün"	Ralph Siegel; Bernd Meinunger	3,535	4
12	Bernd Clüver	"Der Wind von Palermo"	Joachim Heider; Joachim Relin	3,424	5

== At Eurovision ==
On the night of the final Wind performed 10th in the running order, following Portugal and preceding Israel. At the close of voting "Für alle" had received 105 points, placing Germany second. The German jury awarded its 12 points to eventual contest winners Norway.

The contest was broadcast on Erstes Deutsches Fernsehen, with commentary by Ado Schlier. The show was watched by 13.22 million viewers in Germany.

=== Voting ===
Points awarded to Germany
Score	Country
12 points	Cyprus
10 points	Belgium; Denmark; Finland; Luxembourg; Spain
8 points	France; Norway; Sweden
7 points	Israel; Portugal
6 points	
5 points	
4 points	Ireland
3 points	
2 points	
1 point	United Kingdom

Points awarded by Germany
Score	Country
12 points	Norway
10 points	Austria
8 points	Sweden
7 points	Israel
6 points	Denmark
5 points	United Kingdom
4 points	Ireland
3 points	Luxembourg
2 points	Turkey
1 point	Switzerland
