= United Kingdom in the Eurovision Song Contest 1985 =

- Eurovision Song Contest 1985
- Participating broadcaster: British Broadcasting Corporation (BBC)
- Country: United Kingdom
- Selection process: A Song for Europe 1985
- Selection date: 9 April 1985

Competing entry
- Song: "Love Is"
- Artist: Vikki
- Songwriters: Jimmy Kaleth; Vikki Watson

Placement
- Final result: 4th, 100 points

Participation chronology

The United Kingdom was represented at the Eurovision Song Contest 1985 with the song "Love Is...", written by Jimmy Kaleth and Vikki Watson, and performed by Vikki herself. The British participating broadcaster, the British Broadcasting Corporation (BBC), selected its entry through a national final.

== Before Eurovision ==
=== A Song for Europe 1985 ===
The British Broadcasting Corporation (BBC) held the national final, A Song for Europe 1985, on 9 April 1985 at Studio 1 of the BBC Television Centre in London, hosted by a suited Terry Wogan. The BBC Concert Orchestra under the direction of John Coleman as conductor accompanied all the songs, but despite performing live, the orchestra was off-screen, behind the set.

In all, 333 songs were originally submitted to the Music Publisher's Association, with 8 songs chosen. Songwriters could only submit a maximum of two songs to the MPA, but the identity of the writers was not disclosed to the MPA judges. Due to the poor reception of the British entry in the previous year's Eurovision Song Contest, the BBC wanted to revert to the method used to select its entry used in 1964–1975 and approached both Bonnie Tyler and when she was unavailable, Lena Zavaroni to represent the United Kingdom and perform all the shortlisted songs in the national final. The MPA rebuffed the BBC's concept, wanting the composers and authors the option of choosing their own performers. A compromise rule was introduced, stating that no groups (more than 2 performers) were allowed to take part and writers would be limited to two entries each, however this rule was only in place for this one year. The songs were selected by around 90 people, DJs, producers and publishers.

Notable songwriters and performers included Paul Curtis who had had entries in the Eurovision final as well as a large number of previous entries in various British national finals, including writing the winning song in 1975. Despite the rule limiting song-writers to two entries, both his songs written with Graham Sacher reached the final eight. Together, Curtis and Sacher had won the A Song for Europe 1984 contest. 1970s glam rock singer Alvin Stardust (who had recently enjoyed a comeback in the charts) appeared as a performer as did Fiona Kennedy who was at the time a presenter of Record Breakers. Annabel was Annabel Layton who competed at A Song for Europe 1981 contest as part of Unity. Des Dyer had been the lead singer of the group 'Casablanca' who'd placed 3rd in the A Song for Europe 1983 contest.

==== Final ====
The show opened with a group of dancers, dancing to old Eurovision songs: "Making Your Mind Up", "Waterloo", "Puppet on a String", "Save Your Kisses for Me", "Boom Bang-a-Bang", and "Congratulations". The artists were introduced on stage with captions on screen, followed by presenter Terry Wogan. The songs had been first previewed in the previous week on the Wogan television show.

Nine regional juries located in Birmingham, Cardiff, Manchester, Belfast, Glasgow, London, Norwich, Plymouth and Bristol voted for the songs. Each jury region awarded 15, 12, 10, 9, 8, 7, 6 and 5 points to the songs.

A Song for Europe 1985 – 9 April 1985
R/O	Artist	Song	Songwriter(s)	Points	Place
1	Vikki	"Love Is..."	Jimmy Kaleth; Vikki Watson	124	1
2	Peter Beckett	"I'm Crying"	Jonathan Cregg	59	7
3	Alvin Stardust	"The Clock on the Wall"	Peter Vale; Mick Leeson	90	3
4	James Oliver	"What We Say With Our Eyes"	James Oliver	66	6
5	Des Dyer	"Energy"	Clive Scott; Des Dyer	77	4
6	Annabel	"Let Me Love You One More Time"	Paul Curtis; Graham Sacher	72	5
7	Kerri Wells	"Dancing in the Night"	Paul Curtis; Graham Sacher	101	2
8	Mike Redway and Fiona Kennedy	"So Do I"	Mike Redway	59	7

Detailed Jury Votes
R/O	Song	Belfast	Birmingham	Cardiff	Glasgow	London	Norwich	Bristol	Manchester	Plymouth	Total
1	"Love Is..."	15	15	10	15	15	12	15	12	15	124
2	"I'm Crying"	10	5	6	9	5	8	5	6	5	59
3	"The Clock on the Wall"	7	8	15	8	12	9	10	9	12	90
4	"What We Say With Our Eyes"	6	9	7	12	8	5	6	7	6	66
5	"Energy"	9	10	12	7	7	6	9	8	9	77
6	"Let Me Love You One More Time"	5	7	8	10	6	10	8	10	8	72
7	"Dancing in the Night"	12	12	9	6	10	15	12	15	10	101
8	"So Do I"	8	6	5	5	9	7	7	5	7	59
Jury Spokespersons
Belfast – Jim Neilly; Birmingham – Paul Coia; Cardiff – Iwan Thomas; Glasgow – Viv Lumsden; London – Colin Berry; Norwich – Stewart White; Bristol – Vivien Creegor; Manchester – John Mundy; Plymouth – Christopher Slade

== At Eurovision ==
"Love Is..." performed by Vikki finished in fourth place, gaining 100 points overall, at the Eurovision Song Contest 1985. Although the song did not receive any country's twelve points, it still managed to score with every jury but one (Cyprus). The British jury awarded their twelve points to the eventual winners, Norway's "La det swinge" by Bobbysocks!.

The final was broadcast on BBC 1 with Terry Wogan providing the commentary, Wogan actually commentated from BBC TV Centre in London as he was suffering from flu and was unable to fly to Gothenburg. BBC Radio 2 again decided not to broadcast the contest, but the contest was broadcast on British Forces Radio with commentary provided by Richard Nankivell. The BBC appointed Colin Berry as its spokesperson to announce the British jury vote.

The contest was watched by 12.05 million viewers.

=== Voting ===
Points awarded to the United Kingdom
Score	Country
12 points	
10 points	Switzerland; Turkey
8 points	Italy; Luxembourg
7 points	Finland; Norway
6 points	Belgium; France; Portugal
5 points	Denmark; Germany; Ireland; Spain
4 points	Greece; Sweden
3 points	
2 points	Austria; Israel
1 point	

Points awarded by the United Kingdom
Score	Country
12 points	Norway
10 points	Austria
8 points	Turkey
7 points	Finland
6 points	Sweden
5 points	Israel
4 points	Spain
3 points	Ireland
2 points	France
1 point	Germany
