= Turkey in the Eurovision Song Contest 1985 =

- Eurovision Song Contest 1985
- Participating broadcaster: Turkish Radio and Television Corporation (TRT)
- Country: Turkey
- Selection process: 9. Eurovision Şarkı Yarışması Türkiye Finali
- Selection date: 1 March 1985

Competing entry
- Song: "Didai didai dai"
- Artist: MFÖ
- Songwriters: Mazhar Alanson; Fuat Güner; Özkan Uğur

Placement
- Final result: 14th, 36 points

Participation chronology

Turkey was represented at the Eurovision Song Contest 1985 with the song "Didai didai dai", written by Mazhar Alanson, Fuat Güner, and Özkan Uğur, and performed by themselves under their stage name MFÖ. The Turkish participating broadcaster, the Turkish Radio and Television Corporation (TRT), selected its entry through a national final.

== Before Eurovision ==
=== 9. Eurovision Şarkı Yarışması Türkiye Finali ===
The Turkish Radio and Television Corporation (TRT) held the national final on 1 March 1985 at the Istanbul Atatürk Kültür Merkezi in Istanbul, hosted by Başak Doğru and Orhan Boran. Nine songs competed and the winner was determined by an expert jury.

Final – 1 March 1985
| R/O | Artist | Song | Lyricist | Composer | Place |
|---|---|---|---|---|---|
| 1 | Neco & Nükhet Duru | "Bir Sevgi Yeter" | Ayşe Irmak Manioğlu | Selmi Andak | —N/a |
| 2 | Mahzar Fuat Özkan | "Aşık Oldum" | Mazhar Alanson | Mazhar Alanson; Fuat Güner; Özkan Uğur | 1 |
| 3 | Neco & Nükhet Duru | "Boşver" | Nükhet Duru | Uğur Başar | —N/a |
| 4 | Pınar Seyhun | "Bakışlar" | Pınar Seyhun; Tamer Aykaç | Coşkun Ömer Göksel | —N/a |
| 5 | Sezen Aksu & Özdemir Erdoğan | "Küçük Bir Aşk Masalı" | Sezen Aksu; Hıncal Uluç | Ali Kocatepe | —N/a |
| 6 | Feza Tok | "Özlem" | Beyza Tok | | —N/a |
| 7 | Neco & Nükhet Duru | "Sev" | Olcayto Ahmet Tuğsuz | | 2 |
| 8 | Nil Burak | "Güneş Bir Kere Doğdu" | Aysel Gürel | Selmi Andak | 3 |
| 9 | Neco & Nükhet Duru | "Yıllardan Sonra" | Olcayto Ahmet Tuğsuz | | —N/a |

== At Eurovision ==
The contest was broadcast on TRT Televizyon.

On the night of the contest Mahzar Fuat Özkan performed 7th in the running order following France and preceding Belgium. The name of the trio was announced as MFÖ (abbreviated for Mahzar Fuat Özkan) and the name of the song as "Didai didai dai". The song was also arranged for the big orchestra by Garo Mafyan. At the close of the voting Didai Didai Dai had received 36 points placing Turkey 14th. 8 participants had voted for Didai Didai Dai. The Turkish jury awarded its 12 points to Spain.

=== Voting ===
Points awarded to Turkey
| Score | Country |
|---|---|
| 12 points | Switzerland |
| 10 points | |
| 8 points | United Kingdom |
| 7 points | Ireland |
| 6 points | |
| 5 points | |
| 4 points | |
| 3 points | Spain |
| 2 points | Finland; Germany |
| 1 point | Belgium; Norway |

Points awarded by Turkey
| Score | Country |
|---|---|
| 12 points | Spain |
| 10 points | United Kingdom |
| 8 points | Italy |
| 7 points | Belgium |
| 6 points | Switzerland |
| 5 points | Ireland |
| 4 points | Sweden |
| 3 points | Finland |
| 2 points | Portugal |
| 1 point | France |
