= Switzerland in the Eurovision Song Contest 1985 =

- Eurovision Song Contest 1985
- Participating broadcaster: Swiss Broadcasting Corporation (SRG SSR)
- Country: Switzerland
- Selection process: Concours Eurovision de la Chanson 1985
- Selection date: 23 February 1985

Competing entry
- Song: "Piano, piano"
- Artist: Mariella Farré and Pino Gasparini
- Songwriters: Anita Kerr; Trudi Müller-Bosshard

Placement
- Final result: 12th, 39 points

Participation chronology

Switzerland was represented at the Eurovision Song Contest 1985 with the song "Piano, piano", composed by Anita Kerr, with lyrics by Trudi Müller-Bosshard, and performed by Mariella Farré and Pino Gasparini. The Swiss participating broadcaster, the Swiss Broadcasting Corporation (SRG SSR), selected its entry for the contest through a national final.

== Before Eurovision ==
=== Regional selections ===
The Swiss Broadcasting Corporation (SRG SSR) held a national final to select its entry for the Eurovision Song Contest 1985. The national final was a collaboration between three broadcasters that comprised SRG SSR: the Swiss-German and Romansh broadcaster Schweizer Fernsehen der deutschen und rätoromanischen Schweiz (SF DRS), the Swiss-French broadcaster Télévision suisse romande (TSR), and the Swiss-Italian broadcaster Televisione svizzera di lingua italiana (TSI). Since 1982, unlike previous Swiss national finals, where all composite broadcasters internally selected their entries, a public preliminary round was held by one of the regional broadcasters. TSI and SF DRS held preselections to select their three entries, while TSR internally selected its entries.

==== Il Suonatutto ====
The Swiss-Italian preselection was held and broadcast on radio on 10 December 1984 at 20:00 CET as part of the program Il Suonatutto. Seven songs participated, with the three highest scoring songs advancing to the national final. The voting system consisted of a public jury of radio listeners who voted via telephone and an "expert" jury. Applications for voters were required to be sent as postcards until 3 December.

Among the participants was Rainy Day, who represented Switzerland in 1984.

Il Suonatutto — 10 December 1984
Artist(s)	Song	Songwriter(s)		Result
Artist(s)	Song	Composer	Lyricist	Result
Andy L.	"La colomba bianca"	Andy Lütolf		—N/a
Friends	"Europeo"	Corry Knobel		Qualified
Marisa Frigerio	"Serenità"	Marisa Frigerio		—N/a
Pullover	"Ancora mia"	Gfeller Flückiger		—N/a
Rainy Day	"Gioventù"	Nella Martinetti	Hans Gmür; Nella Martinetti	Qualified
Renato Mascetti	"Una notte a Casablanca"	Renato Mascetti		Qualified
Sandro Di Bello	"Non c'è rosa senza spine"	Fausto Franchini		—N/a

==== Ein Lied für Schweden: Concours de l'Eurovision 1985 ====
Ein Lied für Schweden: Concours de l'Eurovision 1985, the SF DRS preselection, was held and broadcast on radio on 15 December 1984 at 20:00 (CET) on DRS 1 and RTS 2 and was held in Beromünster. Songwriters from Switzerland and Liechtenstein were able to submit songs for Mariella Farré (who represented Switzerland in 1983), Pino Gasparini (who represented Switzerland in 1977 as part of the Pepe Lienhard Group), and the Martin Richard Trio. Nine songs were selected to compete in the event— three for each artist. The Swiss-German and Romansh viewers then voted to decide which songs would qualify to the final.

The songs that advanced to the national final were "Pierrot", written by Waltraud Battaglia and Markus Ellenberger for Mariella Farré, "Piano, piano", written by Anita Kerr and Trudi Müller-Bosshard for both Farré and Pino Gasparini, and "Der Kuckuck", written by Marcel Bless and the Acid Cider Band for the Martin Richard Trio.

No information is currently known about the remaining song titles and their songwriters, however, it is reported that the songwriters who failed to qualify criticized this process because the artists did not connect or identify with their songs.

=== Concours Eurovision de la Chanson 1985 ===
TSR staged the national final on 23 February 1985 at 21:10 (CET) in its studios in Geneva. It was hosted by Serge Moisson, with Le Groupe Instrumental Romand accompanying the performances. Les Compagnons de l'Arche featuring Hana Lamkova and the Black Theater of Prague made guest appearances.

Among the participants were Arlette Zola (who represented Switzerland in 1982), Rainy Day (who represented Switzerland in 1984), and Daniela Simons (who would later represent Switzerland in 1986). The Martin Richard Trio was renamed to 'Swiss Singers' and became a duo.

Participating entries
Broadcaster	Artist(s)	Song	Songwriter(s)		Language
Broadcaster	Artist(s)	Song	Composer(s)	Lyricist(s)	Language
RTSI	Friends	"Europeo"	Corry Knobel		Italian
RTSI	Rainy Day	"Gioventù"	Nella Martinetti	Hans Gmür; Nella Martinetti	Italian
RTSI	Renato Mascetti	"Una notte a Casablanca"	Renato Mascetti		Italian
SF DRS	Mariella Farré	"Pierrot"	Markus Ellenberger	Markus Ellenberger; Waltraud Battaglia	German
SF DRS	Mariella Farré and Pino Gasparini	"Piano, piano"	Anita Kerr	Trudi Müller-Bosshard	German
SF DRS	Swiss Singers	"Der Kuckuck"	Acid Cider Band; Marcel Bless	Marcel Bless	German
TSR	Arlette Zola	"Aime-moi"	Pietro Silvestri		French
TSR	Daniela Simons	"Repars à zéro"	Daniela Simons		French
TSR	Nicky Nicolas	"Je n'aime que toi"	Franco Bussmann	Nicky Nicolas	French

The voting consisted of regional public votes which were sent to the three divisions of SRG SSR (DRS, TSR, TSI: German, French, and Italian speaking, respectively), a press jury, and an "expert" jury. Applications for viewers to join the regional juries were sent via postcard until 17 February, and 50 viewers from each canton were randomly selected to cast their votes to their broadcaster divisions via phone call. Additionally, one random voter in the public jury would be drawn to be invited to attend the Eurovision Song Contest as an audience member along with a companion. The selected voter was K. Mauser. The winner was the song "Piano, piano", composed by Anita Kerr with lyrics from Trudi Müller-Bosshard and performed by Mariella Farré and Pino Gasparini.

Final — 23 February 1985
R/O	Artist(s)	Song	Regional Juries			Press Jury	Expert Jury	Total	Place
R/O	Artist(s)	Song	DRS	TSR	TSI	Press Jury	Expert Jury	Total	Place
1	Rainy Day	"Gioventù"	3	5	8	8	6	30	4
2	Nicky Nicolas	"Je n'aime que toi"	1	3	1	2	1	8	9
3	Mariella Farré	"Pierrot"	5	4	2	6	5	22	7
4	Friends	"Europeo"	4	2	4	3	8	21	8
5	Mariella Farré and Pino Gasparini	"Piano, piano"	8	7	6	10	4	35	1
6	Arlette Zola	"Aime-moi"	7	8	7	7	2	31	3
7	Daniela Simons	"Repars à zéro"	6	6	5	5	10	32	2
8	Swiss Singers	"Der Kuckuck"	10	10	3	1	3	27	5
9	Renato Mascetti	"Una notte a Casablanca"	2	1	10	4	7	24	6

== At Eurovision ==
At the Eurovision Song Contest 1985, held at the Scandinavium in Gothenburg, the Swiss entry was the fifteenth entry of the night following the United Kingdom and preceding Sweden. The Swiss conductor at the contest was Anita Kerr, who composed the song. Additionally, she was one of the only three female conductors in the history of Eurovision Song Contest. At the close of voting, Switzerland had received 39 points in total; finishing in twelfth place out of nineteen countries.

=== Voting ===
Each participating broadcaster assembled a jury panel with at least eleven members. The jurors awarded 1-8, 10, and 12 points to their top ten songs.

Points awarded to Switzerland
Score	Country
12 points	
10 points	
8 points	
7 points	
6 points	Denmark; Turkey
5 points	Belgium; Norway
4 points	Portugal
3 points	Finland; Greece
2 points	Cyprus; Luxembourg
1 point	Austria; Germany; Sweden

Points awarded by Switzerland
Score	Country
12 points	Turkey
10 points	United Kingdom
8 points	Sweden
7 points	Israel
6 points	Norway
5 points	Ireland
4 points	France
3 points	Cyprus
2 points	Finland
1 point	Austria
