= Denmark in the Eurovision Song Contest 1985 =

- Eurovision Song Contest 1985
- Participating broadcaster: Danmarks Radio (DR)
- Country: Denmark
- Selection process: Dansk Melodi Grand Prix 1985
- Selection date: 9 March 1985

Competing entry
- Song: "Sku' du spørg' fra no'en?"
- Artist: Hot Eyes
- Songwriters: Søren Bundgaard; Keld Heick

Placement
- Final result: 11th, 41 points

Participation chronology

Denmark was represented at the Eurovision Song Contest 1985 with the song "Sku' du spørg' fra no'en?", composed by Søren Bundgaard, with lyrics by Keld Heick, and performed by Hot Eyes. The Danish participating broadcaster, Danmarks Radio (DR), organised the Dansk Melodi Grand Prix 1985 in order to select its entry for the contest. This was the second consecutive Eurovision appearance for the duo.

== Before Eurovision ==
=== Dansk Melodi Grand Prix 1985 ===
Danmarks Radio (DR) held the Dansk Melodi Grand Prix 1985 on 9 March at the ASA Filmudlejning studios in Lyngby-Taarbæk, hosted by Jørgen de Mylius. Ten songs took part with the winner being decided by voting from five regional juries. Other participants included DMGP institution Tommy Seebach, Gry Johansen who represented Denmark in 1983, and Lise Haavik (Trax) who would represent Denmark in 1986. The national final was also broadcast in Greenland's KNR-TV.

Final – 9 March 1985
R/O	Artist	Song	Songwriter(s)	Points	Place
1	Anne Lerskov	"Længsel"	Ralph Levitan; Fini Jaworski	19	8
2	Carsten Lehn	"Lady Fantasi"	Carsten Lehn; Juliet Lehn	23	7
3	Boulevard	"Si' at du ka' li' mig"	Poul Dehnhardt; Dennis Dehnhardt; Lennart Johannessen	27	5
4	Tommy Seebach	"Det' det jeg altid har sagt"	Tommy Seebach; Keld Heick	50	2
5	Trax	"Ved du hva' du sku'"	John Hatting; Keld Heick	39	3
6	X-Tasy	"Sommer rendez-vous"	Carsten Lehn; Ivan Pedersen	32	4
7	Hanne Boel, Lise Dandanell and Tommy Kenter	"Piano"	Tommy Kenter	7	10
8	J.P. West	"En tropisk drøm"	J.P. West; Sys Westerlund	12	9
9	Kirsten and Søren	"Sku' du spørg' fra no'en?"	Søren Bundgaard; Keld Heick	58	1
10	Gry and Vivian	"Vi ska' leve"	Vivian Johansen	25	6

Detailed Regional Jury Votes
R/O	Song	West Jutland	East Jutland	Funen, Lolland-Falster, and Bornholm	Zealand	Capital Region	Total
1	"Længsel"	3	4	5	5	2	19
2	"Lady Fantasi"	5	6	6	2	4	23
3	"Si' at du ka' li' mig"	4	5	3	8	7	27
4	"Det' det jeg altid har sagt"	10	10	10	12	8	50
5	"Ved du hva' du sku'"	6	7	8	8	10	39
6	"Sommer rendez-vous"	8	8	7	3	6	32
7	"Piano"	1	1	1	1	3	7
8	"En tropisk drøm"	2	3	2	4	1	12
9	"Sku' du spørg' fra no'en?"	12	12	12	10	12	58
10	"Vi ska' leve"	7	3	4	6	5	25

== At Eurovision ==
On the night of the final Hot Eyes performed 4th in the running order, following Cyprus and preceding Spain. At the close of voting "Sku' du spørg' fra no'en?" had received 41 points, placing Denmark 11th of the 19 entries. The Danish jury awarded its 12 points to contest winners Norway.

The contest was broadcast on DR TV, with commentary by Jørgen de Mylius.

=== Voting ===
Points awarded to Denmark
Score	Country
12 points	
10 points	France
8 points	
7 points	
6 points	Germany; Norway
5 points	Austria; Sweden
4 points	
3 points	Belgium; Cyprus
2 points	Italy
1 point	Portugal

Points awarded by Denmark
Score	Country
12 points	Norway
10 points	Germany
8 points	Sweden
7 points	Austria
6 points	Switzerland
5 points	United Kingdom
4 points	Israel
3 points	Ireland
2 points	Luxembourg
1 point	Italy
