= Maria Doyle-Cuche =

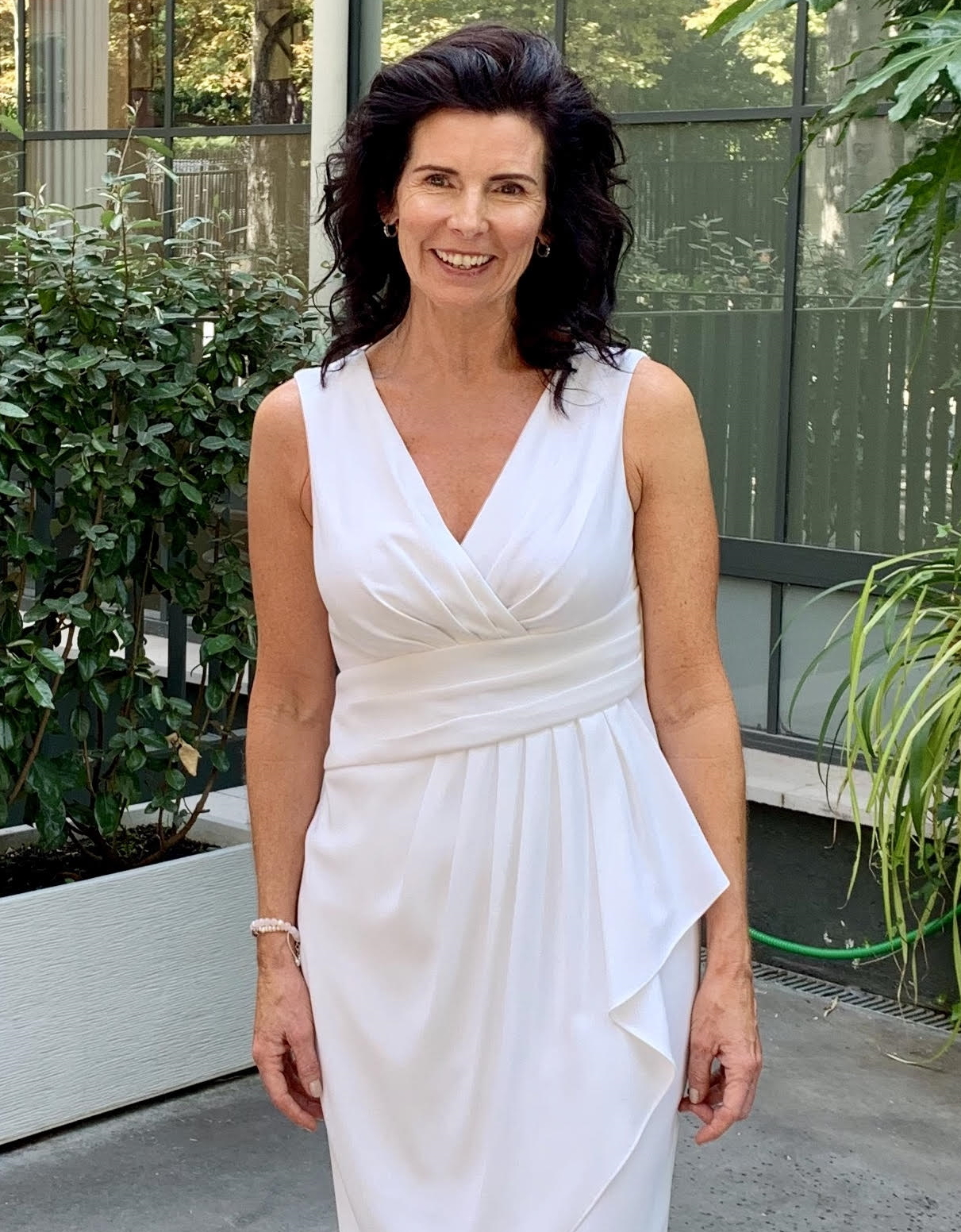
- Maria Doyle-Cuche (Paris, 2019).

Background information
- Also known as: Maria Christian; Maria Doyle; Maria Cuche
- Born: Maria McCabe; 6 May 1965 (age 61)
- Origin: Dundalk, County Louth, Ireland
- Occupation: Singer
- Years active: 1985, 2016–present

Maria Doyle-Cuche (born 6 May 1965) is an Irish singer who represented Ireland in the Eurovision Song Contest 1985. In 2016, she auditioned for The Voice of Ireland, and was selected by coach Una Foden in the audition round. In 2020, she took part of The Voice France, in which she went to the semi-finals coached by Lara Fabian. Since the age of nine, Maria has been 95% legally blind. She is the author of an autobiographical book in French entitled "On ne voit bien qu’avec le cœur" (One Can Only Truly See with the Heart, 2018).

== Biography ==
=== Childhood ===
She was born in 1965 in Dundalk, Ireland, to a poverty-stricken mother in a mother and baby home. Affected by Stargardt's genetic disease, she lost her eyesight at the age of nine but nevertheless wanted to become a singer. At the age of thirteen, her vocal talents were spotted by an American lady who raised funds for her to travel to the United States for musical training.

=== Career ===
At the age of 19, she represented her native country Ireland in the Eurovision Song Contest under the name Maria Christian in which she sang "Wait Until The Weekend Comes" written by Brendan Graham. She earned 91 points and came in at 6th place. "Wait Until The Weekend Comes" reached number 15 in the Irish charts. Her follow-up single "Star" reached number 30 in the Irish charts in December 1985.

She married a Frenchman, Emmanuel Cuche, and settled with him in the early 1990s in Chanteheux, near Lunéville, in Lorraine. From this union were born seven children: Emmanuel, Shannon, Brian, Stéphanie, Tara, Molly and Emma. All of them became musicians in their turn, playing different instruments: piano, violin, cello, flute and guitar. In 2009, she was awarded the "French Family Medal" and in 2019 the "French Family Prize" awarded by the Stanislas Academy of Nancy.

After a number of years devoted to her family, she returned to the world of singing. In 2016, performing under her married name Maria Cuche, she took part in the programme The Voice of Ireland. She repeated the experience in 2020 in the French programme The Voice, in which she was coached by Lara Fabian. During The Voice France, she sang the Irish traditional song "Danny Boy" accompanied by all her children for the blind auditions, then "You Raise Me Up" from Secret Garden (Battles) and "Memory" from Barbra Streisand (knock-outs). She made it to the semi-finals where sang Edith Piaf’s "Hymne à l'amour" accompanied by her two eldest children: Emmanuel on the piano and Shannon on the violin.

She is also a lecturer; she participated in a TEDx talk in particular, which was the starting point for an autobiographical work, "On ne voit bien qu’avec le cœur" (One Can Only Truly See with the Heart) published by Plon under the name Maria Doyle.

She was chosen to participate in the Virtual Reception of the Irish Embassy in Paris on 17 March 2021. Accompanied by her son, Emmanuel, on piano, she sang "You Raise Me Up". In 2024, she was invited at a reception in her honor at Áras an Uachtaráin in Ireland and became the first French woman to receive the Presidential Distinguished Service Award from the Irish President.

== Bibliography ==
- 2018 : On ne voit bien qu'avec le coeur (One Can Only Truly See with the Heart)

Awards and achievements
Preceded by Linda Martin with "Terminal 3"	Ireland in the Eurovision Song Contest; 1985	Succeeded by Luv Bug with "You Can Count on Me"
