= Fede Finn & Funny Boyz =

Danish band

Fede Finn and Funny Boyz (or in Danish language Fede Finn og Funny Boyz) is a Danish country music-inspired pop band and dansband signed to Beach Record label. The band was founded by Lennart Johannesen and has been active in dance halls and night venues for four decades and has had a number of cult songs made famous by the band as well as covers of well known country and non-country hits. The band has taken part in a number of festivals. It has also released a number of charting albums.

Maud Kofod has joined the band as a lead singer.

The band was featured in the thriller film Fri os fra det onde directed by Ole Bornedal.

== Discography ==
Year	Album	Peak positions	Certification
Year	Album	DEN	Certification
2007	De fedeste	1	
2008	Første gang til gode	5	
2009	Klassikere på den fede måde	10	
2010	Nu med kavalergang (Compilation album)	6	
2013	Fed fornemmelse	26	
2013	Beautybox (Compilation album)	17	
