= Ireland in the Eurovision Song Contest 1985 =

- Eurovision Song Contest 1985
- Participating broadcaster: Radio Telefís Éireann (RTÉ)
- Country: Ireland
- Selection process: National Song Contest
- Selection date: 27 March 1985

Competing entry
- Song: "Wait Until the Weekend Comes"
- Artist: Maria Christian
- Songwriter: Brendan Graham

Placement
- Final result: 6th, 91 points

Participation chronology

Ireland was represented at the Eurovision Song Contest 1985 with the song "Wait Until the Weekend Comes", written by Brendan Graham, and performed by Maria Christian. The Irish participating broadcaster, Radio Telefís Éireann (RTÉ), selected its entry through a national final.

== Before Eurovision ==
=== National Song Contest ===
Radio Telefís Éireann (RTÉ) held the twentieth edition of the National Song Contest on 27 March 1985 at its studios in Dublin, hosted by Gay Byrne. Eight songs took part, with the winner chosen by voting from 11 regional juries. One of the contenders was Marion Fossett, who was a member of Ireland's 1981 representatives Sheeba.

R/O	Artist	Song	Points	Place
1	Carol Ann	"Two Hearts"	20	2
2	Marion Fossett	"Only a Fantasy"	7	6
3	Jody McStravick	"Couldn't Live My Life"	15	4
4	Jacinta Whyte	"The Circus Song"	6	7
5	Jane Cassidy	"Long Before"	16	3
6	Mike Sherrard	"Hearts"	3	8
7	Trish O'Brien	"Hold Her Now"	15	4
8	Maria Christian	"Wait Until the Weekend Comes"	28	1

Detailed Regional Jury Votes
R/O	Song	Dublin Regional	Castleblaney	Donegal	Westport	Galway	Birr	Limerick	Kenmare	Cork	Waterford	Dublin Central	Total
1	"Two Hearts"		2	3			1	4	1	1	4	4	20
2	"Only a Fantasy"			3		2		1		1			7
3	"Couldn't Live My Life"	6	1		3		4				1		15
4	"The Circus Song"	2		1		1	1					1	6
5	"Long Before"	1				1			7		3	4	16
6	"Hearts"		3										3
7	"Hold Her Now"		1	1	2			4	2	2	2	1	15
8	"Wait Until the Weekend Comes"	1	3	2	5	6	4	1		6			28

== At Eurovision ==
On the night of the final Christian performed first in the running order, preceding Finland. At the close of voting "Wait Until the Weekend Comes" had picked up 91 points, placing Ireland 6th of the 19 entries. The Irish jury awarded its 12 points to contest winners Norway.

=== Voting ===
Points awarded to Ireland
Score	Country
12 points	Italy
10 points	Austria
8 points	Belgium; Israel; Portugal
7 points	Cyprus; Sweden
6 points	
5 points	Switzerland; Turkey
4 points	Germany; Spain
3 points	Denmark; France; Norway; United Kingdom
2 points	
1 point	Finland

Points awarded by Ireland
Score	Country
12 points	Norway
10 points	Sweden
8 points	Israel
7 points	Turkey
6 points	Finland
5 points	United Kingdom
4 points	Germany
3 points	Austria
2 points	Spain
1 point	Cyprus
