= France in the Eurovision Song Contest 1985 =

- Eurovision Song Contest 1985
- Participating broadcaster: Antenne 2
- Country: France
- Selection process: National final
- Selection date: 31 March 1985

Competing entry
- Song: "Femme dans ses rêves aussi"
- Artist: Roger Bens
- Songwriter: Didier Pascalis

Placement
- Final result: 10th, 56 points

Participation chronology

France was represented at the Eurovision Song Contest 1985 with the song "Femme dans ses rêves aussi", written by Didier Pascalis, and performed by Roger Bens. The French participating broadcaster, Antenne 2, selected its entry through a national final.

== Before Eurovision ==
=== National final ===
Antenne 2 held the national final on 31 March 1985, hosted by Patrice Laffont and Catherine Ceylac. Fourteen songs took part with the winner chosen by a panel of TV viewers who were telephoned and asked to vote on the songs.

R/O	Artist	Song	Points	Place
1	Les Jumelles	"Notre symphonie"	30	11
2	Roger Bens	"Femme dans ses rêves aussi"	215	1
3	Lucille Marciano	"Pour ne pas oublier les hommes"	52	9
4	Julia Romagne	"Dolly"	80	6
5	Florence Minet	"Le cœur made in amour"	99	4
6	Florence Allora	"C'est un sorcier"	63	8
7	Pascal Renard	"Mary Jackson"	22	12
8	Sarah d'Armento	"Zoom avant"	10	14
9	Henri de Vézins	"Amour non-stop"	17	13
10	3+1	"Paris la France"	76	7
11	Betty Dian	"Le jour où tu reviendras"	121	2
12	Françoise Robert	"Only you, que vous"	103	3
13	Irka and Denis Pépin	"Quelque chose me dit"	89	5
14	Nadine Séra	"Un autre jour, une autre chance"	39	10

== At Eurovision ==
On the night of the final Bens performed 6th in the running order, following Spain and preceding Turkey. At the close of voting "Femme dans ses rêves aussi" had received 56 points, placing France 10th of the 19 entries. The French jury awarded its 12 points to Israel.

=== Voting ===
Points awarded to France
Score	Country
12 points	Greece
10 points	Italy
8 points	
7 points	
6 points	Sweden
5 points	Finland
4 points	Cyprus; Switzerland
3 points	Austria; Israel; Luxembourg; Portugal
2 points	United Kingdom
1 point	Turkey

Points awarded by France
Score	Country
12 points	Israel
10 points	Denmark
8 points	Germany
7 points	Sweden
6 points	United Kingdom
5 points	Italy
4 points	Luxembourg
3 points	Ireland
2 points	Norway
1 point	Austria
