= Jokke Seppälä =

Finnish musician (1953–2026)

- Born: 24 June 1953
- Died: 5 June 2026 (aged 72)
- Genre: Rock
- Occupation: Musician
- Instruments: Singing, guitar
- Formerly of: Session

Jorma Voitto Juhani Seppälä (24 June 1953 – 5 June 2026) was a Finnish musician.

== Life and career ==
Seppälä's recording career began in the early 1970s in the rock band Session. From the session in 1980, Jokke participated in the Autumn Tune competition with the song "Lauantaiyö" and released his solo album Move on. At this time, Seppälä also had a band together with Pepe Willberg. His second solo album, Find my girl, was released in 1982.

In the 1980s, Seppälä often appeared on television as a backing choir singer in the Eurovision Song Contest (1983–1986 and 1989). He also appeared on the television show Fredagpörssi and participated in the Eurovision Song Contest qualifiers in 1985 and 1986. In 1985, Seppälä sang Pave Maijanen's song "Jossain", and the following year, Seppälä's own song "Kaamoksen maa" was included.

In 1991, Seppälä composed the song "Pienesta kii" for Samuli Edelmann, which came second in the Autumn Tune Contest and became a hit. In addition to commercial music (including works for K-Supermarket), Seppälä composed songs for many other artists and produced, among other things, two albums by The Kids and albums by Kurre, Jaana Lammi and Marjorie.

Seppälä died on 5 June 2026, at the age of 72.
