= Eurovision Song Contest 1985 =

International song competition

Date and venue
- Final: 4 May 1985
- Venue: Scandinavium; Gothenburg, Sweden

Organisation
- Organiser: European Broadcasting Union (EBU)
- Scrutineer: Frank Naef

Production
- Host broadcaster: Sveriges Television (SVT)
- Director: Steen Priwin
- Executive producer: Steen Priwin
- Musical director: Curt-Eric Holmquist
- Presenter: Lill Lindfors

Participants
- Number of entries: 19
- Returning countries: Greece; Israel
- Non-returning countries: Netherlands; Yugoslavia
- Participation map: Competing countries Countries that participated in the past but not in 1985

Vote
- Voting system: Each country awarded 12, 10, 8-1 point(s) to their 10 favourite songs
- Winning song: Norway "La det swinge"

The Eurovision Song Contest 1985 was the 30th edition of the Eurovision Song Contest, held on 4 May 1985 at the Scandinavium in Gothenburg, Sweden, and presented by Lill Lindfors. It was organised by the European Broadcasting Union (EBU) and host broadcaster Sveriges Television (SVT), who staged the event after winning the 1984 contest for Sweden with the song "Diggi-Loo Diggi-Ley" by Herreys. Broadcasters from nineteen countries participated in the contest; Greece and Israel returned after a one-year absence, while the Netherlands and Yugoslavia, which had participated in the previous year's event, declined to enter due to separate memorial events in those countries coinciding with the date of the contest.

The winner was Norway with the song "La det swinge", composed and written by Rolf Løvland and performed by the group Bobbysocks. This was Norway's first contest victory, and only the third top five placing for a country which had placed last on six previous occasions, including three times receiving nul points. With a total of 123 points, "La det swinge" remains the lowest scoring winner under the voting system used between 1975 and 2015. Germany, Sweden, the United Kingdom, and Israel rounded out the top five positions.

== Location ==
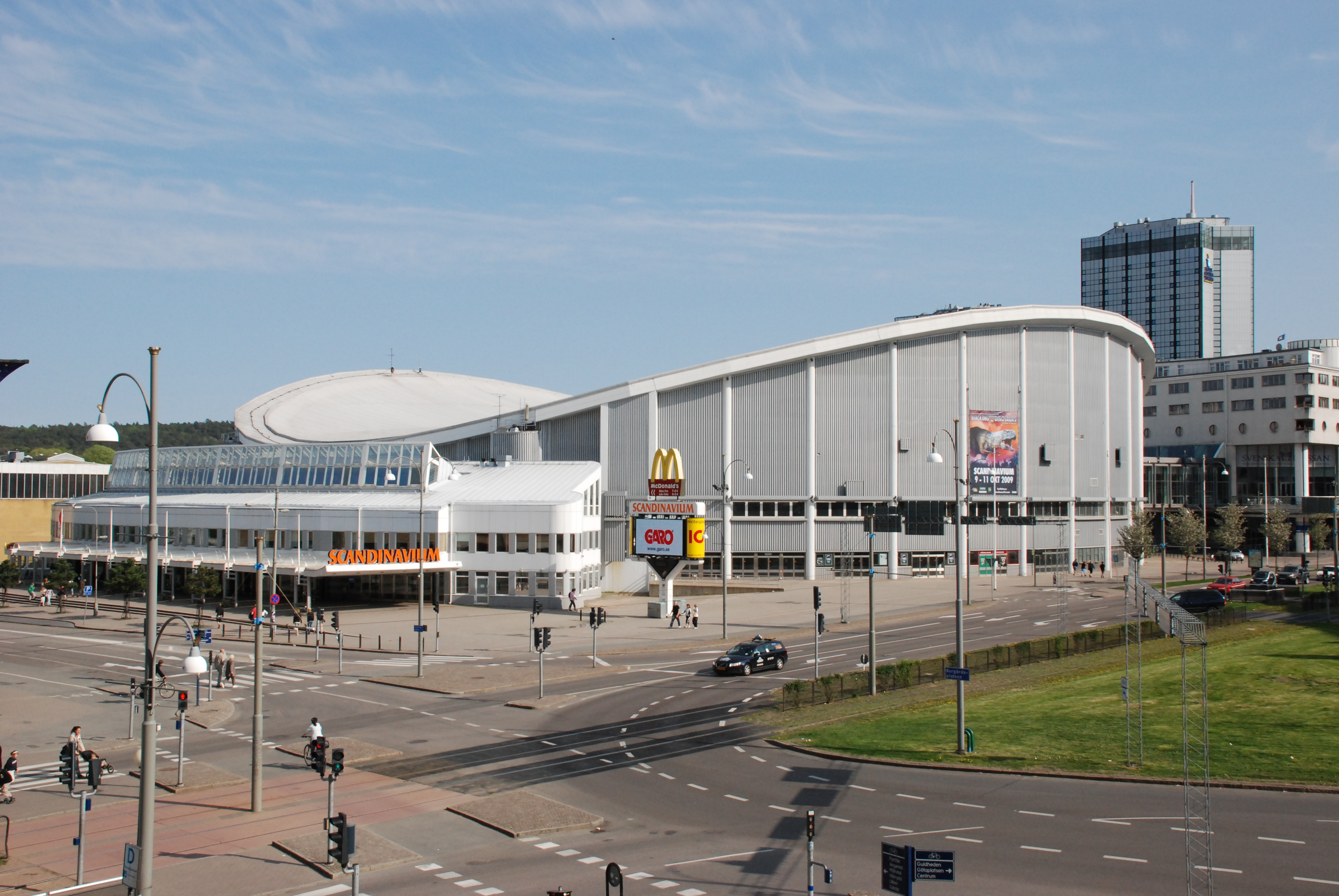
Scandinavium, Gothenburg – host venue of the 1985 contest

The 1985 contest took place in Gothenburg, Sweden, following the country's victory at the 1984 contest with the song "Diggi-Loo Diggi-Ley" performed by Herreys. It was the second time that Sweden had hosted the event, ten years after the 1975 contest was held in Stockholm. The chosen venue was the Scandinavium, an indoor arena inaugurated in 1971, home to the Frölunda HC ice hockey team and the Gothenburg Horse Show. The Scandinavium was chosen by host broadcaster Sveriges Television (SVT) from a number of bids submitted by various Swedish cities and venues; among those known to have been considered to stage the contest were the Berwald Hall in Stockholm and the Tipshallen in Jönköping. The stadium's maximum capacity of 14,000 people was reduced to 8,000 attendees for the contest, in order to provide space for the stage and technical equipment; this still made it the largest venue and the largest assembled audience in the history of the contest up to that point. During the week leading up to the rehearsals and the televised event, the European Broadcasting Union (EBU) and SVT held an official reception for the participating delegations, which was hosted on the evening of 1 May 1985 at Kronhuset.

== Participants ==
Eurovision Song Contest 1985 – Participation summaries by country
- Austria; Belgium; Cyprus; Denmark; Finland; France; Germany; Greece; Ireland; Israel; Italy; Luxembourg; Norway; Portugal; Spain; Sweden; Switzerland; Turkey; United Kingdom

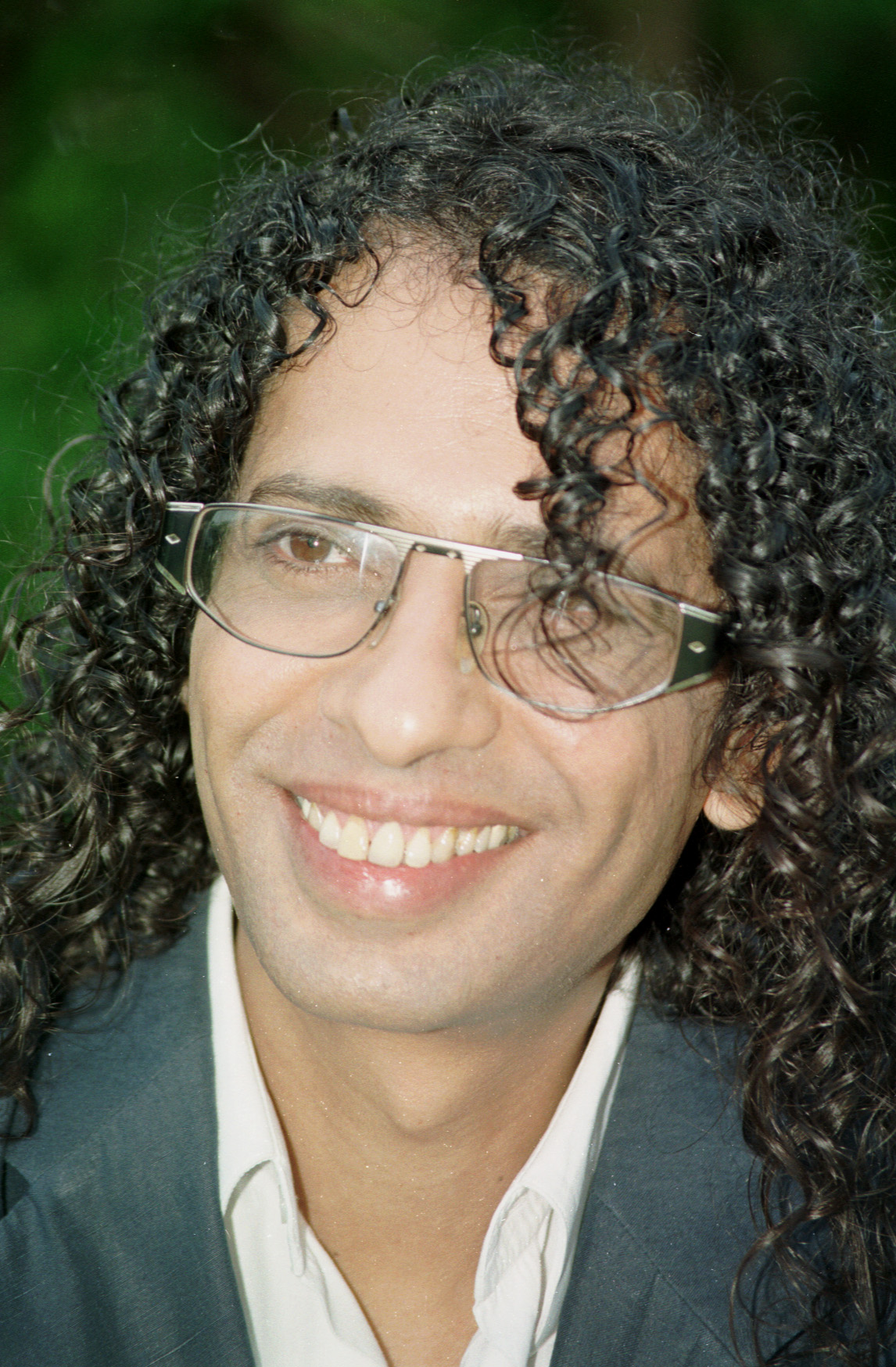
1978 contest winner Izhar Cohen represented Israel for a second time.

Nineteen countries in total participated in the 1985 contest. Greece and Israel both returned following a one-year absence, however the Netherlands and Yugoslavia, which had competed in the previous year's contest, declined to enter in 1985 as the date of the contest coincided with memorial days in the countries, specifically the Remembrance of the Dead, and the anniversary of the death of Yugoslav president Josip Broz Tito, respectively. It was the first time in the contest's history that there was no entry from the Netherlands, with the nation having previously competed in every event since its creation in 1956.

Several of the participating artists in this year's event had previously competed in past editions of the contest. Izhar Cohen, who had previously won the contest for Israel in 1978 with the song "A-Ba-Ni-Bi" alongside the group Alphabeta, made a second appearance for his country at this event. The Danish group Hot Eyes had represented Denmark in 1984, while the Italian duo Al Bano and Romina Power also made a second appearance, having previously competed for Italy in 1976. The two members of group Bobbysocks representing Norway, had competed in the event separately, with Hanne Krogh having represented Norway in 1971, and Elisabeth Andreasson previously competing for Sweden in 1982 as a member of the group Chips alongside Kikki Danielsson; Danielsson also competed in this event as a solo artist for Sweden. The Swiss duo Mariella Farré and Pino Gasparini had also previously competed in the contest for their country with separate entries, with Farré having competed in 1983 as a soloist, while Gasparini had been a member of the Pepe Lienhard Band in 1977. Gary Lux representing Austria as a solo artist, had represented the country in 1983 as a member of the group Westend; and Ireen Sheer, who had already twice competed in Eurovision, for Luxembourg in 1974 and for Germany in 1978, represented Luxembourg again at this contest alongside five other artists. Additionally, Lia Vissi representing Cyprus, had previously participated as backing vocalist at the contest on two separate occasions for Greece in 1979 and 1980, the latter as a member of the group the Epikouri; and Rhonda Heath, who was a member of the group Silver Convention that had represented Germany in 1977, returned as a backing vocalist for Austria at this event.

Eurovision Song Contest 1985 participants
Country	Broadcaster	Artist	Song	Language	Songwriter(s)	Conductor
Austria	ORF	Gary Lux	"Kinder dieser Welt"	German	Geoff Bastow; Mick Jackson; Michael Kunze	Richard Oesterreicher
Belgium	BRT	Linda Lepomme	"Laat me nu gaan"	Dutch	Pieter Verlinden; Bert Vivier	Curt-Eric Holmquist
Cyprus	CyBC	Lia Vissi	"To katalava arga" (Το κατάλαβα αργά)	Greek	Lia Vissi	Haris Andreadis
Denmark	DR	Hot Eyes	"Sku' du spørg' fra no'en"	Danish	Søren Bundgaard; Keld Heick	Wolfgang Käfer
Finland	YLE	Sonja Lumme	"Eläköön elämä"	Finnish	Petri Laaksonen; Veli-Pekka Lehto	Ossi Runne
France	Antenne 2	Roger Bens	"Femme dans ses rêves aussi"	French	Didier Pascalis	Michel Bernholc
Germany	BR (Note: On behalf of the German public broadcasting consortium ARD)	Wind	"Für alle"	German	Hanne Haller	Rainer Pietsch
Greece	ERT	Takis Biniaris	"Miazoume" (Μοιάζουμε)	Greek	Takis Biniaris; Maro Bizani	Haris Andreadis
Ireland	RTÉ	Maria Christian	"Wait Until the Weekend Comes"	English	Brendan Graham	Noel Kelehan
Israel	IBA	Izhar Cohen	"Olé, Olé" (עולה, עולה)	Hebrew	Hamutal Ben Ze'ev; Kobi Oshrat	Kobi Oshrat
Italy	RAI	Al Bano and Romina Power	"Magic, Oh Magic"	Italian	Dario Farina; Michael Hofmann; Cristiano Minellono	Fiorenzo Zanotti
Luxembourg	CLT	Margo, Franck Olivier, Chris Roberts, Malcolm Roberts, Ireen Sheer and Diane Solomon	"Children, Kinder, Enfants"	French	Jean-Michel Bériat; Bernd Meinunger; Ralph Siegel	Norbert Daum
Norway	NRK	Bobbysocks	"La det swinge"	Norwegian	Rolf Løvland	Terje Fjærn
Portugal	RTP	Adelaide	"Penso em ti, eu sei"	Portuguese	Tozé Brito; Luís Fernando; Adelaide Ferreira	José Calvário
Spain	TVE	Paloma San Basilio	"La fiesta terminó"	Spanish	Juan Carlos Calderón	Juan Carlos Calderón
Sweden	SVT	Kikki Danielsson	"Bra vibrationer"	Swedish	Ingela Forsman; Lasse Holm	Curt-Eric Holmquist
Switzerland	SRG SSR	Mariella Farré and Pino Gasparini	"Piano, piano"	German	Anita Kerr; Trudi Müller-Bosshard	Anita Kerr
Turkey	TRT	MFÖ	"Didai didai dai"	Turkish	Mazhar Alanson; Fuat Güner; Özkan Uğur	Garo Mafyan
United Kingdom	BBC	Vikki	"Love Is"	English	James Kaleth; Vikki Watson	John Coleman

== Production and format ==
The Eurovision Song Contest 1985 was produced by SVT. Steen Priwin served as executive producer and director, Ingemar Wiberg served as designer, and Curt-Eric Holmquist served as musical director, leading the orchestra. A separate musical director could be nominated by each participating delegation to lead the orchestra during its country's performance, with the host musical director also available to conduct for those countries which did not nominate their own conductor. On behalf of the contest organisers, the EBU, the event was overseen by Frank Naef as scrutineer.

Each participating broadcaster submitted one song, which was required to be no longer than three minutes in duration and performed in the language, or one of the languages, of the country which it represented. A maximum of six performers were allowed on stage during each country's performance. Each entry could utilise all or part of the live orchestra and could use instrumental-only backing tracks, however any backing tracks used could only include the sound of instruments featured on stage being mimed by the performers.

The results of the 1985 contest were determined through the same scoring system as had first been introduced in 1975: each country awarded twelve points to its favourite entry, followed by ten points to its second favourite, and then awarded points in decreasing value from eight to one for the remaining songs which featured in the country's top ten, with countries unable to vote for their own entry. The points awarded by each country were determined by an assembled jury of eleven individuals, who were all required to be members of the public with no connection to the music industry, with a recommendation that there should be a balance between the sexes and that half should be under 25 years old. Each jury member voted in secret and awarded between one and five votes to each participating song, excluding that from their own country and with no abstentions permitted. The votes of each member were collected following the country's performance and then tallied by the non-voting jury chairperson to determine the points to be awarded. In any cases where two or more songs in the top ten received the same number of votes, a show of hands by all jury members was used to determine the final placing.

Rehearsals for the participating artists began on 28 April 1985. Two technical rehearsals were conducted for each participating delegation in the week approaching the contest, with countries rehearsing in the order in which they would perform. The first rehearsals of 40 minutes were held on 29 and 30 April, followed by a press conference for each delegation and the accredited press. Each country's second rehearsals were held on 1 and 2 May and lasted 25 minutes total. Three dress rehearsals were held with all artists, two held in the afternoon and evening of 3 May and one final rehearsal in the afternoon of 4 May, with an invited audience present for the second dress rehearsal.

== Contest overview ==
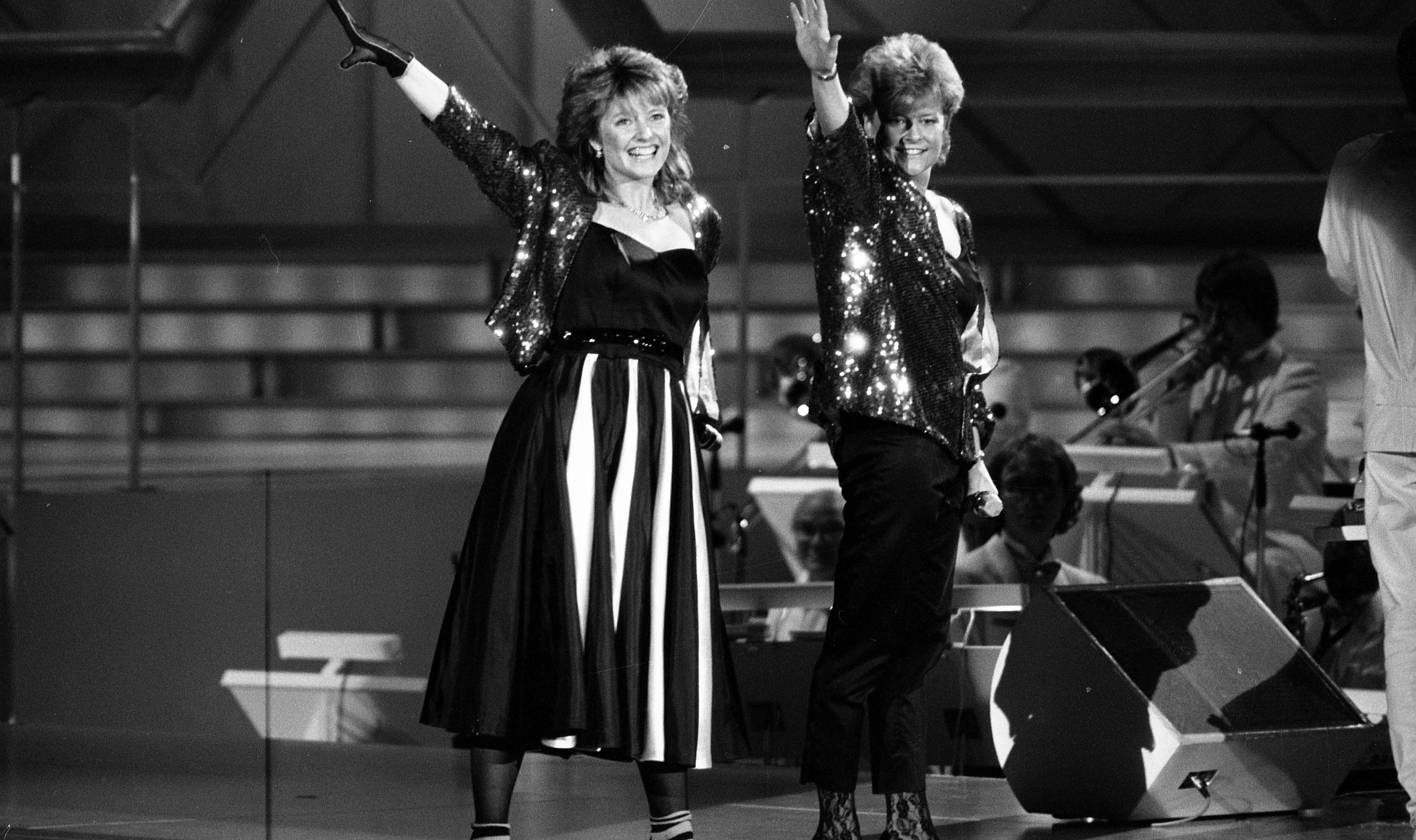
Hanne Krogh (left) and Elisabeth Andreasson, the members of Bobbysocks, during their Eurovision performance

The contest was held on 4 May 1985, beginning at 21:00 (CEST) and lasting 2 hours and 46 minutes. The event was presented by Swedish singer Lill Lindfors; Lindfors had represented Sweden in 1966 alongside Svante Thuresson, placing second with the song "Nygammal vals". Following the confirmation of the nineteen participating countries, a draw was held in Gothenburg on 7 December 1984 to determine the running order (R/O) of the contest.

Lindfors opened the contest with a performance of "My Joy Is Building Bricks of Music", an English version of her song "Musik ska byggas utav glädje", becoming the first contest presenter to perform during the contest. To mark the thirtieth staging of the contest, among the invited audience present was Lys Assia, the contest's first winning artist and representative for Switzerland in three consecutive contests, in 1956, 1957 and 1958. The interval act featured jazz guitarists Peter Almqvist and Ulf Wakenius, performing as Guitars Unlimited. Lindfors was also part of a memorable moment from the contest: when she returned to the stage following the interval act, the skirt of her outfit, designed by Christer Lindarw, got caught on the set and ripped off in an apparent wardrobe malfunction, before Lindfors unclipped the top portion of her outfit to reveal a dress; returning to the microphone, she remarked to the audience, "I just wanted you to wake up a little." The trophy awarded to the winning songwriter was presented by the previous year's winning artists Herreys.

The winner was Norway represented by the song "La det swinge", composed and written by Rolf Løvland, and performed by Hanne Krogh and Elisabeth Andreasson as Bobbysocks. It was Norway's first contest win and marked a notable turnaround in fortune for the country, which had only placed in the top five on two previous occasions while having placed last six times, including three nul points, at the time of the event, a fact on which Lindfors commented as she interviewed Bobbysocks on stage following their victory. During the traditional winner's reprise performance, the group sung part of the winning song as its English version "Let It Swing", with the English lyrics also written by Løvland.

Results of the Eurovision Song Contest 1985
R/O	Country	Artist	Song	Points	Place
1	Ireland	Maria Christian	"Wait Until the Weekend Comes"	91	6
2	Finland	Sonja Lumme	"Eläköön elämä"	58	9
3	Cyprus	Lia Vissi	"To katalava arga"	15	16
4	Denmark	Hot Eyes	"Sku' du spørg' fra no'en"	41	11
5	Spain	Paloma San Basilio	"La fiesta terminó"	36	14
6	France	Roger Bens	"Femme dans ses rêves aussi"	56	10
7	Turkey	MFÖ	"Didai didai dai"	36	14
8	Belgium	Linda Lepomme	"Laat me nu gaan"	7	19
9	Portugal	Adelaide	"Penso em ti, eu sei"	9	18
10	Germany	Wind	"Für alle"	105	2
11	Israel	Izhar Cohen	"Olé, Olé"	93	5
12	Italy	Al Bano and Romina Power	"Magic, Oh Magic"	78	7
13	Norway	Bobbysocks	"La det swinge"	123	1
14	United Kingdom	Vikki	"Love Is"	100	4
15	Switzerland	Mariella Farré and Pino Gasparini	"Piano, piano"	39	12
16	Sweden	Kikki Danielsson	"Bra vibrationer"	103	3
17	Austria	Gary Lux	"Kinder dieser Welt"	60	8
18	Luxembourg	Margo, Franck Olivier, Chris Roberts, Malcolm Roberts, Ireen Sheer and Diane Solomon	"Children, Kinder, Enfants"	37	13
19	Greece	Takis Biniaris	"Miazoume"	15	16

=== Spokespersons ===
Each participating broadcaster appointed a spokesperson, connected to the contest venue via telephone lines and responsible for announcing, in English or French, the votes for its respective country. Known spokespersons at the 1985 contest are listed below.

- Finland – Annemi Genetz
- Sweden – Agneta Bolme Börjefors
- United Kingdom – Colin Berry

== Detailed voting results ==
Jury voting was used to determine the points awarded by all countries. The announcement of the results from each country was conducted in the order in which they performed, with the spokespersons announcing their country's points in English or French in ascending order. The detailed breakdown of the points awarded by each country is listed in the tables below.

Norway's victory at this contest was achieved with the lowest winning score awarded under the voting system used between 1975 and 2015. Although the Norwegian entry received the maximum score from eight of the voting countries, almost half of those eligible, the Norwegian entry also received only 27 points from the remaining ten countries which could vote for Norway.

Detailed voting results of the Eurovision Song Contest 1985
		Total score	Ireland	Finland	Cyprus	Denmark	Spain	France	Turkey	Belgium	Portugal	Germany	Israel	Italy	Norway	United Kingdom	Switzerland	Sweden	Austria	Luxembourg	Greece
Contestants	Ireland	91		1	7	3	4	3	5	8	8	4	8	**12**	3	3	5	7	10		
Contestants	Finland	58	6		6		6		3				1	7		7	2	10			10
Contestants	Cyprus	15	1											3			3				8
Contestants	Denmark	41			3			10		3	1	6		2	6			5	5		
Contestants	Spain	36	2	8	1				**12**		2					4				1	6
Contestants	France	56		5	4				1		3		3	10		2	4	6	3	3	**12**
Contestants	Turkey	36	7	2			3			1		2			1	8	**12**				
Contestants	Belgium	7							7												
Contestants	Portugal	9							2												7
Contestants	Germany	105	4	10	**12**	10	10	8		10	7		7		8	1		8		10	
Contestants	Israel	93	8		5	4	8	**12**			5	7		5	10	5	7	2	7	6	2
Contestants	Italy	78		6	10	1	**12**	5	8	2	**12**		4						6	**12**	
Contestants	Norway	**123**	**12**	4		**12**	1	2		**12**		**12**	**12**	6		**12**	6	**12**	**12**	7	1
Contestants	United Kingdom	100	5	7		5	5	6	10	6	6	5	2	8	7		10	4	2	8	4
Contestants	Switzerland	39		3	2	6			6	5	4	1			5			1	1	2	3
Contestants	Sweden	103	10	**12**		8	2	7	4	7		8	6	4	**12**	6	8		4	5	
Contestants	Austria	60	3			7		1		4		10	10		2	10	1	3		4	5
Contestants	Luxembourg	37				2		4			10	3	5	1	4				8		
Contestants	Greece	15			8		7														

=== 12 points ===
The below table summarises how the maximum 12 points were awarded from one country to another. The winning country is shown in bold. Norway received the maximum score of 12 points from eight of the voting countries, with Italy receiving three sets of 12 points, Sweden receiving two sets, and France, Germany, Ireland, Israel, Spain and Turkey each receiving one maximum score.

Distribution of 12 points awarded at the Eurovision Song Contest 1985
N.	Contestant	Nation(s) giving 12 points
8	**Norway**	Austria, Belgium, Denmark, Germany, Ireland, Israel, Sweden, United Kingdom
3	Italy	Luxembourg, Portugal, Spain
2	Sweden	Finland, Norway
1	France	Greece
1	Germany	Cyprus
1	Ireland	Italy
1	Israel	France
1	Spain	Turkey
1	Turkey	Switzerland

== Broadcasts ==
Each participating broadcaster was required to relay the contest via its networks. Non-participating member broadcasters were also able to relay the contest as "passive participants". Broadcasters were able to send commentators to provide coverage of the contest in their own native language and to relay information about the artists and songs to their television viewers. These commentators were typically sent to the venue to report on the event, and were able to provide commentary from small booths constructed at the back of the venue. The contest was reportedly broadcast in 30 countries, including the participating nations, Australia, and in the countries of South America, with an estimated global audience of 400 to 600 million. Known details on the broadcasts in each country, including the specific broadcasting stations and commentators are shown in the tables below.

Broadcasters and commentators in participating countries
Country	Broadcaster	Channel(s)	Commentator(s)	Ref.
Austria	ORF	FS1	Ernst Grissemann	
Belgium	BRT	TV1	Luc Appermont	
Belgium	BRT	BRT 2, Studio Brussel		
Belgium	RTBF	RTBF1	Jacques Mercier	
Cyprus	CyBC	RIK, A Programma	Themis Themistokleous	
Denmark	DR	DR TV	Jørgen de Mylius	
Finland	YLE	TV1, Rinnakkaisohjelma	Kari Lumikero	
France	Antenne 2		Patrice Laffont	
France	RFO	Second canal de RFO (Note: Delayed broadcast in Martinique on 5 June 1985 at 20:26 (AST))		
Germany	ARD	Erstes Deutsches Fernsehen	Ado Schlier	
Greece	ERT	ERT		
Ireland	RTÉ	RTÉ 1	Linda Martin	
Ireland	RTÉ	RTÉ Radio 1	Larry Gogan	
Israel	IBA	Israeli Television, Reshet Gimel		
Italy	RAI	Rai Due (Note: Deferred broadcast at 22:30 (CEST))	Rosanna Vaudetti	
Italy	RAI	RaiStereoUno		
Luxembourg	CLT	RTL Télévision	Valérie Sarn	
Luxembourg	CLT	RTL plus	Oliver Spiecker	
Norway	NRK	NRK Fjernsynet	Veslemøy Kjendsli	
Norway	NRK	NRK P1, (Note: Deferred broadcast at 22:55 (CEST)) NRK P2	Jahn Teigen and Erik Heyerdahl	
Portugal	RTP	RTP1	Eládio Clímaco	
Spain	TVE	TVE 2	Antonio Gómez Mateo	
Sweden	SVT	TV1	Fredrik Belfrage	
Sweden	RR	SR P3	Jan Ellerås and Rune Hallberg	
Switzerland	SRG SSR	TV DRS	Bernard Thurnheer	
Switzerland	SRG SSR	TSR	Serge Moisson	
Switzerland	SRG SSR	TSI		
Turkey	TRT	TRT Televizyon	Başak Doğru	
United Kingdom	BBC	BBC1	Terry Wogan	
United Kingdom	BFBS	BFBS Radio	Richard Nankivell	

Broadcasters and commentators in non-participating countries
Country	Broadcaster	Channel(s)	Commentator(s)	Ref.
Australia	SBS	SBS TV (Note: Deferred broadcast the following day at 19:30 (AEST))		
Czechoslovakia	ČST	II. program (Note: Delayed broadcast in a shortened format on 1 June 1985 at 11:05 (CEST))		
Faroe Islands	SvF (Note: Delayed broadcast on 11 May 1985 at 21:30 (WEST))		Jørgen de Mylius	
Greenland	KNR	KNR (Note: Delayed broadcast on 18 May 1985 at 21:45 (WGST))		
Iceland	RÚV	Sjónvarpið	Hinrik Bjarnason	
Malaysia	TV3 (Note: Delayed broadcast on 1 June 1985 at 20:30 (MST))			
Netherlands	Olympus (Note: Deferred broadcast the following day at 10:00 (CEST))		Gerrit den Braber	
Poland	TP	TP1 (Note: Delayed broadcast on 25 May 1985 at 20:00 (CEST))		
Romania	TVR	Programul 1 (Note: Delayed broadcast in a shortened format on 25 May 1985 at 19:50 (EEST))		
South Korea	KBS	1TV (Note: Delayed broadcast on 20 May 1985 at 19:00 (KST))		

== Notes and references ==
=== Bibliography ===
- Murtomäki, Asko (2007). Finland 12 points! Suomen Euroviisut (in Finnish). Helsinki, Finland: Teos. ISBN 951-851-106-3.
- O'Connor, John Kennedy (2010). The Eurovision Song Contest: The Official History (2nd ed.). London, United Kingdom: Carlton Books. ISBN 978-1-84732-521-1.
- Roxburgh, Gordon (2014). Songs for Europe: The United Kingdom at the Eurovision Song Contest. Vol. Two: The 1970s. Prestatyn, United Kingdom: Telos Publishing. ISBN 978-1-84583-093-9.
- Roxburgh, Gordon (2016). Songs for Europe: The United Kingdom at the Eurovision Song Contest. Vol. Three: The 1980s. Prestatyn, United Kingdom: Telos Publishing. ISBN 978-1-84583-163-9.
- Thorsson, Leif; Verhage, Martin (2006). Melodifestivalen genom tiderna : de svenska uttagningarna och internationella finalerna [Melodifestivalen through the ages: the Swedish selections and international finals] (in Swedish). Stockholm, Sweden: Premium Publishing. ISBN 91-89136-29-2.
