= Africans in Turkey =

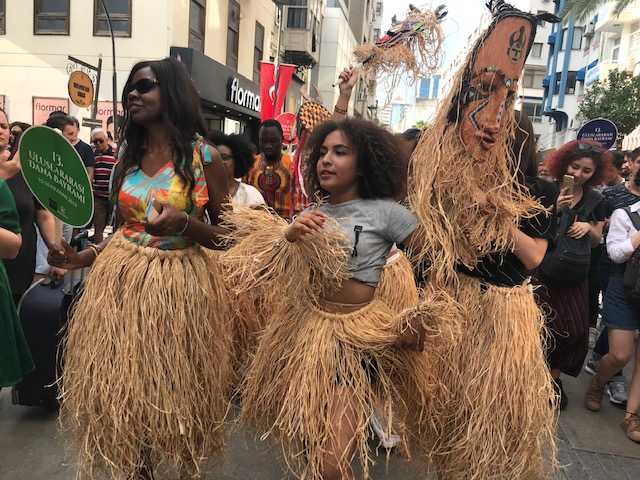
People with African heritage celebrating the Calf Festival (Turkish: Dana Bayramı) in İzmir.

Africans in Turkey (Turkish: Türkiye'deki Afrikalılar) are people of Sub-Saharan African descent who are citizens or residents of Turkey. They are immigrant and refugee communities mostly from western, central and eastern Africa. African immigrants are distinct to Afro-Turks, which number around 20,000. As of 2017, there are 1.5 million Africans living across Turkey, with one in four residing in Istanbul.

== History ==
=== Modern era ===
Since the end of 1990s the number of people with roots from Africa has grown considerably in Turkey due to immigration. The modern immigrant community is composed mostly of immigrants and refugees from Ghana, Ethiopia, DRC, Sudan, Nigeria, Kenya, Eritrea, Somalia and Senegal. Most of the African immigrants in Turkey come to Turkey to further migrate to Europe, but due to the tightening of immigration policy of both Turkey and EU most of the immigrants now migrate to Turkey to stay. Immigrants from Eastern Africa are usually refugees, meanwhile Western and Central African immigration is reported to be economically driven. The migration pattern of the latter group is being described as a middle class movement of white collar workers and urban traders who want to improve their economical conditions.

According to state-owned Anadolu Agency, government data suggests that there are 1.5 million Africans living all across Turkey as of 2017, with 25% of them in Istanbul. Other studies state the majority of Africans in Turkey lives in Istanbul and report Tarlabaşı, Dolapdere, Kumkapı, Yenikapı and Kurtuluş as having a strong African presence. Estimates of the number of Africans living in Istanbul varies between 50,000 and 200,000. Ankara also has a sizeable Somali community.

== Culture ==
It is asserted that West African and Turkish cultural spaces are usually segregated from each other and African clubs and restaurants throughout the city are mainly visited by the community’s own members. Mecidiyeköy, where many Africans live hosts night clubs that play Afrobeat artists such as Wizkid, Zlatan and Burna B. The hairdressers are also reportedly to be mostly servicing African customers.

=== Religion ===
An Ugandan pastor living in Istanbul since 2013 has stated that underground house churches function both as a place of worship and a rehabilitation center for the African Christian community. The pastor asserted that the church he has been pastoring to was attacked many times within 2 years and expressed concern for the future of the establishment. Muslim African migrants such as those from Senegal usually gather on Thursday nights to read prayers, listen to each other’s problems and try to support one another. The vast majority of Afro-Turks are Muslim.

=== Calf Festival ===
In İzmir Calf Festival (Turkish: Dana Bayramı) has been annually observed to celebrate African heritage since 2007. The celebration, in which originally a decorated calf was paraded around, collecting donations and well wishes for spring was originated from the late 19th century culture of the African slave community in the Ottoman Empire, but later banned in early 20th century due to the Atatürk's secularist reforms against non-state-controlled religious institutions and superstitious practices such as Calf Festival with its trace remnants of African tribal practices. This led to the extinction of celebrations in the 1960s, but in 2007 Dana Bayramı was revitalized as an international celebration by the founder of Afro-Turk Foundation Mustafa Olpak and presently observed by Afro-Turks, other people of African descent such as recent migrants and non-African İzmir locals. Older Afro-Turks are reported to be not interested in Calf Festival celebrations.

Modern celebrations were described as a form of entertainment rather than being an attempt to accurately replicate a largely forgotten tradition. Contemporary Calf Festival incorporates elements from all around the continent such as the use of traditional African masks and the dance performances of Burundian and Malian students and is not being confined to the culture of Afro-Turks or Zanj people.

== Economy ==
Many migrants rely on other Africans to help them find jobs in the informal economy. The New Humanitarian reported that Senegalese street vendors are known for selling sunglasses and wallets; Nigerians engage in textiles and trade; while Cameroonians sell clothes. Others are stated to be turning to minor criminality and prostitution. Because Turkey's aid resources are mostly spent on Syrian refugees, few humanitarian agencies are working with African migrants.

== Discrimination ==
A common opinion held by the Turkish society is that racism against black people in Turkey is not a big issue because they believe that the country does not have a history of colonialism or segregation as in many European-majority countries. On the contrary, sociologists such as Doğuş Şimşek strongly reject this point of view, stressing that this misperception resulted from the fact that Africans in Turkey often live in the shadows and Afro-Turks, the historical black population of Turkey, are mostly confined to tiny communities in Western Turkey.

It is reported that African immigrants in Turkey regularly face economic and social challenges, notably racism and opposition to immigration by locals. African immigrant women in Turkey stated that sexual abuse, especially by their employers is prevalent. An Ugandan woman reported that she and other African women are regularly being harassed on the streets since most of the people think that they are sex workers. Şimşek stated the experiences of African migrants are not well known in Turkey as it is not a debated issue in the society.

Didier Drogba and Emmanuel Eboué, both of whom originate from the Ivory Coast and played association football for the Galatasaray, were subjected to racial insults from fans during a match against Fenerbahçe in 2013. The players were compared to monkeys and reportedly had a banana pointed at them.

== Notable Turks of African descent ==
- Adem Bona
- Ahmet Ali Çelikten
- Fercani Şener
- Uche Okechukwu
- Preston Shumpert
- Esmeray
- Vahap Ozaltay
- Mansur Ark
- Richard Kingson
- Ibrahim Yattara
- Defne Joy Foster
- Colin Kazim-Richards
- Kuzgun Acar
- Tuğçe Güder
- Mehmet Aurélio
- Pascal Nouma
- Elvan Abeylegesse
- Black Musa
- Melissa Vargas
- Emre Zafer Barnes
- Yasmani Copello
- Jak Ali Harvey
- Yasemin Can
- İlham Tanui Özbilen
- Kaan Kigen Özbilen
- Meryem Akda
- Tarık Langat Akdağ
- Alemitu Bekele Degfa
- Polat Kemboi Arıkan
