= Black African diaspora in Europe =

European citizens and residents born in or with ancestors from Sub-Saharan Africa

Black Europeans
Total population
- ~8,000,000–9,000,000 (2019 est.; 1.07–1.21% of the total population of Europe) (Note: Europe's total population was 746,189,645 in 2019.)

Religion
- Christianity, Islam

Related ethnic groups
- African diaspora

Black Europeans of African ancestry, or Afro-Europeans, refers to people in Europe who trace full or partial ancestry to Sub-Saharan Africa.

== European Union ==
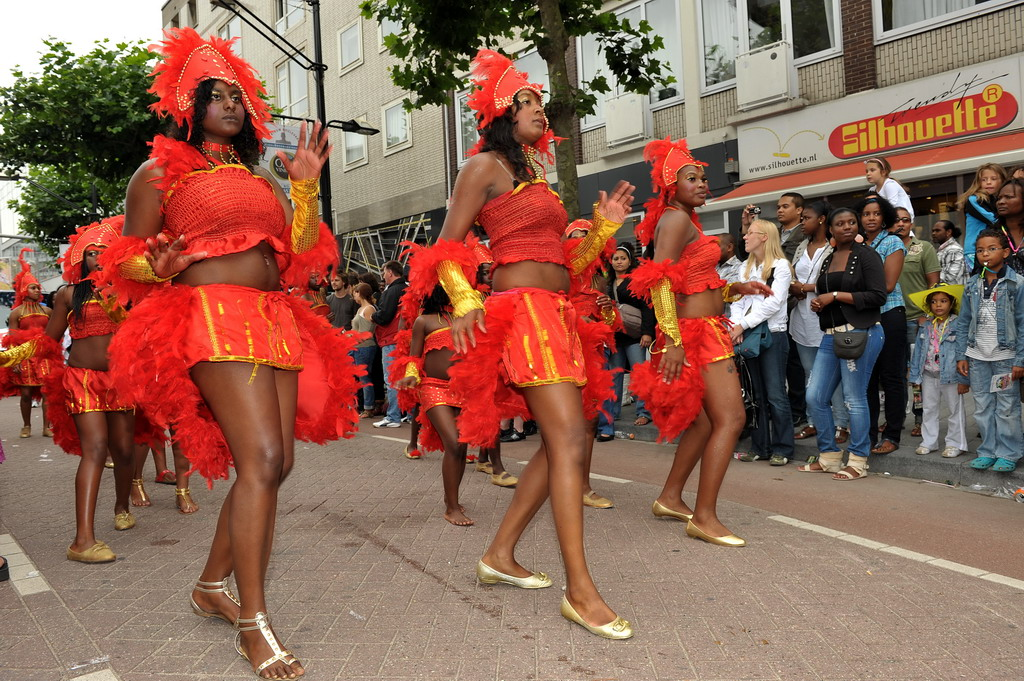
Summer Carnival in Rotterdam

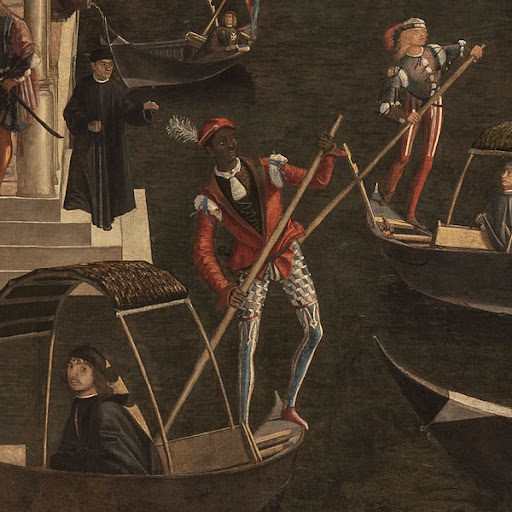
Detail of a Black Italian gondolier from Miracle of the Relic of the Cross at the Ponte di Rialto by Vittore Carpaccio, c. 1496

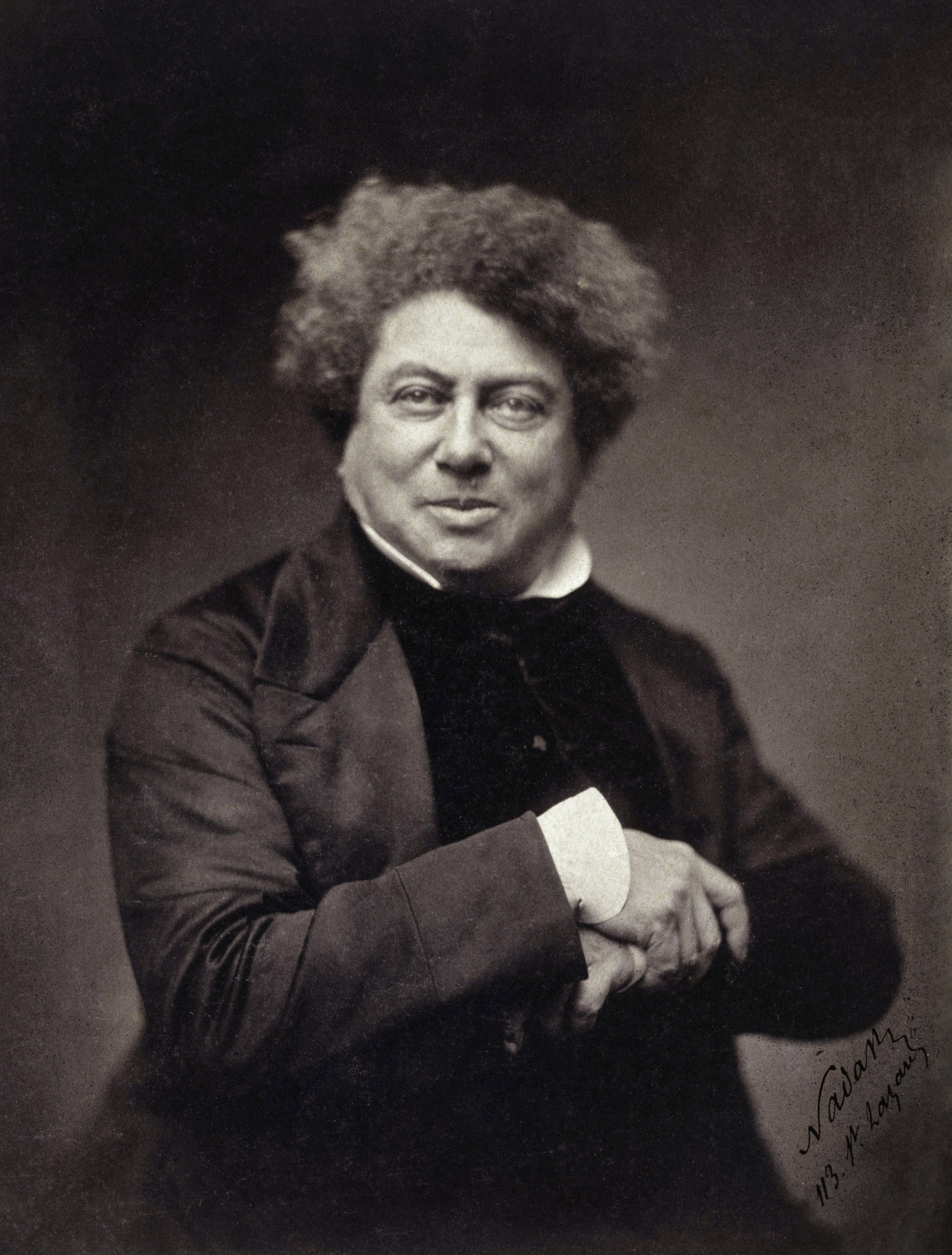
Alexandre Dumas, one of the most important French novelists of the 19th century (The Count of Monte Cristo, The Three Musketeers...).

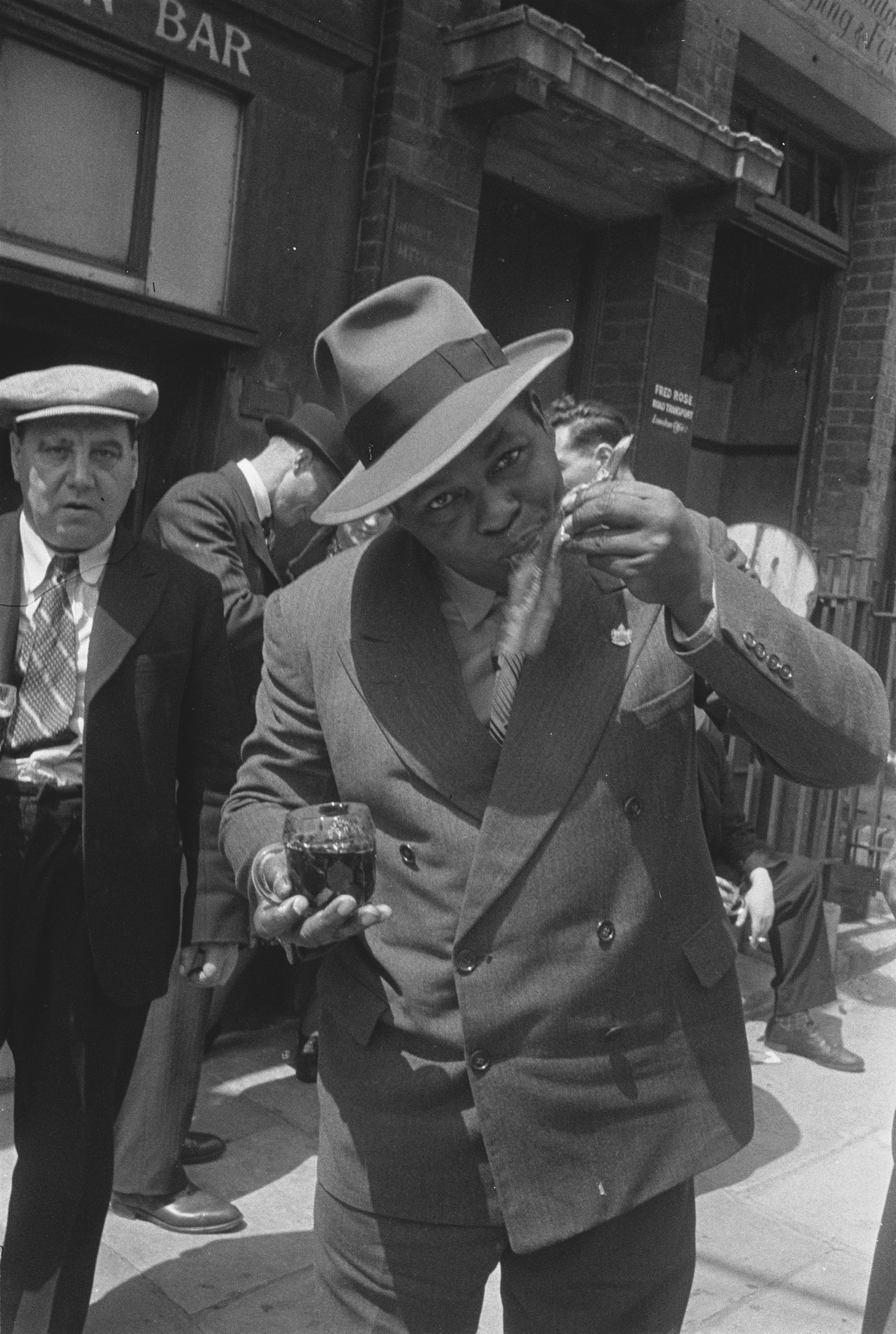
A Black Dutch merchant seaman eating maatjesharing in London, June 1943

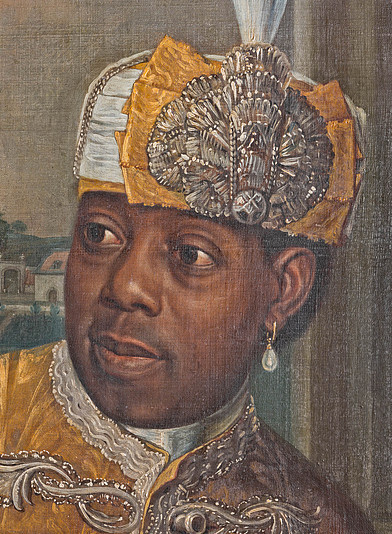
Portrait of Ignatius Fortuna

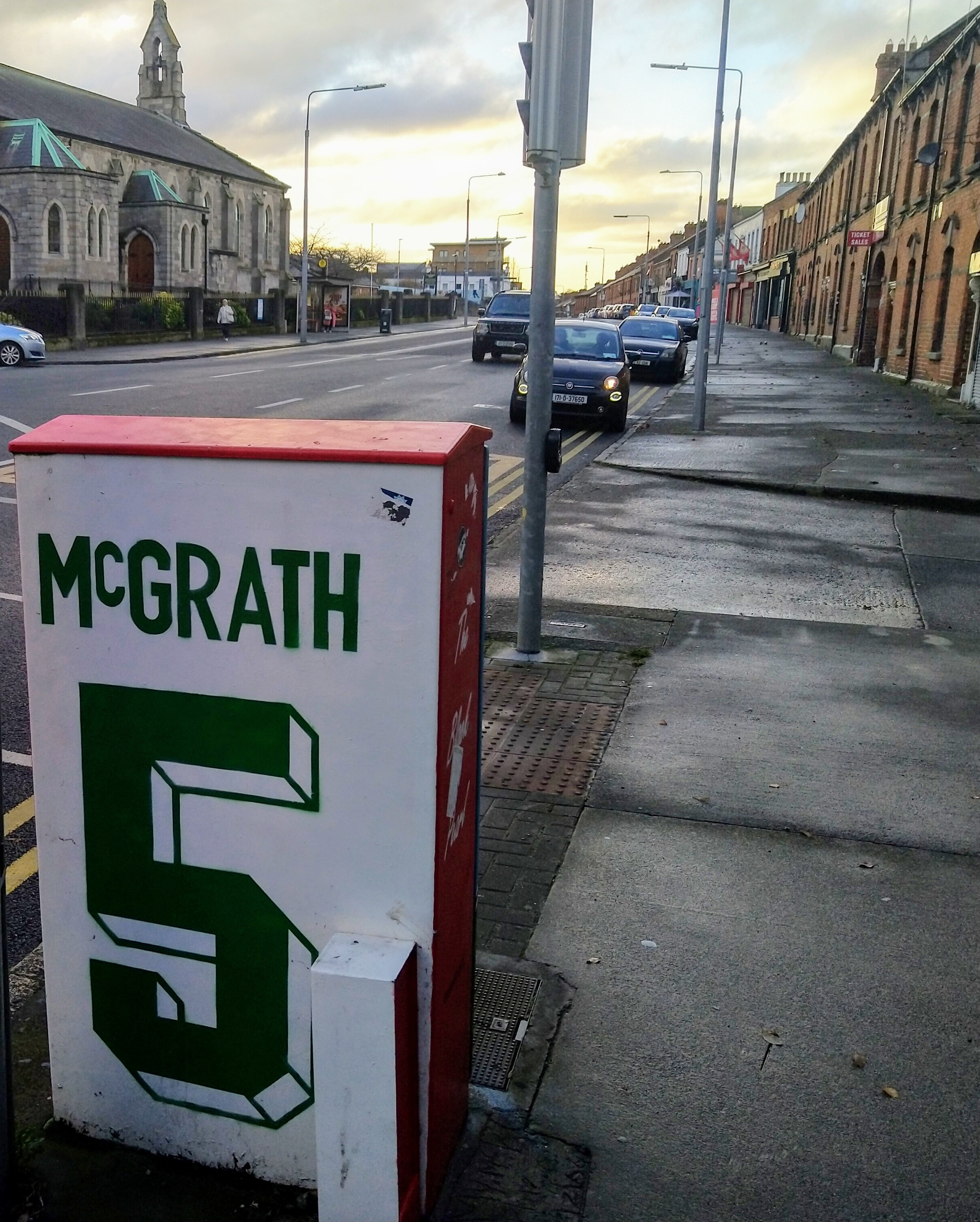
Street art dedicated to Irish footballer Paul McGrath outside Richmond Park, home ground of his first club St Patrick's Athletic.

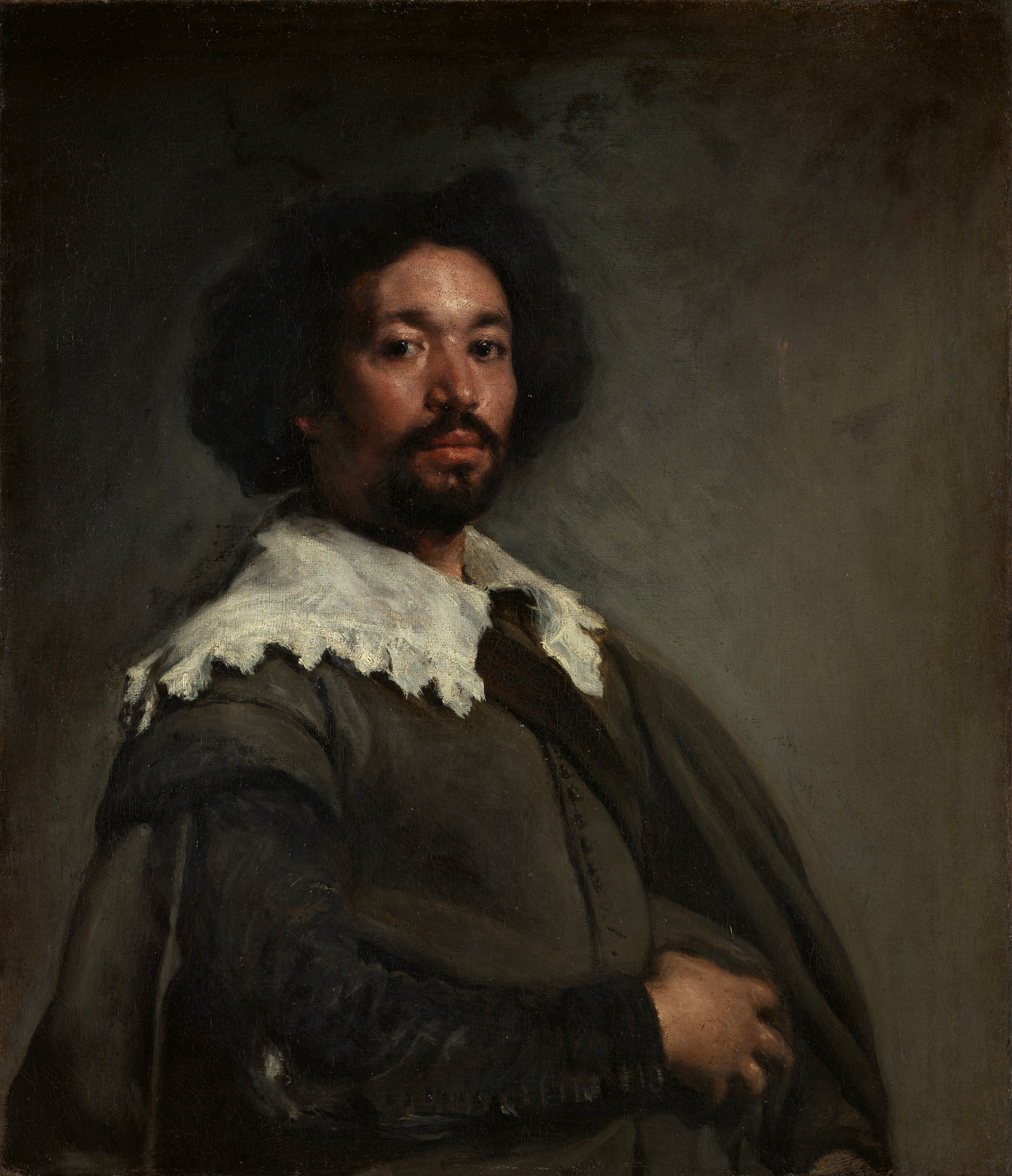
Portrait of Juan de Pareja (1650) by Diego Velázquez, depicting the Afro-Spanish painter Juan de Pareja.

In the European Union (EU) as of 2019, there is a record of approximately 9.6 million people of Sub-Saharan African or Afro-Caribbean descent, comprising around 2% of the total population, with over 50% located in France. The countries with the largest African population in the EU are:

| Country | Population | % of country's population (Note: Countries' total populations: Austria: 8.9 million in 2020 according to UN DESA. Belgium: 11.4 million in 2019 according to the World Bank. Denmark: 5.8 million in 2019. Finland: 5,603,851 in 2023. France: 64.4 million in 2009 according to the World Bank. Germany: 83 million in 2020 according to UN DESA. Ireland: 4.76 million people according to the April 2016 census. Italy: 60.3 million in 2020 according to UN DESA. Luxembourg: 613,894 in 2019. Netherlands: 17.5 million in 2021 according to the World Bank. Portugal: 10,247,605 in 2023 according to Worldometer. Spain: 47.3 million in 2020 according to UN DESA. Sweden: 10.4 million in 2020 according to UN DESA.) | Year | Comments / source |
|---|---|---|---|---|
| Austria | 40,000 | 0.5% | 2020 | Estimate making use of current Sub-Saharan born population (68,843), Caribbean born (21,730) for total foreign born black population (90,573) and approximate progeny born and their descendants based on historical migration and birth statistics. A multiple of 1.4x is used as migration has shorter time background. See here for access to country of birth data. This is a precise estimate. |
| Belgium | 410,000 | 3.6% | 2019 | Estimate making use of current sub-Saharan born population (240,069) and approximate progeny born and their descendants based on historical migration and birth statistics. Most have roots in the former Belgian colonies of the Congo, Rwanda, and Burundi as well as other French-speaking African countries. This is an estimate, likely a slight overestimate (error: ± 25,000). |
| Denmark | 52,795 | 0.9% | 2019 | Sub-Saharan Africans and their descendants, alongside any by racial or mixed race of African heritage are counted. Irregular migrants are counted in this due to the use of the Schengen Information System markers - as overstays are counted as "present" in one given country - and thus the European estimate evens out). This is a precise census number. |
| Finland | At least 58,052 | 1.0% | 2023 | I.e., according to Statistics Finland, people in Finland: • whose both parents are Sub-Saharan African-born (SSA; i.e., all other African countries but Algeria, Egypt, Libya, Morocco, Sudan and Tunisia), • or whose only known parent was born in SSA, • or who were born in SSA and whose parents' countries of birth are unknown. Thus, for example, people with one Finnish parent and one SSA parent or people with more distant SSA ancestry are not included in this country-based non-ethnic figure. Because the figure is country-based, it may include some Sub-Saharan white Africans. Also, SSA-born adoptees' backgrounds are determined by their adoptive parents, not by their biological parents. They are mainly from Somalia, Nigeria, DR Congo, Ethiopia, and Ghana. This is a census number. |
| France | 3,000,000–5,000,000 | 4.7–7.8% | 2009 | |
| Germany | Over 1,000,000 | >1.1% | 2020 | The German census does not use race as a category. The number of persons "having an extended migrant background" (mit Migrationshintergrund im weiteren Sinn, meaning having at least one grandparent born outside Germany), is given as 529,000. The Initiative Schwarzer Deutscher ("Black German Initiative") estimates the total of Black Germans to be about 1,000,000 persons. |
| Ireland | 64,639 | 1.4% | 2016 | Sub-Saharan Africans and their descendants, alongside any by racial or mixed race of African heritage are counted. 2016 Census is used. This is a precise census number. |
| Italy | 463,425 | 0.8% | 2020 | |
| Luxembourg | 30,000 | 4.9% | 2019 | Estimate making use of current Sub-Saharan born population (18,253) and approximate progeny born and their descendants based on historical migration and birth statistics. |
| Netherlands | 731,444 | 4.2% | 2021 | First or second generation migration background from Africa. No classification according to skin colour given. |
| Portugal | ~230,000 | 2.2% | 2023 | Extrapolated using statistics on self-identified ethnicity of Portuguese people aged 18–74 for the entire population of 10.3 million. |
| Sweden | ~200,490 | 1.9% | 2020 | Sub-Saharan Africans and their descendants, alongside any by racial or mixed race of African heritage are counted. Consists mostly of recent immigrants, refugees, and asylum seekers. Most of them are from Somalia, Eritrea and countries around. Some French and British nationals of African descent can be found in Malmö and Stockholm, as well as many African-Americans in the country playing diverse sports like Basketball that stand in the country for all life. This is a precise census number. |

The remaining (excluding Spain (Afro-Spaniards) that is not listed above) 14 states of the European Union have fewer than 100,000 individuals of Sub-Saharan African descent all together. As countries such as Poland (Black Poles), Hungary, Czech Republic, Slovakia, Romania, Bulgaria and Greece (Black Greeks) have received little to no immigration from Sub-Saharan Africa or interaction that would have caused the formation of black or mixed race communities. Black populations, inclusive of descendants, mixed race people, and temporary students, number fewer than 10,000 in each of these states.

== Other European countries ==
The United Kingdom has approximately 2.5 million black people, inclusive of mixed race, according to the 2011 Census. Black people from the EU who have settled in the UK, such as the Black Anglo-Deutsch, are also included. Switzerland and Norway have 114,000 and 115,000 people of Sub-Saharan African descent, respectively; primarily composed of refugees and their descendants, but this is only the numbers for first generation migrants and second generation migrants with two parents from a different country. There are no official numbers in Norway regarding Afro-Norwegians, as Norway does not have census regarding race or ethnicity. However, Norway collects data on migrants up to the second generation, which can be used to accurately estimate the effective Black population.

1.5 million Africans

Between the 16th and 21st centuries, Montenegro was home to a population of Black Montenegrins, particularly in the town of Ulcinj. However, starting in the 20th century, this population began to intermarry into the local Montenegrin and Albanian populations. As of 2022, there were no more fully African Montenegrins, the rest having intermarried, with the children no longer considering themselves African.

More than 1,000,000 sub-Saharan Africans had settled in Europe between 2010 and 2017.

== Racism and social status ==
Discrimination and stigmatisation of Black Europeans based on physical characteristics or visibility, regardless of nationality or immigration status, is a common experience.

Discrimination in the workplace is widespread, and barriers are constructed at every stage to prevent black individuals from obtaining jobs that match their talents and expertise. Black individuals are also more vulnerable to police violence, racial profiling, and racist violence and abuse from other members of the community. Racism against black students in schools includes racist bullying as well as biased instructional materials and practices. This has important ramifications for Black people's educational attainment and life opportunities. Other forms of discrimination include the withholding of health care to Black Europeans and prejudice displayed by health care workers; considerable discrimination in the private renting market; and stereotypical representations in the media.

There is currently no EU or national policy aimed specifically at combating racism and prejudice against Black Europeans. Despite EU and state legislation offering legal remedies for discrimination, anti-Black racism in the EU persists.

In 2020, President von der Leyen launched a new EU anti-racism Action Plan, outlining a number of initiatives for 2020–2025. The Commission will ensure that Member States fully implement relevant EU law and, where necessary, strengthen the legal framework. This could happen, particularly in areas not yet covered by anti-discrimination legislation, such as law enforcement. The Action Plan brings together players at all levels to better effectively combat racism in Europe, including the implementation of national anti-racism policies. EU member states were called upon to adopt national action plans against racism (NAPARs) by the end of 2022. As of March 2023, in Germany, Spain and Sweden, a comprehensive publicly-available National Action Plan Against Racism (NAPAR) has been adopted by the government and parliament.

According to a survey conducted by the European Union Agency for Fundamental Rights, which asked over 16,000 immigrants, including over 6,700 people born in sub-Saharan Africa, the highest rate of reported discrimination in the last years, was in German-Speaking Europe, particularly Germany with 54% reporting having experienced racist harassment, well above the EU average of 30%.

== List of subgroups ==
- Afro-Abkhazians
- Afro-Austrians
- Black Belgians
- Black British people (Cambridge, Liverpool, London)
- Afro-Dutch people
- Afro-Finns
- Black people in France (Paris)
- Afro-Germans
- Black Greeks
- Black people in Ireland
- Black Italians
- Black Norwegians
- Black Poles
- Afro-Portuguese people
- Black people in Romania
- Black people in Russia
- Black Scottish people
- Black Spanish people
- Black Swedes
- Black Africans in Switzerland
- Africans in Turkey (Zanj)
- Afro-Ukrainians
- Black Welsh people

== See also ==
- African diaspora
- African admixture in Europe
- African immigration to Europe
- Black people in ancient Roman history
- White Africans of European ancestry
