= Git (song) =

Song by Candan Erçetin

from the album Kırık Kalpler Durağında
- Released: 2011
- Genre: Pop
- Length: 4:26
- Label: Pasaj Müzik
- Composer: Candan Erçetin
- Lyricist: Cemal Safi

"Git" (Turkish: Go) is a song by Turkish singer Candan Erçetin from her sixth studio album, Kırık Kalpler Durağında (2009). The song's lyrics were written by Cemal Safi and its music composed by Erçetin, with arrangement by Alper Erinç.

A music video for "Git," the third from the album, was released in 2011. It was directed by Bozkurt Bayer and Cihangir Ateşağaoğlu.

== Track listing ==
- Album version
1. "Git" – 4:26

== Credits and personnel ==
Credits are adapted from the Kırık Kalpler Durağında album booklet.

- Cemal Safi – writer
- Candan Erçetin – composer
- Alper Erinç – arrangement, guitar
- Nedim Nalbantoğlu – violin
- Mehmet Akatay – percussion
- Pasaj Müzik – production

== In the media ==
The song was featured on Beyaz Show, where Turkish comedian Beyazıt Öztürk performed a parody with altered lyrics. Erçetin responded to the parody, leading to a long-running comedic exchange with Öztürk.

The original music video for "Git" depicts Erçetin driving a car and singing about a breakup. In Öztürk's version, he appears in the passenger seat, replying with excuses. He apologizes in a French accent, referencing Erçetin’s reputation for recording French-language covers and albums.

Erçetin replied by appearing on Beyaz Show and staging a mock "takeover" of the studio. She also imitated a French accent in her response. On 26 December 2014, Öztürk answered by asking her to return the studio couch, with support from a group of male audience members.

As the exchange gained popularity, several Turkish musicians, actors, and comedians joined the video responses. On 9 January 2015, Erçetin released another parody video, filmed at her home during a tea party with her female supporters Demet Akbağ, Saba Tümer, Esra Erol, Derya Şensoy, and Gupse Özay. In the video, she jokingly claimed that the channel was considering canceling Beyaz Show, which had been on air for nearly 20 years, and replacing it with a documentary. She ended with a rhyme containing many instances of the letter "r", mocking Öztürk’s well-known difficulty pronouncing it.

On 16 January 2015, Öztürk responded with support from Ali İhsan Varol, Hayko Cepkin, Mustafa Üstündağ, Mansur Ark, Emre Karayel, and Nuri Alço. Ümit Besen later appeared, shifting the parody briefly to his song "Nikah Masası". The response also incorporated the folk song "Hacı Aga (Tavukları Pişirmişem)".

On 23 January 2015, Erçetin released a final response featuring a group of elderly women cast as "mothers". In the video, Öztürk’s previous supporters—Varol, Cepkin, Üstündağ, and Karayel—were digitally inserted as children being scolded. Emel Sayın then appeared, advising Erçetin to reconcile with Öztürk and briefly singing "Mavi Boncuk". Footballer Demba Ba also made a cameo, while Mazhar Alanson, Fuat Güner, Özkan Uğur, Ata Demirer, Cem Yılmaz, and Yılmaz Erdoğan encouraged Erçetin to forgive Öztürk. The second part of her response aired live on Beyaz Show, where Erçetin and Öztürk sang together and ended the comedic rivalry.

On 5 June 2015, long after the main exchange had concluded, Öztürk briefly revived the parody during the season finale of Beyaz Show.
