= Outline of African diaspora =

Spread of people with African heritage

The following outline is provided as an overview of and topical guide to African diaspora:

The African diaspora is the worldwide collection of communities that descended from people from Africa. The term most commonly refers to emigrants of people of African heritage but could also refer to descendants of enslaved Africans. Scholars typically identify "four circulatory phases" of this migration out of Africa.

The phrase African diaspora gradually entered common usage at the turn of the 21st century. The term diaspora originates from the Greek word διασπορά (diaspora, "scattering") which gained popularity in English in reference to the Jewish diaspora before being more broadly applied to other populations. Less commonly, the term has been used in scholarship to refer to more recent emigration from Africa.

== Overview ==
- Black people
- African diaspora

== Black diasporans by region ==
=== Americas ===
==== North America ====
- Afro-Guatemalan
- Afro-Honduran
- Belizean Kriol people
- Cimarron people
- Black ladinos
- African American
- African immigrants
- Afro-American peoples of the Americas
- Afro-Mexican
- Atlantic Creole
- Bahamian American
- Barbadian American
- Black Canadians
- Black Indians in the United States
- Black Nova Scotians
- Black Seminoles
- Dominickers
- Gullah
- Haitian Americans
- Haitian Canadian
- Jamaican American
- Jamaican Canadian
- Louisiana Creole people
- Nigerian American
- Trinidadian American
- Trinidadian Canadian
- Melungeon
- Afro-Panamanians
- Afro-Nicaraguans
- Afro–Costa Ricans
- Afro-Salvadorans

==== South America ====
- Afro Argentine
- Afro-Brazilian
- Afro Bolivian
- Afro-Colombian
- Afro-Ecuadorian people
- Afro-Guyanese
- Afro-Peruvian
- Garifuna people
- Palenquero
- Pardo
- Afro-Venezuelans
- Afro-Chileans
- Afro-Uruguayans
- Afro-Surinamese people

==== Caribbean (West Indies) ====
- Afro–Antiguans and Barbudans
- Afro-Bahamian
- Afro-Barbadian
- Afro-Caribbean leftism
- Afro-Caribbean
- Afro-Caribbean music
- Afro-Cuban
- Afro-Dominican (Dominica)
- Afro-Dominican (Dominican Republic)
- Afro-Puerto Rican
- Afro-Saint Lucian
- Afro-Trinidadian and Tobagonian
- Afro-Vincentian
- Barbados
- Bahamas
- Dominica
- Dominican Republic
- Haiti
- Jamaicans of African ancestry
- Maroons
- Papiamento
- Puerto Rico

=== Asia ===
- Africans in Guangzhou
- Afro-Asian
- Lashar
- Siddi
- Africans in Malaysia
- Black people in Japan
- Afro-Iranians

=== Europe ===
- Italians of African descent
- Afro-Greeks
- Afro-French
- Afro-Germans
- Portuguese of Black African ancestry
- Black British
- Africans in Europe
- Black people in Ireland
- British African-Caribbean community
- Afro-Romanians
- Afro-Spaniards
- Afro-Russians
- Afro-Ukrainians
- Black Belgians
- Afro-Norwegian
- Africans in Finland
- Afro-Turks
- African immigrants to Switzerland
- African immigrants to Sweden
- African immigration to Israel

== History ==
- Pre-Columbian Africa-Americas contact theories
- African American history
- COINTELPRO
- Indian Ocean slave trade
- Trans-Saharan slave trade
- Atlantic slave trade
- Barbados Slave Code
- Brown v. Board of Education
- Christianity and slavery
- George Floyd protests
- History of slavery
- Los Angeles riots of 1992
- Mass racial violence in the United States
- Plantation economy
- Plessy v. Ferguson
- Quilombo Dos Palmares
- Racial segregation in the United States
- Racism in the United States
- Rodney King
- Rosewood massacre
- Slavery in Brazil
- Slavery in Canada
- Slavery in the British and French Caribbean
- Slavery in the British Virgin Islands
- Slavery in the Spanish New World colonies
- Slavery in the United States
- Sugar plantations in the Caribbean
- Triangular trade
- Tulsa race massacre
- Watts Riots

=== Political and social movements ===
==== United States ====
- Abolitionism
- Abolitionism in the United Kingdom
- Abolitionism in the United States
- Affirmative action
- African American leftism
- African Americans in the United States Congress
- Timeline of the civil rights movement
- Civil rights movement (1896–1954)
- Civil rights movement
- American Anti-Slavery Society
- Black Guerrilla Family
- Black Hebrew Israelites
- Black Liberation Army
- Black Liberators
- Black Lives Matter
- Islam in the African diaspora
- Black Panther Party
- Civil rights movement in Omaha, Nebraska
- Congressional Black Caucus
- Five Percenters
- "Great Migrations":
  - The original Great Migration, 1910–1930
  - The Second Great Migration, 1941–1970
  - The New Great Migration, 1980–present
- Historical Black Press Foundation
- National Association for the Advancement of Colored People
- Nation of Islam
- Police brutality
- Rainbow/PUSH
- Pennsylvania Abolition Society
- Southern Christian Leadership Conference (SCLC)
- The Communist Party and African-Americans
- League of Revolutionary Black Workers
- Underground Railroad
- 100 Black Men of America

==== Caribbean ====
- African Caribbean leftism
- Raizal
- Rastafari movement

==== Other movements ====
- Back-to-Africa movement
- Black anarchism
- Black leftism
- Black nationalism
- Black populism
- Black Power
- Black pride
- Black separatism
- Black supremacy
- Black theology
- Historically black colleges and universities
- Neo Black Movement of Africa
- One-drop rule
- The 1990 Trust
- United Negro College Fund

== Culture ==
- African American art
- African American culture
- African American history
- African American music
- Africanisms
- Afro
- Afro-American religion
- Afro-textured hair
- Black people
- Black church
- Black rage (law)
- Capoeira
- Dreadlocks
- Stereotypes of African Americans
- African characters in comics
- List of black animated characters
- List of black video game characters

=== Cinema and theater ===
- Blackface
- Blaxploitation
- L.A. Rebellion
- List of films about Black girlhood
- Race film

Film festivals

- American Black Film Festival, Los Angeles
- Hollywood Black Film Festival, Los Angeles

=== Music ===
- African American music
- Afro-Caribbean music
- Bachata
- Baila music
- Black British music
- Bouyon
- Capoeira music
- Compas
- Gaita
- Gospel music
  - Negro Spirituals
- Gwo ka
- Hip hop
  - Miami bass
  - List of hip hop genres
- Jazz
  - Bebop
  - Blues
  - Bossa nova
  - Latin jazz
  - Salsa
  - Zydeco
- Liwa
- Music of the African diaspora
- Reggae
  - Calypso
  - Chutney Soca
  - Dancehall
  - Extempo
  - Ragga
  - Reggaeton
  - Ska
  - Soca
  - Spouge
- Rock and roll
- Rumba
- Rhythm and blues
  - Contemporary R&B
  - Funk
  - Neo soul
  - New jack swing
  - Soul music
- Samba
- Zouk

=== Sports ===
- Bajan stick licking
- Black players in American professional football
- Brazilian Jiu-Jitsu
- Esporte Clube Bahia
- History of African Americans in the Canadian Football League
- List of black college football classics
- Negro league baseball

=== Science and mathematics ===
- List of African-American mathematicians
- Mathematicians of the African Diaspora
- List of African American inventors and scientists

== Other related terms ==
- African admixture in Europe
- African American Vernacular English
- Africoid peoples
- Amos 'n' Andy
- Black billionaires
- Black people
- Capoid race
- Colored
- Creole peoples
- Ebonics
- Golliwogg
- Lawn jockey
- Maroons
- Minstrel show
- Mulatto
- Multiracial
- Nation language
- Negrescence
- Negrito
- Négritude
- Negro
- Negrophilia
- Negro Mountain
- Negroid
- Passing
- Redbone
- Stepin Fetchit
- Zanj
- Zanj Rebellion

== See also ==
- List of Afro-Latinos
- List of African-American firsts
- List of black Academy Award winners and nominees
- List of black animated characters
- List of black superheroes
- Black billionaires
- List of historically black colleges and universities
- Index of African-American-related articles
- List of African American Greek and fraternal organizations
- List of topics related to Africa
- The Young Friends Society of African Diasporan Institutions
