= The Young Friends Society of African Diasporan Institutions =

- Formation: 2007
- Type: Arts and Cultural Organization
- Location: Philadelphia, PA; New Orleans, LA; New York, NY
- Website: www.youngfriendssociety.org

The Young Friends Society of African Diasporan Institutions (YFS) exists to support, serve and promote African Diasporan cultural, historical, economic, educational, and community-based institutions through fundraising, event planning, educational and social programming. YFS also serves as a vehicle to promote networking opportunities and leadership development among its members to further strengthen the communities where these institutions are located. YFS is composed of individuals in their twenties, thirties and forties.

== African diasporan institutions ==
African Diasporan Institutions are cultural, historic, educational, and economic institutions and organizations that are located in cities around the world that have large populations of people African descent. These institutions include but are not limited to museums, historical societies, theatre companies, dance companies, libraries and archives and performing arts groups.

== YFS history ==
YFS began as an auxiliary group at the African American Museum of Philadelphia (AAMP). While working as the educational coordinator at AAMP, Shantrelle P. Lewis witnessed a lack of young adult visitors. Following in the tradition of other arts and cultural organizations, Lewis developed a plan to attract a younger demographic that could inject a new energy into the museum. YFS held its inaugural event, Soul Simpatico, in October 2005, and within a year it had brought in 100 new members to AAMP.

As the organization grew, it became apparent that similar institutions in Philadelphia needed innovative ways to engage young adults looking for alternatives to the conventional nightlife scene of clubs and bars. In January 2007, YFS incorporated as a Pennsylvania non-profit organization and secured 501(c)3 status by June of the same year. Over the next two years, YFS partnered with various cultural organizations in Philadelphia, grew its membership base and held several successful events. YFS also started chapters in New Orleans and New York City, with plans to expand domestically and internationally.

== Past YFS events ==
- Black and White Affair: The Harlem Renaissance Revisited
- R.E.D. Affair: Welcome to Storyville
- Shootout: A Photography Exhibition
- Soul Simpatico
- W.E.B. DuBois Lecture Series
- Wines of the World
- YFS Fest

== See also ==
- List of topics related to the Black Diaspora
- African diaspora
- African and Black Diaspora
- African Diaspora Archaeology Newsletter
- Africana womanism
- African-American history
- Afro Americans in the Americas
- Africans
- African American
- Australians of African descent
- African immigration to the United States
- Afro-Latino
- Black People
- Black Hispanic
- Afro-Brazilian
- Afro-Puerto Rican
- Afro-Trinidadian
- Afro-Jamaicans
- Afro-Arab
- Afro-Belizean
- Garinagu
- Afro-Colombian and Raizal
- Afro-Cuban
- Afro-Ecuadorian
- Afro-German
- Indo-African (disambiguation)
- Afro-Irish
- Italians of African descent
- Afro-Mexican
- Afro-Peruvian
- Afro-Turks
- Black British
- Afro-Guyanese
- Black Canadian
- Afro-European
- Afro-French
- Black people in Ireland
- Afro-Russians
- Beta Israel
- Capoid
- Chagossians
- Dougla
- Negroid
- Siddi (Black African community in South Asia)
