= Kırık Kalpler Durağında =

Studio album by Candan Erçetin
- Released: 16 December 2009
- Genre: Pop · folk · hip hop
- Length: 72:06
- Label: Pasaj

Candan Erçetin chronology
Aman Doktor (2005)	Kırık Kalpler Durağında (2009)	Aranjman 2011 (2011)

Kırık Kalpler Durağında (At the Stop of Broken Hearts) is the sixth studio album by Turkish singer Candan Erçetin. It was released on 16 December 2009 by Pasaj Müzik. It was her second studio album released by this company, and her first major work since the 2004 release of Melek. The album features elements of pop music, folk music and hip hop. Candan Erçetin is the album's major songwriter, having written ten of its songs on her own. Out of these ten songs, six of them were composed by her as well. All of the songs were arranged by Alper Erinç.

Containing 16 songs in total, Kırık Kalpler Durağında received generally positive reviews from critics, who believed that the main difference of this album with Erçetin's previous work was the greater use of Balkan music elements. The first single that was released from the album was "Ben Kimim", which was used on the soundtrack of the 2009 movie Gölgesizler and ranked second on Billboard Türkçe Top 20. Another song from the album, "Kader", was used on the soundtrack of the movie Kaptan Feza (2010). After releasing music videos for these two songs, Erçetin made two more music videos for the album: "Kırık Kalpler Durağında" and "Git".

In Kırık Kalpler Durağında, Erçetin included a new version of "Unutama Beni", originally performed by Esmeray. For the song "Gözler", verses from the poems of Neyzen Tevfik and Omar Khayyam were used. Over 100,000 copies of the album were ordered in the music markets, and it ranked first on D&R Best-Selling list in Turkey. The album continued to remain among the top ten by the end of 2010. It also was nominated for the Best Album award at the 2010 Kral Music Awards and Radio Boğaziçi Awards. The album earned Erçetin the Best Female Turkish Pop Music Soloist award at the 2010 Golden Butterfly Awards.

== Background and content ==
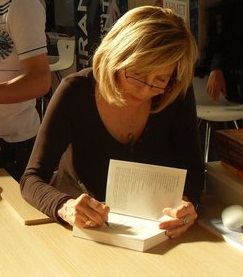
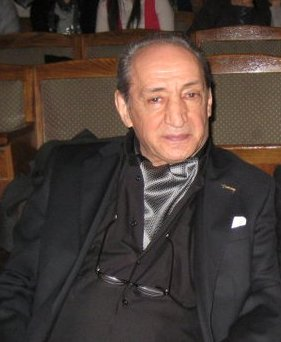
Ayşe Kulin (left) wrote the song "Bahar", while Cemal Safi (right) wrote the lyrics for "Git".

Candan Erçetin released her fifth studio album Melek in 2004, and continued her career by releasing the albums Remix'5 and Aman Doktor in 2005. Between 2007–08 she presented the program Beraber ve Solo Şarkılar on TRT 1; she then performed the song "Gelmiyorsun" for the album Çeyrek (2007) and "Kim" on the album Söz Müzik Teoman (2008). In November 2008, she wrote and composed the song "Ben Kimim", which was used on the soundtrack of the 2009 movie Gölgesizler. The song was made available on her website for free. In June 2009, it was reported that the recordings for Candan Erçetin's new album were not finished and the album would be released by the end of summer. In December 2009, new information about the album were released.

I have been silent for 5 years, 5 months, 27 days. I live, see, feel, think, write, but I keep quiet. I think it's time to say something.

— Candan Erçetin, from Kırık Kalpler Durağında's album booklet.

After recording the album over the course of six months, Kırık Kalpler Durağında was released on 16 December 2009 by Pasaj Müzik. Containing sixteen songs in total, its main songwriter is Erçetin herself, who wrote ten of the album's songs on her own and another one together with Aylin Atalay. Besides Erçetin and Atalay, Cemal Safi, Şemi Diriker, Neyzen Tevfik, Omar Khayyam, Ayşe Kulin and Sinan were the figures whose poems and lyrics were used in the songs. Aside from writing, Erçetin also composed four of the songs on her own and three of them together with the album's music arranger Alper Erinç. The song "Unutama Beni", which had originally appeared in Esmeray's Kağıt Mendil (1993) was performed again by Erçetin and included in the album. The song "Gözler" featured verses from poems of Neyzen Tevfik and Omar Khayyam. Erçetin rapped on the song "Ninni", written by Aylin Atalay and herself, and different metaphors were used in the lyrics as well. Cemal Safi wrote the lyrics for "Git", while Ayşe Kulin wrote the song "Bahar". The song "Roka Mandolina", which was initially performed by Suzan Kardeş for her 2008 album Bekriya II - Balkania, was turned into Turkish and included in the album under the title "Vay Halime".

Featuring elements of pop music, folk music and hip hop, Kırık Kalpler Durağında was ordered over 100,000 times in the markets. It topped D&R Best-Selling list in Turkey, and continued to remain among the top ten on the list by the end of 2010. It was nominated for the Best Album award at the 2010 Kral Music Awards and the Radio Boğaziçi Music Awards, but lost the first one to Mustafa Ceceli's first studio album, and the second one to Yalın's Ben Bugün respectively. The album earned Erçetin the Best Female Turkish Pop Music Soloist award at the 2010 Golden Butterfly Awards.

== Critical reception ==
Kırık Kalpler Durağında received generally positive reviews from music critics, though the views on the album's cover were different. Music website Gerçek Pop published a review in which it was said that Erçetin had passed the "pause phase" in her career and gave the album three stars out of five. It also stated that the album was "a work that many young artists should take note from" and praised Erçetin's "friendly pose" on the cover. The website compared "Git" to Erçetin's hits in the 2000s, and viewed the songs "Unutama Beni", "Vallahi" and "Yalvaramam" as "serious stumbles" in this album. It was also stated that the album would add "only a few highlights to the singer's discography", and except the song "Ninni" nothing new could be found in it. Radioman Michael Kuyucu described Erçetin's new album as "a lottery for her with sixteen new songs after a long period of silence". He stated that he could see the "intellectual line and difference" in this album, and described it as a work that "can be listened to from the beginning to the end". He believed that major parts of the album featured elements of Balkan music and this was the fundamental difference between Kırık Kalpler Durağında and Candan Erçetin's previous albums. Milliyet's Asu Maro wrote that he was obsessed with the album. He stated that it had aimed to affect "broken hearts" and there was a sense of "maturity" in the songs. Mehmet Tez from the same newspaper wrote a negative review for the album's cover and described the songs as "new but nostalgic". Another Milliyet journalist, Sezin Sivri, wrote that the work was "something that could be played again and again, an album that could be listened several times". She also named "Bahar" as her favorite song from the album.

== Music videos ==
Candan Erçetin released four music videos for Kırık Kalpler Durağında. The first music video was made for the song "Ben Kimim", which was used on the soundtrack of Gölgesizler (2009). The music video was first shown in January 2009 on Beyaz Show. The song ranked second on Billboard Türkçe Top 20 and remained on the chart for five weeks. The second music video was prepared for the song "Kader", which was written and composed by Candan Erçetin and included in the soundtrack of Kaptan Feza (2010). The music video was directed by Ümit Ünal, and recorded in one of the locations that had been used during shooting of Kaptan Feza.

The third music video was prepared for the song after which the album was named, "Kırık Kalpler Durağında". The song was written and composed by Erçetin and a nominee for the Best Lyrics award at the 2010 Kral Music Awards. The music video was recorded over the course of two days at the Haydarpaşa railway station. The video was directed by Cihangir Ateşağaoğlu and Bozkurt Bayer. Bayer had previously directed many of Erçetin's music videos, including "Elbette" (Elbette, 2000), "Gamsız Hayat" (Neden, 2002) and "Melek" (Melek, 2004). The final music video was made for the song "Git", written by Cemal Safi and composed by Erçetin. The video was released in March 2011. It was directed by Bozkurt Bayer and Cihangir Ateşağaoğlu and recorded in Istanbul over the course of three days.

== Track listing ==
No.	Title	Writer(s)	Composer(s)	Length
1.	"Kırık Kalpler Durağında"	Candan Erçetin	Erçetin	5:08
2.	"Git"	Cemal Safi	Erçetin	4:29
3.	"Kader"	Erçetin	Erçetin	4:12
4.	"Unutama Beni"	Şemi Diriker	Diriker	4:21
5.	"Vallahi"	Erçetin	Erçetin · Alper Erinç	4:30
6.	"Yalvaramam"	Erçetin	Flavio Santander	4:43
7.	"Gözler"	Erçetin	Erçetin · Erinç	3:54
8.	"Türkü"	Neyzen Tevfik · Ömer Hayyam	Erçetin	3:46
9.	"Vay Halime"	Erçetin	Anonymous	5:07
10.	"Unutursun"	Erçetin	Erçetin	4:00
11.	"Bahar"	Ayşe Kulin	Erçetin	4:17
12.	"Kimin Doğrusu"	Erçetin	Nurettin Irmak	4:10
13.	"Özür Dilerim"	Erçetin	Mustafa Süder	5:03
14.	"Nedense Sustum"	Sinan	Erçetin · Erinç	5:28
15.	"Ben Kimim"	Erçetin	Erçetin	4:28
16.	"Ninni"	Aylin Atalay · Erçetin · Anonymous	Anonymous	4:30
Total length:				72:06

== Personnel ==
- Pasaj Müzik – production
- Dünya Müzik – producer
- Candan Erçetin – artist, songwriter, composer
- Cemal Safi – songwriter
- Şemi Diriker – songwriter, composer
- Ayşe Kulin – songwriter
- Sinan – songwriter
- Neyzen Tevfik – songwriter
- Ömer Hayyam – songwriter
- Aylin Atalay – songwriter
- Nurettin Irmak – composer, electric piano
- Flavio Santander – composer
- Alper Erinç – composer, arranger, guitarist
- Mustafa Süder – composer, string instruments, violin solo
- Alper Gemici – arranger
- Derya Türkan – classic kemenche
- Mehmet Akatay – percussion
- Nedim Nalbantoğlu – string instruments
- Ayşen Tözeniş – string instruments
- Alexandr Samoylenko – string instruments
- Ceren Gürkan – string instruments
- Yonca Aktunç – string instruments
- Veysel Samanlıoğlu – violin solo
- Gündem – violin group
- Çakır 3 – wind instruments group
- Erkut Gökgöz – trumpet
- Neşko – accordion
- Havva Karakaş – vocals
- Ayşe Evrim Akaçça – viola, bowed string instruments arrangement
- Yaren Budak – viola
- Pınar Bayraktar – violoncello
- Erman İmayhan – violoncello
- Ali Yılmaz – gold thread, arpeggio bağlama
- Uğur Gülbaharlı – piano
- Cengiz Tural – drums

Credits adapted from Kırık Kalpler Durağında's album booklet.

== Charts ==
Chart (2010)	Peak position
Turkey (D&R Best-Selling)	1

== Release history ==
Country	Date	Format	Label
Turkey	16 December 2009	CD, digital download	Pasaj Müzik
Worldwide	16 December 2009	Digital download	Pasaj Müzik
