= Afro-Austrians =

Austrians with sub-Saharan African descent

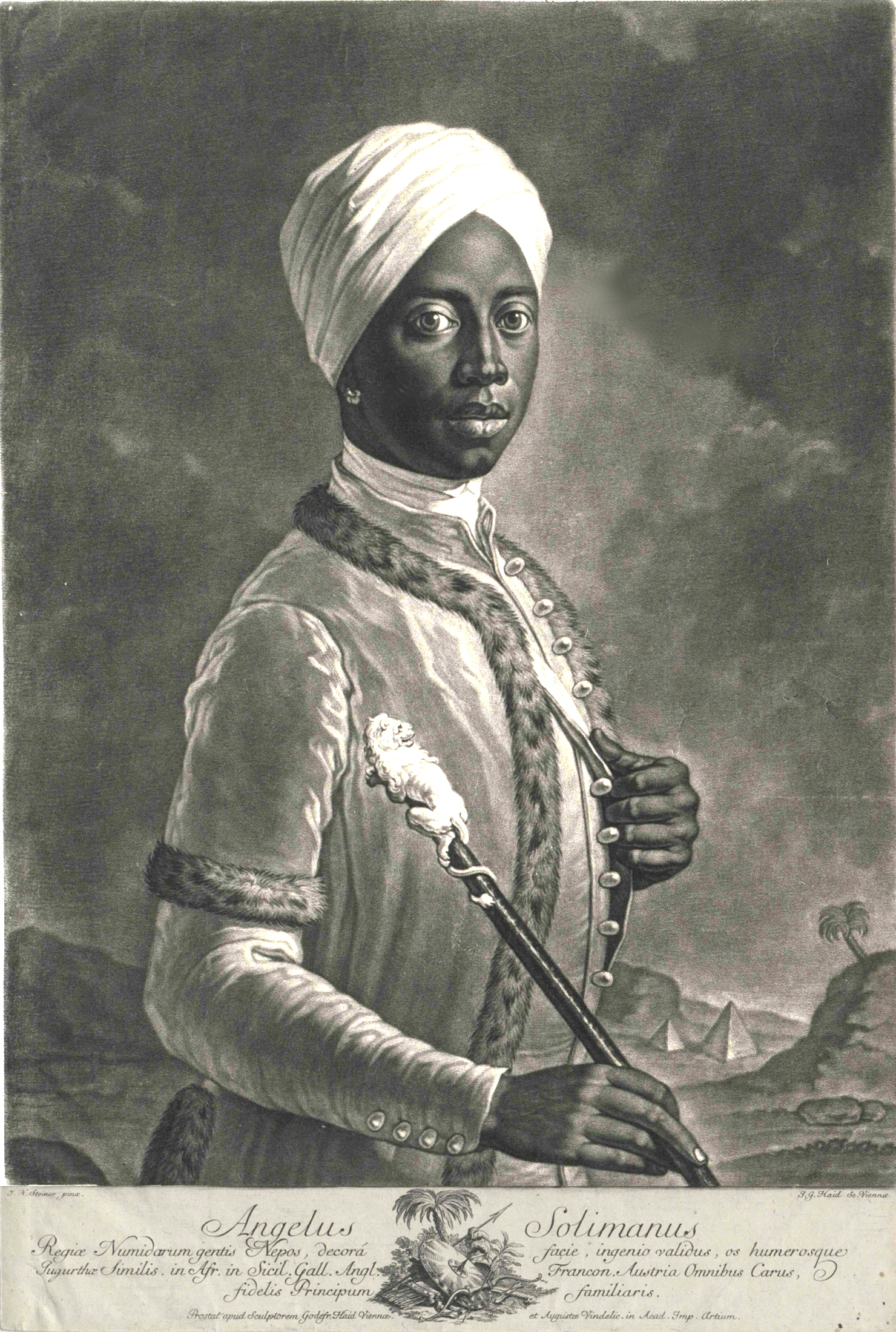
Angelo Soliman, an African-born Austrian Freemason and courtier

The term Afro-Austrian or Black Austrian refers to Austrians of sub-Saharan African descent. In a broader sense, people of West, Central, East, and Southern African origin who live in Austria but do not have Austrian citizenship are also called Afro-Austrians.

== Word origin ==
The term Afro-Austrian was developed in parallel with terms such as Afro-American or Afro-German and is intended, among other things to curb discrimination regarding origin and replace terms such as Negro or Moor. The term “New Austrian” refers not only to people of sub-Saharan descent but also to Austrians who come from other parts of the world.

== History ==
The first documented African immigrant was baptized in St. Stephen's Cathedral in Vienna in 1629; it is assumed that they were an escaped slave of the Ottoman Sultan.

Some of the African-American soldiers stationed in Austria during the Second World War entered into a relationship with Austrian women, whose resulting children were colloquially called War children. After the Second World War, the number of students of African descent in Austria grew from 19 in the winter semester of 1953/54 to almost 640 in 1961/62.

In the last few decades, the number of Africans migrating to Austria has risen sharply (1970: < 100 refugees, 1991: 1,639 refugees). Some reasons for this include the end of the Cold War, the opening of borders, and recent global economic developments.

== Current situation ==
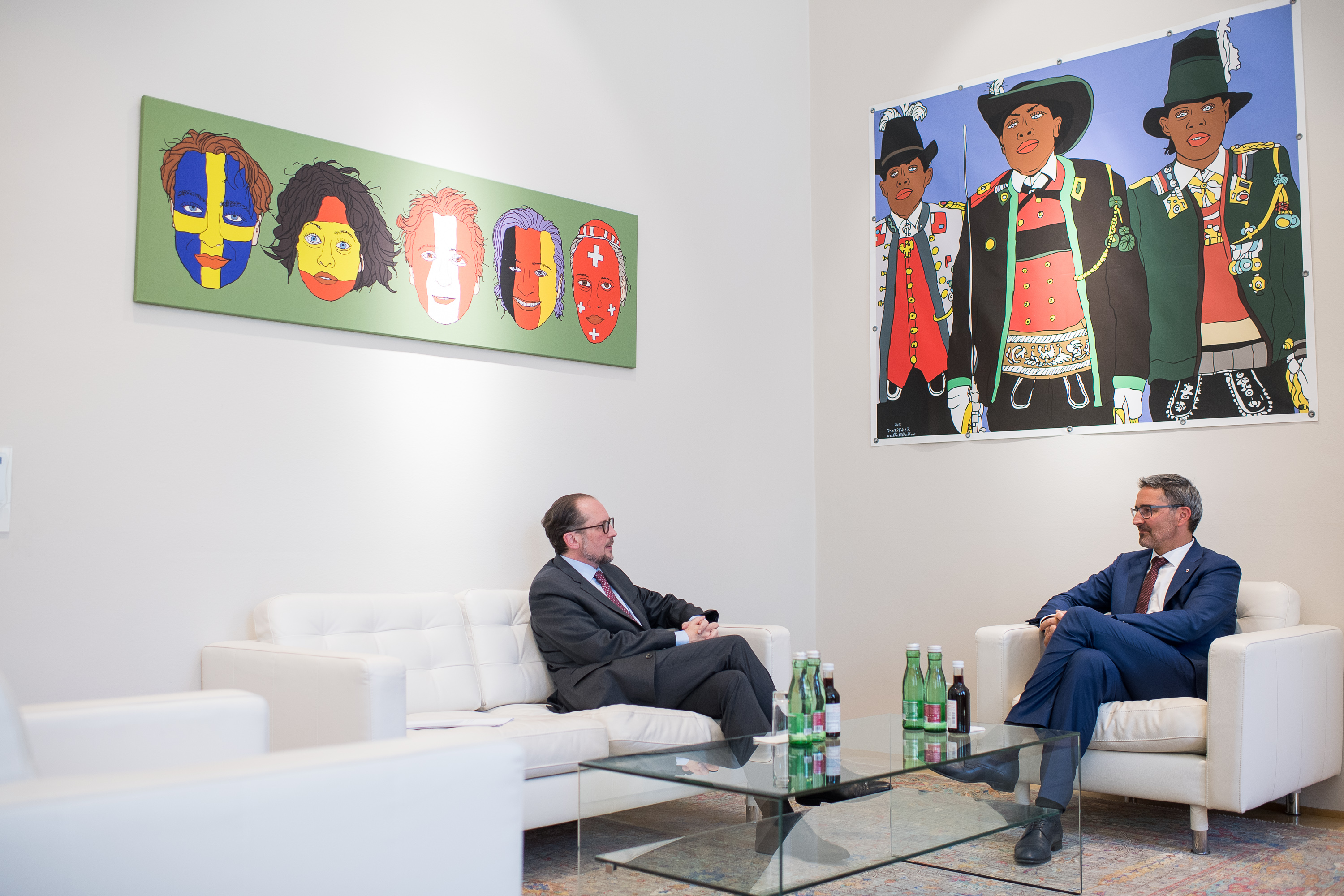
Image Lumina nigra (2013, right) by Klaus Pobitzer in the office of Foreign Minister Alexander Schallenberg (2021)

According to estimates, around 40,000 people with dark skin lived in Austria in 2010, most of them in the Federal Capital.

Recently the number of racist attacks in Austria has increased significantly. According to Erwin Ebermann from the Institute for Cultural and Social Anthropology, reasons for migration are the cause, which have changed over time. This leads to even integrated Austrians of sub-Saharan descent being excluded. A survey from 2012, in which 717 people from Graz, Linz, Salzburg and Innsbruck took part, showed that around 50% of people of African descent feel discriminated against and are racially abused or harassed in public.

The 2022 European Agency for Fundamental Rights (FRA) conducted surveys in 13 EU countries in 2016 and 2022 among people born in sub-Saharan Africa or with at least one parent born there. Across Europe, an average of 47% of respondents in 2022 said they had been discriminated against because of their skin color, origin or religion in the past five years (2016: 36%). These shares were highest in Germany (2022: 77%, 2016: 65%) and in Austria (2022: 76%, 2016: 67%).

== Literature ==
- Ingrid Bauer, „Leiblicher Vater: Amerikaner (Neger)“ Besatzungskinder österreichisch-afroamerikanischer Herkunft. In: Früchte der Zeit. Afrika, Diaspora, Literatur und Migration, hg. v. Helmuth A. Niederle u. a., Wien: WUV Universitätsverlag 2001 (= Wiener Beiträge zur Ethnologie und Anthropologie, 10), ISBN 3-85114-518-6, S. 49–67.
- Erwin Ebermann (Hrsg.): Afrikaner in Wien. Zwischen Mystifizierung und Verteufelung. Lit, Münster 2002, ISBN 3-8258-5712-3 (zahlreiche Leseproben auf afrika-wien.at).

== See also ==
- African Diaspora
- Black Europeans of African ancestry
