= Tarlabaşı =

Neighborhood in Istanbul, Turkey

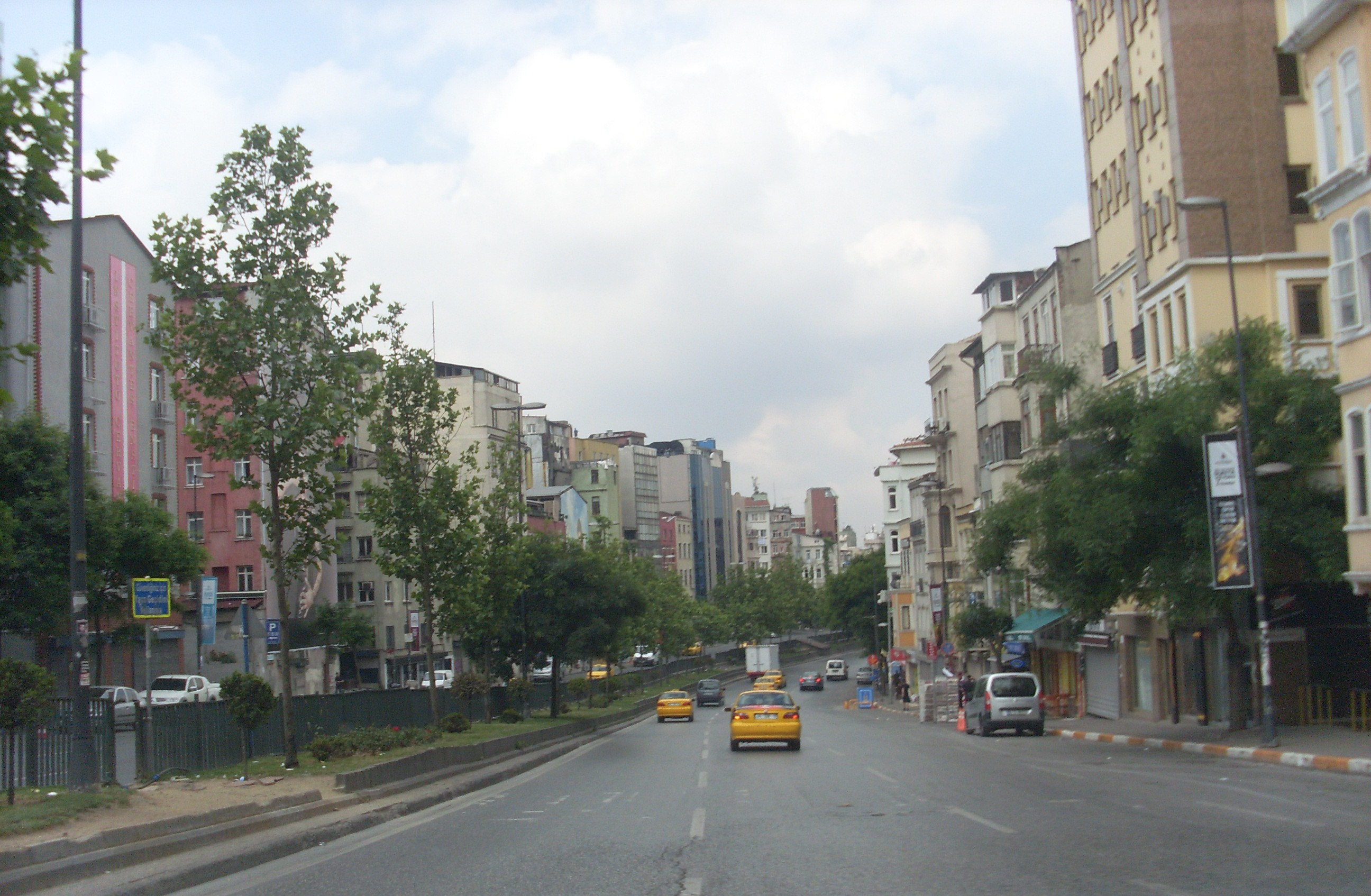
Tarlabaşı Boulevard

Tarlabaşı is a neighbourhood in the Beyoğlu district of Istanbul, Turkey, stretching from Taksim Square and Talimhane in the east to Kasımpaşa and Tepebaşı in the west. On the south side it is separated from İstiklal Caddesi by the four-lane Tarlabaşı Bulvarı (boulevard) while on the north side it is separated from much poorer Dolapdere by Dolapdere Caddesi (street).

In the 1990s, large numbers of Kurdish immigrants from southeastern Turkey moved into Tarlabaşı, joining the pre-existing Romani and Syriac Orthodox populations. More recently, it has absorbed many migrants from neighbouring and African countries. The neighborhood is also home to a sizeable transgender community.

== History ==
In the second half of the 19th century, Tarlabaşı became a new residential area for people of middle and low income, and particularly for non-Muslims such as Jews, Armenians and Greeks. Many residents worked in wealthier neighbourhoods nearby, in particular for the embassies and businesses in and around İstiklal Caddesi. As a result the neighborhood still features many fine, if crumbling, 19th century houses and apartment blocks in a variety of styles including Art Nouveau.

In 1923 the embassies moved to the new capital of Ankara and many people living in Tarlabaşı lost their jobs. In the first half of the 20th century the remaining members of the minority populations were either driven out or chose to leave and many properties fell into decay. From the 1990s onwards many migrants from the southeast of the country took their place, taking advantage of the cheap rents.

In the 1980s while Bedrettin Dalan was Mayor of Istanbul, Tarlabaşı Bulvarı was sliced through the southern side of Tarlabaşı, separating it from the commercial hub of İstiklal Caddesi. Many 19th-century buildings were lost to the development.

Towards the end of the 20th century Tarlabaşı started to experience gentrification which intensified after a large part of the area was designated for formal gentrification in February 2006. This has attracted considerable controversy: "Beyond and against the gentrification policies and the mainstream stigmatization rhetoric of Tarlabaşı, there is a plethora of less visible social relations, gatherings, and gestures of daily commoning practices as well as self-organized refugees’ and locals’ solidarity groups and community centers that claim the right to the center of the city and spatial justice" (Tsavdaroglou, 2020: 235). Once completed, the Tarlabaşı 360 project offered luxury apartments targeted at overseas investors.

Since the 2010s gentrification has been supplemented with touristification as large and small hotels and Airbnb properties have opened in Tarlabaşı, taking advantage of cheap property prices in a city-center location.

== Places of interest ==
On Tatlı Badem (Sweet Almond) Street, there is a museum dedicated to the Polish poet Adam Mickiewicz who died of cholera here in 1855. In 1856 his body was transported to Montmorency in France and then in 1890 to Cracow in Poland, where he was finally buried. Currently the museum is closed.

Reflecting its mixed heritage, Tarlabası is home to three churches, two of them Greek Orthodox (Panagia Evangelistria and Hagioi Konstantinos and Helene) and one of them Syrian Orthodox (Church of the Virgin Mary).

On Sundays, the neighborhood hosts a popular street market with hundreds of vendors.

== Gallery ==
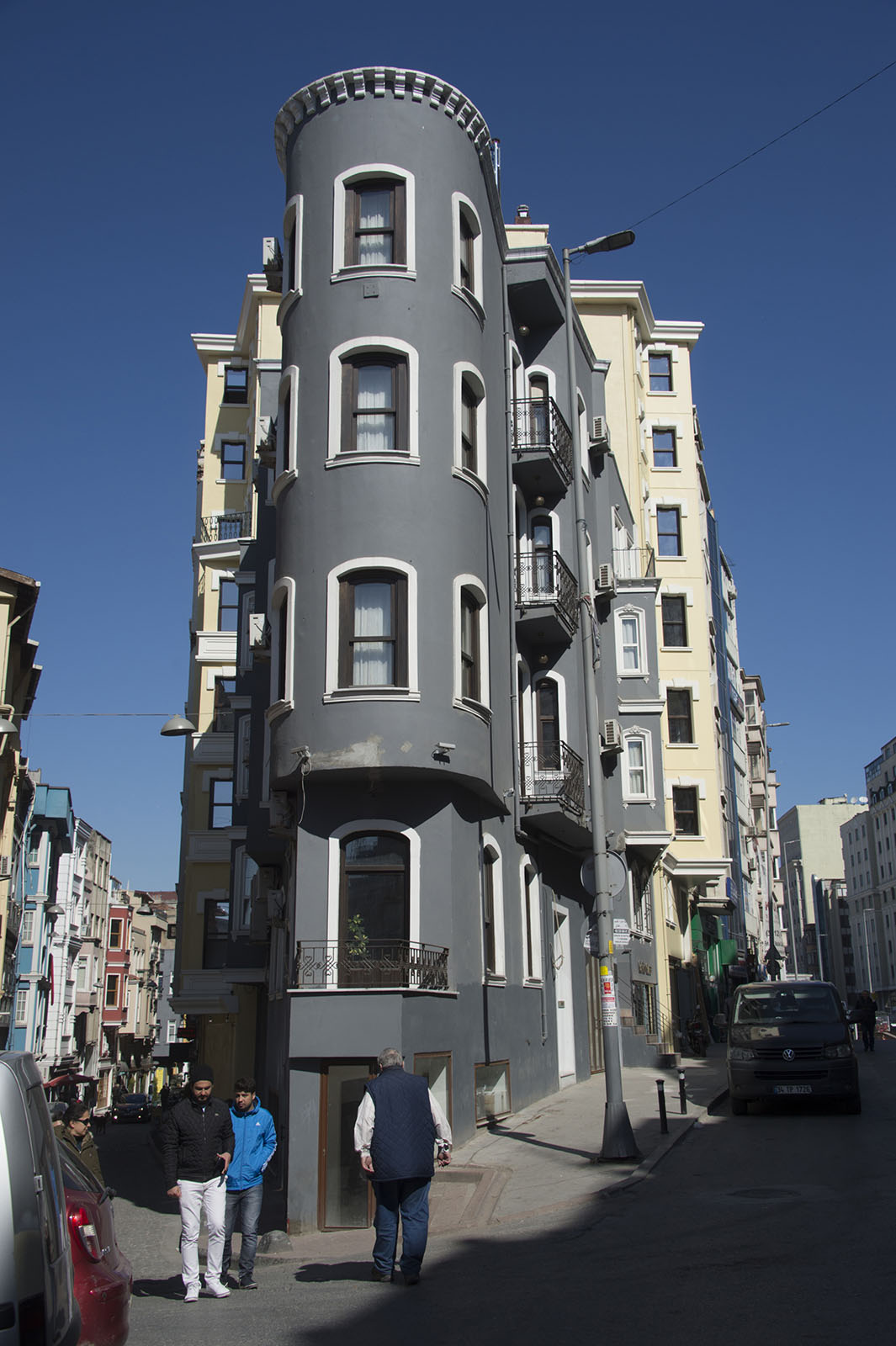
Tarlabaşı Building

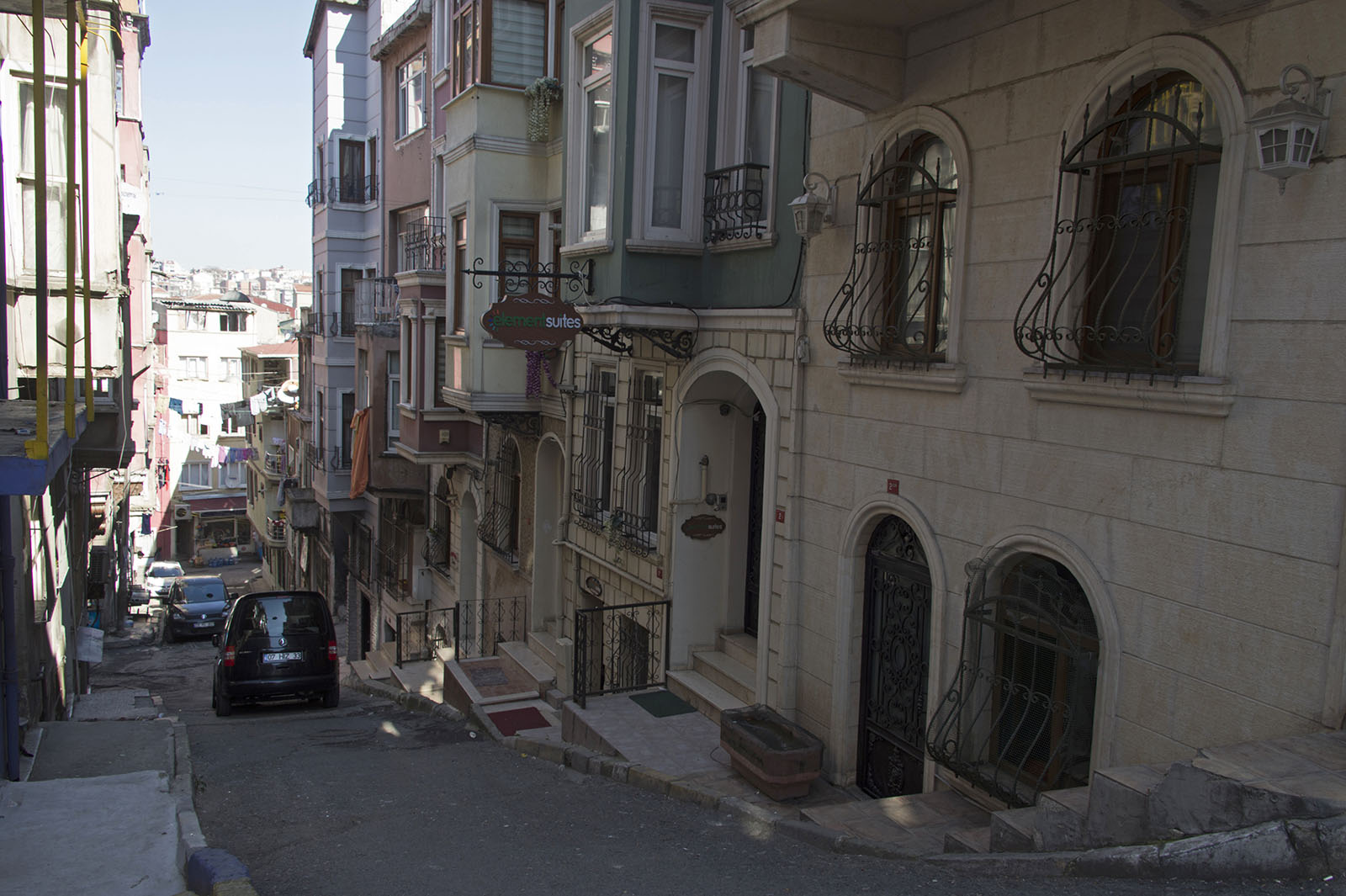
Tarlabaşı Building

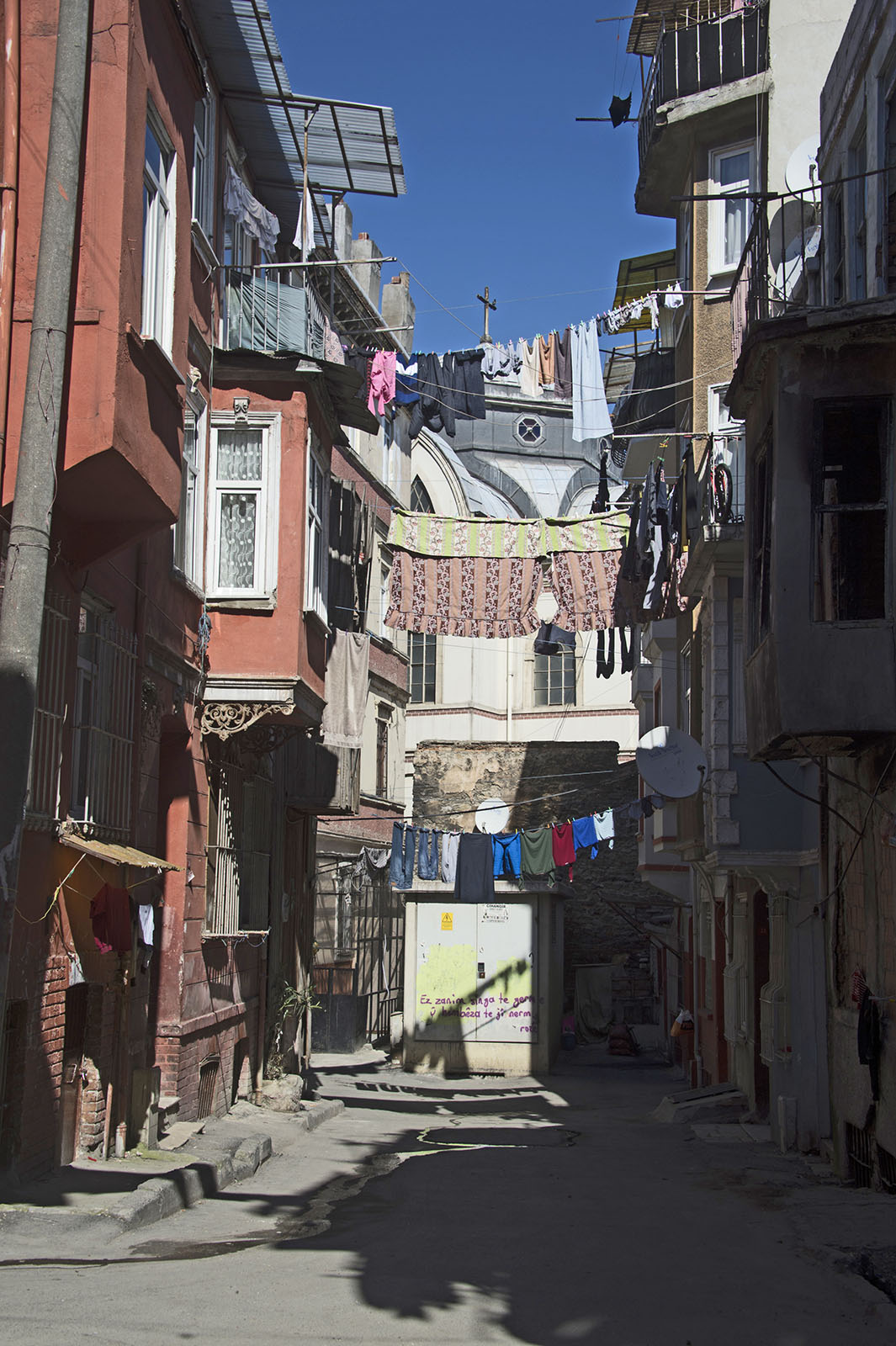
Tarlabaşı Building

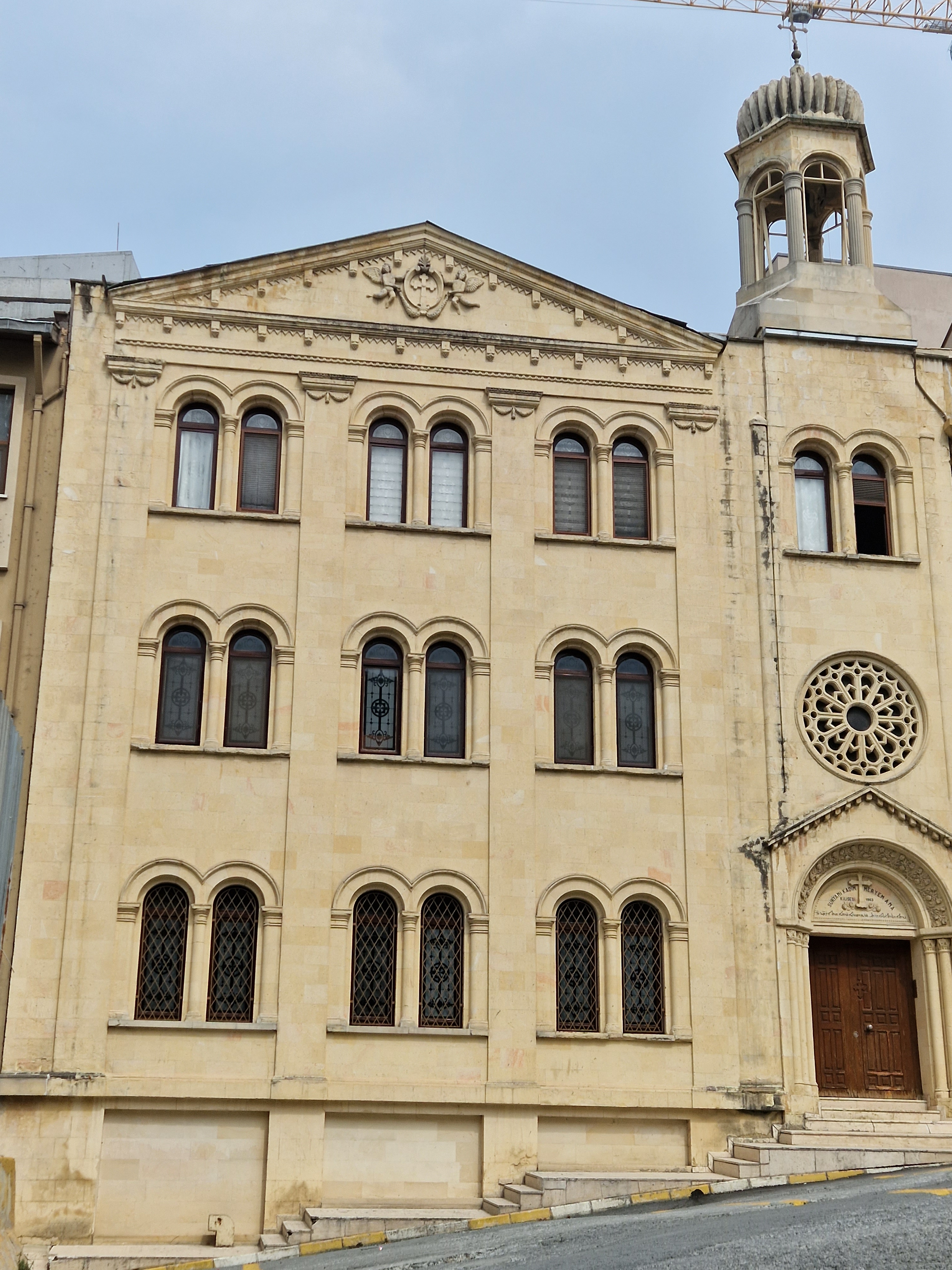
Syriac Orthodox Church of the Virgin Mary
