= Aranjman 2011 =

Album by Candan Erçetin

Studio album by Candan Erçetin
- Released: 7 July 2011
- Language: French, Turkish, some Yiddish
- Label: Pasaj

Candan Erçetin chronology
Kırık Kalpler Durağında (2009)	Aranjman 2011 (2011)	Milyonlarca Kuştuk... (2013)

Aranjman 2011 is an album of cover songs by Turkish singer Candan Erçetin released on 7 July 2011. The album contains bilingual French–Turkish arrangements of French songs which were highly popular in Turkey in the 1960s–1970s.

The version of "Istanbul (Not Constantinople)" that she sings, called here simply "İstanbul", is the French-language arrangement by Marc Fontenoy sung by Dario Moreno with Michel Legrand and his Orchestra in 1955.

== Track listing ==
1. "Ali / Entarisi ala benziyor" (written by Darío Moreno & Jacques Plait, Turkish lyrics anonymous) – 4:26
2. "L'aveugle / Memleketim" (written by Simon Saguy, Turkish lyrics by Fikret Şeneş, Yiddish lyrics anonymous) – 3:37
3. "Volage Volage / Dünya Dönüyor" (written by Marc Aryan, Turkish lyrics by Fecri Ebcioğlu) – 4:03
4. "Les Mouettes De Mikonos / Deniz ve Mehtap" (written by Andre Borly & Armand Canfora & Michel Jourdan, Turkish lyrics by Fecri Ebcioğlu) – 4:07
5. "Tombe La Neige / Her Yerde Kar Var" (written by Salvatore, Turkish lyrics by Fecri Ebcioğlu) – 4:14
6. "Que c'est Triste / Üç Kalp" (written by Patricia Carli, Turkish lyrics by Fecri Ebcioğlu) – 4:17
7. "Sans Toi Je Suis Seul / Sessiz Gemi" (written by Franck Gérald & Patricia Carli, Turkish lyrics by Yahya Kemal Beyatlı) – 3:58
8. "Tu Te Reconnaitras / Göreceksin Kendini" (written by Vline Buggy, Turkish lyrics by Nahman Varon) – 3:34
9. "On S'embrasse Et On Oublie / Hoşgör Sen" (written by Enrico Macias & Yves Dessca, Turkish lyrics by Fikret Şeneş) – 3:20
10. "Car Je Veux / Karlar Düşer" (written by Deboeck & Saintal & Salvatore, Turkish lyrics by Ali Selçuk Özgürdal) – 5:07
11. "C'est Ecrit Dans Le Ciel / Bak Bir Varmış Bir Yokmuş" (written by André Tabet & Georges Tabet & Alec Alstone, Turkish lyrics by Fecri Ebcioğlu) – 3:16
12. "Ce n'est Rien / Yalanmış" (written by Julien Clerc, Turkish lyrics by Reyman Eray) – 3:29
13. "Pourquoi Parler D'amour / Selam Söyle" (written by Enrico Macias & Jean Claudric, Turkish lyrics by Ülkü Aker) – 4:00
14. "İstanbul" (written by Kennedy Jimmy & Simon Nat, French lyrics by Marc Fontenoy [uncredited]) – 3:12

== Sales ==
Country	Sales
Turkey (MÜ-YAP)	59,998
