= Ahmet Ali Çelikten =

First black pilot in history (Afro-Turk aviator)

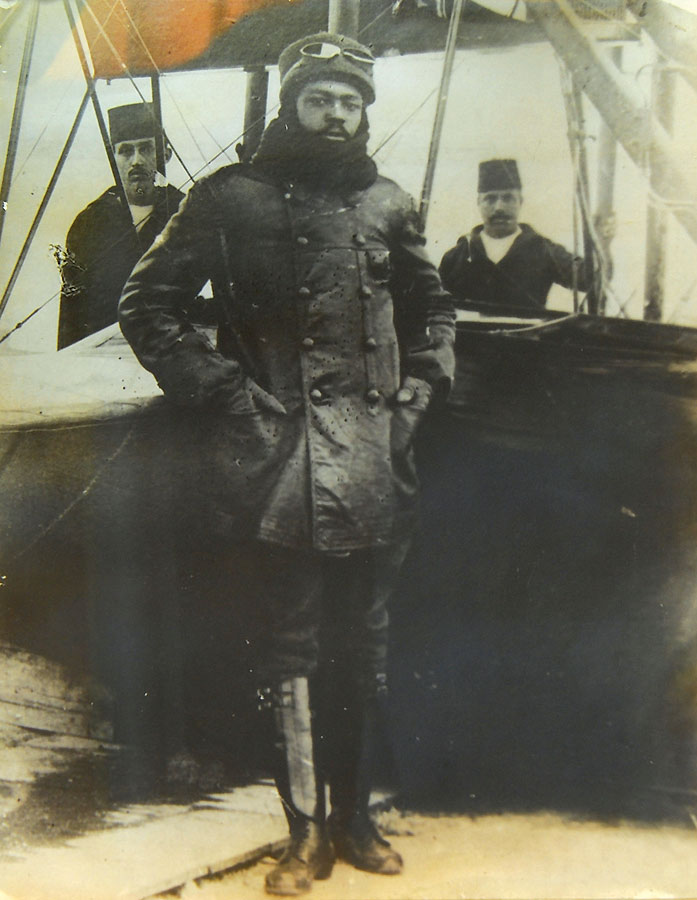
- Captain Çelikten with his flight cap, Yeşilköy Airfield (today Istanbul Atatürk Airport) in 1917
- Born: İzmirli Alioğlu, Ahmed Ali Çelikten; 1883; İzmir, Aydın Vilayet, Ottoman Empire
- Died: 24 June 1969 (aged 85–86); İzmir, Turkey
- Children: Muammer Çelikten; Yılmaz Çelikten; Neriman Çelikten
- Relatives: Mehmet Ali Şeker (nephew)
- Military career
- Allegiance: Ottoman Empire (1904–1920); Turkey (1920–1949)
- Branch: Ottoman Navy; Ottoman Aviation Squadrons; Turkish Navy; Turkish Air Force
- Service years: 1904–1949
- Rank: Colonel
- Nicknames: Arap Ahmet Ali; İzmirli Ahmet Ali; Black Steel Eagle of İzmir; Black Eagle
- Unit: Istanbul Bahri Teyyare Bölüğü
- Conflicts: First World War; Gallipoli campaign; Turkish War of Independence
- Awards: Yellow Navy Medal of the Turkish Navy "Turkish Independence Medal Nr. 480" awarded in 1924 by Mustafa Kemal Atatürk and İsmet İnönü for his actions of valor during the Turkish War of Independence

Ahmet Ali Çelikten (born İzmirli Alioğlu Ahmed; 1883 – 24 June 1969), also known as İzmirli Ali Ahmet (English: Ahmet Ali from İzmir), was a Turkish aviator of Afro-Turkish descent regarded as one of the first black pilots in history. He was one of the first black men to become a fighter pilot, receiving his "wings" in 1914/1915. He was one of the few black pilots in World War I, similar to African American Eugene Jacques Bullard (flying for France), William Robinson Clarke from Jamaica (flying for Britain), Pierre Réjon flying for France and Domenico Mondelli from Eritrea (flying for Italy).

== Biography ==
Ahmet was born in 1883 in İzmir in the Vilayet of Aidin located in the Ottoman Empire. His mother, Zenciye Emine Hanım, was of West African origin; her mother, i.e. Ahmet's maternal grandmother, was a slave taken by Turkish slave traders from her homeland, the Borno Emirate, and sold in the slave markets of Ottoman Istanbul. Ahmet's maternal grandfather is unknown. His father, Ali Bey, was also of mixed Afro-Turkish origin, perhaps mixed Turkish-Somali. The family fled from Cairo to Crete because Egypt was occupied by the French in the years 1798–1801, afterwards moving from Crete to İzmir. He aimed to become a sailor and entered the Naval Technical School Haddehâne Mektebi (lit. "School of the Blooming Mill") in 1904. In 1908, he graduated from this school as a First Lieutenant (Mülâzım-ı evvel). And then he went to aviation courses in the Naval Flight School (Deniz Tayyare Mektebi), formed on 25 June 1914 at Yeşilköy. He was then a member of the Ottoman Air Force.

During World War I, he married Hatice Hanım (1897–1991) who was a Turkish war immigrant from Preveza.

He became one of the first black military pilots in aviation history on 11 November 1916. On 14 February 1917, Ahmet Ali was made a Captain (Yüzbaşı) and was then sent to Berlin on 18 December 1917 to complete aviation courses. Following the completion of these courses, he was assigned to the İzmir Naval Aircraft Company. His code name was Çelik Kara Kartal ("Black Eagle of Steel"), derived from his name.

Following the end of World War I, Ahmet Ali became involved in the Turkish War of Independence and supported the Turkish National Movement. He volunteered as a pilot at the Konya Military Air Base in Konya. At this time, Turkish Nationalists enacted a plan to steal airplanes from Ottoman warehouses and bring them to Amasra, a port town on the Black Sea. Ahmed was sent to Amasra in 1922 in order to assist with this operation. Pilots utilized these airplanes to monitor the Black Sea and protect their naval operations.

Upon the establishment of the Republic of Turkey in 1923, a division was created to move aviation operations from Konya to İzmir. Ahmet was assigned to this division and continued his service in İzmir. In 1928, he was appointed to the Air Undersecretariat, a division of the Turkish Air Force which operated under the Ministry of National Defense. He was honored by the Türkiye Cumhuriyeti İstiklal Madalyası (Medal of Independence) with the Nr: 480 in 1924 by Mustafa Kemal Atatürk and İsmet Inönü for his bravery in the Turkish War of Independence.

Ahmet Ali retired in 1949 as Türk Hava Kuvvetleri Albayı (Colonel) in the Turkish Air Force. He thereafter devoted his time to his family and led a secluded life. He died on 24 June 1969 in İzmir.

== Legacy ==
To quote David Nicolle's book, The Ottoman Army 1904–1918, "Most Ottoman aircrew were recruited from the Turkish heartland ... others came from the Arab provinces of the Ottoman Empire as far south as Yemen, or even from neutral Iran. Captain Ahmet was a mix of Arab-African and Turkish origin and may have been the first 'Black' Air Force pilot in aviation history, having received his 'wings' in 1914-15." The book features a photo of Ahmet in front of a Bleriot XI-2 trainer at the Yeşilköy flying school. The same photo is featured in "Over the Front", Volume 9, No. 3, Fall 1994. Ahmet's "wings" would seem to have been earned prior to Bullard's earning his brevet No. 6259 on 20 July 1917, though Bullard is often cited as history's first black military aviator. Others note how both Ahmet Ali and Bullard were preceded by Domenico Mondelli, from Eritrea (flying for Italy), who was the actual first black pilot and/or military aviator.

== Gallery ==
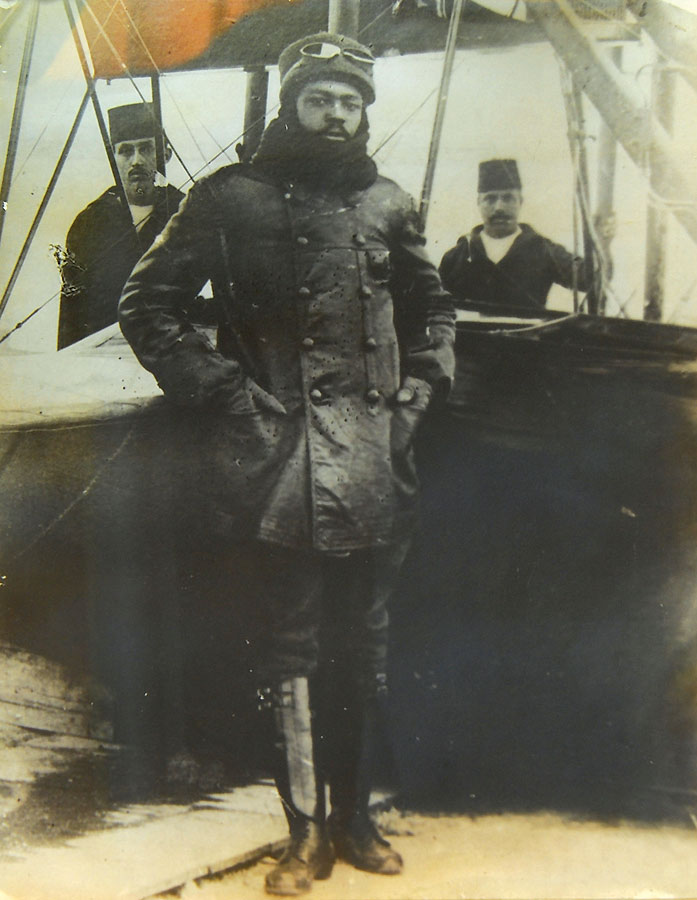
Ahmet Ali in flight suit with officers wearing a fez in the background.

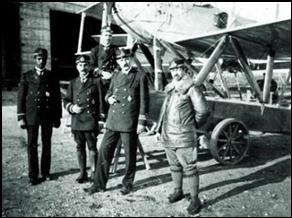
Ottoman naval aviators of the Naval Flight School (Deniz Tayyare Mektebi) at Yeşilköy; left to right: pilot Ahmet Ali (Çelikten), Sami (Uçan), İhsan and observer Hüseyin Kâmil (Görgün).

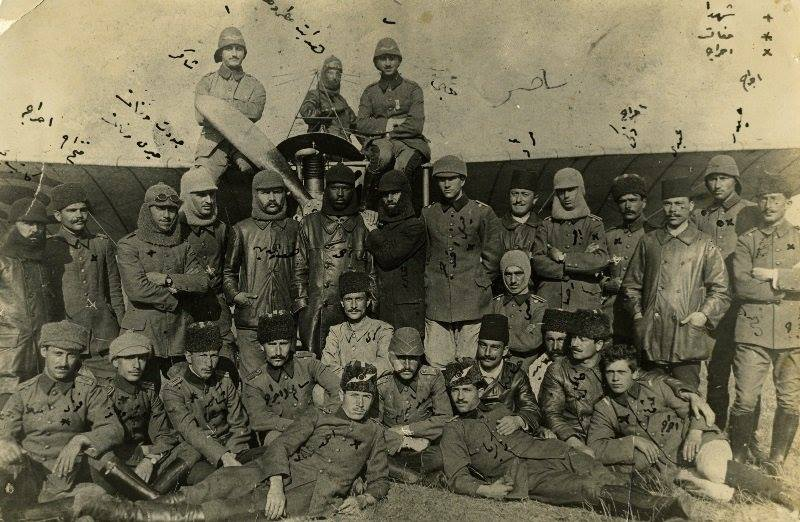
Ottoman pilots in 1914/1915 next to a Blériot XI-2 monoplane. Ahmet Ali Çelikten can be seen next to the propeller.

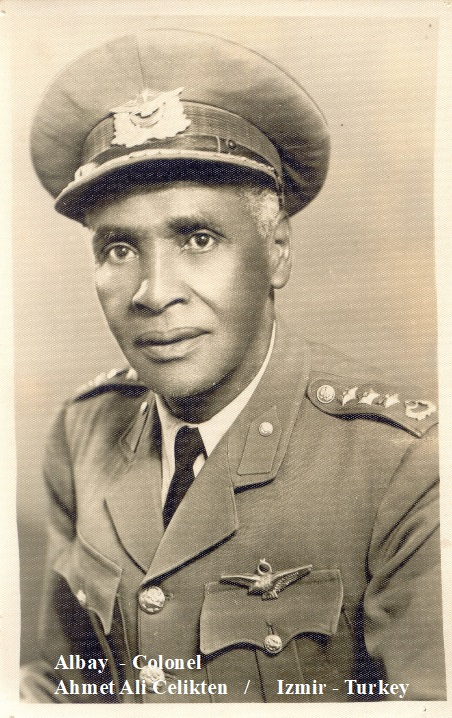
Ahmet Ali Çelikten during his time in the Turkish Navy.
