= Yvette Jarvis =

American-Greek basketball player and politician

Yvette M. Jarvis, a 1979 magna cum laude graduate of Boston University, moved to Greece in 1982 as an accomplished basketball player, to play for Panathinaikos. She became the first African American to play in the Greek Women's Basketball League, while also being the first salaried female athlete in the league.

She is the first African-American elected to public office in Greece in October 2002. An elected city councilwoman in Athens, Jarvis is a former professional athlete, model and actress.

Jarvis, is a strong supporter of human rights, those particularly of Greece's women, children, immigrants, and the disabled. Some of Jarvis' many political accomplishments include the establishment of a national toll-free hotline for victims of domestic violence in April 2003 and the development of a Greek Language program for Immigrant Mothers for the City of Athens. She was the coordinator for the "Obama for President - Greece" organization for US expats in Greece in 2008 and 2012. Chair of Democrats Abroad from 2010 to 2013 and a boardmember from 1992.

She is the lead singer and co-founder of the band SouLuv.

She is married to John Muller, and they have a son, John Jacob Muller.

Yvette and her family currently reside in Centennial, Colorado where she currently serves as Senior Program Director of the Extended Learning Program with Denver Public Schools.

== Sources ==
- Carson, Peter. (August 16, 2004). "American Aphrodite." Retrieved June 5, 2007.
- Carroll, Denolyn (March 2003). "You go! Yvette Jarvis - now! - African American woman elected to Athens, Greece city council - Brief Article". Essence. 33 (11). Archived from the original on June 28, 2006 – via FindArticles.
- "Yvette Jarvis: A Citizen of the World." (December, 2005). Boston University's Alumni e-Newsletter. Retrieved June 5, 2007.
- "Yvette Jarvis to join PASOK ticket for Athens municipal polls." (May 11, 2002). Athens News Agency. Retrieved June 5, 2007.
- "Yvette Jarvis' website in Greek." Retrieved June 5, 2007.
- "Yvette Jarvis' website in English." Retrieved June 5, 2007.
