= Fercani Şener =

Turkish footballer

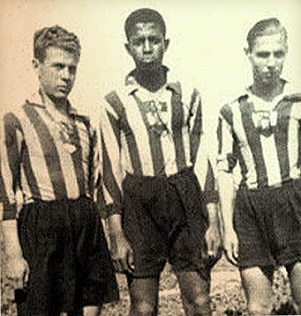

Senior career*
Years	Team	Apps	(Gls)
1921-22	Beşiktaş		
1924	Harbiye		
- * Club domestic league appearances and goals

Fercani Şener was a Turkish footballer, who played for the Beşiktaş and Harbiye football clubs in the 1920s. He was one of the first black players in Turkish football. In 1924, the Turkey national football team was preparing for the 1924 Summer Olympics and many footballers were called up for the squad, including Fercani Şener. However, Fercani Şener claimed that he was then removed from the squad because he was black; without him, Turkey was eliminated after its first match.
