= Black Greeks =

Ethnic group

Αφροέλληνες

Languages
- Greek

Religion
- predominantly Christianity; minority Islam

Related ethnic groups
- African Greeks

Black Greeks, also known as Afro-Greeks (Greek: Αφροέλληνες), are Black people who are citizens or residents of Greece.

== African immigrants in Modern Greece ==
Some families of African descent mainly from Sudan were brought to modern-day Greece by the Ottoman Turks, and still live in the village of Avato. They are now Sunni Muslims. Some of them lived before the population exchange between Greece and Turkey also on the island of Crete.

A number of African immigrants first arrived in Greece in 1997, though most came during the 2000s. The majority immigrated from Nigeria and Senegal; others came from the Congo, Ghana, Sudan, Tanzania, Zambia, Uganda, Kenya, Mauritius and Angola. The largest communities live in the Patissia and Kypseli districts of Athens.

The South African Embassy in Athens and the Consulate General of South Africa in Thessaloniki, maintains and develops relations between the South Africa and Greece. Embassy of Nigeria in Athens as well and Embassy of Greece in Abuja in Nigeria. Ugandan Consulate in Athens, Embassy of Sudan in Athens, Consulate of Ghana in Athens, Greek Embassy in Democratic Republic of Congo, Consulate General of Ethiopia in Athens, Embassy of Angola in Athens, Honorary Consulate of the Republic of Kenya in the Hellenic Republic.

According to the 2011 Census data from the National Statistical Service of Greece, the recent African arrivals to Greece include Guinean, Senegalese and Somalian males mostly under the age of 25. The older African immigrants are made up of Ethiopians, Nigerians, Ghanaians and Congolese.

== Notable individuals ==
=== Entertainment ===
- Jerome Kalouta - musician, actor
- Light (Christian Ioannidis) - rapper
- Isaias Matiaba – singer
- Stefanos Mwange - actor
- Marina Satti - singer, actress, musician
- Lianne La Havas - singer

=== Sport ===
- Alex Antetokounmpo – basketball player
- Giannis Antetokounmpo – NBA basketball player
- Kostas Antetokounmpo – NBA basketball player
- Thanasis Antetokounmpo – NBA basketball player
- Daniel Batista Lima – footballer
- Tyler Dorsey – American-Greek basketball player
- Konstadinos Douvalidis – hurdler
- Christopher Duberet – footballer
- Etinosa Erevbenagie – basketball player
- Kostas Ezomo – basketball player
- Yvette Jarvis – basketball player, model, actress
- Emmanouil Karalis – pole vaulter
- Nestoras Kommatos – basketball player
- Valentino Lazaro – Austrian footballer
- Markos Maragoudakis – footballer
- Nery Mantey Niangkouara – swimmer
- Alfa Ntiallo – basketball player
- Marios Ogkmpoe – football player
- Robyn Parks – basketball player
- Sofoklis Schortsanitis – basketball player
- Andrews Tetteh – football player
