= Worldometer =

Reference website for real-time statistics

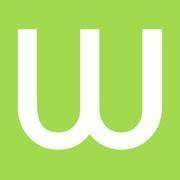

- Website type: Real-time statistics
- Founded: 2004; 22 years ago
- Country of origin: United States of America
- Founder: Andrey Alimetov
- Services: Statistics counters
- Parent: Dadax Limited
- Website: www.worldometers.info

Worldometer, formerly Worldometers, is a reference website that provides counters and real-time statistics for diverse topics. It is owned and operated by a data company named Dadax, which generates revenue through online advertising. It is available in 31 languages and covers subjects such as government, world population, economics, society, media, environment, food and water, energy, and health.

In early 2020, the website attained greater popularity due to hosting statistics relating to the COVID-19 pandemic.

== History ==
The website was founded by Andrey Alimetov, a Russian immigrant to the United States, in 2004. In 2011, it was voted as one of the best free reference websites by the American Library Association.

This site changed its name from "Worldometers" to "Worldometer" in January 2020 and announced that it would migrate to the singular domain name.

=== COVID-19 pandemic ===
In early 2020, the website gained popularity during the COVID-19 pandemic. It came under cyber attack in March 2020. The site was hit with a DDoS attack, and was then hacked a few days later, resulting in incorrect information being shown on its COVID-19 statistics page for approximately 20 minutes. The hacked site showed a dramatic rise in COVID-19 cases in Vatican City, which caused panic among some users of social media. The Spanish government used its figures to claim that it had carried out more tests than all but four other countries. Worldometers' COVID-19 figures have also been cited by Financial Times, The New York Times, The Washington Post, CNN, and Rede Globo.

Worldometer has faced some criticism over transparency of ownership, lack of citations to data sources, and unreliability of its COVID-19 statistics and live rankings.

In April 2020, editors of the English Wikipedia decided that Worldometer's COVID-19 figures are often unreliable and should not be cited in any pages related to the pandemic.

== Reception ==
Edouard Mathieu, the data manager of Our World in Data, stated that "Their main focus seems to be having the latest number [of COVID-19 cases] wherever it comes from, whether it's reliable or not, whether it's well-sourced or not."

Virginia Pitzer, a Yale University epidemiologist, said that the site is "legitimate", but flawed, inconsistent, and containing errors.

According to Axios, at the peak of user interest, the website was the #28 most visited website in the world in April 2020. A plurality (25.8%) of visitors came from the United States, followed by Japan (17.9%), India (8.67%), the United Kingdom (6.6%), South Korea (5.8%), Canada (5.18%), Germany (3.13%), Australia (2.49%), Poland (2.18%), France (1.73%), Turkey (1.66%), Brazil (1.65%) and Argentina (1.52%).

By March 2023, according to traffic data from Similarweb, Worldometer had dropped to the 5,963rd global place.
