= Saba Tümer =

Turkish TV presenter and journalist (born 1970)

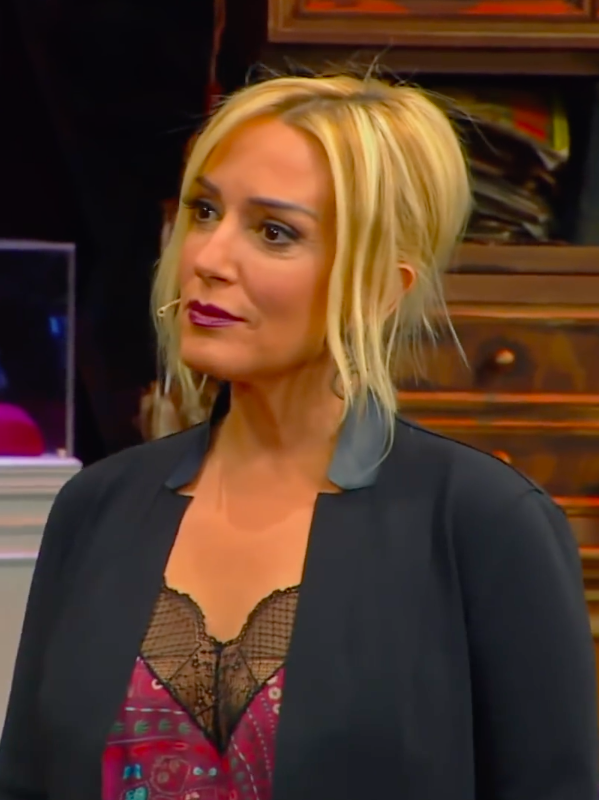
- Saba Tümer on the Tolgshow program in 2018
- Born: 5 December 1970 (age 55); Konak, İzmir, Turkey
- Education: Ege University
- Occupations: TV presenter; journalist
- Years active: 1996–present

Saba Tümer (born 5 December 1970) is a Turkish TV presenter and journalist.

== Education ==
She completed primary school in Gazi Primary School in Alsancak. After graduating from Private İzmir Fatih High School, she enrolled in the Journalism Department of Ege University School of Communication. After finishing school, she worked on Sky TV for 6 months and took diction lessons.

After working for Ege TV for six months, she read presented news on NTV for 4.5 years and wrote articles for the NStyle magazine for a while.

== Career ==
She transferred from NTV to Show TV and started to work as Show TV's foreign news presenter for a while, but later switched to SKYTURK and hosted the program Ne Var Ne Yok with Serdar Akinan, after which she returned to Show TV and started to present the program Saba Tümer ile Bu Gece. While presenting the night news on this channel for a while, she took part in the program called Haber Makinası at the request of Okan Bayülgen and presented the women's program called Lütfen Bu Konuya Girmeyelim on Star TV with columnist Pakize Suda. After Star TV canceled the program, she switched to Show TV again and started to present the morning program named Haberiniz Var mı? with Cem Özer. Tümer then went on hiatus for a year before returning to TV screens on 31 March 2008 on Habertürk TV with the program Saba Tümer İle Bu Gece. For a while, together with Ayşe Özyılmazel and her mother Oya Germen, she presented the program Yok Daha Neler but it did not last long. She then started working for CNN Türk with her new program, Saba Tümer ile Bu Gece, and a year later joined Show TV again. Tümer changed the format of her program from daily to only one night per week. On 12 September, she began presenting another program titled Saba Tümer'le Bugün and later began working for TV8 with the program Saba ile Oyuna Geldik, the Turkish version of Hollywood Game Night.

== Awards ==
- (2009) 36th Golden Butterfly Awards - Best Female TV Presenter
