= Mansur Ark =

Turkish singer (born 1965)

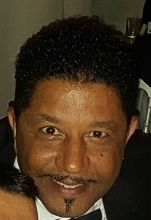
- Born: November 26, 1965 (age 60); Mersin, Turkey
- Occupation: Singer · songwriter · actor
- Years active: 1997–present

Mansur Ark (born November 26, 1965, Mersin, Turkey) is a Turkish singer-songwriter and actor. He sings songs in various genres, including Turkish pop, blues, R&B, and jazz.

== His life ==
He was born in Mersin in 1965. He is the fourth child of a mother from Mersin and a father of Libyan origin.

In 1996, he signed his first album contract with Bay Music. In November 1997, he released his first album, Mansur Ark, which bore his own name. He debuted with the song "Maalesef" and the song made a huge impact and became one of the hits of the period.

In 1999, he released his second studio album, Öğrendim. Although it did not make the same impact as the first album, it received positive reactions. His songs "Seni Seviyorum" and "Gel Yanıma" became popular.

In 2002, he released his third studio album, Fark. Although the album did not make as much noise as the first two albums, his duet with Ragga Oktay on the song "Yarim" made a splash.

In 2004, he released his fourth studio album, Gazla Gitsin. The song "Gazla Gitsin", which has the same name as the album, became one of the hits of the period. The song was getting a lot of requests to be played on the radio.

After releasing his fourth album, Ark took a five-year break from music and returned to music in 2009 with his fifth studio album called Sen de Bizdensin. The song "Sen de Bizdensin", which has the same name as the album, was very popular. It was played quite often on radio and television. In 2012, he released his sixth studio album Bu Defa. The album did not create much buzz, but in the same year, he sang his hit song "Sana Demedim mi?" again in the compilation album of 90s songs called Tam 90'dan released by Volga Tamöz.

== Early life ==
Mansur Ark was born in Mersin on November 26, 1965. His mother is from Mersin, his father is from Tripoli, Libya, and he has two older brothers and one older sister. He spent his entire childhood in the lodgings of the Ataş Petroleum Refinery where his father worked. His school life began in the kindergarten of the lodgings. He completed his primary education at Namık Kemal Primary School and his secondary education at Dumlupınar High School. He dropped out of the Electrical Department of Çukurova University Mersin Vocational School in the second grade. Mansur Ark has been involved in sailing since the age of 6 and has degrees. He did his military service in the Aegean Army in Narlıdere, İzmir in 1984. He got married for two years in 1987. He settled in Frankfurt, Germany in 1990 and then returned to Turkey.

In 1994, his interest in music increased thanks to his piano hobby. Before starting his music career, he worked as an animator at Robinson Club Pamfilya for three years. In 1996, he signed a record deal with Bay Music. In 1997, he released his first album with his own name and made a big breakthrough. He has songs in various genres such as blues, R&B, and jazz, mostly Turkish pop. The artist is married.

== Music career ==
=== 1997-2001: First albums, big success in the 90s ===
His interest in music increased in 1994. Mansur Ark, who wrote his own lyrics, was making songs in the style of blues, R&B and Jazz, mainly pop. He signed an album deal with Bay Music in 1996. After signing the deal, he started recording the songs he wrote lyrics for in the early months of 1997. After the recordings that lasted until the end of 1997, everything about the album was completed. The album was released on November 19, 1997. All the songs in the album were written and composed by Mansur Ark. He made his debut with the song "Maalesef". The video for the song made a big splash after it was broadcast on TV channels. It became one of the hits of the period and became one of the best songs of the 90s. Then he released his song "Sana Demedim Mi?" and this song was also highly appreciated. After this success, he made his voice heard all over Turkey. The album sales increased. The last song in the album was "Doyabilirsiniz". The song received positive reactions. The album consisted of 19 songs in total. Mansur Ark showed his own style with this album and brought a new trend to Turkish pop music. He gained great appreciation from the public with these songs he made by mixing different music. This album was mostly pop and R&B. The album became one of the best in Turkish music.

Öğrendim was released on November 22, 1999. It is Mansur Ark's second album. It was an album that was mostly pop and R&B like the first album. It debuted with the song "seni sevgi". It did not have the same effect as the first album, but it still received positive reactions. Unlike the debut song, the song "Gel Yanıma" stood out. Another prominent song was the song "Yemin". Although it was not a debut like the first album, there were still songs that were appreciated by the public. The album consisted of a total of 14 songs and the lyrics and music of all the songs in the album belonged to Mansur Ark. The recordings of the album, which started in late 1998, continued until mid-1999. It was completed in mid-1999. Mansur Ark shot music videos for two songs in the album.

=== 2002–2004: New albums and TV-series soundtrack ===
On May 30, 2002, he released his third studio album, Fark, with the MOD Music label. The album did not make as much noise as his first two albums, but his duet with Ragga Oktay on the song "Yarim" was very popular and helped the album gain traction. The album had a total of 10 songs, and the lyrics and music of all the songs in the album belonged to Mansur Ark, just like the first two albums. The album consisted mostly of Pop, R&B and Hip Hop genres. He did not release the album with the Esen Music label. He signed an agreement with MOD Music and released his third album. After this album, he started preparations for his fourth studio album.

On June 11, 2004, he released his fourth studio album, Gazla Gitsin, with the Seyhan Music label. The album consisted of a total of 10 songs, as in every album. He shot clips for two songs in the album. One was a slow song called "Silinmez" and the other was the song with the same name as the album, "Gazla Gitsin". The song made a big splash and became one of the hits of the period. It became one of the most played songs of the summer of 2004. For the album, Mansur Ark changed his style and made his hair long and afro-style. He made a splash that his third album, released after his first two albums, did not bring and strengthened his position. In 2004, he made the music for the series Dayı, which was broadcast on Kanal D. After this album, he took a five-year break from music.

=== 2009–2012: Return to Music and projects ===
In June 2009, he returned to music after a five-year break with a new album. He made a good comeback with his fifth studio album called Sen de Bizdensin. The recordings of the album, which started in late 2008, continued until 2009 and was released in June. The album, which has the same name as the album, "Sen de Bizdensin", was a great success and was frequently played on radio and television. Mansur Ark returned to his old success with the song, which became one of the hits of the period. There are eight songs in the album and all of them belong to Ark. He made a duet with the rap artist BRB in the song "İstiyorsan Git" in the album. The album mostly had lively songs in the Pop, R&B and Hip-Hop genres.

In 2012, he released his sixth studio album Bu Defa. There were four songs in the album and all of them belong to Mansur Ark. He shot a video for the song Senin Kokun Ayrı in the album. The album did not create a stir. In the same year, in 2012, he sang the song "Sana Demedim Mi?" from his first album in Volga Tamöz's project album called Tam 90'dan, which compiled the hit songs of the 90s, and performed at the Kral Türkiye Music Awards ceremony.

== Acting career ==
He first appeared as a guest actor in the phenomenal series Ruhsar, which was broadcast on Kanal D in 1998. Then, in 1999, he played the leading role in the series İç Güveyi Billy, which was broadcast on TGRT. In 2002, he played the character "Zambo" in the series Ladies and Gentlemen, which was broadcast on Kanal D. In 2003, he played a guest role in the series Sultan Makamı on the same channel. In 2010, he played the character "Kızlar Ağası Mustafa Ağa" in his first movie, Mahpeyker Kösem Sultan. In 2012, he played himself in the series İşler Güçler, which was broadcast on Star TV. Then, he played a Jamaican judge in the film Mc Dandik, directed by his close friend Ragga Oktay. He played the leading role in the series İthal Gelin, which was broadcast on the Turkish television channel Türkshow in Germany.

== Filmography ==
Movies
Year	Production	Role	Notes
2010	Mahpeyker Kösem Sultan	Kızlar Ağası Mustafa Ağa	First feature film
2013	Mc Dandik	Jamaican Judge	His first leading role.
2016	Baba Mirası	Doctor Cesur	

Soap Opera
Year	Production	Role	Notes
1998	Ruhsar	Guest actor	First TV-series
1999	İç Güveyi Billy	Billy	
2002	Ladies and Gentlemen	Zambo	
2003	Sultan Makamı	Guest actor	
2012	İşler Güçler	Himself	
2021	Acans	Himself	

== Albums ==
- Mansur Ark (1997)
- Öğrendim (1999)
- Fark (2002)
- Gazla Gitsin (2004)
- Sen de Bizdensin (2009)
- Bu Defa (2012)
