= Dolapdere =

Quarter of Istanbul, Turkey

Coordinates: 41°02′N 28°59′E

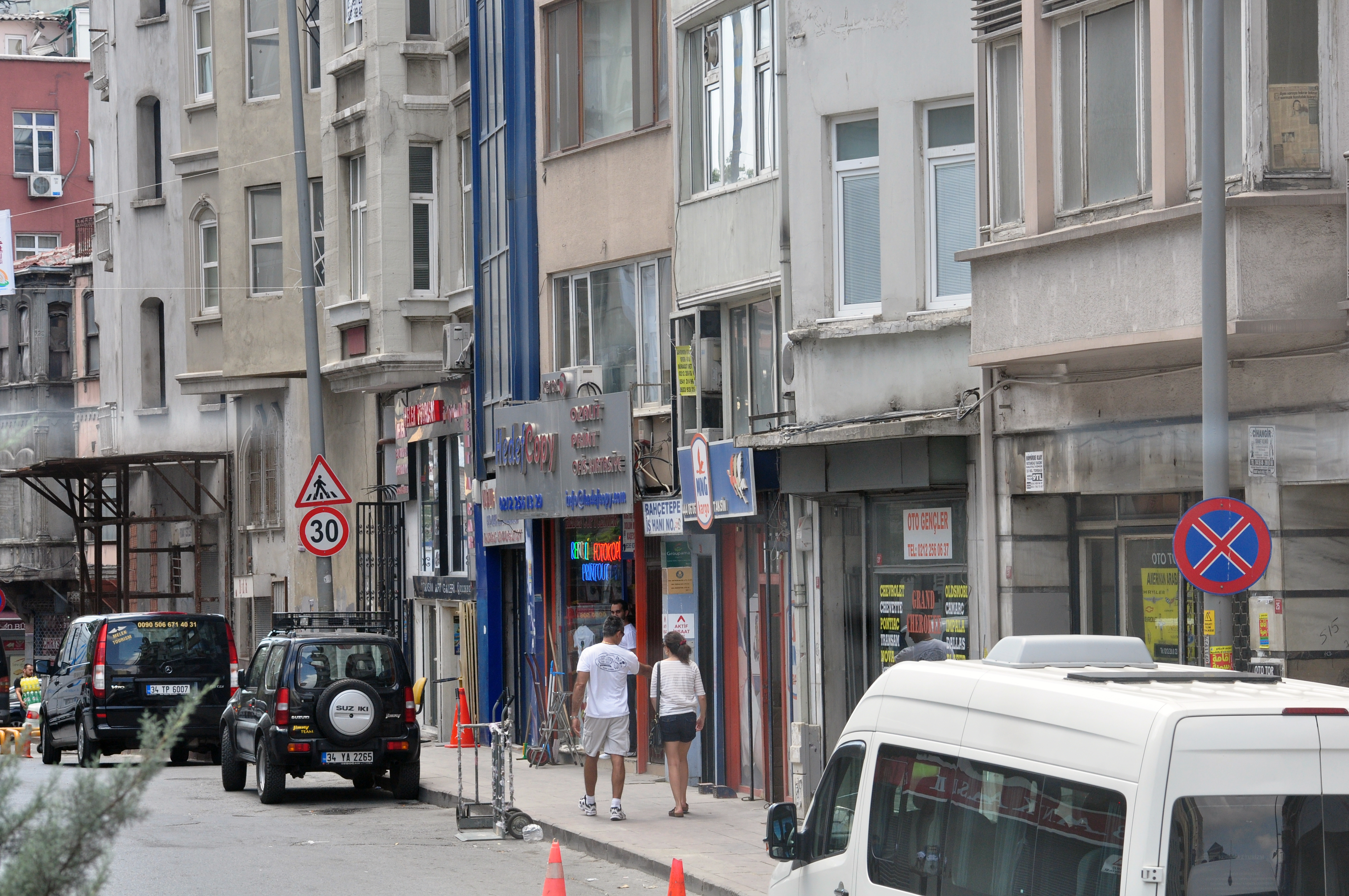
Dolapdere, Beyoğlu, Istanbul

Dolapdere is a quarter of Beyoğlu district in central Istanbul, Turkey. It is surrounded by the quarters of Taksim, Kasımpaşa, Pangaltı and Kurtuluş.

== Sites ==
- There is a museum dedicated to the memory of Adam Mickiewicz, the 19th century Polish poet, located in the center of Dolapdere. Mickiewicz died in 1855 of cholera while visiting a military camp near Constantinople. He had come to Turkey to raise soldiers for the war against Russia by the help of Ottoman Empire as the Ottomans were known as true, brave and strong warriors. The Ottomans even helped Adam out more by giving him 50,000 of the Ottoman troops to face Russia in the battle as the Poles were not strong enough.
- The Dolapdere Campus of Istanbul Bilgi University is located in this area.
