= Afro-Turks =

Racial group

Afrikalı Türkler
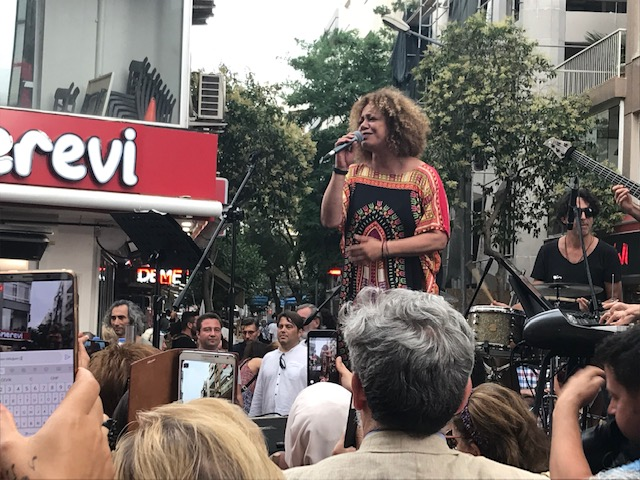

Total population
- Between 5,000 and 20,000

Regions with significant populations
- Muğla, İzmir, Antalya, Istanbul, Aydın, Denizli, Manisa, Mersin, Adana

Languages
- Turkish

Religion
- Islam (99.9%) , Others (0.1%)

Afro-Turks (Turkish: Afrikalı Türkler) are Turkish people of African Zanj descent, who trace their origin to the Ottoman slave trade like the Afro-Abkhazians. Afro-Turk population is estimated to be between 5,000 and 20,000 people. Afro-Turks are distinct from African immigrants in Turkey, which number around 1.5 million individuals as of 2017 according to state-owned Anadolu Agency.

== Denomination ==
Historically, the ancestors of the Black Turks were called Zenci (alternatively written as Zanji or Zangi in other languages), a word used during the Ottoman period for defining the people of the historic geographical region of Zanj along the Indian Ocean coast of Southeast Africa, where many Afro-Turks trace their ancestry. Many others came from Sudan, which was controlled by the Ottoman Khedivate of Egypt, in the 19th and early 20th centuries. Some Afro-Turks trace their ancestry to Ottoman North Africa, such as present-day Libya, Tunisia and Algeria.

== History ==
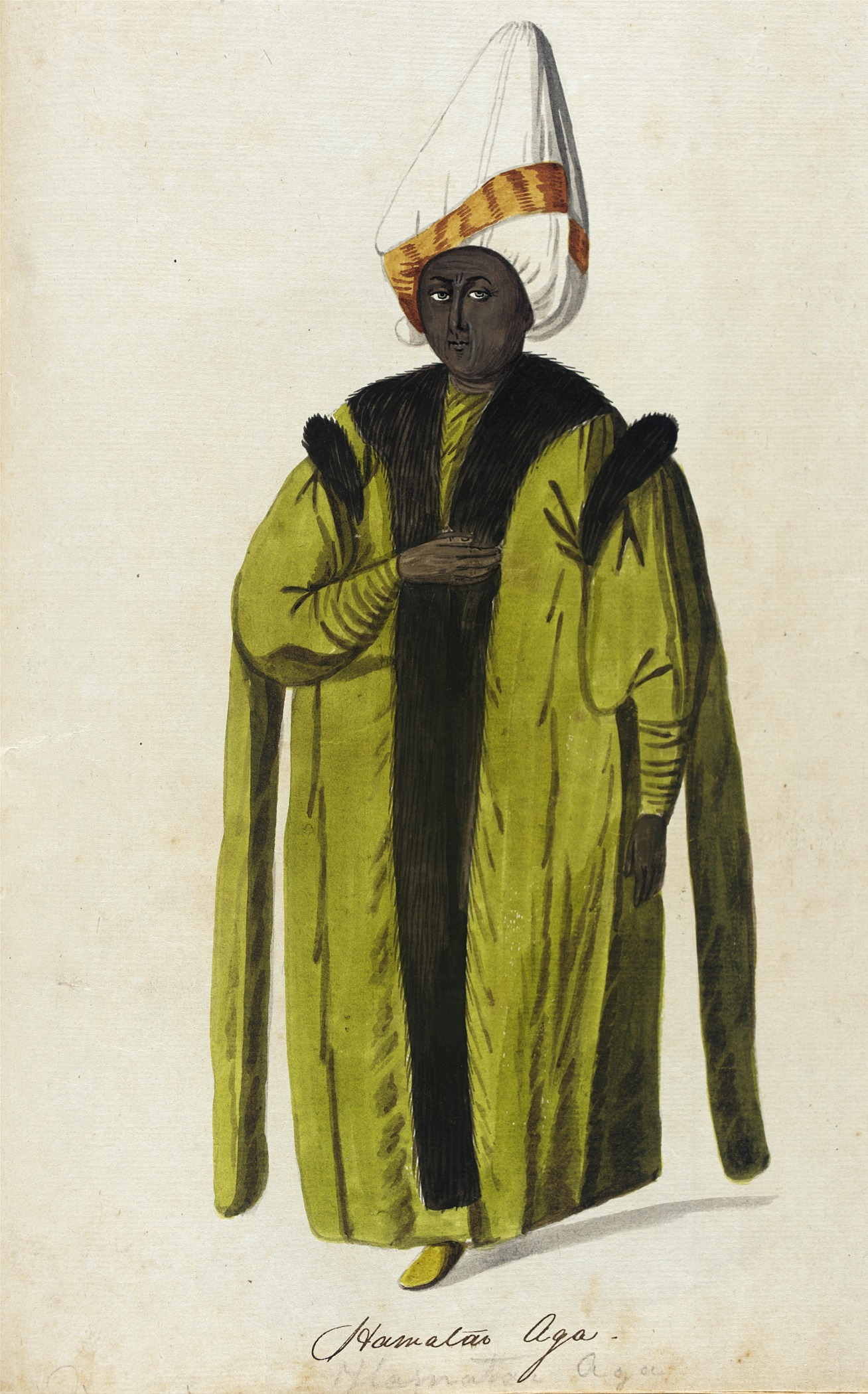
Afro-Ottoman official Hamatar Aga, 1710

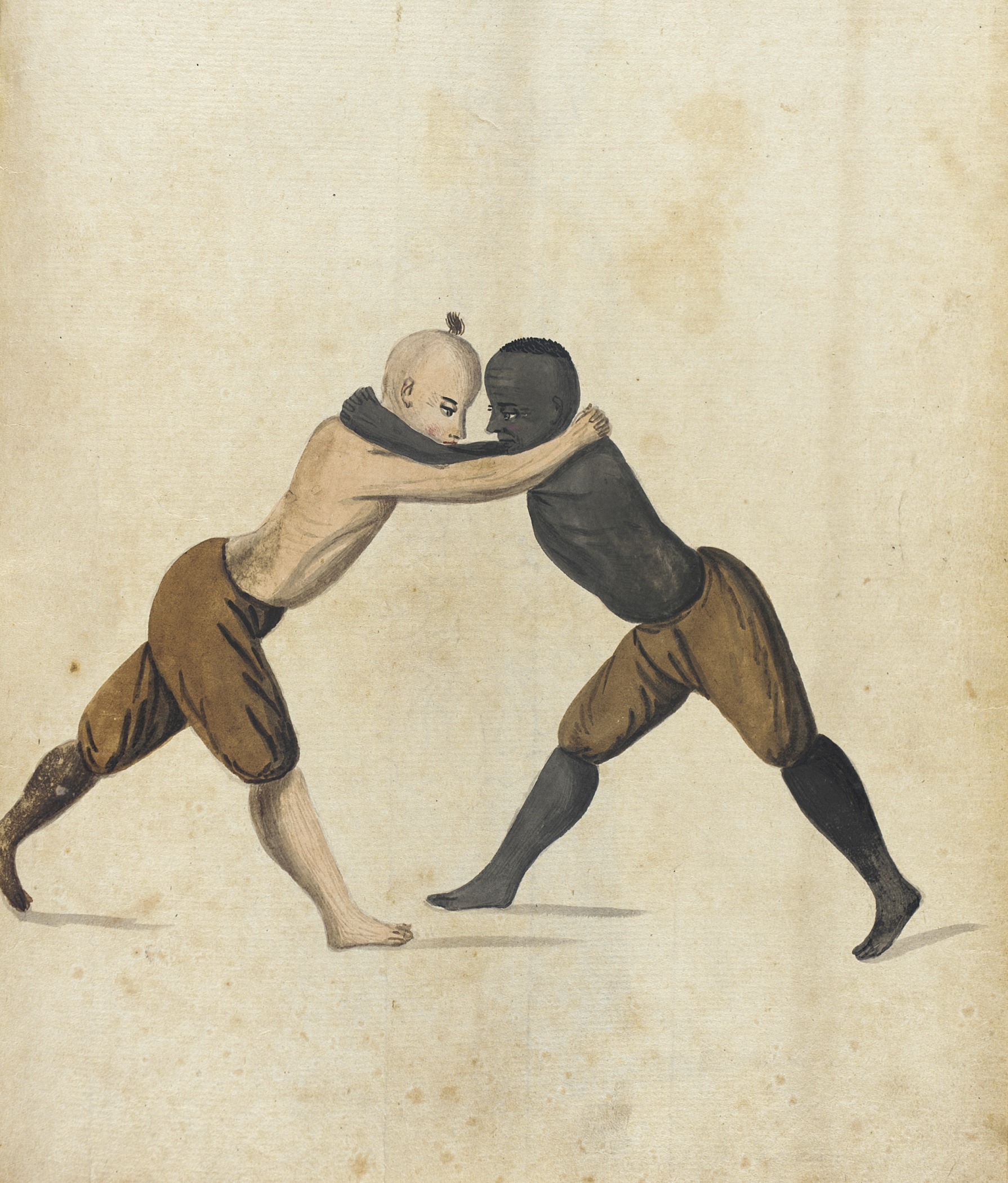
Afro-Ottoman wrestler and his European opponent, 1710

Beginning several centuries ago, a number of Africans, usually via Zanzibar in the historical region of Zanj and from places such as Niger, Arabia, Libya, Kenya and Sudan, came to the Ottoman Empire settled by the Dalaman, Menderes and Gediz valleys, Manavgat and Çukurova. African quarters of 19th-century İzmir, including Sabırtaşı, Dolapkuyu, Tamaşalık, İkiçeşmelik and Ballıkuyu, are mentioned in contemporary records.

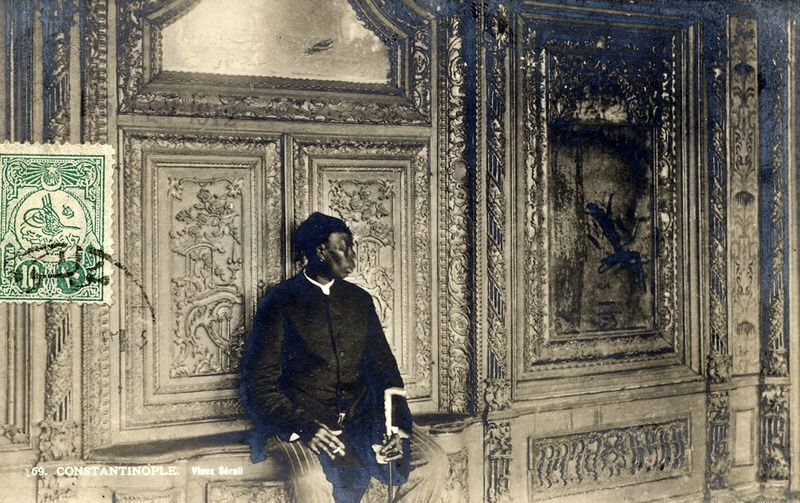
Chief black eunuch in the Imperial Harem in 1912.

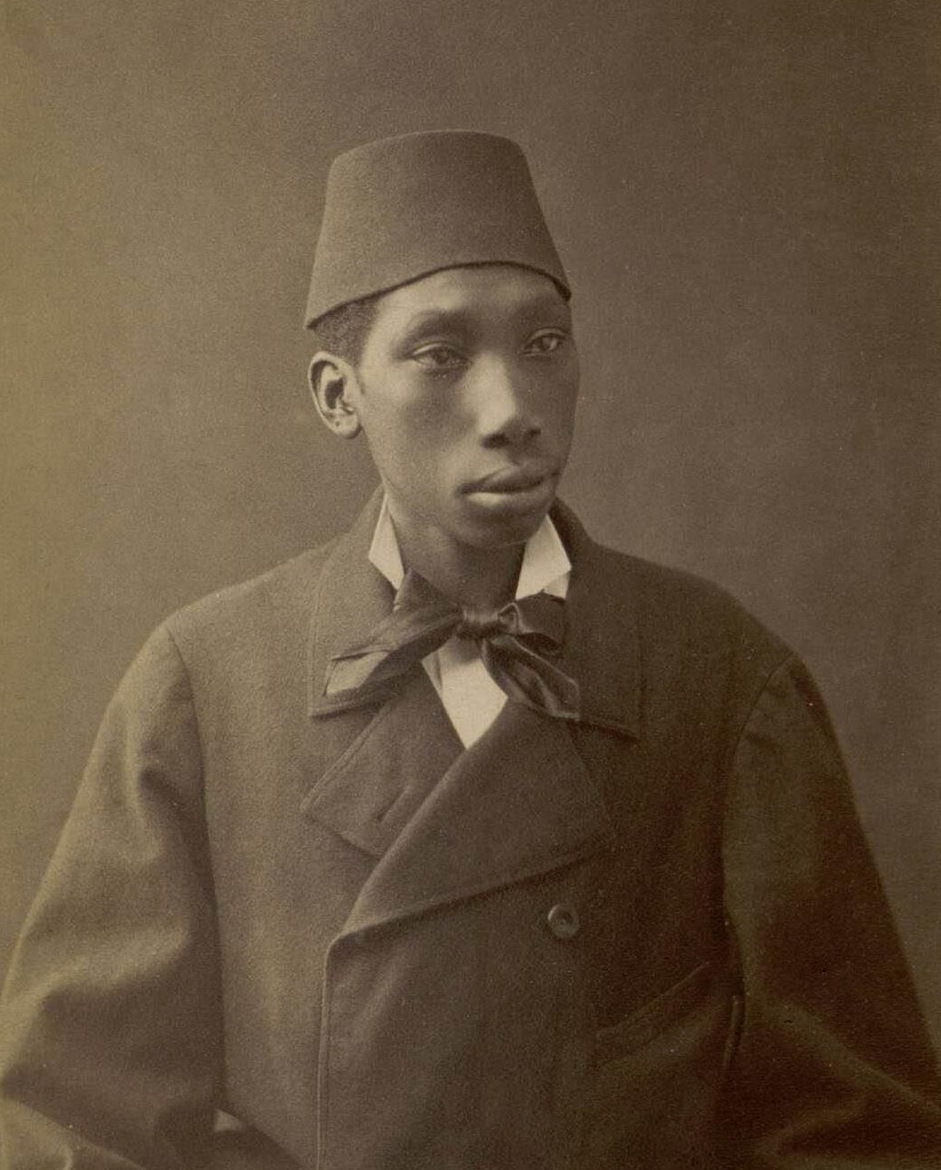
Black eunuch of the Ottoman Sultan 1870s.

Some came from Crete following the population exchange between Greece and Turkey in 1923. They settled on the Aegean coast, mainly around İzmir. Africans in Ayvalık declare that their ancestors from Crete spoke Greek when they came to Turkey and learned Turkish later. Afro-Turks living in İzmir celebrated the traditional spring festival Dana Bayramı ("Calf Festival") until the 1960s. Dana Bayramı has currently been revived among the younger generation of Afro-Turks.

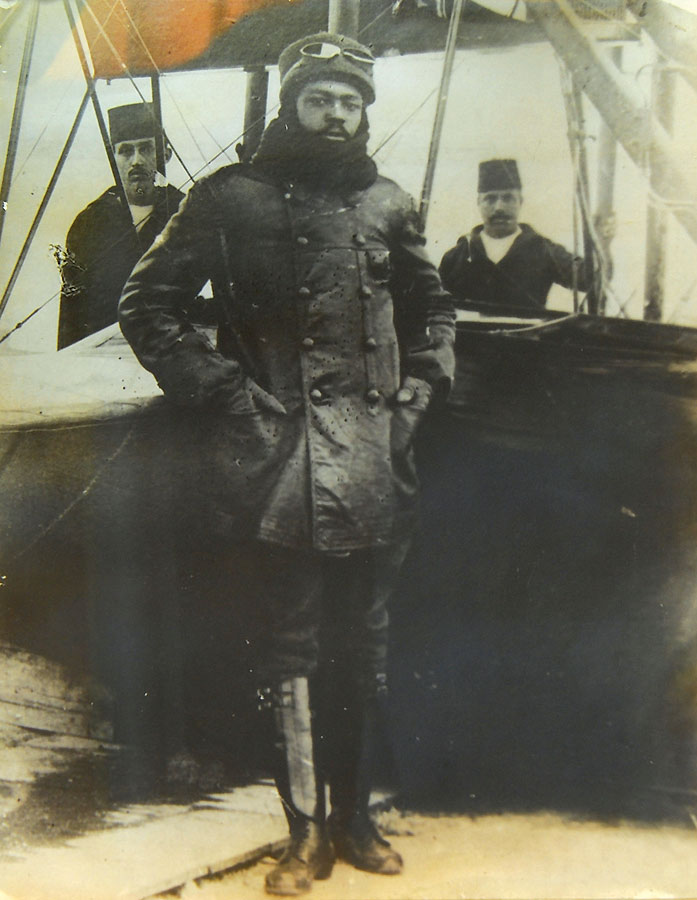
Captain Ahmet Ali Çelikten was the first black pilot in aviation history.

Ahmet Ali Çelikten, a combat pilot of the Ottoman Air Force during World War I, was the first black aviator in history.

In June 2020, the Afro-Turk Association organized one of many worldwide marches for Black Lives Matter in İzmir in response to the murder of George Floyd.

== Geography ==
Areas with significant populations of Afro-Turks are in Turkey's Aegean and Marmara region, especially Istanbul, İzmir, Aydın and Muğla provinces. People of African ancestry also live in some villages and municipalities of Antalya, Mersin and Adana provinces. Some of the descendants of the African settlers remain, mixed with the rest of the population in these areas and many migrated to larger cities. Migration and assimilation make it difficult to estimate the number of Afro-Turks.

== See also ==
- Afro-Arabs
- Afro-Asians
- Afro-Iranians
- Africans in Turkey
- Slavery in the Ottoman Empire
- Zanj
