= Su canción =

1979 song by Betty Missiego

Single by Betty Missiego

from the album Su canción
- Language: Spanish
- B-side: "Contrastes"
- Released: 1979
- Length: 2:59
- Label: Mercury
- Songwriter: Fernando Moreno

Music video
- "Su canción" on YouTube

Eurovision Song Contest 1979 entry
- Country: Spain
- Artist: Betty Missiego
- Language: Spanish
- Composer: Fernando Moreno
- Lyricist: Fernando Moreno
- Conductor: José Luis Navarro

Finals performance
- Final result: 2nd
- Final points: 116

Entry chronology
- ◄ "Bailemos un vals" (1978)
- "Quédate esta noche" (1980) ►

"Su canción" (Spanish pronunciation: [su kanˈθjon]; "Your Song") is a song recorded by Peruvian-Spanish singer Betty Missiego, written by Fernando Moreno. It represented Spain in the Eurovision Song Contest 1979, held in Jerusalem where it placed second.

Missiego recorded "Su canción" in four different languages, besides Spanish also French, Italian, and German.

== Background ==
=== Conception ===
"Su canción", written by Fernando Moreno, is performed from the point of view of una mujer mayor ("a grown-up woman", ostensibly Missiego), who lived a solitary life until she found joy in the world around her through children who asked her to sing a song with them. At the end, she implores everyone to sing along with her, so the song can become "theirs" as well. Betty Missiego, was a 34-year-old Peruvian singer and television presenter who had previous song contest experience representing Peru at the OTI Festival 1972 in Madrid.

=== Eurovision ===
Televisión Española (TVE) internally selected the song as its entrant for the 24th edition of the Eurovision Song Contest. Missiego recorded it in four different languages, besides Spanish also French –as "Dès qu'un enfant chante"–, Italian –as "Vola l'amore"–, and German –as "Der mann im mond"–.

On 31 March 1979, the Eurovision Song Contest was held at the International Convention Center in Jerusalem hosted by the Israeli Broadcasting Authority (IBA), and broadcast live throughout the continent. Missiego performed "Su canción" nineteenth that evening closing the competition, after Austria's "Heute in Jerusalem" by Christina Simon. Unique that year was her use of four children –Javier Glaria, Alexis Carmona, Beatriz Carmona, and Rosalía Rodríguez– as backup singers of sorts, joining her in "her song". At the end of the song, they unfurl small banners, with "thanks" inscribed on each in English, Spanish, Hebrew and French, respectively. José Luis Navarro conducted the event's live orchestra in the performance of the Spanish entry.

At the end of that evening, "Su canción" placed second with 116 points. Spain was given 12 points (the maximum score allotted to one country by another) by Italy, Switzerland, Germany and Belgium. As Spain was the last country to perform, it was also the last to vote. Before its points were awarded to the other countries, it had led the scoreboard by one point. When Spain itself awarded Israel and its song "Hallelujah" 10 points, it lost its first place and granted the host country the win.

=== Aftermath ===
"Su canción", ending in second place, was the best showing for a Eurovision entry Spain had seen since 1973, in which the country also placed second. It would be the best placing for Spain in the Contest until 1995, when they would place second again. The second place and 116 points is the same placing as Spain had in 1971 with the song "En un mundo nuevo", which also took second place with 116 points.

As a result of the high placing, it is remembered as one of the more notable moments for Spain in the Contest, so much so that both Missiego and songwriter Moreno have been involved in events with OGAE, the official Eurovision fan club. In 2006, Missiego was a guest of honor at a Spanish OGAE meeting, alongside Massiel, winner of the Contest for Spain in 1968, and Conchita Bautista, who sang the first Spanish entry at Eurovision in 1961.

"Su canción" was succeeded as the Spanish entry at the 1980 contest by Trigo Limpio with "Quédate esta noche".
