= Je suis l'enfant soleil =

French entry in the Eurovision Song Contest 1979

Single by Anne-Marie David
- B-side: "Just Like Loving You"
- Released: 1979
- Genre: Chanson
- Length: 3:00
- Label: Polydor
- Composer: Hubert Giraud
- Lyricist: Eddy Marnay

Anne-Marie David singles chronology
"Neşeli Gençleriz" (1976)	"Je suis l'enfant soleil" (1979)	"Trop" (1979)

Eurovision Song Contest 1979 entry
- Country: France
- Artist: Anne-Marie David
- Language: French
- Conductor: Guy Mattéoni

Finals performance
- Final result: 3rd
- Final points: 106

Entry chronology
- ◄ "Il y aura toujours des violons" (1978)
- "Hé, hé M'sieurs dames" (1980) ►

"Je suis l'enfant soleil" (French pronunciation: [ʒə sɥi lɑ̃fɑ̃ sɔlɛj]; translated: "I am the sun-child" or "I'm a child of the sun") was the French entry in the Eurovision Song Contest 1979, performed in French by Anne-Marie David. David had won Eurovision six years earlier, representing Luxembourg at the 1973 contest with "Tu te reconnaîtras".

The song was written by Eddy Marnay, and composed by Hubert Giraud, both Eurovision veterans; Marnay previously wrote "Un jour, un enfant", a winner of the 1969 contest, as well as "Je suis tombé du ciel" for the 1970 contest, which placed last; Giraud wrote "Dors, mon amour", which won the 1958 contest, as well as compose the entries of France in 1959 and 1967, Monaco in 1960 and 1961, and Luxembourg in 1971.

David also recorded the song in German and Italian, as "Sonnenkind" and "Ragazza sole" respectively.

== Composition ==
The song is a dramatic chanson ballad, with David describing a youthful love affair with a stranger. The stranger is welcomed by the narrator's father and given lodging and work. Passion develops between the two: "every burning hot winter our love made the earth tremble", but one day men come for the stranger. "He tried to escape but it was too late, the trap was already closing around him" and he is taken away "with his hands above his head". The song ends with the protagonist calling for her lover's return.

== At the Eurovision Song Contest ==
The song was performed eleventh on the night, following Israel's Milk and Honey with "Hallelujah" and preceding Belgium's Micha Marah with "Hey Nana". At the close of voting, it had received 106 points, coming third in a field of nineteen.

It was succeeded as French representative at the 1980 contest by Profil with "Hé, hé M'sieurs dames".

== Critical reception ==
Critics' reviews of the song varied. The Reading Evening Post's Albert Watson wrote the song was "quite beautiful" and a favourite to win the contest. Concurringly, Der Bund's television critic praised the song for offering the contest a true chanson. In contrast, Russell Kyle of the Evening Times called it an "abysmal [commercial] failure", labelling the single "rubbish".

== Charts ==
The single sold over 100,000 copies in France.

Chart performance for "Je suis l'enfant soleil"
Chart (1979)	Peak position
France (IFOP)	51
France (Hit-parade RTL)	32
France (Hit-parade RMC)	48
