= Greece in the Eurovision Song Contest 1979 =

- Eurovision Song Contest 1979
- Participating broadcaster: Hellenic Broadcasting Corporation (ERT)
- Country: Greece
- Selection process: National final
- Selection date: 5 February 1979

Competing entry
- Song: "Socrates"
- Artist: Elpida
- Songwriters: Doros Georgiadis; Sotia Tsotou

Placement
- Final result: 8th, 69 points

Participation chronology

Greece was represented at the Eurovision Song Contest 1979 with the song "Socrates", composed by Doros Georgiadis, with lyrics by Sotia Tsotou, and performed by Elpida. The Greek participating broadcaster, the Hellenic Broadcasting Corporation (ERT), held a national final to select its entry.

== Before Eurovision ==
=== National final ===
The Hellenic Broadcasting Corporation (ERT) held the national final on 5 February 1979 at the Municipal Theater in Piraeus, hosted by Vasilis Tsivilikas. The winning song was chosen by a jury of 65 people who awarded each song a mark out of 10.

Final – 5 February 1979
R/O	Artist	Song	Points	Place
1	Kostas Hatzis	"Na'han oli i anthropi mia agapi opos ki ego"	379	3
2	Bessy Argyraki	"Athena (mana mou)"	322	5
3	Sofia Zaninou	"Stin arhi"	271	6
4	Christie Stasinopoulou	"Dose mou enan sticho"	462	2
5	Elpida	"Sokrati"	528	1
6	Paola Komini, Maria Filosofou, Fotini Filosofou, Dimitris Kontoyiannis, and Stefanos Dekerian	"Dio se mia ombrella"	349	4

== At Eurovision ==
"Sokrati" was re-titled "Socrates" for Eurovision, and was performed seventh on the evening (following Monaco's "Notre vie c'est la musique" by Laurent Vaguener and preceding Switzerland's "Trödler Und Co" by Peter, Sue and Marc and Pfuri, Gorps & Kniri). At the close of voting, it had received 69 points, placing 8th in a field of 19.

Elpida was accompanied on stage by Lia Vissi (who will later represent Cyprus in 1985), Polina (who was to represent Greece in 1986, but Greece withdrew), Yiannis Samsiaris and Stelios Goulielmos, all four of them being backing vocalists.

=== Voting ===
Points awarded to Greece
Score	Country
12 points	
10 points	Israel; Portugal
8 points	
7 points	Monaco; Netherlands; Spain; Switzerland
6 points	
5 points	Luxembourg
4 points	France; Ireland
3 points	
2 points	Austria; Germany; Sweden
1 point	Belgium; Denmark

Points awarded by Greece
Score	Country
12 points	Denmark
10 points	Ireland
8 points	France
7 points	Finland
6 points	Spain
5 points	Luxembourg
4 points	Israel
3 points	Netherlands
2 points	Switzerland
1 point	Sweden
