= Colorado (Xandra song) =

1979 song by Xandra

Single by Xandra
- Language: Dutch
- Released: 1979
- Composer: Rob Bolland
- Lyricists: Ferdi Bolland; Gerard Cox

Eurovision Song Contest 1979 entry
- Country: Netherlands
- Artist: Sandra Reemer
- As: Xandra
- Language: Dutch
- Composer: Rob Bolland
- Lyricists: Ferdi Bolland; Gerard Cox
- Conductor: Harry van Hoof

Finals performance
- Final result: 12th
- Final points: 51

Entry chronology
- ◄ "'t Is OK" (1978)
- "Amsterdam" (1980) ►

"Colorado" is a song performed by the six-piece group Xandra, fronted by Sandra Reemer. It represented the Netherlands in the Eurovision Song Contest 1979.

This was Reemer's third Eurovision entry; in 1972 she had finished 4th with "Als het om de liefde gaat", as part of the duo Sandra & Andres, and in 1976 9th with "The Party's Over", then as a solo artist.

"Colorado" was written by brothers Rob & Ferdi Bolland and Gerard Cox. Internationally Bolland & Bolland are arguably best known for writing and recording the original version of Status Quo's 1986 hit "In the Army Now" (#1 Austria & Switzerland, #2 UK, France & Norway, #6 Sweden, #15 The Netherlands).

Xandra recorded the song in three languages: the original Dutch, English and German – all with the same title.

The song was performed fourteenth on the night, following Luxembourg's Jeane Manson with "J'ai déjà vu ça dans tes yeux" and preceding Sweden's Ted Gärdestad with "Satellit". At the close of voting, it had received 51 points, placing 12th in a field of 19.

Despite its moderate success in the Contest, "Colorado" was one of four entries to become a Top 10 hit in Sweden in 1979, the three others being the Swedish "Satellit", the Israeli winner "Hallelujah" and Germany's "Dschinghis Khan". The English version of "Colorado" peaked at #9 and spent a total of 10 weeks on the Swedish singles chart. Furthermore, "Colorado" was covered in Swedish by singer Barbro 'Lill-Babs' Svensson, who previously had represented Sweden at the 1961 contest with "April, april", and Svensson's recording of the song was also a minor hit on the Svensktoppen radio chart in June 1979.

"Colorado" was succeeded as Dutch representative at the 1980 contest by Maggie MacNeal with "Amsterdam".
