= Netherlands in the Eurovision Song Contest 1979 =

- Eurovision Song Contest 1979
- Participating broadcaster: Nederlandse Omroep Stichting (NOS)
- Country: Netherlands
- Selection process: Artist: Internal selection Song: Nationaal Songfestival 1979
- Selection date: 7 February 1979

Competing entry
- Song: "Colorado"
- Artist: Xandra
- Songwriters: Rob Bolland; Ferdi Bolland; Gerard Cox

Placement
- Final result: 12th, 51 points

Participation chronology

The Netherlands was represented at the Eurovision Song Contest 1979 with the song "Colorado", composed by Rob Bolland and Ferdi Bolland, with lyrics by Gerard Cox, and performed by Xandra. The Dutch participating broadcaster, Nederlandse Omroep Stichting (NOS), selected its entry through a national final, after having previously selected the performer internally. Originally, Rob de Nijs was selected, but was replaced by Xandra as some NOS executives reportedly felt that "no man who had posed unshaven for the cover of his new single could be sent [to the Contest] and that it would be better to send an attractive girl [instead]."

Although it was claimed at the time that Xandra was the name of a six-piece band, in reality it was merely a name adopted by Eurovision veteran Sandra Reemer, who had previously represented the Netherlands in 1972 and 1976. The cover sleeves on the various domestic and international record issues of "Colorado" for example all pictured Reemer on her own without any "band members".

== Before Eurovision ==
=== Nationaal Songfestival 1979 ===
The final was held at the RAI Congrescentrum in Amsterdam, hosted by Martine Bijl. Five songs took part, all performed by Xandra, with the winner being decided by eleven juries who each had 50 points to distribute between the songs. Ten of the juries consisted of people from various professions (politicians, musical conductors, carnival workers, nurses, chefs, local mayors, media presenters, actors, footballers, and firefighters) while the eleventh was made up of members of the Sandra Reemer fan club.

Final – 7 February 1979
R/O	Song	Points	Place
1	"Lieveling"	109	2
2	"Lila Lavendel"	66	5
3	"Intercity"	104	3
4	"Waar ben je heen"	68	4
5	"Colorado"	203	1

== At Eurovision ==
On the night of the final Xandra performed 14th in the running order, following Luxembourg and preceding Sweden. At the close of voting, "Colorado" had received 51 points from 10 countries, placing the Netherlands 12th of the 19 entries. The Dutch jury awarded its 12 points to France.

The Dutch conductor at the contest was Harry van Hoof.

=== Voting ===
Points awarded to the Netherlands
Score	Country
12 points	
10 points	Ireland
8 points	Denmark
7 points	Israel
6 points	
5 points	Finland
4 points	Austria; Norway; Sweden
3 points	Belgium; Germany; Greece
2 points	
1 point	

Points awarded by the Netherlands
Score	Country
12 points	France
10 points	Spain
8 points	Denmark
7 points	Greece
6 points	Norway
5 points	United Kingdom
4 points	Luxembourg
3 points	Portugal
2 points	Germany
1 point	Israel
