= Orlando Riva Sound =

German Euro disco group

- Origin: Germany
- Genres: Euro disco
- Years active: 1977–1981
- Past members: Anthony Monn; Rainer Pietsch; Sophia Reaney

Orlando Riva Sound (commonly abbreviated as O.R.S.) was a German Euro disco group founded in 1977 by Anthony Monn and Rainer Pietsch.

Their first success was in 1977 with the song "Moon Boots", a mostly instrumental piece. Soon after the group's founding, they added Sophia Reaney as a singer/dancer. The following year, they released "Body to Body Boogie", which was more downtempo compared to "Moon Boots". The song also spawned the album of the same name with the following songs: "Disco Mussorgsky," "Sweet Release" and "Dream Machine", plus the 12" version of "Moon Boots".

In 1979, the group ended fifth place in the competition to represent Germany in the Eurovision Song Contest with "Lady, Lady, Lady". That year, they also had another hit with the song "Indian Reservation", a cover of the hit by Paul Revere & the Raiders. The following year, they had yet another hit with "Fire on the Water". Their final success came in 1981 with "O.T.T. (Over The Top)", after which the band broke up.Songs

- "Verde"
- "Moon Boots"
- "Body to Body Boogie"
- "Lady, Lady, Lady"
- "Indian Reservation"
- "We're Not Alone"
- "Fire on the Water"
- "The Blaze"
- "O.T.T. (Over The Top)"
- "Who Built The Pyramids?"
