= Katson sineen taivaan =

1979 single by Katri Helena

Single by Katri Helena

from the album Katson sineen taivaan
- B-side: Kevät
- Released: 1979
- Length: 2:53
- Label: Scandia
- Composer: Matti Siitonen
- Lyricist: Vexi Salmi

Katri Helena singles chronology
| "Voitko Rakastaa (All We Need Is Love)" (1978) | "Katson sineen taivaan" (1979) | "Katson autiota hiekkarantaa" (1979) |

Eurovision Song Contest 1979 entry
- Country: Finland
- Artist: Katri Helena
- Language: Finnish
- Conductor: Ossi Runne

Finals performance
- Final result: 14th
- Final points: 38

Entry chronology
- ◄ "Anna rakkaudelle tilaisuus" (1978)
- "Huilumies" (1980) ►

"Katson sineen taivaan" ("I'm looking at the blue sky") was the Finnish entry in the Eurovision Song Contest 1979, performed in Finnish by Katri Helena. The song was written by Vexi Salmi, and composed by Matti Siitonen; Better known under his stage name Fredi, Siitonen previously took part in the contest, representing Finland as a singer in 1967 and 1976 with the songs "Varjoon – suojaan" and "Pump-Pump" respectively.

The song was also released in English under the title "I Will Follow Starlight".

== Composition ==
The song is an up-tempo track sung from the perspective of a woman "looking at the blue sky", singing to "the brightest star", and asking it to lead her. Contemporary assessments regarded the song's lyrics as reminiscent of a prayer. However, the mention of the 'blue sky' could also be associated with Finnish patriotism. The song has been likened to "L'Oiseau et l'Enfant", which won the Eurovision Song Contest in 1977; Helena later covered this song in Finnish under the title "Lintu ja lapsi".

The composition has also been mentioned as having strong similarities to César Cui's piano prelude Op. 64 No. 2 in E minor.

== At the Eurovision Song Contest ==
The song was performed fifth on the night, following Ireland's Cathal Dunne with "Happy Man" and preceding Monaco's Laurent Vaguener with "Notre vie c'est la musique". At the close of voting, it had received 38 points, placing 14th in a field of 19.

It was succeeded as Finnish representative at the 1980 contest by Vesa-Matti Loiri with "Huilumies". Katri Helena returned to the Contest in 1993 with "Tule luo".

== Reception ==
Despite its lack of success in the contest, the song did well commercially. The album of the same name sold over 33,000 copies, being certified gold in Finland for the year 1979. The song is well remembered in Finland, and counts for one of Katri Helena's biggest hits and signature tunes.

== Charts ==
Chart performance for "Katson sineen taivaan"
| Chart (1979) | Peak position |
|---|---|
| Finland (Jukebox chart) | 2 |
| Finland (Singles sales chart) | 3 |

== Covers ==
The song was covered by Kaija Koo in the first season of Vain elämää. The cover was subsequently featured on the compilation album Vain elämää jatkuu. In Finland the album was the third best-selling in 2012, and was certified multi-platinum, having sold over 110,000 copies domestically. The album peaked at number 1 on the Finnish album charts, retaining the top spot for 7 consecutive weeks.

Other notable covers by Finnish artists include a cover by rock band Jean S., and a cover by Aikakone soloist Sani.
