= Israel in the Eurovision Song Contest 1979 =

- Eurovision Song Contest 1979
- Participating broadcaster: Israel Broadcasting Authority (IBA)
- Country: Israel
- Selection process: Israel Song Festival 1979
- Selection date: 27 January 1979

Competing entry
- Song: "Hallelujah"
- Artist: Milk and Honey
- Songwriters: Shimrit Orr; Kobi Oshrat

Placement
- Final result: 1st, 125 points

Participation chronology

Israel was represented at the Eurovision Song Contest 1979 with the song "Hallelujah", composed by Kobi Oshrat, with lyrics by Shimrit Orr, and performed by Milk and Honey (made up of Gali Atari, Shmulik Bilu, Reuven Gvritz, and Yehuda Tamir). The Israeli participating broadcaster, the Israel Broadcasting Authority (IBA), selected its entry through a national final, which ultimately won the contest. In addition, IBA was also the host broadcaster and staged the event at the International Convention Center's Ussishkin Auditorium in Jerusalem, after winning the previous edition with the song "A-Ba-Ni-Bi" by Izhar Cohen and the Alphabeta.

== Before Eurovision ==
=== Israel Song Festival 1979 ===
Considering the unexpected but resounding success the Israel Broadcasting Authority (IBA) found in reformatting the annual Israel Song Festival as a Eurovision national final the previous year, it was only logical that they use it again to select their 1979 entry, which would additionally have the honor of being the host's entry in Jerusalem. The national final was held on 27 January 1979 in the International Convention Center, which would also serve as the venue for the international final two months later. It was hosted by Rivka Michaeli.

The eventual winner, "Hallelujah," had taken a long road in getting to the Festival: composer Kobi Oshrat had submitted it to the 1978 national final committee, but it was rejected, and was similarly rejected by international festivals in Chile and Japan. It was originally intended to be performed by Hakol Over Habibi, but lead singer Shlomit Aharon disliked the song and threatened to quit the group if they agreed to perform it. Oshrat and manager Shlomo Zach decided to organize a new group mimicking Hakol Over Habibi's "three men and a woman" lineup to perform the song after it was approved to compete in the 1979 Song Festival, and thus, Milk and Honey was born.

The song narrowly defeated Svika Pick's "Ein li ish milvadi" by two points from the regional juries to seal its ticket to the international final. Both Hakol Over Habibi and Pick would get their moments at Eurovision eventually: the former would represent Israel on their return to the contest in 1981, and the latter, after competing in many Israeli selection shows, would go on to write the Dana International song "Diva" with Yoav Ginai, which won the 1998 contest.

Final – 27 January 1979
R/O	Artist	Song	Points	Place
1	Gitit Shoval	"Shiv'a kanim"	30	8
2	Chaim Zadok	"Rikdi et ha' ketzev haze"	44	6
3	Shloshim Shana Ve Shir	"Od lo avda tikvatenu"	29	9
4	Sherry	"Le'olam be'ikvot ha'shemesh"	44	6
5	Irit Bolka and Vic Tavor	"Shir li, shiri li"	25	10
6	Milk and Honey	"Hallelujah"	63	1
7	Maya Casabianca	"Hayom efshar lashir"	18	11
8	Sexta	"Noladeti la shalom"	46	5
9	Tzila Dagan	"Im halayla"	18	11
10	Riki Gal	"Toda raba"	49	4
11	Svika Pick	"Ein li ish milvadi"	61	2
12	Hedva Amrani	"Shneynu yachdav"	55	3

== At Eurovision ==
The IBA organised the Eurovision Song Contest 1979 following Izhar Cohen and the Alphabeta's victory in Paris with "A-Ba-Ni-Bi" the year prior. It was a major undertaking for the network, especially considering they had only just started occasional color broadcasts, but the opportunity would not be wasted. The 1979 contest was hosted by Daniel Pe'er and Yardena Arazi, formerly of 1976 representatives Chocolate, Menta, Mastik and a future entrant in her own right (as well as, allegedly, one of the acts who rejected the opportunity to perform "Hallelujah"). While the contest's musical director was Izhak Graziani, conductor of the IBA Radio and Television Orchestra, Oshrat himself sought the opportunity to lead the orchestra for his composition. Given his limited experience as a conductor, he did little more than count the beat alongside the metronome, but with more experience he would go on to conduct the Israeli entry in four more international finals (1985, 1987, 1991, and 1992; he also composed the 1985 and 1992 entries). The song initially ran over the three-minute time limit, putting the host network in danger of having their own entry disqualified, but the omission of a repeated refrain brought it within EBU requirements.

Israel performed tenth on the night of the contest, following Germany and preceding France. Continuing "Hallelujah"'s long history of narrow victories, Israel were neck-in-neck with Spain's "Su canción" by Betty Missiego for most of the voting. While initial marks were promising for Israel and less so for Spain (three of the first six juries gave Israel twelve points, and four failed to award Spain any points), it wouldn't be long before the two would power past stiff competition from France and Germany to be very close contenders. Before the final jury voted, Spain were one ahead point of Israel, leading by 116 to 115. As it happened, Spain were also the last to vote, and if they awarded Israel any points at all, they would win (even if they only awarded Israel one point, the count-back rules at the time in the event of a tie stated that the song with the most top scores would win; Israel ended the night with six to Spain's four). In the end, Spain proved fair players: their jury awarded Israel ten points, sealing Israel's second consecutive victory. It marked the third occasion a country won two years in a row, following Spain themselves (in 1968 and 1969) and Luxembourg (in 1972 and 1973; coincidentally, Anne-Marie David, who had scored the second of Luxembourg's back-to-back wins, represented France that year and finished third behind Spain and Israel). This feat would not be repeated again until Ireland's hat-trick of victories in the 1990s. All but two countries voted for "Hallelujah" (Germany and Italy), and six (Finland, Ireland, Norway, Portugal, Sweden, and the United Kingdom) awarded Israel twelve points. Israel themselves awarded twelve points to Denmark's Tommy Seebach with "Disco Tango."

=== Voting ===
Points awarded to Israel
Score	Country
12 points	Finland; Ireland; Norway; Portugal; Sweden; United Kingdom
10 points	Spain
8 points	Austria; Luxembourg; Monaco
7 points	
6 points	Denmark
5 points	Switzerland
4 points	Greece
3 points	
2 points	Belgium
1 point	France; Netherlands

Points awarded by Israel
Score	Country
12 points	Denmark
10 points	Greece
8 points	Spain
7 points	Netherlands
6 points	Germany
5 points	France
4 points	Switzerland
3 points	Ireland
2 points	Norway
1 point	Sweden

== After Eurovision ==
"Hallelujah" proved to be a major international success, reaching the top ten of nine international charts and peaking at #1 in five (Finland, Ireland, Israel, Norway, and Sweden). The group recorded versions in English, German, French, and Dutch, and there have also been recordings in Afrikaans and Czech by other artists. Milk and Honey themselves, or at least the lineup that performed the song at Eurovision, were not to last: Gali Atari wished to pursue a solo career, and after scoring another international hit with "Goodbye New York," she left the group acrimoniously. Milk and Honey, with Leah Lupatin filling in for Atari, would compete together again at the 1981 and 1989 national selections, while Yehuda Tamir would attempt a solo return in 1986. Tamir and Gvritz would accompany 1979 co-host Yardena Arazi on her Eurovision comeback in 1988, with the song "Ben Adam." The group (with Lupatin) also reunited to perform "Hallelujah" at the 1981 Songs of Europe anniversary concert in Norway, with Oshrat once again leading the orchestra.

The IBA were unable to host the contest two years in a row, as they had already spent a considerable amount of money on the 1979 contest and feared they would go bankrupt if they tried to host again. Dutch broadcaster NOS stepped in to host the following year's contest in The Hague, but due to the eventual decided date coinciding with Yom HaZikaron (the Israeli Day of Remembrance), the reigning champions became the first and only to not return to defend their title the following year. The Israel Song Festival was held as usual, leading many to suspect that the winning song, "Pizmon Hozer" by The Brothers & the Sisters, was going to represent Israel prior to their withdrawal; however, given that the Festival was organized and held after Israel had already announced their plans to withdraw, this would seem unlikely. "Hallelujah" was succeeded as winner by Ireland's Johnny Logan with "What's Another Year" and as the Israeli entry by Hakol Over Habibi with "Halayla" in 1981.

"Hallelujah" has lived on as a Eurovision standard in the years following its win. With the exception of Songs of Europe, the majority of live performances (particularly those in connection to Eurovision) have been by Atari, who has performed the song at Congratulations: 50 Years of the Eurovision Song Contest (2005), the Eurovision Song Contest 2019 (as part of the "Switch Song" medley, alongside Conchita Wurst, Måns Zelmerlöw, Eleni Foureira, and Verka Serduchka), Het Grote Songfestivalfeest (2019, alongside hosts Tim Douwsma and Buddy Vedder), and Eurovision: Europe Shine a Light (2020, alongside veterans of the Junior Songfestival, the Dutch Junior Eurovision selection show). Additionally, the song was performed at the end of the Eurovision Song Contest 1999 in Jerusalem by all that year's contestants, in tribute to the victims of the Yugoslav Wars, and by fellow 1979 contestant Anne-Marie David in Eurovision Song Contest's Greatest Hits (2015).
