= Manuela Bravo =

Portuguese singer (born 1957)

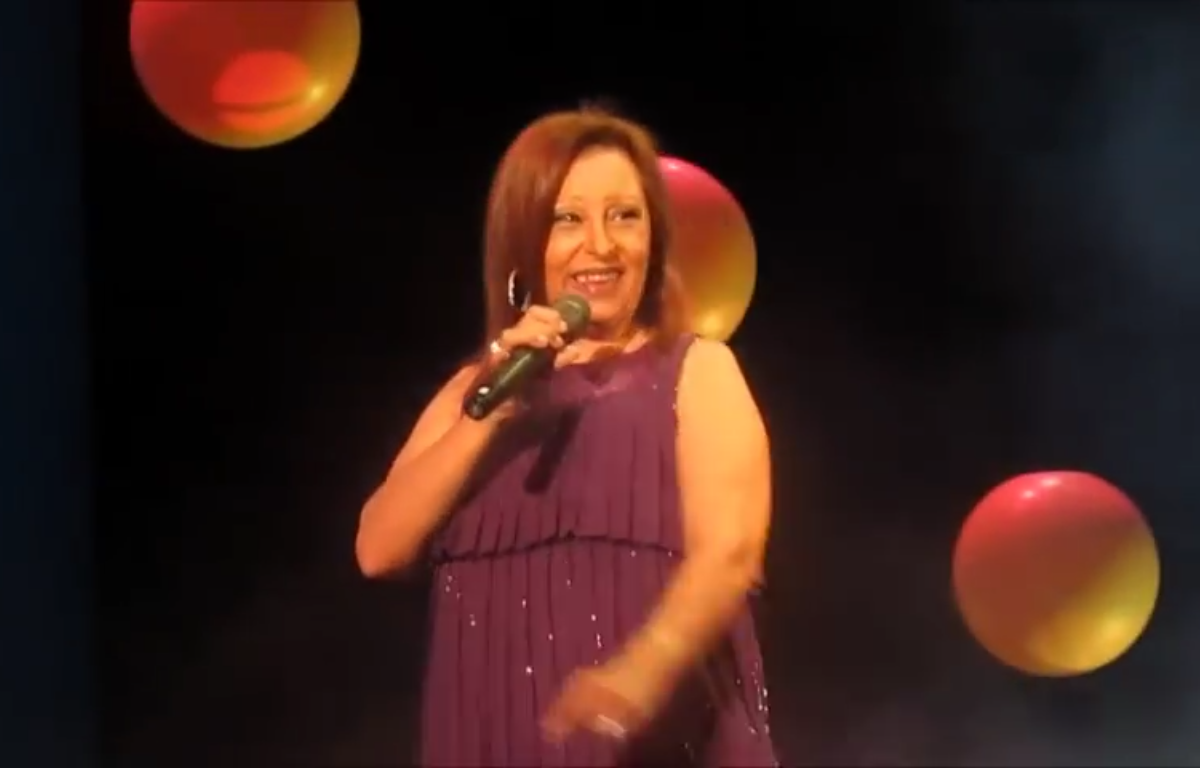
Manuela Bravo in 2015

Maria Manuela de Oliveira Moreira Bravo, known as Manuela Bravo (born 7 December 1957) is a Portuguese singer.

Bravo made her first public appearance when she was only 5 years old in Cinema Éden, in Lisbon (which is now closed). When she was 15 years old, she released her first single with two songs composed by José Cid, "Nova Geração" and "Another Time", where she appeared with the band Quarteto 1111. In 1975, Bravo released a new single, with arrangements and orchestrations by Jorge Palma, being the two songs "Tínhamos Vinte Anos" and "Soldado-Escravo" (the last entitled the single) composed by Tozé Brito.

In 1979 Manuela Bravo won the Festival da Canção with the song "Sobe, sobe, balão sobe", composed by Nóbrega e Sousa, and represented Portugal in the Eurovision Song Contest 1979. She ended the contest in 9th place.

Her father Loubet Bravo (1910-1978), was a Coimbra fado singer.

== Discography ==
=== Singles ===
- Nova Geração / Another Time (Single, Valentim de Carvalho, 1973)
- Tínhamos Vinte Anos/Soldado-Escravo (Single, Valentim de Carvalho, 1975)
- Sobe Sobe Balão Sobe/Meu Tempo Novo de Viver (Single, Vadeca, 1979)
- Adeus Amor/Até Quando (Single, vadeca, 1979)
- Recordações/Estranha Forma de Amor (Single, Vadeca, 1980)
- Tu E só Tu/Por Uma Vez (Single, Orfeu, 19**)
- Quando A Banda Chegar/Adeus Que Te Vou Deixar (Single, 1981)
- Tango/Não Sei Porque (Single, Orfeu, 1985)
- O Meu Herói/Quero (Single, 1986)

=== Albums ===
- Manuela Bravo (CD, Soprosom, 1993)

== Sources and bibliographical references ==
- (in Portuguese) Photos and information about Manuela Bravo

Awards and achievements
Preceded by Gemini with "Dai li dou"	Portugal in the Eurovision Song Contest; 1979	Succeeded by José Cid with "Um grande, grande amor"
