= Denmark in the Eurovision Song Contest 1979 =

- Eurovision Song Contest 1979
- Participating broadcaster: Danmarks Radio (DR)
- Country: Denmark
- Selection process: Dansk Melodi Grand Prix 1979
- Selection date: 3 February 1979

Competing entry
- Song: "Disco Tango"
- Artist: Tommy Seebach
- Songwriters: Tommy Seebach; Keld Heick

Placement
- Final result: 6th, 76 points

Participation chronology

Denmark was represented at the Eurovision Song Contest 1979 with the song "Disco Tango", composed by Tommy Seebach, with lyrics by Keld Heick, and performed by Seebach himself. The Danish participating broadcaster, Danmarks Radio (DR), organised the Dansk Melodi Grand Prix 1979 in order to select its entry for the contest. This was the first of Seebach's three Eurovision appearances for Denmark. The 1979 DMGP is notable for the participation of two of Denmark's three Eurovision winners, Grethe Ingmann and the Olsen Brothers.

== Before Eurovision ==
=== Melodi Grand Prix 79 ===
Danmarks Radio (DR) held the Melodi Grand Prix 79 on 3 February at TV-Byen in Gladsaxe, hosted by Jørgen de Mylius. 17 songs took part with the winner being decided by votes from eight regional juries. The main voting resulted in a tie for first place between "Disco Tango" performed by Tommy Seebach and "Alt er skønt" performed by Grethe Ingmann and Bjarne Liller. The tie was resolved after a revote, which was won by "Disco Tango" performed by Tommy Seebach.

Rasmus Lyberth performed in Greenlandic, and Annika Hoydal in Faroese.

Final – 3 February 1979
R/O	Artist	Song	Points	Place
1	Pia Dalsgaard and Thorstein Thomsen	"Maja og bruttonationalproduktet"	19	9
2	Rasmus Lyberth	"Faders bøn"	7	11
3	Allan Mortensen	"Møllesangen"	13	10
4	Pierre Dørge	"Motorvej'n"	0	15
5	Jannie Høeg	"Du er min melodi"	1	13
6	Olsen Brothers	"Dans, dans, dans"	32	8
7	Grethe Ingmann and Bjarne Liller	"Alt er skønt"	82	2
8	Tamra Rosanes	"Fairplay"	2	12
9	Tommy Seebach	"Disco Tango"	82	1
10	Mona Larsen	"En underlig samba"	0	15
11	Mabel	"Saturday Show"	39	5
12	Lecia and Lucienne	"Dit liv, mit liv"	37	7
13	Pia Rosenbaum and Ina Rosenbaum	"Smil over Strøget"	38	6
14	Nis P Jørgensen	"Eja, eja"	1	13
15	Kim Larsen	"Ud i det blå"	56	3
16	Anette Toft	"Hold fast"	0	15
17	Annika Hoydal	"Aldan"	55	4

Detailed Regional Jury Votes
R/O	Song	Rønne	Aalborg	Næstved	Aabenraa	Copenhagen	Holstebro	Odense	Aarhus	Total
1	"Maja & bruttonationalproduktet"	1	3	5		2	2		6	19
2	"Faders bøn"					4	3			7
3	"Møllesangen"	2	4	2	2	1		2		13
4	"Motorvej'n"									0
5	"Du er min melodi"				1					1
6	"Dans-dans-dans"	6	7	3	3		5	6	2	32
7	"Alt er skønt"	12	12	10	8	8	10	12	10	82
8	"Fairplay"							1	1	2
9	"Disco Tango"	8	10	8	12	12	12	8	12	82
10	"En underlig samba"									0
11	"Saturday Show"	5		4	4	5	6	10	5	39
12	"Dit liv, mit liv"	7	6	1	5	7	4	4	3	37
13	"Smil over Strøget"	4	2	6	7	3	1	7	8	38
14	"Eja, eja"		1							1
15	"Ud i det blå"	10	8	7	10	6	8	3	4	56
16	"Hold fast"									0
17	"Aldan"	3	5	12	6	10	7	5	7	55

Tie-Break
Song	Points	Place
"Alt er skønt"	36	2
"Disco Tango"	51	1

== At Eurovision ==
On the night of the final Seebach performed 3rd in the running order, following Italy and preceding Ireland. Among the backing singers was Debbie Cameron, with whom Seebach would perform as a duo in Eurovision 1981. At the close of voting "Disco Tango" had received 76 points, placing Denmark 6th of the 19 entries. The Danish jury awarded its 12 points to Germany.

The contest was broadcast on DR TV, with commentary by Jørgen de Mylius.

=== Voting ===
Points awarded to Denmark
Score	Country
12 points	Greece; Israel
10 points	Germany
8 points	Netherlands
7 points	Belgium
6 points	France
5 points	
4 points	Luxembourg; Spain
3 points	Austria; Monaco; United Kingdom
2 points	Ireland
1 point	Sweden; Switzerland

Points awarded by Denmark
Score	Country
12 points	Germany
10 points	United Kingdom
8 points	Netherlands
7 points	Switzerland
6 points	Israel
5 points	Ireland
4 points	Monaco
3 points	Spain
2 points	Belgium
1 point	Greece
