= Eurovision Song Contest 1979 =

International song competition

Date and venue
- Final: 31 March 1979
- Venue: International Convention Center; Jerusalem, Israel

Organisation
- Organiser: European Broadcasting Union (EBU)
- Scrutineer: Frank Naef

Production
- Host broadcaster: Israel Broadcasting Authority (IBA)
- Director: Yossi Zemach
- Executive producer: Alex Gilady
- Musical director: Izhak Graziani
- Presenters: Daniel Pe'er; Yardena Arazi

Participants
- Number of entries: 19
- Non-returning countries: Turkey
- Participation map: Competing countries Countries that participated in the past but not in 1979

Vote
- Voting system: Each country awarded 12, 10, 8–1 point(s) to their 10 favourite songs
- Winning song: Israel "Hallelujah"

The Eurovision Song Contest 1979 was the 24th edition of the Eurovision Song Contest, held on 31 March 1979 at the Menachem Ussishkin auditorium of the International Convention Centre in Jerusalem, Israel, and presented by Daniel Pe'er and Yardena Arazi. It was organised by the European Broadcasting Union (EBU) and host broadcaster the Israel Broadcasting Authority (IBA), who staged the event after winning the 1978 contest for Israel with the song "A-Ba-Ni-Bi" by Izhar Cohen and the Alphabeta. This was the first time that the Eurovision Song Contest was held outside Europe.

Broadcasters from nineteen countries participated in the contest, with Turkey deciding not to participate after Arab countries had pressured it into not participating in a contest held in Israel. Yugoslavia, which had missed the 1977 and 1978 contests, also did not take part in or broadcast the contest this year for political reasons, despite an earlier public poll in which almost 100,000 people supported a Yugoslav return to the contest.

The winner was Israel, with the song "Hallelujah", composed by Kobi Oshrat, written by Shimrit Orr, and performed by the group Milk and Honey featuring Gali Atari. It was the second victory for Israel and the third time any country had won the contest two consecutive time; Spain did so in 1969 (in a four-way tie) and Luxembourg did so in 1973. Spain, France, Germany and Ireland rounded out the top five.

== Location ==
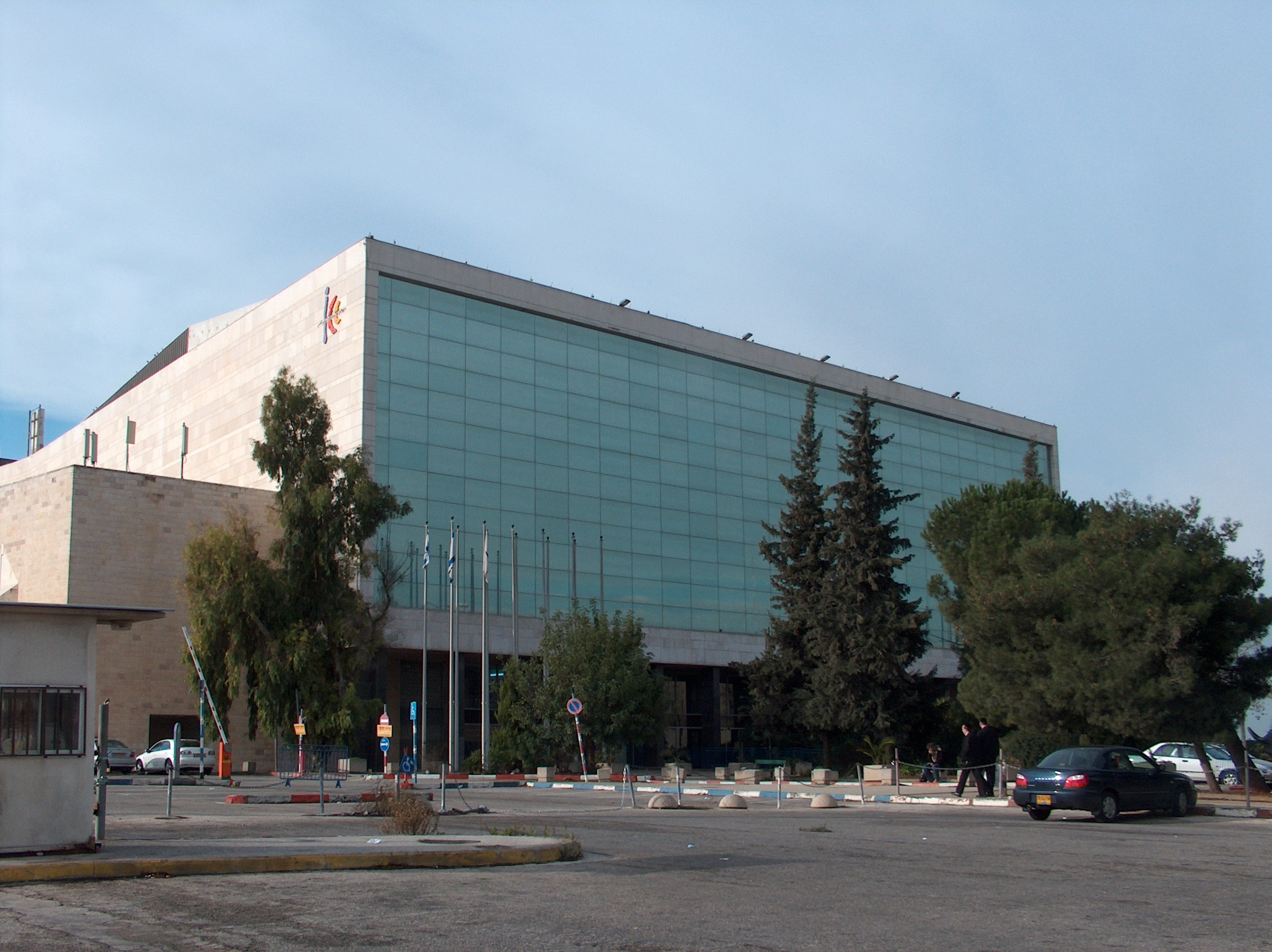
International Convention Center, Jerusalem – host venue of the 1979 contest.

The 1979 contest took place in Jerusalem, Israel, following the win of Israel Broadcasting Authority (IBA) at the 1978 edition with the song "A-Ba-Ni-Bi" performed by Izhar Cohen and Alphabeta. IBA staged the contest at the Menachem Ussishkin auditorium of the International Convention Centre, also called Binyenei HaUma. The venue, inside the largest convention center in the Middle East, seats an audience of 3,104 and traditionally hosts other musical events.

== Participants ==
Initially, Türkiye Radyo ve Televizyon Kurumu (TRT) intended to participate in the contest. Turkey would have appeared 11th on stage (between Israel and France), represented by the song "Seviyorum" performed by Maria Rita Epik and 21. Peron. However TRT later ended up withdrawing from the contest following pressure from Arab states, who objected to a predominantly Muslim country taking part in a contest held in Israel.

Several of the performing artists had previously competed as lead artists representing the same country in past editions: Peter, Sue and Marc had represented Switzerland in 1971 and in 1976; Xandra had represented the Netherlands in 1972 along with Andres Holten and in 1976 as Sandra Reemer; and Anita Skorgan had represented Norway in 1977. In addition, Anne-Marie David representing France, had won the contest for Luxembourg in 1973.

Eurovision Song Contest 1979 participants
Country	Broadcaster	Artist	Song	Language	Songwriter(s)	Conductor
Austria	ORF	Christina Simon	"Heute in Jerusalem"	German	André Heller; Peter Wolf	Richard Oesterreicher
Belgium	BRT	Micha Marah	"Hey Nana"	Dutch	Guy Beyers; Charles Dumolin	Francis Bay
Denmark	DR	Tommy Seebach	"Disco Tango"	Danish	Keld Heick; Tommy Seebach	Allan Botschinsky
Finland	YLE	Katri Helena	"Katson sineen taivaan"	Finnish	Vexi Salmi; Matti Siitonen	Ossi Runne
France	TF1	Anne-Marie David	"Je suis l'enfant soleil"	French	Hubert Giraud; Eddy Marnay	Guy Mattéoni
Germany	BR (Note: On behalf of the German public broadcasting consortium ARD)	Dschinghis Khan	"Dschinghis Khan"	German	Bernd Meinunger; Ralph Siegel	Norbert Daum
Greece	ERT	Elpida	"Socrates" (Σωκράτη)	Greek	Doros Georgiades; Sotia Tsotou	Lefteris Halkiadakis
Ireland	RTÉ	Cathal Dunne	"Happy Man"	English	Cathal Dunne	Proinnsías Ó Duinn
Israel	IBA	Milk and Honey	"Hallelujah" (הללויה)	Hebrew	Shimrit Orr; Kobi Oshrat	Kobi Oshrat
Italy	RAI	Matia Bazar	"Raggio di luna"	Italian	Piero Cassano; Giancarlo Golzi; Carlo Marrale; Antonella Ruggiero; Aldo Stellita	No conductor
Luxembourg	CLT	Jeane Manson	"J'ai déjà vu ça dans tes yeux"	French	Jean Renard	Hervé Roy
Monaco	TMC	Laurent Vaguener	"Notre vie c'est la musique"	French	Jean Albertini; Didier Barbelivien; Jean Baudlot; Paul de Senneville	Gérard Salesses
Netherlands	NOS	Xandra	"Colorado"	Dutch	Rob Bolland; Ferdi Bolland; Gerard Cox	Harry van Hoof
Norway	NRK	Anita Skorgan	"Oliver"	Norwegian	Philip Kruse; Anita Skorgan	Sigurd Jansen
Portugal	RTP	Manuela Bravo	"Sobe, sobe, balão sobe"	Portuguese	Carlos Nóbrega e Sousa	Thilo Krasmann
Spain	TVE	Betty Missiego	"Su canción"	Spanish	Fernando Moreno	José Luis Navarro
Sweden	SR	Ted Gärdestad	"Satellit"	Swedish	Kenneth Gärdestad; Ted Gärdestad	Lars Samuelson
Switzerland	SRG SSR	Peter, Sue and Marc, Pfuri, Gorps and Kniri	"Trödler und Co."	German	Peter Reber	Rolf Zuckowski
United Kingdom	BBC	Black Lace	"Mary Ann"	English	Peter Morris	Ken Jones

Eurovision Song Contest 1979 – Participation summaries by country
- Austria; Belgium; Denmark; Finland; France; Germany; Greece; Ireland; Israel; Italy; Luxembourg; Monaco; Netherlands; Norway; Portugal; Spain; Sweden; Switzerland; ~~Turkey~~; United Kingdom

== Production ==
The contest was organised and broadcast by the Israel Broadcasting Authority (IBA) and the European Broadcasting Union (EBU). The event was produced by Alex Gilady, directed by Yossi Zemach, musically directed by Izhak Graziani who conducted the IBA Symphony Orchestra, and overseen by the EBU with scrutineer Frank Naef. Since Israeli Television had yet to broadcast in colour at that point (except for a few special occasions), the production had to borrow cameras from the BBC – the same had happened when RTÉ had hosted the 1971 contest in Dublin. The 24th contest's logo featured a combination of a G-clef, the IBA logo, and the names of all participating countries in order of appearance. The IBA Symphony Orchestra played the music of each song, except for the Italian entry, which did not use the orchestra. This was the only contest where the orchestra was composed of 39 musicians.

The stage concept was designed by Dov Ben David. On stage there was a moving symbol which was based on the IBA logo (which was built like a lamp with 3 concentric rings) using a small projected model. The event showcased stage decorations of several types of flora which represent the Land of Israel, and a film of Jerusalem's varied ancient, modern and religious scenery. The left side of the stage where the presentation was held, was decorated with prickly pear cactus, date, pomegranate, and orange plants. The film which opened the programme and repeated over its closing credits, screened Jerusalem's biblical and medieval monuments sacred to Judaism, Christianity, and Islam with residents and visitors who frequent them while its opening and concluding images showcased the city's cultural and governmental institutions along with different types of people outside the ancient walls.

This year, the postcards between each song featured mime artists rather than the participating singers. The mime artists featured were the Yoram Boker Mime Group, and included some of Israel's leading mime artists, among them Ezra Dagan and Hanoch Rozen. The group performed on a background of illustrations created by Dudu Geva and Yochanan Lakitzevitz, that featured landmarks and typical landscapes of the respective countries.

== Contest overview ==
The following tables reflect the confirmed, verified scores, which were adjusted after the live broadcast. During the voting announcement, mistakes kept appearing as some spokespersons gave multiple votes of the same amount to two countries. Importantantly, due to a misunderstanding by the presenter Yardena Arazi, Spain appeared to award 10 points to both Portugal and Israel and these scores were added to the scoreboard. After the programme, verification confirmed that Portugal should only have received six points, leaving the total Portuguese score reduced by four points to 64.

The intermission between the songs and the voting was presented by a performance of the Shalom '79 Dancing Ensemble, who performed a variety of Israeli folk dances. The performance was directed by the ensemble's manager and choreographer Gavri Levy.

Results of the Eurovision Song Contest 1979
R/O	Country	Artist	Song	Points	Place
1	Portugal	Manuela Bravo	"Sobe, sobe, balão sobe"	64	9
2	Italy	Matia Bazar	"Raggio di luna"	27	15
3	Denmark	Tommy Seebach	"Disco Tango"	76	6
4	Ireland	Cathal Dunne	"Happy Man"	80	5
5	Finland	Katri Helena	"Katson sineen taivaan"	38	14
6	Monaco	Laurent Vaguener	"Notre vie c'est la musique"	12	16
7	Greece	Elpida	"Socrates"	69	8
8	Switzerland	Peter, Sue and Marc, Pfuri, Gorps and Kniri	"Trödler und Co."	60	10
9	Germany	Dschinghis Khan	"Dschinghis Khan"	86	4
10	Israel	Milk and Honey	"Hallelujah"	125	1
11	France	Anne-Marie David	"Je suis l'enfant soleil"	106	3
12	Belgium	Micha Marah	"Hey Nana"	5	18
13	Luxembourg	Jeane Manson	"J'ai déjà vu ça dans tes yeux"	44	13
14	Netherlands	Xandra	"Colorado"	51	12
15	Sweden	Ted Gärdestad	"Satellit"	8	17
16	Norway	Anita Skorgan	"Oliver"	57	11
17	United Kingdom	Black Lace	"Mary Ann"	73	7
18	Austria	Christina Simon	"Heute in Jerusalem"	5	18
19	Spain	Betty Missiego	"Su canción"	116	2

=== Spokespersons ===
Each participating broadcaster appointed a spokesperson who was responsible for announcing the votes for its respective country via telephone. Known spokespersons at the 1979 contest are listed below.

- Finland – Kaarina Pönniö
- Netherlands – Ivo Niehe
- Sweden – Sven Lindahl
- United Kingdom – Colin Berry

== Detailed voting results ==
Each participating broadcaster assembled a jury who awarded 12, 10, 8, 7, 6, 5, 4, 3, 2, 1 point(s) for their top ten songs. This was the last year in which the points were announced via order of appearance, as opposed to order of preference. From the next year's contest onwards, the points were announced in ascending order instead. This has remained in place ever since.

The voting was extremely close. Israel gained a good lead in the early stages of the voting, but Spain eventually caught up and took a good lead themselves. At the close of the penultimate jury's votes, Israel were one point behind Spain, and only the Spanish jury had yet to give their votes. Spain ended up giving Israel 10 points, thus giving the victory to the latter country for the second time in a row.

Detailed voting results
		Total score	Portugal	Italy	Denmark	Ireland	Finland	Monaco	Greece	Switzerland	Germany	Israel	France	Belgium	Luxembourg	Netherlands	Sweden	Norway	United Kingdom	Austria	Spain
Contestants	Portugal	64		6			2	5		4	4		10	5	3	3	3	6		7	6
Contestants	Italy	27	8				8											3			8
Contestants	Denmark	76				2		3	12	1	10	12	6	7	4	8	1		3	3	4
Contestants	Ireland	80	5	5	5		6		10	6	6	3		10	7		8	5	4		
Contestants	Finland	38		7					7	8	5		5		6						
Contestants	Monaco	12	1	2	4								3								2
Contestants	Greece	69	10		1	4		7		7	2	10	4	1	5	7	2			2	7
Contestants	Switzerland	60			7	1	10	2	2		7	4	7					8		12	
Contestants	Germany	86	2	1	12	5	3	12				6	12	4	1	2	6		8		12
Contestants	Israel	125	12		6	12	12	8	4	5			1	2	8	1	12	12	12	8	10
Contestants	France	106	6	10			1	10	8	10		5		6	12	12	5	7	6	5	3
Contestants	Belgium	5			2						1								2		
Contestants	Luxembourg	44	7			3	4	4	5	3			2			4		2	10		
Contestants	Netherlands	51			8	10	5		3		3	7		3			4	4		4	
Contestants	Sweden	8				6			1			1									
Contestants	Norway	57	3	3		8		6				2		8	2	6	10		7	1	1
Contestants	United Kingdom	73	4	8	10	7	7	1		2	8					5		10		6	5
Contestants	Austria	5		4															1		
Contestants	Spain	116		12	3				6	12	12	8	8	12	10	10	7	1	5	10	

=== 12 points ===
Below is a summary of all 12 points in the final:

N.	Contestant	Nation(s) giving 12 points
6	Israel	Finland, Ireland, Norway, Portugal, Sweden, United Kingdom
4	Germany	Denmark, France, Monaco, Spain
4	Spain	Belgium, Germany, Italy, Switzerland
2	Denmark	Greece, Israel
2	France	Luxembourg, Netherlands
1	Switzerland	Austria

== Broadcasts ==
Each participating broadcaster was required to relay the contest via its networks. Non-participating EBU member broadcasters were also able to relay the contest as "passive participants". Broadcasters were able to send commentators to provide coverage of the contest in their own native language and to relay information about the artists and songs to their television viewers.

In addition to the participating countries, the contest was also reportedly broadcast in Hong Kong, Iceland, and Romania. The contest was not broadcast in Yugoslavia for the first time since 1960, as the nation had no diplomatic ties with Israel. Estimates ranged from 200 to 500 million viewers were reported prior to the contest. Known details on the broadcasts in each country, including the specific broadcasting stations and commentators are shown in the tables below.

Broadcasters and commentators in participating countries
Country	Broadcaster	Channel(s)	Commentator(s)	Ref(s)
Austria	ORF	FS1	Max Schautzer	
Belgium	BRT	TV1	Luc Appermont	
Belgium	BRT	BRT 2 Omroep Brabant		
Belgium	RTBF	RTBF1	Paule Herreman	
Belgium	RTBF	RTBF 1 (Note: Simulcast on RTBF 2)		
Denmark	DR	DR TV	Jørgen de Mylius	
Finland	YLE	TV1, Rinnakkaisohjelma	Matti Paalosmaa	
France	TF1		Marc Menant	
Germany	ARD	Deutsches Fernsehen	Gaby Schnelle and Ado Schlier	
Greece	ERT	ERT, A Programma		
Ireland	RTÉ	RTÉ 1	Mike Murphy	
Ireland	RTÉ	RTÉ Radio	Liam Devally	
Israel	IBA	Israeli Television		
Israel	Army Radio			
Italy	RAI	Rete Uno (Note: Deferred broadcast at 21:50 CET (20:50 UTC))	Rosanna Vaudetti	
Luxembourg	CLT	RTL Télé-Luxembourg		
Luxembourg	CLT	RTL Radio		
Netherlands	NOS	Nederland 2	Willem Duys	
Norway	NRK	NRK Fjernsynet	Egil Teige	
Norway	NRK	NRK	Erik Heyerdahl	
Portugal	RTP	RTP1	Fialho Gouveia	
Portugal	RDP	RDP Programa 1		
Spain	TVE	TVE 1	Miguel de los Santos	
Sweden	SR	TV1	Ulf Elfving	
Sweden	SR	SR P3	Kent Finell	
Switzerland	SRG SSR	TV DRS (Note: Broadcast through a second audio programme on TSR)	Max Rüeger	
Switzerland	SRG SSR	TSR	Georges Hardy	
Switzerland	SRG SSR	TSI		
Switzerland	SRG SSR	RSI 1		
United Kingdom	BBC	BBC1	John Dunn	
United Kingdom	BBC	BBC Radio 2 (Note: Simulcast on BBC Radio 1 VHF)	Ray Moore	

Broadcasters and commentators in non-participating countries
Country	Broadcaster	Channel(s)	Commentator(s)	Ref(s)
Hong Kong	TVB	TVB Jade (Note: Deferred broadcast on 1 April at 10:30 (HKT))	Regina Hing Yue Tsang and Lee Chi-chung	
Hong Kong	TVB	TVB Pearl	George Lam	
Iceland	RÚV	Sjónvarpið (Note: Delayed broadcast on 16 April 1979 at 21:20 WET (21:20 UTC))	Björn Baldursson	
Netherlands Antilles	ATM	TeleAruba (Note: Delayed broadcast on 18 June 1979 at 21:00 (ADT))		
Netherlands Antilles	ATM	TeleCuraçao (Note: Delayed broadcast on 13 April 1979 at 21:11 (ADT))		

== See also ==
- OTI Festival 1979
