= Finland in the Eurovision Song Contest 1979 =

- Eurovision Song Contest 1979
- Participating broadcaster: Yleisradio (Yle)
- Country: Finland
- Selection process: National final
- Selection date: 10 February 1979

Competing entry
- Song: "Katson sineen taivaan"
- Artist: Katri Helena
- Songwriters: Matti Siitonen; Vexi Salmi

Placement
- Final result: 14th, 38 points

Participation chronology

Finland was represented at the Eurovision Song Contest 1979 with the song "Katson sineen taivaan", composed by Matti Siitonen, with lyrics by Vexi Salmi, and performed by Katri Helena. The Finnish participating broadcaster, Yleisradio (Yle), selected its entry through a national final. This was the first of Katri Helena's two Eurovision appearances for Finland, after she had finished runner-up in three previous national finals (1969, 1972, and 1978).

== Before Eurovision ==
=== National final ===
Six entries were selected for the competition from almost 300 received submissions. Yleisradio (Yle) held the national final on 10 February 1979 at the Kulttuuritalo in Helsinki, hosted by Marjatta Leppänen. The final was held in conjunction with the Intervision national final. The winner was chosen by a 30-member jury containing ten music industry professionals and twenty music listeners.

In addition to the performances of the competing entries, the show was opened by Seija Simola performing her 1978 entry "Anna rakkaudelle tilaisuus".

Final – 10 February 1979
R/O	Artist	Song	Songwriter(s)	Points	Place
1	Seidat	"Hei, tännepäin"	Eeva Kiviharju	78	6
2	Markku Aro	"Sano Susanne"	Esa Nieminen; Juha Vainio	94	5
3	Yvonne Gräsbeck	"Hyvästi ystäväin"	Lasse Mirsch	113	2
4	Katri Helena	"Katson sineen taivaan"	Matti Siitonen; Vexi Salmi	140	1
5	Kirka, Anna and Muska	"Aikuiset anteeksi antaa"	Eero Lupari	95	4
6	Pepe Willberg	"Päivä tuskin päättyis kauniimmin"	Pepe Willberg; Markku Johansson; Juha Vainio	110	3

== At Eurovision ==
On the night of the final Katri Helena performed 5th in the running order, following Ireland and preceding Monaco. Katri Helena was accompanied by Vesa Enne, Kalle Fält, Ami Jaara and Paula Karppanen as backing vocalists. At the close of voting "Katson sineen taivaan" had picked up 38 points, placing Finland 14th of the 19 entries. The Finnish jury awarded its 12 points to contest winners Israel.

=== Voting ===
Points awarded to Finland
Score	Country
12 points	
10 points	
8 points	Switzerland
7 points	Greece; Italy
6 points	Luxembourg
5 points	France; Germany
4 points	
3 points	
2 points	
1 point	

Points awarded by Finland
Score	Country
12 points	Israel
10 points	Switzerland
8 points	Italy
7 points	United Kingdom
6 points	Ireland
5 points	Netherlands
4 points	Luxembourg
3 points	Germany
2 points	Portugal
1 point	France
