= 21. Peron =

Turkish progressive rock band

21. Peron (21st Platform) was a Turkish progressive rock band in the 1970s. The band was chosen to represent Turkey in the 1979 Eurovision Song Contest with a song called "Seviyorum"; however, due to political concerns, Turkey did not attend the final, which took place in Israel.

== Formation ==
The group was founded at the Turkish High School Music and Folk Dance Competition, organized by the Milliyet newspaper in 1970. İzmir Koleji participated in the competition with "Sound of Solitude". Andreas Wildermann was the keyboardist of the group. They came first in the "performance" category, and second in the "composition" category. In 1972, they came second in both categories at the same competition. This time, alongside Wildermann on the organ, guitarist Haluk Öztekin, who would later join the band, was also present. In their performances, they sometimes covered songs of famous groups such as The Who in addition to their compositions. In 1973, Öztekin and Wildermann entered the Aegean University. 21. Peron was formed in Bornova, Izmir, on 11 July 1973, during a meeting of 6 people at the 11th bus stop at 11 o'clock. The first formation of the group included Wildermann as the keyboardist, Öztekin and Seyhan Eriş as the guitarists, Aron Serez as the bassist, Halil Yildirim as the drummer, and Alp Gültekin as the violinist. The band played foreign rock music and Anatolian rock music, which was popular during that period. In 1974, they prepared a single for Ümit Tuncağ, a radio program on TRT (Turkish Radio Television). During this period, they began to make their own music. They had their first concerts in 1975. In May that year, they made their first recordings at the homes of various friends. The songs on these records include "Anne", "18400 TL", "F.M.O. (Possibly Film Soundtrack)", "My Childhood Memories" and, "Petrushka", which they performed over a composition by Igor Stravinsky.

== Eurovision Song Contest and dissolution ==
The band was chosen to represent Turkey in the 1979 Eurovision Song Contest with a song called "Seviyorum", written by Epik. However, a month later, Turkey decided not to participate in the contest, which was held in Israel, because of pressure from Arab countries. Epik and 21. Peron recorded song titles like "Seviyorum" in the same year. This record was in soft rock and pop instead of Peron's earlier works. Half of the album was composed by Epik, and the other half was composed by 21. Peron. Two of them were Necati Cumali poems ("Rainy Sea" and "This Side of the Night"), and two of them came from Orhan Veli Kanık poems ("I can not say" and "Suddenly") with their compositions. They decided to leave Epik and continue their solo career, as the group's producers were not satisfied with the changes to the group. However, in 1980, the group members decided to go their separate ways and disbanded.

== Reunion and Tapon ==
Wildermann, Öztekin, Akçay, Erdem and Gültekin reunited in 2012, along with a new, young singer named Deniz Yıldırım. In March 2014, they released their third album Tapon ("rubbish").
