= Spain in the Eurovision Song Contest 1979 =

- Eurovision Song Contest 1979
- Participating broadcaster: Televisión Española (TVE)
- Country: Spain
- Selection process: Internal selection
- Announcement date: Artist: 29 January 1979

Competing entry
- Song: "Su canción"
- Artist: Betty Missiego
- Songwriter: Fernando Moreno

Placement
- Final result: 2nd, 116 points

Participation chronology

Spain was represented at the Eurovision Song Contest 1979 with the song "Su canción", written by Fernando Moreno, and performed by Betty Missiego. The Spanish participating broadcaster, Televisión Española (TVE), internally selected its entry for the contest. The song, performed in position 19, placed second out of nineteen competing entries with 116 points.

== Before Eurovision ==
Televisión Española (TVE) assembled a jury of 29 members –27 specialized critics from radio and newspaper media and two representatives of the network–, which locked up on 29 January 1979 in Prado del Rey, internally selected among 27 candidate songs "Su canción" performed by Betty Missiego as its entry for the Eurovision Song Contest 1979. The song was written by Fernando Moreno. The title of the song, the songwriter, and the performer were announced that same day. Among the entries in the selection were: "Bang Bang Bang" performed by Victoria Abril, "Ella-A-A" by Jorge y Manolo, "Guitarra" by Pecos, "Poeta" by Emilio José, "Olé María" by María Ostiz, "Agradable secreto, peligroso juego" by Laureano Solo, "Los borrachos somos gente inquebrantables", and other songs by Gloria and Santa Bárbara. In the last of the four rounds of voting, "Su canción" won with 26 votes, beating "Ella-A-A" which got 2 votes and "Bang Bang Bang" which got 1 vote.

The preview music video of "Su canción" that was distributed to the other participating broadcasters was filmed on location in Palma de Mallorca.

== At Eurovision ==
On 31 March 1979, the Eurovision Song Contest was held at the International Convention Center in Jerusalem hosted by the Israeli Broadcasting Authority (IBA), and broadcast live throughout the continent. Missiego performed "Su canción" as the last song of the evening, the 19th in the running order, following Austria. She was accompanied on stage by four children as backup singers: Javier Glaria, Alexis Carmona, Beatriz Carmona, and Rosalía Rodríguez. José Luis Navarro conducted the event's live orchestra in the performance of the Spanish entry. At the close of voting "Su canción" had received 116 points, placing 2nd.

TVE broadcast the contest in Spain on TVE 1 with commentary by Miguel de los Santos. Before the event, TVE aired a talk show hosted by Manuel Almendros introducing the Spanish jury, which continued after the contest commenting on the results.

=== Voting ===
TVE assembled a jury panel with ten members. The following members comprised the Spanish jury:

- María del Carmen Díaz – civil servant
- Fuencis García – psychologist
- Felisa Olasagarre – stewardess
- Fernando Sancho – actor
- Adolfo Arlés – model
- Antonio Romero – sailing instructor
- Rosa María Samblas – student
- Constanza Valverde – student
- Antonio Páez – runner
- Lina Traspaderne – decorator
- Alicia Puerto – nurse

The jury was chaired by Arturo Pérez, who was the head of the TVE press office. The jury awarded its maximum of 12 points to Germany.

Points awarded to Spain
Score	Country
12 points	Belgium; Germany; Italy; Switzerland
10 points	Austria; Luxembourg; Netherlands
8 points	France; Israel
7 points	Sweden
6 points	Greece
5 points	United Kingdom
4 points	
3 points	Denmark
2 points	
1 point	Norway

Points awarded by Spain
Score	Country
12 points	Germany
10 points	Israel
8 points	Italy
7 points	Greece
6 points	Portugal
5 points	United Kingdom
4 points	Denmark
3 points	France
2 points	Monaco
1 point	Norway
