= United Kingdom in the Eurovision Song Contest 1979 =

- Eurovision Song Contest 1979
- Participating broadcaster: British Broadcasting Corporation (BBC)
- Country: United Kingdom
- Selection process: A Song for Europe 1979
- Selection date: 9 March 1979

Competing entry
- Song: "Mary Ann"
- Artist: Black Lace
- Songwriter: Peter Morris

Placement
- Final result: 7th, 73 points

Participation chronology

The United Kingdom was represented at the Eurovision Song Contest 1979 with the song "Mary Ann", written by Peter Morris, and performed by the band Black Lace. The British participating broadcaster, the British Broadcasting Corporation (BBC), selected its entry through a national final.

== Before Eurovision ==
=== A Song for Europe 1979 ===
A Song for Europe 1979 was planned to take place at the Royal Albert Hall in London on 8 March 1979.

After a day's rehearsals a strike by the BBC technicians stopped the show about an hour before transmission. Audio recordings of the songs were voted on by 14 regional juries: Bristol, Bangor, Leeds, Norwich, Newcastle, Aberdeen, Birmingham, Belfast, Cardiff, Plymouth, Glasgow, Southampton, and London. The jury in Manchester could not be contacted and since the winner had a more than 12 point winning margin, their scores were not included. This led to an immaterial tie for second place. The Manchester votes were later verified and added to the scores, demoting the song "Call My Name" down to third place. The following day, the 12 songs were broadcast on Terry Wogan's Radio 2 show and a recap of the top places, plus an interview with the winners took place on the BBC TV Show Nationwide the same evening.

A Song for Europe 1979 – 8 March 1979
R/O	Artist	Song	Songwriter(s)	Points	Place
1	Black Lace	"Mary Ann"	Peter Morris	132	1
2	Lynda Virtu	"You Are My Life"	Tony Colton; Jean Roussel	82	8
3	Ipswich	"Who Put the Shine on Our Shoes?"	Nola York	90	5
4	Herbie Flowers and the Daisies	"Mr Moonlight"	Herbie Flowers; Doreen Chanter	90	5
5	M Squad	"Miss Caroline Newley"	Adrian Baker	44	11
6	Eleanor Keenan	"Call My Name"	Roger Whittaker	109	3
7	Guys 'n' Dolls	"How Do You Mend a Broken Heart?"	Ben Findon; Michael Myers	56	10
8	Linda Kendrick	"All I Needed Was Your Love"	Doug Taylor	33	12
9	Monte Carlo	"Home Again (Living With You)"	David Knowles	83	7
10	Sal Davis	"Let It All Go"	Paul Curtis	77	9
11	The Nolan Sisters	"Harry, My Honolulu Lover"	Terry Bradford	101	4
12	Kim Clark	"Fantasy"	Richard Gillinson	117	2

== At Eurovision ==
Black Lace were the winners of A Song for Europe 1979 with "Mary Ann" and went on to place 7th at the 1979 Eurovision Song Contest in Jerusalem.

This was also the only Eurovision between 1972 and 2008 in which Terry Wogan did not provide either the television or radio commentary. Wogan had originally been scheduled to provide the television commentary but opted out of going to Israel following comments he made of the 1978 winner "A-Ba-Ni-Bi" sounding like "I Wanna Be a Polar Bear". Instead his Radio 2 colleague John Dunn provided the television commentary. Ray Moore provided the radio commentary on both BBC Radio 1 and Radio 2.

=== Voting ===
Points awarded to the United Kingdom
Score	Country
12 points	
10 points	Denmark; Norway
8 points	Germany; Italy
7 points	Ireland; Finland
6 points	Austria
5 points	Netherlands; Spain
4 points	Portugal
3 points	
2 points	Switzerland
1 point	Monaco

Points awarded by the United Kingdom
Score	Country
12 points	Israel
10 points	Luxembourg
8 points	Germany
7 points	Norway
6 points	France
5 points	Spain
4 points	Ireland
3 points	Denmark
2 points	Belgium
1 point	Austria
