= Norway in the Eurovision Song Contest 1979 =

- Eurovision Song Contest 1979
- Participating broadcaster: Norsk rikskringkasting (NRK)
- Country: Norway
- Selection process: Melodi Grand Prix 1979
- Selection date: 10 February 1979

Competing entry
- Song: "Oliver"
- Artist: Anita Skorgan
- Songwriters: Anita Skorgan; Philip Kruse

Placement
- Final result: 11th, 57 points

Participation chronology

Norway was represented at the Eurovision Song Contest 1979 with the song "Oliver", composed by Anita Skorgan, with lyrics by Philip Kruse, and performed by Skorgan herself. The Norwegian participating broadcaster, Norsk rikskringkasting (NRK), selected its entry through the Melodi Grand Prix 1979. This was the second of three Eurovision appearances (and a further uncredited fourth) for Skorgan.

== Before Eurovision ==
=== Melodi Grand Prix 1979 ===
Norsk rikskringkasting (NRK) held the Melodi Grand Prix 1979 final round at its studios in Oslo, hosted by Egil Teige. No live audience was present, nor was there a stage with scenery or props –only the orchestra and contestants, who were permitted to wear only simple clothing. The orchestra was conducted by Norwegian composer Egil Monn-Inversen.

A total of 331 entries were received, and of them eight entries were selected. The jury consisted of the musicians Kjell Karlsen, Fred Nøddelund and Øyvind Westby.

Eight songs were presented in the final round, with the winner chosen by an expert jury which included Kirsti Sparboe, who represented Norway in 1965, 1967, and 1969, and Norwegian Eurovision conductors Carsten Klouman and Sigurd Jansen. Future Eurovision winner Hanne Krogh also took part.

Final – 10 February 1979
R/O	Artist	Song	Songwriters(s)	Points	Place
1	Inger Lise Rypdal	"Så lenge du er hos meg"	Torbjørn Daleng, Gunnar Jørstad	24	3
2	Ingrid Elisabeth Johansen	"Boogie Bill"	Petter Hurlen	17	4
3	Gudny Aspaas	"Sang uten ord"	Inge Christofersen	6	7
4	Hanne Krogh	"Når vi er barn"	Svein Hundsnes	2	8
5	Tore Johansen	"Ved en grammofon"	Gunnar Hordvik, Svein Strugstad	7	6
6	Anne Lise Gjøstøl	"Hva er vitsen med en sang"	Petter Hurlen	30	2
7	Maj-Britt Andersen	"Jeg ringer deg i kveld"	Kristian Lindeman	12	5
8	Anita Skorgan	"Oliver"	Anita Skorgan, Philip Kruse	37	1

Detailed Jury Votes
R/O	Song	S. Jansen	J. Helseth	T. Thue	L. Mylius	E. Pedersen	C. Klouman	A. Johansen	S. Bergh	K. Sparboe	Total
1	"Så lenge du er hos meg"	3		3	4	3	2	3	1	5	24
2	"Boogie Bill"	2		4	2	4		2	3		17
3	"Sang uten ord"	1			1		1			3	6
4	"Når vi er barn"		1	1							2
5	"Ved en grammofon"		4		3						7
6	"Hva er vitsen med en sang"	5	2	2		2	5	5	5	4	30
7	"Jeg ringer deg i kveld"		3			1	4	1	2	1	12
8	"Oliver"	4	5	5	5	5	3	4	4	2	37

== At Eurovision ==
On the night of the final Skorgan performed 16th in the running order, following Sweden and preceding the United Kingdom. At the close of voting "Oliver" had picked up 57 points, placing Norway 11th of the 19 entries. The Norwegian jury awarded its 12 points to contest winners Israel.

=== Voting ===
Points awarded to Norway
Score	Country
12 points	
10 points	Sweden
8 points	Belgium; Ireland
7 points	United Kingdom
6 points	Monaco; Netherlands
5 points	
4 points	
3 points	Italy; Portugal
2 points	Israel; Luxembourg
1 point	Austria; Spain

Points awarded by Norway
Score	Country
12 points	Israel
10 points	United Kingdom
8 points	Switzerland
7 points	France
6 points	Portugal
5 points	Ireland
4 points	Netherlands
3 points	Italy
2 points	Luxembourg
1 point	Spain
