= Portugal in the Eurovision Song Contest 1979 =

- Eurovision Song Contest 1979
- Participating broadcaster: Radiotelevisão Portuguesa (RTP)
- Country: Portugal
- Selection process: Festival RTP da Canção 1979
- Selection date: 24 February 1979

Competing entry
- Song: "Sobe, sobe, balão sobe"
- Artist: Manuela Bravo
- Songwriter: Carlos Nóbrega e Sousa

Placement
- Final result: 9th, 64 points

Participation chronology

Portugal was represented at the Eurovision Song Contest 1979 with the song "Sobe, sobe, balão sobe", written by Carlos Nóbrega e Sousa, and performed by Manuela Bravo. The Portuguese participating broadcaster, Radiotelevisão Portuguesa (RTP), selected its entry at the Festival RTP da Canção 1979.

== Before Eurovision ==
=== Festival RTP da Canção 1979 ===
The logo of Festival RTP da Canção 1979

Radiotelevisão Portuguesa (RTP) held the Festival RTP da Canção 1979 at the Cinema Monumental in Lisbon, hosted by José Fialho Gouveia and Manuela Moura Guedes. The musical director was Thilo Krasmann.

Three semi-finals held on 3, 10, and 17 February narrowed the final selection from 27 eligible songs to nine; the top three winners in each of the three heats were chosen by a jury composed of 5 elements, each of them would have to score each song from 1 to 5 points depending on their analysis of each of the themes in the competition. The regional juries came back, with twenty-two regional juries throughout Portugal, the Azores and the Madeira Islands picking the winner. Each district could vote for each song from zero to 10 points.

The final was held on 23 February, and the winning entry was "Sobe, sobe, balão sobe", written by Carlos Nóbrega e Sousa and performed by Manuela Bravo.

Semi-final 1 – 3 February 1979
R/O	Artist	Song	Conductor	Votes	Place	Result
1	Samuel	"Recados da ilha"	Pedro Osório	17	4	—N/a
2	Edmundo Falé	"País das maravilhas"	Shegundo Galarza	10	8	—N/a
3	Paula Abril	"Bergantim"	Jorge Machado	4	9	—N/a
4	Samuel	"O fogo desta idade"	Pedro Osório	14	5	—N/a
5	Gonzaga Coutinho	"Tema para um homem só"	Thilo Krasmann	19	2	Qualified
6	Carlos Alberto Moniz & Maria do Amparo	"A outra banda"	Pedro Osório	11	7	—N/a
7	SARL	"Uma canção comercial"	Pedro Osório	20	1	Qualified
8	Carlos Alberto Vidal	"Olha como é linda a manhã"	Mike Sergeant	13	6	—N/a
9	Concha	"Qualquer dia, quem diria"	Javier Iturralda	19	2	Qualified

Semi-final 2 – 10 February 1979
R/O	Artist	Song	Conductor	Votes	Place	Result
1	Luís Arriaga	"A tua imagem"	Pedro Osório	12	7	—N/a
2	Isabel Soares	"Cantiga de amor"	Luís Duarte	10	8	—N/a
3	Gabriela Schaaf	"Eu só quero"	Jorge Machado	20	2	Qualified
4	Jorge Coutinho	"Bom dia quotidiano"	Eduardo Paes Mamede	8	9	—N/a
5	João Henrique	"Para te ver passar"	Shegundo Galarza	14	5	—N/a
6	Tozé Brito	"Novo canto português"	Mike Sergeant	19	3	Qualified
7	Alexandra	"Zé brasileiro, português de Braga"	Fernando Correia Martins	18	4	—N/a
8	Teresa Silva Carvalho	"Cantemos até ser dia"	Pedro Osório	21	1	Qualified
9	Valério Silva	"Canção do realejo"	Fernando Correia Martins	14	5	—N/a

Semi-final 3 – 17 February 1979
R/O	Artist	Song	Conductor	Votes	Place	Result
1	Carlos Alberto Moniz & Maria do Amparo	"Camponês dos campos de água"	Pedro Osório	15	4	—N/a
2	Edmundo Falé	"Canções em flor"	Shegundo Galarza	11	8	—N/a
3	Florência	"O comboio do tua"	Shegundo Galarza	18	1	Qualified
4	Grupo Gente	"Quatro letras"	José Calvário	13	6	—N/a
5	Teresa Silva Carvalho	"Maria, Maria"	Pedro Osório	13	6	—N/a
6	Cândida Branca Flor	"A nossa história de amor"	Mike Sergeant	11	9	—N/a
7	Manuel José Soares	"Quando chego a casa"	Luís Duarte	16	3	Qualified
8	Cocktail	"Amanhã virás"	Mike Sergeant	14	5	—N/a
9	Manuela Bravo	"Sobe, sobe, balão sobe"	Fernando Correia Martins	17	2	Qualified

Final – 23 February 1979
R/O	Artist	Song	Conductor	Votes	Place
1	Gonzaga Coutinho	"Tema para um homem só"	Thilo Krasmann	102	5
2	SARL	"Uma canção comercial"	Pedro Osório	123	3
3	Concha	"Qualquer dia, quem diria"	Javier Iturralda	78	6
4	Gabriela Schaaf	"Eu só quero"	Jorge Machado	132	2
5	Tozé Brito	"Novo canto português"	Mike Sergeant	110	4
6	Teresa Silva Carvalho	"Cantemos até ser dia"	Pedro Osório	52	9
7	Florência	"O comboio do tua"	Shegundo Galarza	63	8
8	Manuel José Soares	"Quando chego a casa"	Luís Duarte	76	7
9	Manuela Bravo	"Sobe, sobe, balão sobe"	Fernando Correia Martins	149	1

Detailed Distrital Jury Votes
R/O	Angra do Heroísmo	Aveiro	Beja	Braga	Bragança	Castelo Branco	Coimbra	Évora	Faro	Funchal	Guarda	Horta	Leiria	Lisbon	Ponta Delgada	Portalegre	Porto	Santarém	Setúbal	Viana do Castelo	Vila Real	Viseu	Total
1	5	5		4	8	7	4	4	3	3	5	4	7	4	10	4	4	3	5	4	5	4	102
2		6	6	7	6	3	4	7	6	2	8	5	10	1	10	10	2	5	10	6		9	123
3		3	4	2	3	5	2	4	1	1	4	2	4	10		6	5	2	5	3	8	4	78
4		7	10	6	7	9	10	4	4	8	3	2	6	9		10	8	4	6	9	2	8	132
5		8		4	4	7	4	6	7	8	7	10		1	3	2	2	7	9	9	6	6	110
6		2	2	3	2	3	8	2	5	1	3	2				4	2	3	5	3		2	52
7		2		3	3	2	4	5	3	2	7	3				3	3	4	7		7	5	63
8		3		2	4	5	4	4	7	4	6	4	4	1		4	3	3	8	3	3	3	76
9	5	8		8	6	10	9	9	8	3	10	4	1	3	8	10	9	9	9		10	10	149

== At Eurovision ==
Manuela Bravo was the first performer on the night of the contest, preceding Italy. At the close of the voting the song had received 64 points, placing 9th in a field of 19 competing countries. It was the highest ranking Portugal had received since 1972.

=== Voting ===
Points awarded to Portugal
Score	Country
12 points	
10 points	France
8 points	
7 points	Austria
6 points	Italy; Norway; Spain
5 points	Belgium; Monaco
4 points	Germany; Switzerland
3 points	Luxembourg; Netherlands; Sweden
2 points	Finland
1 point	

Points awarded by Portugal
Score	Country
12 points	Israel
10 points	Greece
8 points	Italy
7 points	Luxembourg
6 points	France
5 points	Ireland
4 points	United Kingdom
3 points	Norway
2 points	Germany
1 point	Monaco
