= France in the Eurovision Song Contest 1979 =

- Eurovision Song Contest 1979
- Participating broadcaster: Télévision Française 1 (TF1)
- Country: France
- Selection process: Internal selection

Competing entry
- Song: "Je suis l'enfant soleil"
- Artist: Anne Marie David
- Songwriters: Hubert Giraud; Eddy Marnay

Placement
- Final result: 3rd, 106 points

Participation chronology

France was represented at the Eurovision Song Contest 1979 with the song "Je suis l'enfant soleil", composed by Hubert Giraud, with lyrics by Eddy Marnay, and performed by Anne Marie David. The French participating broadcaster, Télévision Française 1 (TF1), internally selected its entry for the contest.

== Before Eurovision ==
=== Internal selection ===
Télévision Française 1 (TF1) was going to hold the French national final, Concours de la Chanson Française pour l'Eurovision 1979, on 4 March 1979 at its studios in Paris, but the Société Française de Production, the French film technicians' union, went on strike, barring the semi-finals from airing and the finals from being taped at all. A professional jury picked the winner out of a pool of 14 semi-finalists.

The winning entry was "Je suis l'enfant soleil", performed by Anne Marie David and composed by Eddy Marnay with lyrics by Hubert Giraud. Despite the strike, Anne Marie David's semi-final performance was allowed to be shown during Preview Week.

1st semi-final - 18 February 1979
R/O	Artist	Song	Points	Place
1	Renaud Siry	"Juste une mélodie"	—N/a	
2	Darras et Désumeur	"Arlequin"	—N/a	
3	Christy Caro	"L'hiver est le plus chaud"	—N/a	
4	Elsa Litton	"Cette nuit-là"	—N/a	
5	Chorus	"Je vole sur la musique"	—N/a	
6	Anne-Marie David	"Je suis l'enfant soleil"	—N/a	1
7	Michel Démétriadès	"Prends la vie comme elle vient"	—N/a	

2nd semi-final - 25 February 1979
R/O	Artist	Song	Points	Place
1	Judith Lay	"Enfants de la musique"	—N/a	
2	Richard Lory	"Un vent de folie"	—N/a	
3	Francine Aliona	"Danse, allez danse"	—N/a	
4	Paul et Julie B.	"Retour aux années folles"	—N/a	
5	Patrick Loubié	"Bravo, tant pis"	—N/a	
6	Jean-Noël Dupré	"On est tous pareils"	—N/a	
7	Nadine Douteau	"Un jour tu trouveras"	—N/a	

== At Eurovision ==
Anne Marie David performed eleventh on the night of the contest, following Israel and preceding Belgium. At the close of the voting the song had received 106 points, placing 3rd in a field of 19 competing countries.

=== Voting ===
Points awarded to France
Score	Country
12 points	Luxembourg; Netherlands
10 points	Italy; Monaco; Switzerland
8 points	Greece
7 points	Norway
6 points	Belgium; Portugal; United Kingdom
5 points	Austria; Israel; Sweden
4 points	
3 points	Spain
2 points	
1 point	Finland

Points awarded by France
Score	Country
12 points	Germany
10 points	Portugal
8 points	Spain
7 points	Switzerland
6 points	Denmark
5 points	Finland
4 points	Greece
3 points	Monaco
2 points	Luxembourg
1 point	Israel
