= Peter, Sue and Marc =

1970s Swiss music group

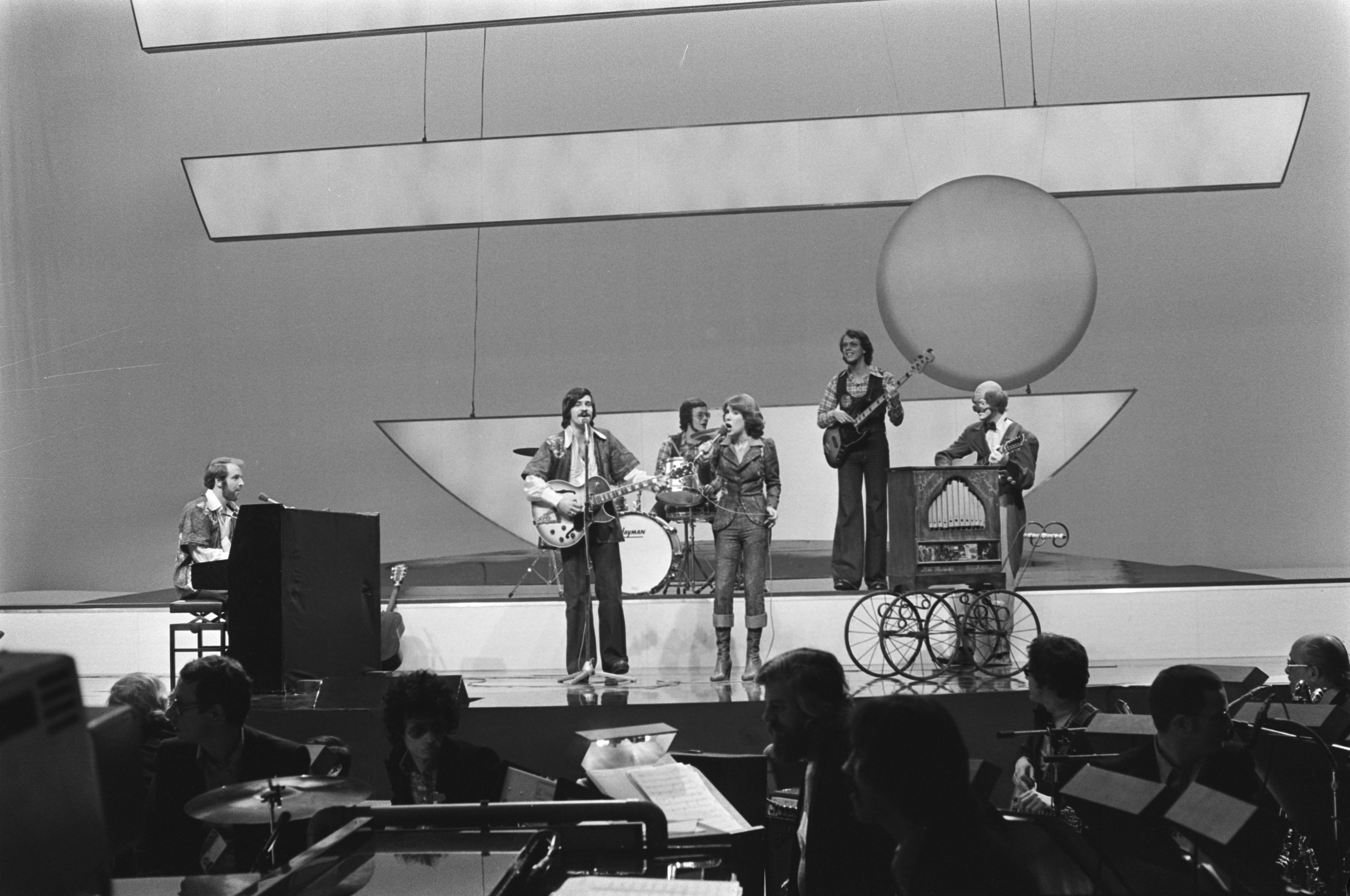
Peter, Sue and Marc at the Eurovision Song Contest 1976

Peter, Sue and Marc were a Swiss music group from Bern, consisting of Peter Reber (born 1949, vocals / piano / guitar), Sue Schell (born 1950 in New York, vocals), and Marc Dietrich (born 1948, vocals / guitar). They represented Switzerland at the Eurovision Song Contest four times, singing in four languages: French in 1971 with "Les Illusions de nos vingt ans", English in 1976 with "Djambo, Djambo", German in 1979 with "Trödler und Co", and Italian in 1981 with "Io senza te", which they also published in German. They sold over two million records in Switzerland. They held concerts in many countries including Germany, Austria, and Japan. Their greatest hit was "Cindy" in 1976 (it was released in South Africa in 1978, where it became a hit, peaking at number 3 on the charts in November of that year). The song "Birds of paradise" became a hit in Slovakia in 2006. Initially the song was played at the funeral of 42 military plane crash victims. Following that people flooded radio stations across the country with requests for this song.

During their career, Peter Sue and Marc made many other attempts to sing at Eurovision. They came third in the 1973 Swiss national final with "Es kommt ein Tag". In 1974, they again missed out on a place, this time with the song "Frei". 1975 saw them finish in second place in the Swiss national final with "Lève-toi le soleil". In 1978, they took part in the German national final, and their entry, "Charlie Chaplin", placed third. In 1987, Dietrich attempted to represent Switzerland solo with the song "Nostradamus", finishing second behind Carol Rich.

In addition to his participations alongside Schell and Dietrich, Reber also composed, co-wrote, and conducted the 1980 Swiss entry, "Cinéma" performed by Paola del Medico. It also makes him one of a few performers to have also participated at Eurovision as a conductor.

Awards and achievements
Preceded by Henri Des with "Retour"	Switzerland in the Eurovision Song Contest; 1971	Succeeded by Veronique Mueller with "C'est la chanson de mon amour"
Preceded by Simone Drexel with "Mikado"	Switzerland in the Eurovision Song Contest; 1976	Succeeded by Pepe Lienhard Band with "Swiss Lady"
Preceded by Carole Vinci with "Vivre"	Switzerland in the Eurovision Song Contest; 1979 (With Pfuri, Gorps and Kniri)	Succeeded by Paola with "Cinéma"
Preceded by Paola with "Cinéma"	Switzerland in the Eurovision Song Contest; 1981	Succeeded by Arlette Zola with "Amour on t'aime"
