= Belgium in the Eurovision Song Contest 1979 =

- Eurovision Song Contest 1979
- Participating broadcaster: Belgische Radio- en Televisieomroep (BRT)
- Country: Belgium
- Selection process: Artist: Internal selection Song: Eurosong 1979
- Selection date: 3 March 1979

Competing entry
- Song: "Hey Nana"
- Artist: Micha Marah
- Songwriters: Charles Dumolin; Guy Beyers

Placement
- Final result: 18th, 5 points

Participation chronology

Belgium was represented at the Eurovision Song Contest 1979 with the song "Hey Nana", composed by Charles Dumolin, with lyrics by Guy Beyers, and performed by Micha Marah. The Belgian participating broadcaster, Flemish Belgische Radio- en Televisieomroep (BRT), selected its entry through a national final, after having previously selected the performer internally.

== Before Eurovision ==
=== Eurosong 1979 ===
==== Format ====
In the summer of 1978, Flemish broadcaster Belgische Radio- en Televisieomroep (BRT) sent invites for a meeting to discuss the format of Eurosong 1979 to eleven artists. These artists were: Della Bosiers, Luk Bral, Lieven Coppieters, Kris De Bruyne, Wim De Craene, Jan De Wilde, Leen Persijn, Raymond van het Groenewoud, Erik Van Neygen, Zjef Vanuytsel, and Johan Verminnen. Four artists accepted the invitation: Della Bosiers, Lieven Coppieters, Kris De Bruyne, and Wim De Craene. The original format was similar to Eurosong 1977. Each of the four artists would have a dedicated programme where they would perform their best known songs as well as new songs for Eurovision, and one song from each programme would qualify to a final round. In the final, each artist would perform their qualified song and the winner would go to the Eurovision Song Contest in Jerusalem.

However, for unknown reasons, BRT scrapped the planned national final, and after an alternate format in which Micha Marah, Sofie and an undetermined singer or group would compete was rejected, it was decided that Marah alone would perform six songs across four semi-finals and a final. In the first three semi-finals, one song was eliminated. In the fourth semi-final, Micha Marah and her team chose one of the three previously eliminated songs to return to the competition and one song was eliminated. In the final, the winning song was chosen from the three remaining songs.

==== Competing entries ====
BRT opened a submission period for songs and six were chosen for the competition. Guy Beyers, a business partner of Micha Marah at the time, chose a selection of songs, from which a committee at BRT chose six songs for Eurosong 1979. All six songs had English lyrics, which meant that Guy Beyers had to translate the songs into Dutch.

Song	Songwriter(s)
"Alleen"	Chris Van Oost, Guy Beyers
"Alles zal zich weer herhalen"	Dirk Stuer, Guy Beyers
"Comment ça va?"	Fred Beekmans, Bob Baelemans, Guy Beyers
"Hey Nana"	Charles Dumolin, Guy Beyers
"Mijn dagboek"	Chris De Wamme, J. G. Callebaut, Guy Beyers
"Mooi prater"	Fred Beekmans, Bob Baelemans, Guy Beyers

==== Semi-finals ====
All four semi-finals were held in the Amerikaans Theater in Brussels and were hosted by Micha Marah and Karel Buts. Francis Bay conducted the BRT Big Band, and Anny Gérard, Joanna Lecomte, and Patricia Maessen provided backing vocals in each semi-final. Each semi-final was split into two parts. In the first part, Micha Marah hosted the show, sang well-known songs, and invited guests onto the show. In the second part, Karel Buts took over hosting duties and Micha Marah performed the competing songs.

The jury was intended to be a 200-member audience jury who give between 1 and 6 points to each song. The BRT Study Service would choose 100 families from which two members from two different generations would attend the programme. However, bad weather conditions on the days of the shows meant that there never were 200 jury members.

Semi-final 1 – 3 February 1979
R/O	Song	Points	Place	Result
1	"Mijn dagboek"	571	3	Advanced
2	"Alleen"	504	5	Advanced
3	"Mooi prater"	454	6	—N/a
4	"Alles zal zich weer herhalen"	549	4	Advanced
5	"Hey Nana"	766	2	Advanced
6	"Comment ça va?"	849	1	Advanced
Guest performers
Dream Express, Bobbejaan Schoepen, Heddy Lester

Semi-final 2 – 10 February 1979
R/O	Song	Points	Place	Result
1	"Alleen"	516	4	Advanced
2	"Alles zal zich weer herhalen"	424	5	Saved
3	"Mijn dagboek"	685	3	Advanced
4	"Hey Nana"	713	2	Advanced
5	"Comment ça va?"	746	1	Advanced
Guest performers
Nicole & Hugo, Hans Flower, Brotherhood of Man

Semi-final 3 – 17 February 1979
R/O	Song	Points	Place	Result
1	"Alleen"	509	4	—N/a
2	"Mijn dagboek"	690	2	Advanced
3	"Hey Nana"	632	3	Advanced
4	"Comment ça va?"	852	1	Advanced
Guest performers
Jacques Raymond, Tonia, Lenny Kuhr

Semi-final 4 – 24 February 1979
R/O	Song	Points	Place	Result
1	"Alles zal zich weer herhalen"	233	4	—N/a
2	"Mijn dagboek"	381	3	Advanced
3	"Hey Nana"	576	2	Advanced
4	"Comment ça va?"	758	1	Advanced
Guest performers
Pierre Rapsat, Pepe Lienhard Band

==== Final ====
The final was held on 3 March 1979 with the three surviving songs, this time voted on by a 20-member jury rather than the public. The jury consisted of five past Eurovision Song Contest participants: Lily Castel, Jacques Raymond, Nicole Josy, Hugo Sigal, and Luc Smets; five representatives of BRT television: Zaki, Herman Meyssen, Ward Bogaert, Jef Bruyninckx, and Guy Helsen; five representatives of BRT radio: Jos Baudewijn, Peter De Groot, Luk De Laat, Paul Verbrugghe, and Frans Feyaerts; and five journalists: Emiel Janssens, Louis Van Raak, Roland Rentmeesters, Jan Van Hemeledonck, and Willy Schuyesmans. The jury voted in the same way as the public, by giving between 1 and 6 points to each song.

Final – 3 March 1979
R/O	Song	Points	Place
1	"Mijn dagboek"	58	3
2	"Hey Nana"	96	1
3	"Comment ça va?"	83	2
Guest performers
Teach-In, Xandra

==== Controversy ====
Micha Marah had made it clear that "Comment ça va?" was her favourite song of the national final and the one she wanted to go to Eurovision with. Micha Marah and her team had been promoting the song up to the national final, with Micha Marah also promoting the song at the MIDEM music fair in 1979. Some jury members from television, radio, and the press were annoyed by Micha Marah's team's control over the national final and decided to give low scores to "Comment ça va?". Some jury members even refused to vote at all for "Comment ça va?" and their votes defaulted to 1 point. Micha Marah was unhappy with the result and had to be pushed onto the stage to reprise "Hey Nana" at the end of the show.

During the reception after the Eurosong 1979 final, guest star Sandra Reemer noted that "Hey Nana" is similar to another song called "Auntie". "Auntie" was a song released in 1972 for the fiftieth anniversary of the BBC, composed by Hans van Hemert and sung by Hildegard Knef, Enrico Macias, Sandra & Andres, Alice Babs, Demis Roussos, and Vicky Leandros. Decibal Music Belgium, the publisher of the two other songs in the final, "Mijn dagboek" and "Comment ça va?", wanted the BRT to disqualify "Hey Nana" and, together with Guy Beyers, wrote a summary proceedings. A judge found the claims to be unfounded and "Hey Nana" went to Eurovision. The group De Terroristen recorded a Dutch version of "Auntie" with parody lyrics of the lawsuit case against "Hey Nana", called "Euro-vieze klucht".

== At Eurovision ==
On the night of the final Marah performed 12th in the running order, following France and preceding Luxembourg. At the close of the voting "Hey Nana" had received just 5 points, placing Belgium joint last (with Austria) of the 19 entries, the fifth time Belgium had found itself at the bottom of the Eurovision scoreboard. The Belgian jury awarded its 12 points to Spain.

"Hey Nana" is noted for lyrics which those who understood Dutch cited as among the most facile and childish ever heard at Eurovision. Marah herself made no secret of her dislike for the song, refusing even to record it, making it one of the very few Eurovision songs never to have been released commercially in its home territory.

Nonetheless, Marah went on to sing "Hey Nana" on a Belgian TV show in 2017. She made a studio recording in 2023.

=== Voting ===
Points awarded to Belgium
Score	Country
12 points	
10 points	
8 points	
7 points	
6 points	
5 points	
4 points	
3 points	
2 points	Denmark; United Kingdom
1 point	Germany

Points awarded by Belgium
Score	Country
12 points	Spain
10 points	Ireland
8 points	Norway
7 points	Denmark
6 points	France
5 points	Portugal
4 points	Germany
3 points	Netherlands
2 points	Israel
1 point	Greece
