= Ina Wolf =

Austrian singer and composer

Ina Wolf (born Christina Ganahl on 9 October 1954 in Lochau, Vorarlberg, and also known as Christina Simon and Anne-Christie) is an Austrian singer and composer.

== Career ==
=== 1970s ===
In the 1970s, Wolf released music under her birth name as well as under the stage names Anne-Christie and Christina Simon. As Christina Simon, she was selected to represent Austria in the Eurovision Song Contest 1979 with the entry "Heute in Jerusalem". The song featured lyrics by André Heller and music by Peter Wolf. The song tied for last place (18th), receiving five points.

=== 1980s ===
Based in the U.S. throughout the 1980s, Ina Wolf was a lyricist on numerous hits by performers such as Chicago, Kenny Loggins, Paul Young, Sergio Mendes, Lou Gramm, Natalie Cole, Pointer Sisters and Nik Kershaw. Arguably her greatest success was co-writing Starship's U.S. number one hit "Sara". She continued to record, with Peter Wolf, in this decade, as Wolf & Wolf and as Vienna.

=== 1990s-present ===
Returning to Austria in 1994, Wolf continued to record (as Ina Wolf) and write music for performers including Preluders, Joana Zimmer and Thomas Anders.

== Discography ==
=== Singles ===
- "Heute in Jerusalem"
- "Jerusalem"
- "Babaya"
- "Boogie-Woogie-Mama"
- "Hirte der Zärtlichkeit"
- “Who’s Johnny”

== Literature ==
- Jan Feddersen: Ein Lied kann eine Brücke sein, Hoffmann und Campe, 2002, (in German).

Preceded by Springtime	Austria in the Eurovision Song Contest; 1979	Succeeded by Blue Danube
