= Switzerland in the Eurovision Song Contest 1979 =

- Eurovision Song Contest 1979
- Participating broadcaster: Swiss Broadcasting Corporation (SRG SSR)
- Country: Switzerland
- Selection process: Concours Eurovision de la Chanson 1979
- Selection date: 27 January 1979

Competing entry
- Song: "Trödler und Co."
- Artist: Peter, Sue, Marc, Pfuri, Gorps and Kniri
- Songwriters: Peter Reber

Placement
- Final result: 10th, 60 points

Participation chronology

Switzerland was represented at the Eurovision Song Contest 1979 with the song "Trödler und Co.", written by Peter Reber, and performed by Peter, Sue, Marc, Pfuri, Gorps, and Kniri. The Swiss participating broadcaster, the Swiss Broadcasting Corporation (SRG SSR), selected its entry for the contest through a national final.

== Before Eurovision ==
=== Concours Eurovision de la Chanson 1979 ===
The Swiss Broadcasting Corporation (SRG SSR) held a national final to select its entry for the Eurovision Song Contest 1979. The broadcaster received 109 total song submissions (50 in French, 35 in German, and 14 in Italian). In late November 1978, an internal jury shortlisted 26 songs before ultimately selecting eight to take part in the selection, with three being performed in German and Italian and two in French. Among the participants were Peter, Sue and Marc— who represented Switzerland in 1971 and 1976 and repeated this in 1981. Biggi Bachmann previously won an internal song contest from Liechtenstein in 1976 which was intended to be a Eurovision selection, but could not enter the contest as the country did not have a member broadcaster of the European Broadcasting Union.

Shortly before the final, "Amour on t'aime" by Alain Morisod and his group, who were drawn to perform as the sixth song, withdrew due to the group's disbandment. The song was resubmitted to the 1982 Swiss national final, where it was performed by Arlette Zola and won.

Swiss German and Romansh broadcaster Schweizer Fernsehen der deutschen und rätoromanischen Schweiz (SF DRS) staged the national final on 28 January 1979 at 21:00 CET in Zürich. It was presented by Christian Heeb, with Peter Jacques conducting the orchestra. Izhar Cohen and the Alphabeta— who won Eurovision for Israel in 1978 — and Cissy Houston made guest appearances.

Participating entries
Broadcaster	Artist(s)	Song	Songwriter(s)		Language
Broadcaster	Artist(s)	Song	Composer	Lyricist	Language
DRS	Biggi Bachmann	"Musik, Musik"	Ambros Baumann	Beat Hirt	German
DRS	Peter, Sue, Marc, Pfuri, Gorps and Kniri	"Trödler und Co."	Peter Reber		German
DRS	Ruby Manila	"Shake Hands"	Ruby Manila	Pierre Studer	German (Note: Contains some words in English)
TSI	Rita Pavone	"Dieci cuori"	Mario Robbiani		Italian
TSI	Salvo Ingrassia	"Senza te"	Ambros Baumann	Salvo Ingrassia	Italian
TSI	Sandro Caroli	"La nostra favola"	Sandro Caroli		Italian
TSR	Groupe Atlas	"Moi je viens d'un pays"	Pierre Alain		French
TSR	~~Alain Morisod Group~~	~~"Amour on t'aime"~~	~~Alain Morisod~~	~~Pierre Alain~~	French

The voting consisted of regional public votes which were sent to the three divisions of SRG SSR (DRS, TSR, TSI: German, French, and Italian speaking, respectively), a press jury, and a jury of music experts. Applications for viewers from Switzerland and Liechtenstein to join the regional juries were sent via postcard until 20 January, and 50 viewers from each canton were randomly selected to cast their votes to their broadcaster divisions via phone call. Additionally, one random voter in the public jury would be drawn to be invited to attend the Eurovision Song Contest as an audience member along with a companion. The selected voter was Yvonne Barmann from Zurich. The winner was the song "Trödler und Co.", composed by Peter Reber and performed by Peter, Sue, Marc, Pfuri, Gorps and Kniri.

Final — 27 January 1979
R/O	Artist(s)	Song	Regional Juries			Press Jury	Expert Jury	Total	Place
R/O	Artist(s)	Song	DRS	TSR	TSI	Press Jury	Expert Jury	Total	Place
1	Biggi Bachmann	"Musik Musik"	4	4	4	1	2	15	6
2	Rita Pavone	"Dieci cuori"	3	3	5	4	6	21	4
3	Groupe Atlas	"Moi je viens d'un pays"	5	8	3	2	5	23	2
4	Salvo Ingrassia	"Senza te"	1	1	2	3	4	11	7
5	Peter, Sue, Marc, Pfuri, Gorps and Kniri	"Trödler und Co."	8	5	8	8	8	37	1
6	Ruby Manila	"Shake Hands"	6	6	1	6	3	22	3
7	Sandro Caroli	"La nostra favola"	2	2	6	5	1	16	5

=== Releases ===
Peter, Sue and Marc and Pfuri Gorps & Kniri first recorded and released "Trödler und Co." in German and English under the title "Second Hand Company" in 1979. In 1998, the song was featured in a CD compilation titled "Concours Eurovision De La Chanson 1956-1998: Schweizer Beiträge", which compiled every Swiss Eurovision entry at the time.

The only other participants who commercially released their songs that performed in the selection were Biggi Bachmann and Ruby Manilla. The full selection has been archived by SRG SSR and is able to be watched online.

== At Eurovision ==
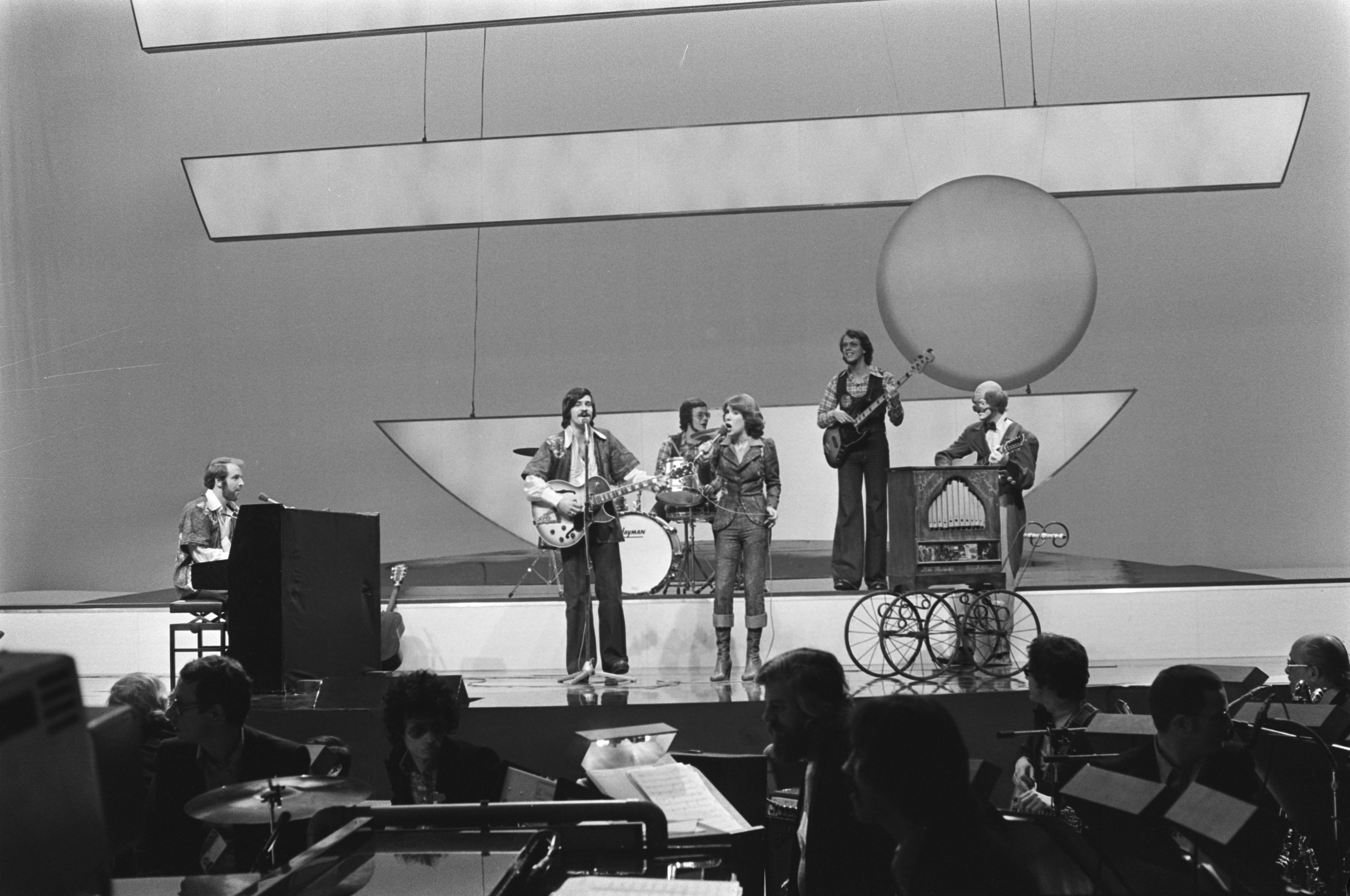
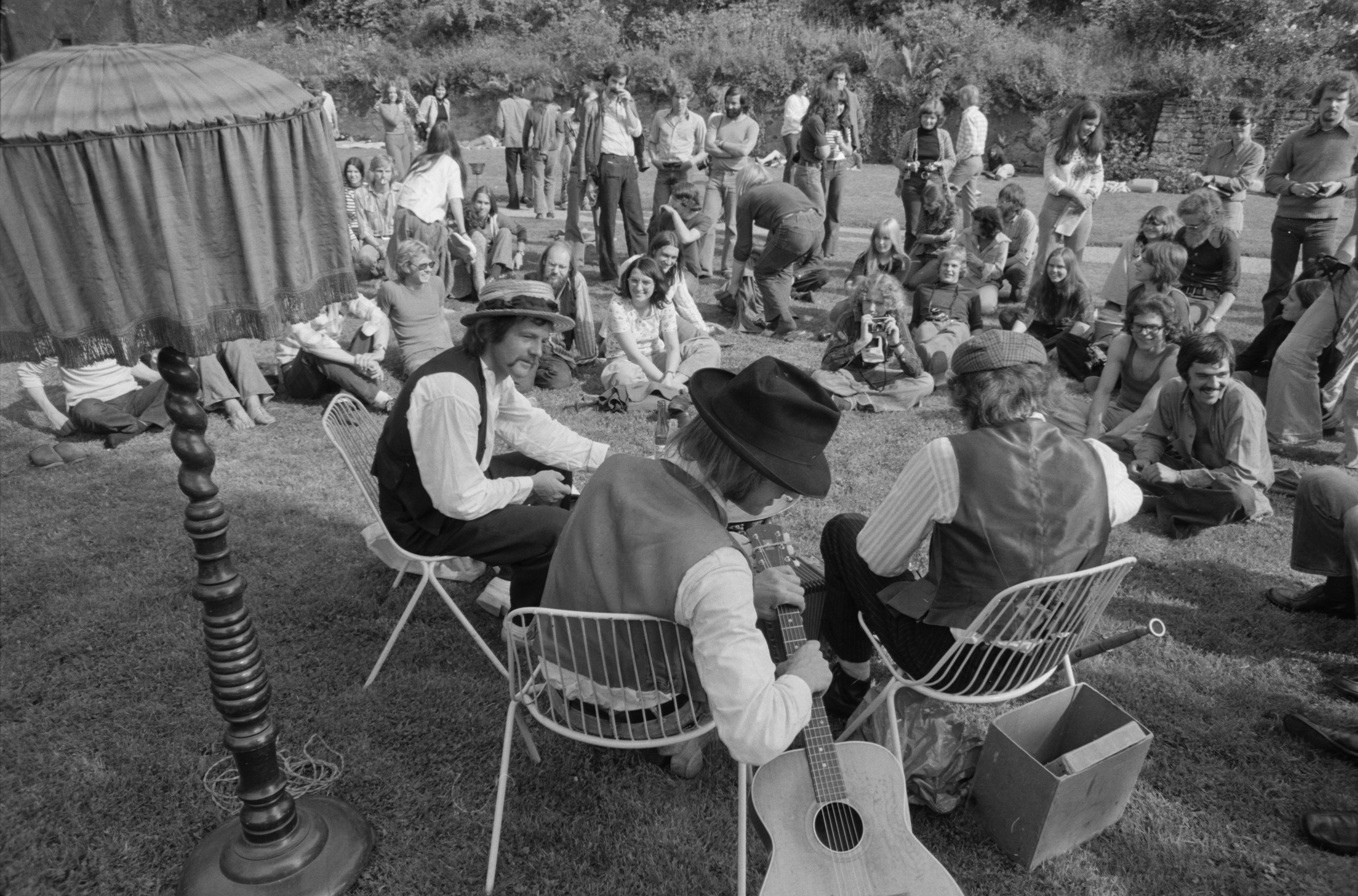
Peter, Sue and Marc (left; pictured in their 1976 participation) and Pfuri, Gorps and Kniri (right) represented Switzerland in Eurovision Song Contest 1979

At the Eurovision Song Contest 1979, held at the International Convention Center in Jerusalem, the Swiss entry was the eighth entry of the night following Greece and preceding Germany. The Swiss conductor at the contest was Rolf Zuckowski. At the close of voting, Switzerland had received 60 points in total; finishing in tenth place out of nineteen countries.

The contest was broadcast on SRG SSR via TV DRS (Note: Broadcast through a second audio programme on TSR) (with commentary from Max Rüeger) in German-speaking Switzerland, TSR (with commentary from Georges Hardy) in Romandy, and TSI and RSI 1 in Ticino.

=== Voting ===
Each participating broadcaster assembled a jury panel with at least eleven members. The jurors awarded 1-8, 10, and 12 points to their top ten songs. Until 1980, the votes were given in the order the awarded songs were performed in, rather than in ascending numerical order.

Points awarded to Switzerland
Score	Country
12 points	Austria
10 points	Finland
8 points	Norway
7 points	Denmark; France; Germany
6 points	
5 points	
4 points	Israel
3 points	
2 points	Greece; Monaco
1 point	Ireland

Points awarded by Switzerland
Score	Country
12 points	Spain
10 points	France
8 points	Finland
7 points	Greece
6 points	Ireland
5 points	Israel
4 points	Portugal
3 points	Luxembourg
2 points	United Kingdom
1 point	Denmark
