= Sweden in the Eurovision Song Contest 1979 =

- Eurovision Song Contest 1979
- Participating broadcaster: Sveriges Radio (SR)
- Country: Sweden
- Selection process: Melodifestivalen 1979
- Selection date: 17 February 1979

Competing entry
- Song: "Satellit"
- Artist: Ted Gärdestad
- Songwriters: Kenneth Gärdestad; Ted Gärdestad

Placement
- Final result: 17th, 8 points

Participation chronology

Sweden was represented at the Eurovision Song Contest 1979 with the song "Satellit", composed by Ted Gärdestad, with lyrics by Kenneth Gärdestad, and performed by Ted Gärdestad himself. The Swedish participating broadcaster, Sveriges Radio (SR), selected its entry through Melodifestivalen 1979.

== Before Eurovision ==
=== Melodifestivalen 1979 ===
Melodifestivalen 1979 was the selection for the 19th song to represent Sweden at the Eurovision Song Contest. It was the 18th time that Sveriges Radio (SR) used this system of picking a song. 452 songs were submitted to SR for the competition. The final was held in the Cirkus in Stockholm on 17 February 1979, presented by Ulf Elfving and was broadcast on TV1 but was not broadcast on radio.

R/O	Artist	Song	Songwriter(s)	Points	Place
1	Ola+3	"Det känns som jag vandrar fram"	Ulf Wahlberg	85	3
2	Tomas and Anders	"Tillsammans"	Tomas Adolphson; Anders Falk	58	6
3	Eva Dahlgren	"Om jag skriver en sång"	Eva Dahlgren	85	3
4	Tomas Ledin	"Det ligger i luften"	Tomas Ledin	96	2
5	Kjell Hansson	"Mer än bara över natten"	Kjell Hansson	59	5
6	Timjan	"En egen fela"	Bengt "Charlie" Hillson; Peter Olsson	39	9
7	Pontus Platin	"Nattens sång"	Patrice Hellberg; Pontus Platin; Susanne Wigforss	44	8
8	Py Bäckman and Py Gang	"Var det här bara början?"	Py Bäckman	45	7
9	Ted Gärdestad	"Satellit"	Ted Gärdestad; Kenneth Gärdestad	105	1
10	Magnus Uggla Band	"Johnny the Rocker"	Johan Langer; Magnus Uggla	22	10

Detailed Votes
R/O	Song	Falun	Gothenburg	Karlstad	Luleå	Malmö	Norrköping	Sundsvall	Umeå	Växjö	Örebro	Stockholm	Total
1	"Det känns som jag vandrar fram"	10	6	6	7	6	4	7	12	7	8	12	85
2	"Tillsammans"	6	3	5	6	10	6	4	8	3	5	2	58
3	"Om jag skriver en sång"	8	12	10	2	4	7	6	10	8	12	6	85
4	"Det ligger i luften"	12	10	12	10	8	10	10	3	6	7	8	96
5	"Mer än bara över natten"	7	5	2	1	3	8	8	7	10	3	5	59
6	"En egen fela"	3	4	3	3	7	2	5	2	1	2	7	39
7	"Nattens sång"	1	8	4	4	5	5	2	4	4	6	1	44
8	"Var det här bara början?"	4	2	8	8	2	3	3	5	2	4	4	45
9	"Satellit"	5	7	7	12	12	12	12	6	12	10	10	105
10	"Johnny the Rocker"	2	1	1	5	1	1	1	1	5	1	3	22

== At Eurovision ==
The contest was held in Jerusalem, and Sweden performed 15th. Gärdestad finished only 17th out of 19, with 8 points.

=== Voting ===
Points awarded to Sweden
Score	Country
12 points	
10 points	
8 points	
7 points	
6 points	Ireland
5 points	
4 points	
3 points	
2 points	
1 point	Greece; Israel

Points awarded by Sweden
Score	Country
12 points	Israel
10 points	Norway
8 points	Ireland
7 points	Spain
6 points	Germany
5 points	France
4 points	Netherlands
3 points	Portugal
2 points	Greece
1 point	Denmark
