= Ireland in the Eurovision Song Contest 1979 =

- Eurovision Song Contest 1979
- Participating broadcaster: Radio Telefís Éireann (RTÉ)
- Country: Ireland
- Selection process: National Song Contest
- Selection date: 4 February 1979

Competing entry
- Song: "Happy Man"
- Artist: Cathal Dunne
- Songwriter: Cathal Dunne

Placement
- Final result: 5th, 80 points

Participation chronology

Ireland was represented at the Eurovision Song Contest 1979 with the song "Happy Man", written and performed by Cathal Dunne. The Irish participating broadcaster, Radio Telefís Éireann (RTÉ), selected its entry through a national final.

== Before Eurovision ==
=== National final ===
Radio Telefís Éireann (RTÉ) held the fifteenth edition of the National Song Contest on 4 February 1979 in Dublin, broadcast on RTÉ 1 and hosted by Mike Murphy. The winner, which was decided by ten regional juries throughout Ireland, was Cathal Dunne, who previously competed in the 1976 National Song Contest, but came 4th, losing out to Red Hurley who performed the song "When".

R/O	Artist	Song	Points	Place
1	Tweed	"No Restrictions"	4	5
2	Johnny Logan	"Angie"	15	3
3	Anderson	"Goodbye"	3	6
4	The Memories	"The Main Attraction"	13	4
5	Red Hurley and Tina	"Hiding Behind Our Smile"	0	8
6	Cathal Dunne	"Happy Man"	36	1
7	Catriona Walsh	"Superstar"	3	6
8	The Miami Showband	"Too Much Is Going On"	26	2

== At Eurovision ==
Ireland performed 4th in the startfield and finished 5th with 80 points.

=== Voting ===
Points awarded to Ireland
Score	Country
12 points	
10 points	Belgium; Greece
8 points	Sweden
7 points	Luxembourg
6 points	Finland; Germany; Switzerland
5 points	Denmark; Italy; Norway; Portugal
4 points	United Kingdom
3 points	Israel
2 points	
1 point	

Points awarded by Ireland
Score	Country
12 points	Israel
10 points	Netherlands
8 points	Norway
7 points	United Kingdom
6 points	Sweden
5 points	Germany
4 points	Greece
3 points	Luxembourg
2 points	Denmark
1 point	Switzerland
