= Izhak Graziani =

Israeli music conductor (1924–2003)

- יצחק גרציאני
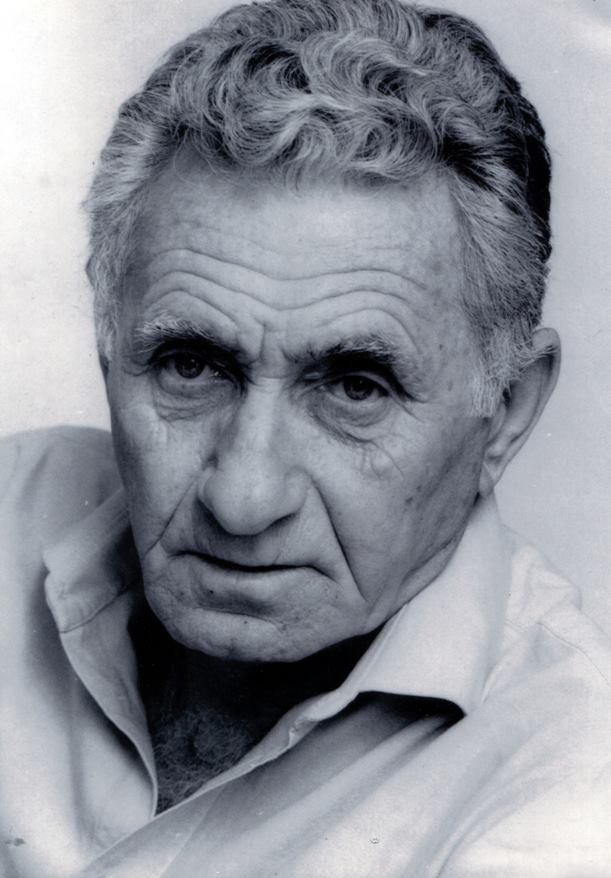
- Born: August 4, 1924; Ruse, Bulgaria
- Died: July 7, 2003 (aged 78); Tel Aviv, Israel
- Military career
- Service years: 1948-1952, 1962-2003
- Rank: Aluf Mishne
- Nickname: Ziko

Izhak Graziani (Hebrew: יצחק גרציאני; August 4, 1924 - July 7, 2003) was an Israeli music conductor.

== Biography ==
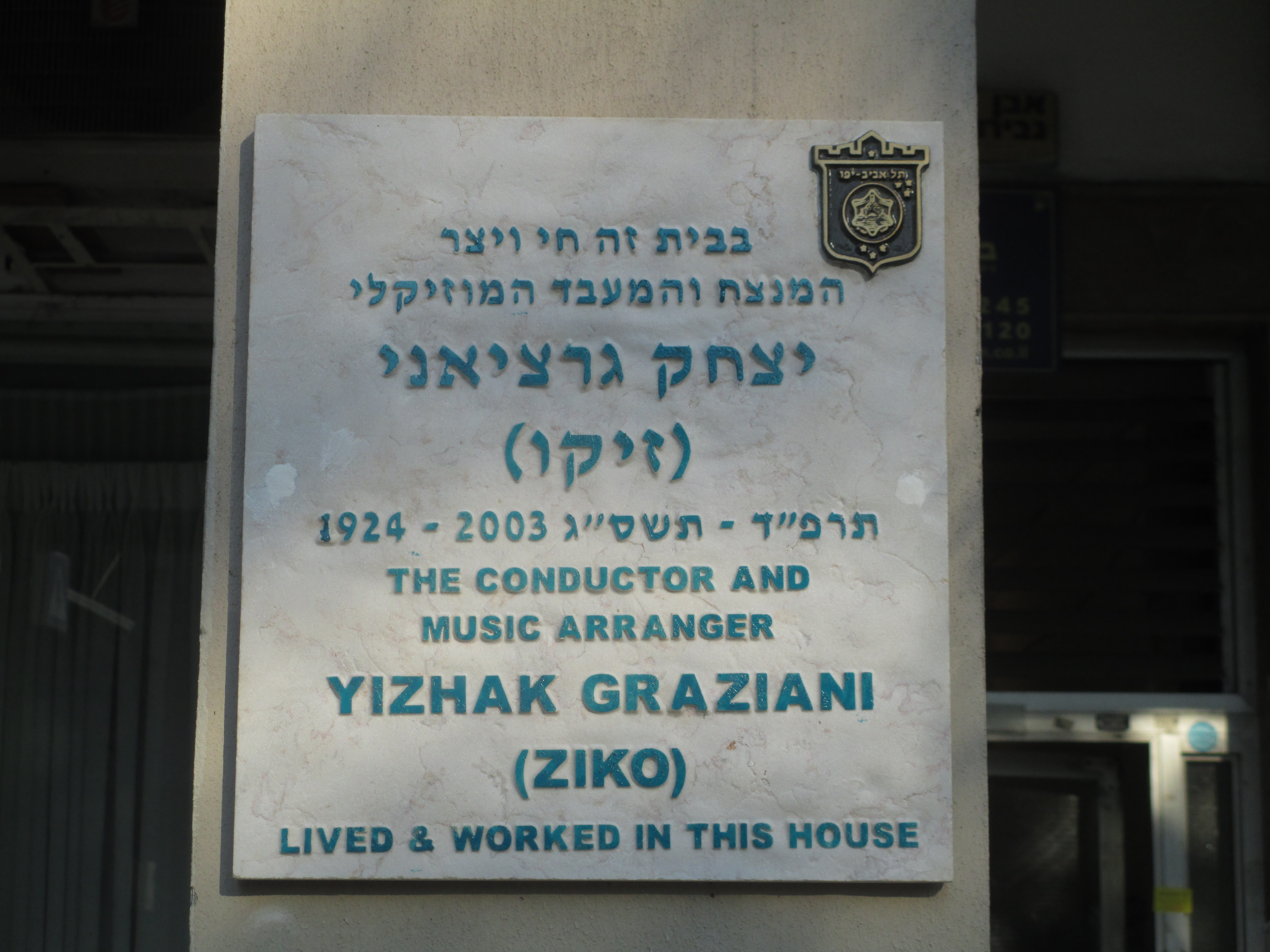
Memorial plaque in Tel Aviv

Izhak ("Ziko") Graziani was born in Ruse, Bulgaria, where he studied music and conducting. In 1948, he immigrated to Israel and joined the IDF Orchestra as a trumpet player.

Graziani died at his home in Ramat Aviv at the age of 79 and was buried in Kiryat Shaul Cemetery. He left behind a wife, Dora, two daughters, grandchildren and great-grandchildren. His daughter, Kochva Gal-Gratziani, is a choir conductor.

A large street is named after him in Sofia. Street were named after him in Kfar Saba, Rosh Ha'Ayin and Tel Aviv

== Music career ==
Graziani played with the orchestra until 1952. In 1960, after the retirement of conductor Shalom Ronli-Riklis, Graziani took his place. He went on to become conductor of the IBA Radio Orchestra (later renamed IBA Radio and TV Orchestra).

Graziani was also music director of the Eurovision Song Contest 1979.

Graziani retired in 2003 and died three months later.

He collaborated with Leonard Bernstein.

== See also ==
- Music of Israel

Preceded by (France) François Rauber	Eurovision Song Contest conductor 1979	Succeeded by (Netherlands) Rogier van Otterloo
