= Sandra Reemer =

Indo-Dutch singer and TV presenter

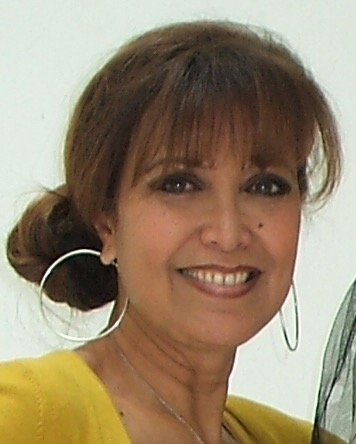
- Reemer in 2010

Background information
- Born: Barbara Alexandra Reemer; 17 October 1950; Bandung, Indonesia
- Died: 6 June 2017 (aged 66) Amsterdam, Netherlands
- Genres: Pop
- Occupations: Singer; television presenter
- Years active: 1963–2017
- Formerly of: Sandra and Andres
- Website: www.sandrareemer.nl

Barbara Alexandra "Sandra" Reemer (17 October 1950 – 6 June 2017) was an Indo-Dutch singer and television presenter. She represented the Netherlands in the Eurovision Song Contest on three occasions, tying with Corry Brokken for most appearances representing the country.

In 1972, she sang the song "Als het om de liefde gaat" in a duet with Dries Holten (she was credited as "Sandra", he was credited as "Andres"); the duo came fourth. In 1976, this time credited under her real name, Reemer performed solo singing the song "The Party's Over", which reached ninth place. In 1979, she was credited as "Xandra" and sang the song "Colorado", which placed twelfth.

She died on 6 June 2017, following a long battle with breast cancer.

== See also ==
- Netherlands in the Eurovision Song Contest 1972
- Netherlands in the Eurovision Song Contest 1976
- Netherlands in the Eurovision Song Contest 1979

Awards and achievements
Preceded by Saskia & Serge with "Tijd"	Netherlands in the Eurovision Song Contest; 1972 (with Andres)	Succeeded by Ben Cramer with "De oude muzikant"
Preceded by Teach-in with "Ding-a-dong"	Netherlands in the Eurovision Song Contest; 1976	Succeeded by Heddy Lester with "De mallemolen"
Preceded by Harmony with "'t Is OK"	Netherlands in the Eurovision Song Contest; 1979	Succeeded by Maggie MacNeal with "Amsterdam"
