= Germany in the Eurovision Song Contest 1979 =

- Eurovision Song Contest 1979
- Participating broadcaster: ARD (Note: Arbeitsgemeinschaft der öffentlich-rechtlichen Rundfunkanstalten der Bundesrepublik Deutschland) – Bayerischer Rundfunk (BR)
- Country: Germany
- Selection process: Ein Lied für Jerusalem
- Selection date: 17 March 1979

Competing entry
- Song: "Dschinghis Khan"
- Artist: Dschinghis Khan
- Songwriters: Ralph Siegel; Bernd Meinunger

Placement
- Final result: 4th, 86 points

Participation chronology

Germany was represented at the Eurovision Song Contest 1979 with the song "Dschinghis Khan", composed by Ralph Siegel, with lyrics by Bernd Meinunger, and performed by the group Dschinghis Khan. The German participating broadcaster on behalf of ARD, Bayerischer Rundfunk (BR), selected their entry through a national final.

== Before Eurovision ==
=== Ein Lied für Jerusalem ===
The German national final to select their entry, Vorentscheid 1979, was held on 17 March at the Rudi-Sedlmayer-Halle in Munich, and was hosted by Carolin Reiber and Thomas Gottschalk.

Twelve songs made it to the national final, which was broadcast by Bayerischer Rundfunk (BR) to ARD broadcasters across West Germany. The winner was decided by a sampling of 500 random West Germans who were meant to symbolize a fair representation of the country's population.

The winning entry was "Dschinghis Khan," performed by Dschinghis Khan and composed by Ralph Siegel with lyrics by Bernd Meinunger.

R/O	Artist	Song	Songrwriter(s)	Votes	Place
1	Tony Holiday	"Zuviel Tequila, zuviel schöne Mädchen"	Wolff-Ekkehardt Stein; Wolfgang Jass	2,807	9
2	Hanne Haller	"Goodbye, Chérie"	Harold Faltermeyer; Stefan Waggershausen	3,009	7
3	Gebrüder Blattschuß	"Ein Blick sagt mehr als jedes Wort"	Ralph Siegel; Kurt Hertha	1,673	12
4	Ingrid Peters	"Du bist nicht frei"	Jean Frankfurter; John Möring	2,894	8
5	Jerry Rix and Linda G. Thompson	"Wochenende"	Günther-Eric Thöner; Erich Offierowski	1,920	11
6	Truck Stop	"Take it easy, altes Haus"	Burkhard Reichling; Claus-Dieter Eckardt	4,394	2
7	Jeanne de Roy	"Was wir aus Liebe tun"	Hans Blum	2,117	10
8	Bernhard Brink	"Madeleine"	Alexander Gordan; Gerhard P. Kämpfe	3,326	6
9	Dschinghis Khan	"Dschinghis Khan"	Ralph Siegel; Bernd Meinunger	4,807	1
10	Paola	"Vogel der Nacht"	Jean Frankfurter; Robert Puschmann	4,127	3
11	Roberto Blanco	"Samba si, Arbeit no"	Horst Hornung; Bernd Meinunger	3,461	4
12	Orlando Riva Sound	"Lady lady lady"	Rainer Pietsch; Anthony Monn	3,336	5

== At Eurovision ==
Dschinghis Khan performed ninth on the night of the contest, following Switzerland and preceding Israel. At the close of the voting the song had received 86 points, placing 4th in a field of 19 competing countries.

The show was watched by 9.82 million viewers in Germany.

=== Voting ===
Points awarded to Germany
Score	Country
12 points	Denmark; France; Monaco; Spain
10 points	
8 points	United Kingdom
7 points	
6 points	Israel; Sweden
5 points	Ireland
4 points	Belgium
3 points	Finland
2 points	Netherlands; Portugal
1 point	Italy; Luxembourg

Points awarded by Germany
Score	Country
12 points	Spain
10 points	Denmark
8 points	United Kingdom
7 points	Switzerland
6 points	Ireland
5 points	Finland
4 points	Portugal
3 points	Netherlands
2 points	Greece
1 point	Belgium
