= Pfuri, Gorps and Kniri =

Swiss folk/blues music group

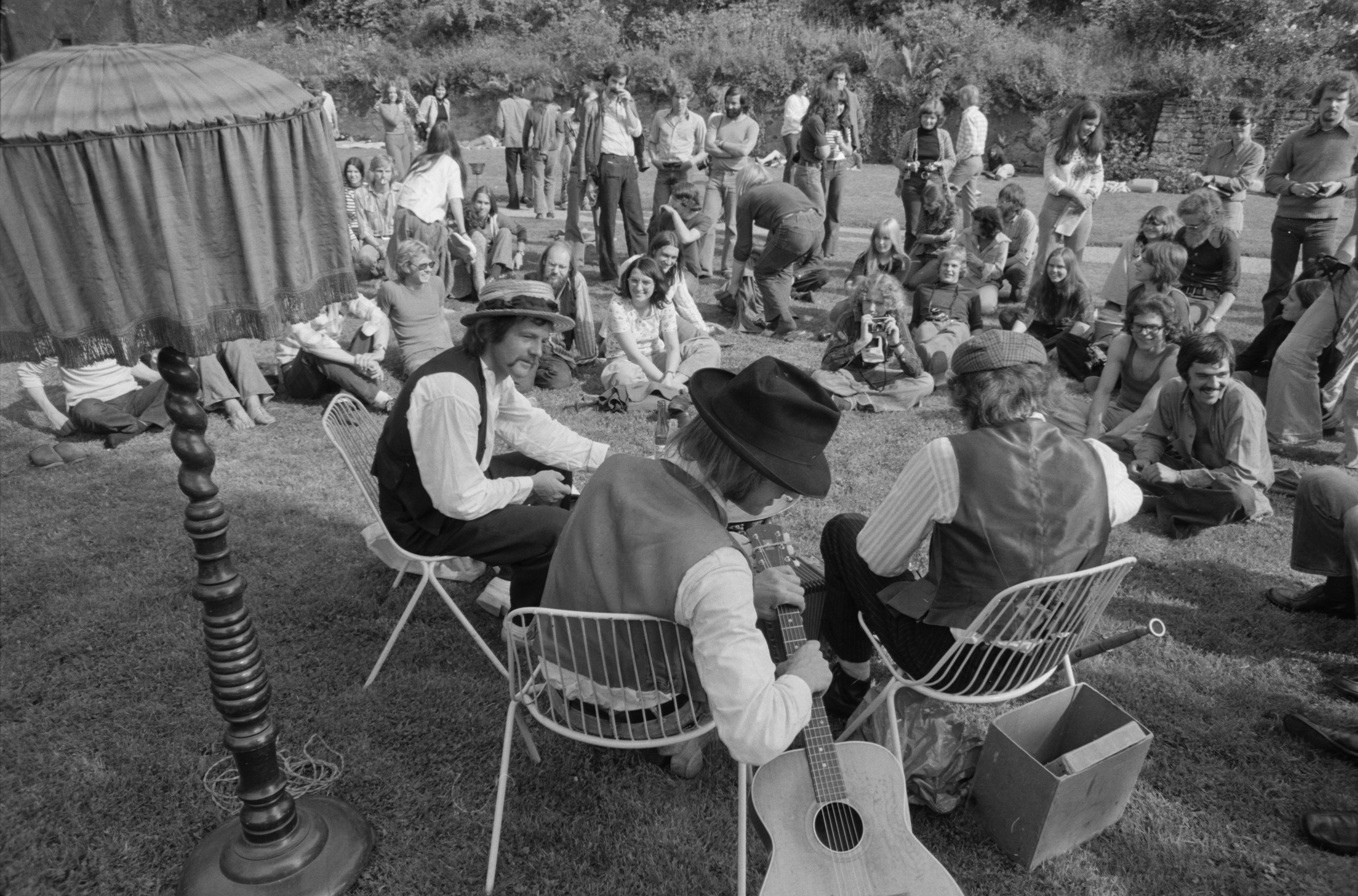
Pfuri, Gorps and Kniri

Pfuri, Gorps and Kniri was a Swiss folk/blues music group consisting of Pfuri Baldenweg (born 26 November 1946), Anthony "Gorps" Fischer (1947–2000) and Peter "Kniri" Knaus (born 3 March 1945 in Aarau). The group took part in the 1978 Roskilde Festival and the 1977 & 1979 Montreux Jazz Festival. In 1979 the trio teamed up with Peter, Sue and Marc at the Eurovision Song Contest 1979 with the song "Trödler und Co." (Second-handers and Co.) they finished 10th place with 60 points.

== Albums ==
- Live, 1975
- Montreux Live, 1977
- Sack’n’Roll Band, 1980

== Singles ==
- Cashbox
- Camping
- Trödler und Co. (with Peter, Sue & Marc)

Awards and achievements
Preceded by Carole Vinci with "Vivre"	Switzerland in the Eurovision Song Contest; 1979 (with Peter, Sue and Marc)	Succeeded by Paola with "Cinéma"
