= Harry van Hoof =

Dutch conductor, composer and music arranger (1943–2024)

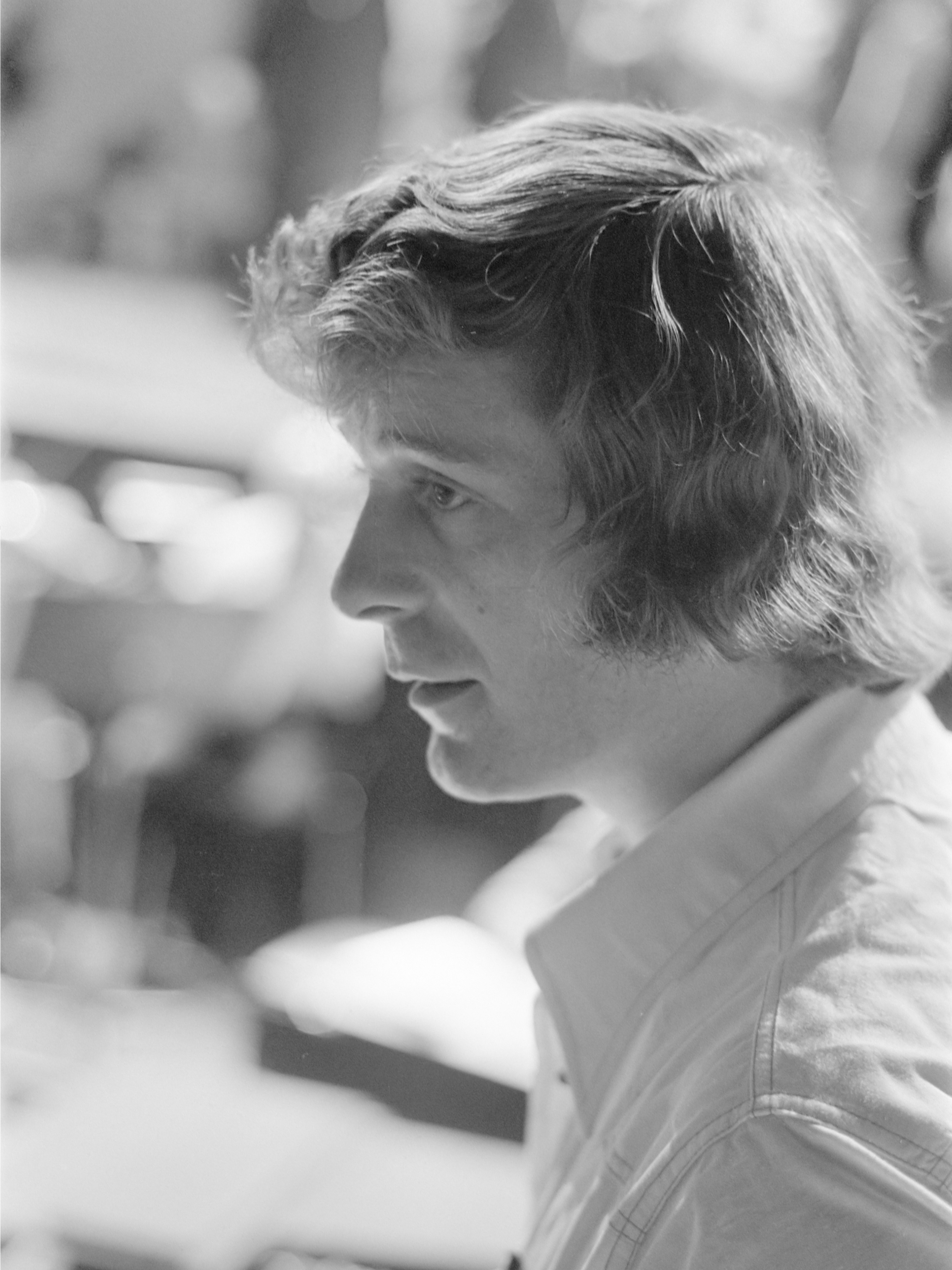
- Van Hoof in 1974
- Born: 16 March 1943; Hilversum, German-occupied Netherlands
- Died: 1 June 2024 (aged 81); Eindhoven, Netherlands
- Occupations: Conductor, composer
- Years active: 1963–2024
- Spouse: Trea Dobbs (m. 1967; div. 1991)

Harry van Hoof (16 March 1943 – 1 June 2024) was a Dutch conductor, composer, and music arranger.

== Life and career ==
Born to Henri René Marie van Hoof (1914–1992) and Maria Martina Joanna Broens (1914–1996). He had two brothers Franciscus and Wilhelmus. Van Hoof wrote many successful productions in his name, he had his own production company and he had his first success as an arranger with "Sofie" by Johnny Lion. Van Hoof conducted Dutch entries on 15 occasions for the Eurovision Song Contest: 1972, 1973, 1974, 1975, 1976, 1977, 1978, 1979, 1986, 1988, 1989, 1990, 1992, 1993, and 1994.

Van Hoof was divorced from singer Trea Dobbs. He died on 1 June 2024, at the age of 81.
