= Micha Marah =

Belgian singer and actress

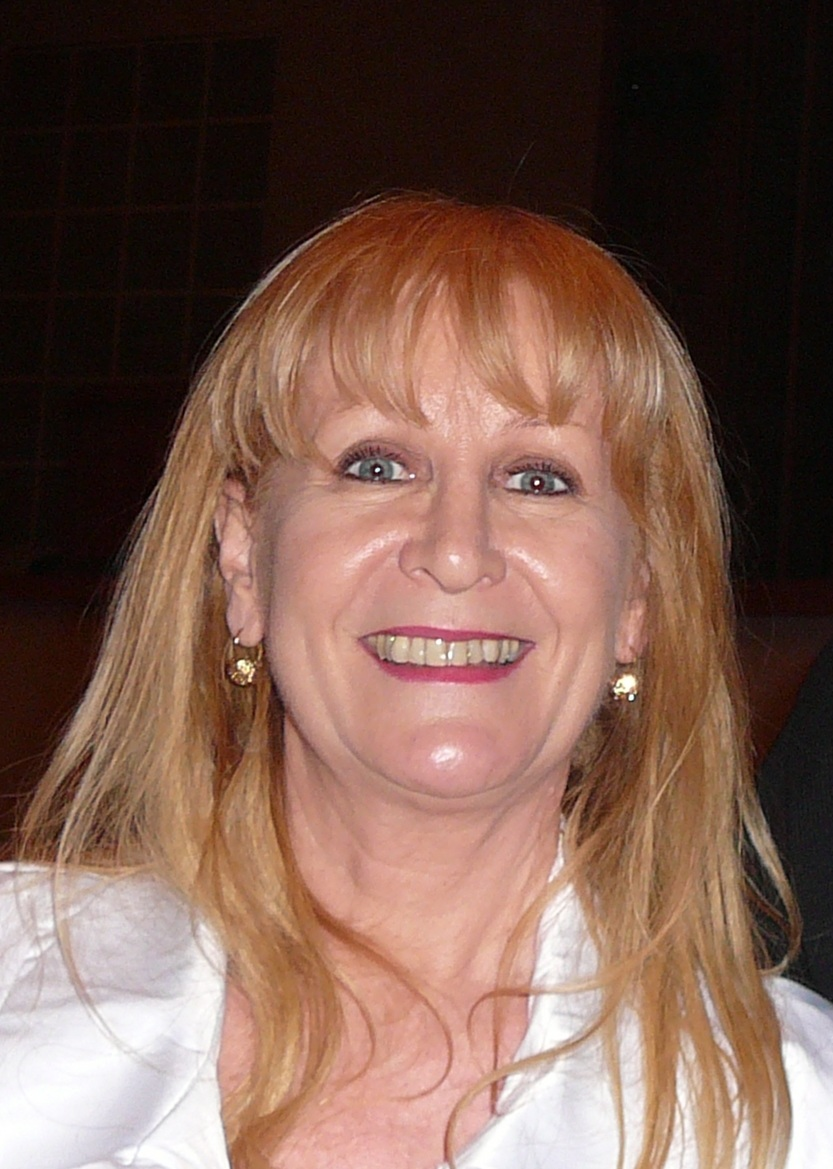

Background information
- Born: Aldegonda Angelina Francisca Leppens; 26 September 1953 (age 73); Oud-Turnhout, Belgium
- Genres: Pop, Schlager
- Occupation: Solo Artist
- Years active: 1969–present

Micha Marah (born 26 September 1953) is a Belgian singer and actress. She represented Belgium at the Eurovision Song Contest in 1979 with the song "Hey Nana" which she detested and only recorded in 2023.

After the contest recorded albums for children and schlager music in Dutch, since 1994 changed her musical style and has sung in English with Celtic influences.

== Discography ==
=== Albums ===
- "International" (1969)
- "17 Jaar - Knokke (1971)
- "Micha Marah" (1973)
- "Liever Nog Dan Ooit" (1981)
- "Alleen Voor Kinderen" (1983)
- "Alleen Voor Kinderen vol 2" (1984)
- "Portretjes" (1985)
- "Alleen Voor Kinderen vol 3" (1985)
- " Neem M'n Hand" (1992)
- "Mijn Nieuwe Bestaan" (1994)
- "No Way Back" (1995)
- "Voyage" (1998)
- "Moving On" (2000)

=== Singles ===
1969: De majoretten; 1969: Ik heb geen mannequintalent; 1969: Saki Samba; 1970: Alles O.K.; 1970: Mijn rendez-vous; 1970: Ho ho im Tampico; 1971: Tamboerke; 1971: Die heerlike wereld; 1971: Lange haren; 1971: Hey jongens; 1972: Kersen zonder stenen; 1972: Johnny Boy; 1972: Disc Jockey Napolitano; 1973: Heel alleen kan ik niet leven; 1973: Mr. Popcorn; 1974: Ik zal altijd van ja houden; 1974: Hasta mañaña; 1975: ’t is over; 1975: Beter leven geven; 1976: The French Song; 1977: Vaya con dios; 1977: Dibbi dibbi dibbi da; 1978: If You Love Me; 1978: Regen	1979: Want je zit er zomaar bij; 1979: Comment ça va; 1979: Altijd tesamen; 1979: My Lullaby; 1980: Strooi wat witte bloemen om je heen; 1980: Kom eens retour; 1981: El caballero; 1981: Ik hou van alle zes; 1981: Show Me the Way; 1982: ’s nachts als je eenzam bent; 1983: Rozen Martha; 1983: Ineke; 1984: Rosetta en haar dromen; 1984: Zestien jaar; 1984: Kerstmis voor iedereen; 1985: Als je echt van iemand houdt; 1985: Benny; 1986: Blijf van m’n vriend; 1986: Iedere dans; 1986: Jij hoort bij mij; 1987: Echte vrienden blijven vrienden; 1987: Wie gaat er mee; 1987: Vrijdagavond; 1988: Ascheid is een beetje als sterven	1988: Waarom ga je naar die ander; 1989: Samen dansen; 1989: Ik blijf op je wachten; 1989: ’t is te gek om weer verliefd te zijn; 1989: Jij bent het einde; 1990: M’n lieve man; 1990: Europe Together; 1990: Hou me vast; 1990: Kerstsingle; 1991: En ik blijf van je houden; 1991: Niets is mij teveel; 1991: En op dat ogenblik; 1992: Is dit nu alles; 1992: Kan ik nog geven om jou; 1993: Niemand; 1993: Veertig jaar; 1995: Verloren zoon; 1995: Granuaile; 1995: I Will Be There; 1995: One Heart Breaks; 1997: Only a Woman's Heart; 1997: Down in the City; 1998: Meet on the Ledge; 1998: Caledonia

== Filmography ==
- Avondspelen (1971) TV movie as Marleen
- Canzonissima (1963) TV Series as Zangeres

Preceded by Jean Vallée with "L'amour ça fait chanter la vie"	Belgium in the Eurovision Song Contest; 1979	Succeeded by Telex with "Euro-Vision"
