= Netherlands in the Eurovision Song Contest 1978 =

- Eurovision Song Contest 1978
- Participating broadcaster: Nederlandse Omroep Stichting (NOS)
- Country: Netherlands
- Selection process: Nationaal Songfestival 1978
- Selection date: 22 February 1978

Competing entry
- Song: "'t Is OK"
- Artist: Harmony
- Songwriters: Eddy Ouwens; Toon Gispen; Dick Kooiman

Placement
- Final result: 13th, 37 points

Participation chronology

The Netherlands was represented at the Eurovision Song Contest 1978 with the song "'t Is OK", composed by Eddy Ouwens, with lyrics by Toon Gispen and Dick Kooiman, and performed by the band Harmony. The Dutch participating broadcaster, Nederlandse Omroep Stichting (NOS), selected its entry through a national final.

== Before Eurovision ==
=== Nationaal Songfestival 1978 ===
The final was held at the Congresgebouw in The Hague, hosted by Willem Duys. Four acts took part, each performing two songs. The voting was by 10-member juries in the eleven Dutch provinces, with an additional jury made up of ten former Dutch Eurovision participants (Teddy Scholten, Greetje Kauffeld, De Spelbrekers, Conny Vandenbos, Lenny Kuhr, Maggie MacNeal, Getty Kaspers of Teach-In, Sandra Reemer, and Heddy Lester). Each juror awarded one point to their favourite song, with 120 points available in total. After a rather confused voting procedure (during which the juries in Gelderland and South Holland originally tried to award more than 10 points apiece), "'t Is OK" emerged the winner by a 12-point margin.

Final – 22 February 1978
R/O	Artist	Song	Points	Place
1	Barry Duncan	"Duncan"	24	2
2	Harmony	"Bim Bam Bom"	19	3
3	The Internationals	"Heel nu en dan"	7	6
4	Kimm	"Jaimie"	12	4
5	Barry Duncan	"Rosamunde"	6	7
6	Harmony	"'t Is OK"	36	1
7	The Internationals	"Boem boem boem"	10	5
8	Kimm	"Dit is mijn dag vandaag"	6	7

== At Eurovision ==
On the night of the final Harmony performed 11th in the running order, following Belgium and preceding Turkey. At the close of voting "'t Is OK" had received 37 points from eight countries, placing the Netherlands 13th of the 20 entries. The Dutch jury reciprocated the Israeli 12 points by awarding its 12 to contest winner "A-Ba-Ni-Bi".

The Dutch conductor at the contest was Harry van Hoof.

=== Voting ===
Points awarded to the Netherlands
Score	Country
12 points	Israel
10 points	
8 points	
7 points	
6 points	Luxembourg
5 points	Denmark; Italy
4 points	Germany
3 points	United Kingdom
2 points	
1 point	Monaco; Sweden

Points awarded by the Netherlands
Score	Country
12 points	Israel
10 points	Monaco
8 points	Switzerland
7 points	Germany
6 points	France
5 points	Belgium
4 points	Spain
3 points	Luxembourg
2 points	United Kingdom
1 point	Denmark
