= Belgium in the Eurovision Song Contest 1978 =

- Eurovision Song Contest 1978
- Participating broadcaster: Radio-télévision belge de la Communauté française (RTBF)
- Country: Belgium
- Selection process: Avant-première Eurovision
- Selection date: 8 February 1978

Competing entry
- Song: "L'amour ça fait chanter la vie"
- Artist: Jean Vallée
- Songwriter: Jean Vallée

Placement
- Final result: 2nd, 125 points

Participation chronology

Belgium was represented at the Eurovision Song Contest 1978 with the song "L'amour ça fait chanter la vie", written and performed by Jean Vallée. The Belgian participating broadcaster, Walloon Radio-télévision belge de la Communauté française (RTBF), selected its entry through a national final.

== Before Eurovision ==
=== Avant-première Eurovision ===
Walloon broadcaster Radio-télévision belge de la Communauté française (RTBF) had the turn to participate in the Eurovision Song Contest 1978 representing Belgium. Eight songs participated in the selection and the winner was chosen by a 12-member expert jury. The jury was chaired by Henri Billen and consisted of three members from SABAM, three journalists, three people in the radio industry, and three people in the television industry.

Avant-première Eurovision was broadcast on 8 February 1978 at 20:00 CET until 20:30 CET on RTBF 1. The jury were then given two hours to vote, and the winner was announced in a short programme at 22:35 CET. The voting was done in three rounds, in the first round three songs qualified to the second round. In the second round two songs qualified to the third and final round, where each jury member had one vote to give to either song.

Jean Vallée was the winner of the national final with seven votes in the final round. He had previously represented Belgium at the 1970 contest in Amsterdam, where he had finished fifth. Another previous Belgian entrant Jacques Hustin (1974) also took part.

Final – First Round – 8 February 1978
R/O	Artist	Song	Songwriter(s)	Result
1	Henri Seroka	"L'Odyssée"	Christian Arabian; Henri Seroka	—N/a
2	Frank Michael	"À qui parler d'amour"	Frank Michael; Jos Vanesse; Pepitchkou	—N/a
3	Jean Vallée	"L'amour ça fait chanter la vie"	Jean Vallée	Advanced
4	Jacques Hustin	"L'an 2000 c'est demain"	Jacques Hustin; Alain Y. Guilldou	Advanced
5	Paul Louka	"Le vieux marin"	Paul Louka; Jacques Viesvil	Advanced
6	Délizia	"Qui viendra réinventer l'amour"	Salvatore Adamo	—N/a
7	Marc Farell	"Confidence pour confidence"	Vincent Farrauto; L. Savary	—N/a
8	Franck Olivier	"La fête"	Roland Verlooven; Pol Forest	—N/a

Final – Second Round – 8 February 1978
Artist	Song	Result
Jean Vallée	"L'amour ça fait chanter la vie"	Advanced
Jacques Hustin	"L'an 2000 c'est demain"	Advanced
Paul Louka	"Le vieux marin"	3

Final – Third Round – 8 February 1978
Artist	Song	Votes	Result
Jean Vallée	"L'amour ça fait chanter la vie"	7	1
Jacques Hustin	"L'an 2000 c'est demain"	5	2

== At Eurovision ==
On the evening of the final Vallée performed 10th in the running order, following Switzerland and preceding the Netherlands. At the close of the voting "L'amour ça fait chanter la vie" had received 125 points with votes from all other participating countries apart from Denmark and Turkey, and including five first-place 12 points votes from France, Greece, Ireland, Monaco, and the United Kingdom. This ranked Belgium second of the 20 competing countries, the highest position achieved by a Belgian entry in Eurovision to that date, which has since only been bettered by Sandra Kim's 1986 victory and matched by Urban Trad in 2003. The Belgian jury awarded its 12 points to contest winners Israel.

=== Voting ===
Points awarded to Belgium
Score	Country
12 points	France; Greece; Ireland; Monaco; United Kingdom
10 points	Switzerland
8 points	
7 points	Israel; Luxembourg; Norway
6 points	Finland; Italy
5 points	Netherlands
4 points	Austria; Portugal; Sweden
3 points	Germany
2 points	Spain
1 point	

Points awarded by Belgium
Score	Country
12 points	Israel
10 points	Ireland
8 points	France
7 points	Switzerland
6 points	Monaco
5 points	Germany
4 points	United Kingdom
3 points	Luxembourg
2 points	Spain
1 point	Italy
