= Germany in the Eurovision Song Contest 1978 =

- Eurovision Song Contest 1978
- Participating broadcaster: ARD (Note: Arbeitsgemeinschaft der öffentlich-rechtlichen Rundfunkanstalten der Bundesrepublik Deutschland) – Südwestfunk (SWF)
- Country: Germany
- Selection process: National final
- Selection date: 20 February 1978

Competing entry
- Song: "Feuer"
- Artist: Ireen Sheer
- Songwriters: Erich Leissman; Jean Frankfurter; John Möring

Placement
- Final result: 6th, 84 points

Participation chronology

Germany was represented at the Eurovision Song Contest 1978 with the song "Feuer", composed by Erich Leissman and Jean Frankfurter, with lyrics by John Möring, and performed by Ireen Sheer. The German participating broadcaster on behalf of ARD, Südwestfunk (SWF), selected its entry through a national final. This was the second of Sheer's three Eurovision appearances; she had previously represented Luxembourg in 1974 and would later represent Luxembourg in 1985 as a member of a six-piece ensemble.

The 1978 German final is notable for the fact that voting was to be split in a 2:1 ratio between an "expert" jury and a panel of radio listeners but after hearing the songs, the expert jury decided that none was up to par and refused to vote, leaving the choice entirely in the hands of the radio panel.

== Before Eurovision ==
=== National final ===
Südwestfunk (SWF) held the national final on 20 February 1978 at its studios in Baden-Baden, hosted by Detlef Werner and broadcast on radio only. 15 songs took part with the winner originally intended to be decided by a combination of expert jury and radio listeners. However, once all the songs had been performed the expert jury stated that if these were the best songs on offer, Germany would be well-advised to withdraw completely from the 1978 contest as all were substandard. As the jury refused to vote, SWF decided that the decision would therefore be made by the radio listeners alone. Each member of the radio panel scored each song between 1 and 10 and the song with the highest average score became the winner.

Other participants in the final included Cindy & Bert (Germany 1974); Peter, Sue and Marc (Switzerland 1971, 1976, 1979, and 1981); and Helena Vondráčková, Czechoslovakia's premier female vocalist who had won the Intervision Song Contest in 1977.

20 February 1978
R/O	Artist	Song	Songwriters	Average score	Place
1	Cindy & Bert	"Was die Sterne lenkt"	Bernd Müller-Franz; Walter Brandin	5.15	5
2	Jochen Brauer Group	"Lieder die aus dem Radio klingen"	Jürgen Triebel; Horst-Herbert Krause	4.07	11
3	Marianne Rosenberg	"Nein, weinen werd' ich nicht"	Joachim Heider; Christian Heilburg	5.03	7
4	Tony	"Mädchen wie Helena"	Hans-Georg Moslener; Manfred Oberdörffer	4.51	9
5	Andy Norden	"Susann"	Jimmy Bowien; Andy Norden	3.81	14
6	Albatross	"Komm und bleib die Nacht bei mir"	Jimmy Bowien; Wolfgang Mürmann	4.16	10
7	Helena Vondráčková	"Männer wie du"	Hans-Georg Moslener; Wolfgang Mürmann	3.98	12
8	Peter, Sue and Marc	"Charlie Chaplin"	Rolf Zuckowski	5.31	3
9	Brunhilde Lamberty	"Kennst du die Zeit"	Wolfgang Dyhr; Siegfried Freymann	3.70	15
10	Freya & Bernd Wippich	"Ich trag' deinen Namen"	Bernd Wippich; Christian Heilburg	3.91	13
11	Sunrise	"Liverpool"	Hanno Harders; Holger Kopp; Bernd Meinunger	5.34	2
12	Jonny Hill	"Louisiana"	Hans-Georg Moslener; Wolfgang Mürmann	4.90	8
13	Ireen Sheer	"Feuer"	Jean Frankfurter; John Möring	5.56	1
14	Cindy & Bert	"Chanson d'été"	Norbert Berger	5.30	4
15	Royal Brewery	"Ein Lied für Europa"	Drafi Deutscher	5.04	6

== At Eurovision ==
On the evening of the final Sheer performed 13th in the running order, following Turkey and preceding Monaco. At the close of voting "Feuer" had received 84 points from 14 countries, placing Germany 6th of the 20 entries. The German jury awarded its 12 points to contest winners Israel.

The show was watched by 8.9 million viewers in Germany.

=== Voting ===
Points awarded to Germany
Score	Country
12 points	Finland
10 points	Monaco; Spain
8 points	Turkey
7 points	Greece; Netherlands; Portugal; Sweden
6 points	
5 points	Belgium
4 points	
3 points	Israel; Italy; Switzerland
2 points	
1 point	Denmark; Ireland

Points awarded by Germany
Score	Country
12 points	Israel
10 points	France
8 points	United Kingdom
7 points	Monaco
6 points	Switzerland
5 points	Ireland
4 points	Netherlands
3 points	Belgium
2 points	Italy
1 point	Austria
