= A-Ba-Ni-Bi =

1978 song by Izhar Cohen and the Alphabeta

- English release cover

Single by Izhar Cohen and the Alphabeta
- Language: Hebrew
- B-side: "Illusions"
- Released: 1978
- Genre: Disco
- Length: 2:55
- Label: Polydor
- Composer: Nurit Hirsh
- Lyricist: Ehud Manor

Eurovision Song Contest 1978 entry
- Country: Israel
- Artists: Izhar Cohen; Reuven Erez; Lisa Gold-Rubin; Itzhak Okev; Nehama Shutan; Esther Tzuberi
- As: Izhar Cohen and the Alphabeta
- Language: Hebrew
- Composer: Nurit Hirsh
- Lyricist: Ehud Manor
- Conductor: Nurit Hirsh

Finals performance
- Final result: 1st
- Final points: 157

Entry chronology
- ◄ "Ahava Hi Shir Lishnayim" (1977)
- "Hallelujah" (1979) ►

Official performance video
- "A-Ba-Ni-Bi" on YouTube

"A-Ba-Ni-Bi" (Hebrew script: א-ב-ני-בי; bet-language game for the word אני aní, meaning "I" in Hebrew) is a song recorded by the Israeli group Izhar Cohen and the Alphabeta, with music composed by Nurit Hirsh and lyrics written by Ehud Manor. It represented Israel in the Eurovision Song Contest 1978 held in Paris, winning the contest.

== Background ==
=== Conception ===
"A-Ba-Ni-Bi" was composed by Nurit Hirsh with lyrics by Ehud Manor, a duo who had collaborated frequently in writing Israeli Eurovision entries, including the country's debut "Ey Sham". It is an up-tempo disco number, heralding a move towards this style of performance in later years. In addition to the version fully in Hebrew, Izhar Cohen and the Alphabeta recorded a version with English and Hebrew lyrics. The Alphabeta was a group of singers composed by two men, Reuven Erez and Itzhak Okev, and three women, Lisa Gold-Rubin, Nehama Shutan, and Esther Tzuberi.

The song deals with the way in which children relate to love. Cohen sings that, growing up, "we loved secretly/Who were we nice to?—Just uncles and aunts" and that love was conducted secretly and "We whispered only in the 'bet language'". He compares this to adulthood, where he realises that "Love is a beautiful word" and that humanity should "speak in a language of love", instead of the language of secrecy. For this reason, the song uses the Bet language—a children's language game where each syllable of the word is repeated with a bet preceding the vowel. Thus, the Hebrew ani ohev otach (אני אוהב אותך, "I love you") becomes a-ba-ni-bi o-bo-he-bev o-bo-ta-bach. Mistakenly, the song title was captioned on screen at the contest as being "Ah-Bah-Nee-Bee" and was further confused in the UK singles market when listed on the official singles chart compiled by Music Week as "A-Bi-Ni-Bi". Musically, the song is somewhat unusual among Contest entries for ending almost immediately after the key change—most entries have either a bridge or a repetition of the chorus after this point.

=== Eurovision ===
On 11 February 1978, "A-Ba-Ni-Bi" performed by Izhar Cohen and the Alphabeta competed in the national final that the Israeli Broadcasting Authority (IBA) organized to select its song and performer for the 23rd edition of the Eurovision Song Contest. The song won the competition so it became the Israeli entry –and Izhar Cohen and the Alphabeta the performers– for Eurovision.

On 22 April 1978, the Eurovision Song Contest was held at the Palais des Congrès in Paris hosted by Télévision Française 1 (TF1) and broadcast live throughout the continent. Izhar Cohen and the Alphabeta performed "A-Ba-Ni-Bi" eighteenth on the evening, following Luxembourg's "Parlez-vous français?" by Baccara and preceding Austria's "Mrs. Caroline Robinson" by Springtime. Nurit Hirsh conducted the event's live orchestra in the performance of the Israeli entry.

At the close of voting, the song had received 157 points, placing first in a field of twenty, and winning the contest. The song received points from every other voting country except Sweden, including six sets of maximum 12 points. This was Israel's first Eurovision win, and it was succeeded in 1979 as contest winner and as Israeli entry by "Hallelujah" by Milk and Honey. Israel thus became the third country, after Spain (1968 and 1969) and Luxembourg (1972 and 1973), to win the contest in two successive years.

It was reported that several broadcasters of the non-participating Arab countries who were broadcasting the contest, cut abruptly the broadcast when it was clear Israel was going to win. Jordanian television cut the broadcast and showed pictures of flowers.

=== Aftermath ===
Izhar Cohen and the Alphabeta (Note: The Alphabeta appeared as a quartet, with two boys and two girls; a different line up from the quintet who had won in 1978.) performed their song in the Eurovision twenty-fifth anniversary show Songs of Europe held on 22 August 1981 in Mysen. Izhar Cohen returned to Eurovision in the 1985 contest held in Gothenburg with "Olé, Olé", finishing fifth in a field of nineteen.

The song was performed as part of a medley of favorites in the opening number of the Eurovision fiftieth anniversary competition Congratulations: 50 Years of the Eurovision Song Contest, held on 22 October 2005 in Copenhagen, and in the opening number of the semi-final of the 2006 contest, held on 18 May 2006 in Athens.

== Chart performance ==
=== Weekly charts ===
Chart (1978)	Peak position
Austria (Ö3 Austria Top 40)	21
Belgium (Ultratop 50 Flanders)	6
France (IFOP)	25
Germany (GfK)	22
Netherlands (Dutch Top 40)	12
Netherlands (Single Top 100)	17
Sweden (Sverigetopplistan)	9
Switzerland (Schweizer Hitparade)	4
UK Singles (Official Charts)	20

== Legacy ==
"A-Ba-Ni-Bi" was covered by Grup Vitamin, Turkish parody music group as "Acaba bu ne baba be?" ("I wonder what is this dad, hey?" in Turkish) in Aşkın gözyaşları ("Tears of Love"), which was their 1994 album.

A Chinese version performed by Shiao Lih-ju, titled "迎著風的女孩" ("The Girl Facing the Wind" in Chinese), was released in 1980. A cover by Harlem Yu of the Chinese version was released in 2009.

A parody of the song, with identical Hebrew lyrics in the first two lines and two lines in Mandarin Chinese, was used as the opening song of Hong Kong broadcaster TVB's 2009 game show Boom Boom Ba.

The song was performed in 2018, on a one-stringed guitar by Israeli singer Netta Barzilai who won the Eurovision Song Contest 2018.

The song was covered by:

- Connie Francis
- Beti Jurković in Croatian, as "Ja pa te pe vo po lim pi" (from ja te volim, also "I love you")
- Frederik in Finnish, as "Rakkauden aika."
- El Chaval de la Peca (Marc Parrot) in Spanish.

It was also parodied as "I wanna be a polar bear" (intentionally misheard lyrics).

A Thai rendition of the song, performed by Thai singer Hongtong Daoudon, was featured on the third season of The White Lotus.

== Notes ==
Preceded by "L'oiseau et l'enfant" by Marie Myriam	Eurovision Song Contest winners 1978	Succeeded by "Hallelujah" by Milk and Honey
