= Ulla Pia =

Danish singer (1945–2020)

Ulla Pia Nielsen
- Born: 17 February 1945; Copenhagen, German Occupied Denmark
- Died: 22 August 2020 (aged 75) Gammel Holte, Denmark
- Genres: Pop, Jazz
- Occupation: Singer

Ulla Pia Nielsen (17 February 1945 – 22 August 2020), known simply as Ulla Pia, was a Danish singer, best known internationally for her participation in the 1966 Eurovision Song Contest.

Ulla Pia was born in Copenhagen, where she started her career as a vocalist with bands and orchestras. In the mid-1960s she was singing with jazz musician Finn Ziegler, and it was suggested in 1966 that she enter a song in the Danish Eurovision selection, Dansk Melodi Grand Prix. She performed the song "Stop - mens legen er go'" ("Stop, While the Going's Good"), and to her surprise, emerged the clear winner. Ulla Pia stated in a recent interview that she had assumed that one of her better-known competitors (such as Dario Campeotto or Gustav Winckler) would win, and her victory came as a shock to her. Ulla Pia went forward to the eleventh Eurovision Song Contest, held on 5 March in Luxembourg City, where "Stop – mens legen er go'" could manage only 14th place of the 18 entries, despite an engaging performance in which Ulla Pia was joined on stage, unusually for the time, by two dancers. It would prove to be Denmark's last Eurovision appearance for over a decade, as broadcaster DR withdrew from the competition in 1967, and would not return until 1978.

In the years following her Eurovision appearance, Ulla Pia went on to release several popular singles in Denmark, notably "Karina" and the topical "Flower Power Tøj". She toured regularly into the 1970s, but towards the end of the decade increasing family commitments, combined with a period of ill-health, caused her to retire from show business.

Ulla Pia died on 22 August 2020, aged 75.

Preceded by Birgit Brüel with For din skyld	Denmark in the Eurovision Song Contest; 1966	Succeeded by Mabel with Boom Boom
