= Boom Boom (Mabel song) =

1978 song by Mike Tramp

Single by Mabel
- Language: Danish
- Released: 1978
- Genre: Rock; Pop
- Length: 2:58

Eurovision Song Contest 1978 entry
- Country: Denmark
- Artists: Michael Trempenau; Peter Nielsen; Christian Have; Andy Kulmbak
- Language: Danish
- Composer: Mabel
- Lyricist: Mabel
- Conductor: Helmer Olesen

Finals performance
- Final result: 16th
- Final points: 13

Entry chronology
- ◄ "Stop – mens legen er go'" (1966)
- "Disco Tango" (1979) ►

"Boom Boom" was the Danish entry in the Eurovision Song Contest 1978, performed in Danish by Mabel. This was the first Danish entry at Eurovision since 1966, ending an absence of twelve years.

It was succeeded as Danish representative at the Eurovision Song Contest 1979 by Tommy Seebach with "Disco Tango".

== Background ==
The song is sung as a dialogue among friends, with one explaining that he is suffering from an illness. The others suggest what it could be, but he reports that a trip to the doctor resulted in a diagnosis of being in love – with the rhythm of the heart being the title of the song.

In the late 70s Mabel moved their operation to Spain after gaining more notoriety when their catchy number "Boom Boom" was chosen as the official Danish selection for the Eurovision Song Contest in 1978.

The song wins the competition, and from being a smaller band with some success, Mabel is suddenly on everyone's lips. They have since achieved greater success in Denmark and across Europe.

== Song competitions ==
=== Dansk Melodi Grand Prix 1978 ===
The Dansk Melodi Grand Prix 1978 was held at the Tivoli Concert Hall in Copenhagen, hosted by Jørgen Mylius. The musical director was Ole Kurt Jensen. Six songs took part with the winner being decided by votes from eight regional juries.

=== Eurovision Song Contest 1978 ===
On the night of the final Mabel performed 16th in the running order, following Greece's Tania Tsanaklidou with "Charlie Chaplin" and preceding Luxembourg's Baccara with "Parlez-vous français ?". At the close of voting, it had received 13 points, placing 16th in a field of 20. The Danish jury awarded its 12 points to Spain.

== Certifications ==
Region	Certification	Certified units/sales
Denmark (IFPI Danmark)	Gold	45,000^{‡}
^{‡} Sales+streaming figures based on certification alone.
