= Denmark in the Eurovision Song Contest 1978 =

- Eurovision Song Contest 1978
- Participating broadcaster: Danmarks Radio (DR)
- Country: Denmark
- Selection process: Dansk Melodi Grand Prix 1978
- Selection date: 25 February 1978

Competing entry
- Song: "Boom Boom"
- Artist: Mabel
- Songwriters: Mabel

Placement
- Final result: 16th, 13 points

Participation chronology

Denmark was represented at the Eurovision Song Contest 1978 with the song "Boom Boom", written and performed by the group Mabel. The Danish participating broadcaster, Danmarks Radio (DR), organised the Dansk Melodi Grand Prix 1978 in order to select its entry for the contest. This marked Denmark's return to Eurovision after an 12-year absence.

== Before Eurovision ==
=== Melodi Grand Prix 78 ===
Danmarks Radio (DR) held the Melodi Grand Prix 78 on 25 February at the Tivoli Concert Hall in Copenhagen, hosted by Jørgen de Mylius. The musical director was Ole Kurt Jensen. Six songs took part with the winner being decided by votes from eight regional juries.

Other participants included both Denmark's first Eurovision winner, Grethe Ingmann, and their eventual second winners, the Olsen Brothers.

Final – 25 February 1978
| R/O | Artist | Song | Conductor | Points | Place |
|---|---|---|---|---|---|
| 1 | Olsen Brothers | "San Francisco" | Ole Kurt Jensen | 37 | 2 |
| 2 | Flair | "Du var superstar" | Peder Kragerup | 29 | 3 |
| 3 | Daimi Gentle & Birds of Beauty | "Tornerose" | Ole Kurt Jensen | 9 | 6 |
| 4 | Grethe Ingmann | "Eventyr" | Leif Pedersen | 23 | 5 |
| 5 | Mabel | "Boom Boom" | Helmer Olesen | 46 | 1 |
| 6 | Ulla Neumann | "Hvem, hvad og hvorfor ikke" | Ole Kurt Jensen | 24 | 4 |

Detailed Regional Jury Votes
| R/O | Song | Aabenraa | Næstved | Rønne | Aalborg | Odense | Holstebro | Copenhagen | Aarhus | Total |
|---|---|---|---|---|---|---|---|---|---|---|
| 1 | "San Francisco" | 5 | 3 | 6 | 5 | 4 | 5 | 4 | 5 | 37 |
| 2 | "Du var superstar" | 4 | 2 | 4 | 3 | 2 | 4 | 6 | 4 | 29 |
| 3 | "Tornerose" | 1 | 1 | 2 | 1 | 1 | 1 | 1 | 1 | 9 |
| 4 | "Eventyr" | 2 | 5 | 3 | 2 | 3 | 3 | 3 | 2 | 23 |
| 5 | "Boom Boom" | 6 | 6 | 5 | 6 | 6 | 6 | 5 | 6 | 46 |
| 6 | "Hvem, hvad og hvorfor ikke" | 3 | 4 | 1 | 4 | 5 | 2 | 2 | 3 | 24 |

== At Eurovision ==
On the night of the final Mabel performed 16th in the running order, following Greece's "Charlie Chaplin" by Tania Tsanaklidou and preceding Luxembourg's "Parlez-vous français ?" by Baccara. At the close of voting "Boom Boom" had received 13 points, placing Denmark 16th of the 20 entries. The Danish jury awarded its 12 points to Spain.

The contest was broadcast on DR TV, with commentary by Jørgen de Mylius.

=== Voting ===
Points awarded to Denmark
| Score | Country |
|---|---|
| 12 points | |
| 10 points | |
| 8 points | |
| 7 points | |
| 6 points | France |
| 5 points | |
| 4 points | Israel |
| 3 points | |
| 2 points | Austria |
| 1 point | Netherlands |

Points awarded by Denmark
| Score | Country |
|---|---|
| 12 points | Spain |
| 10 points | Monaco |
| 8 points | France |
| 7 points | Luxembourg |
| 6 points | Israel |
| 5 points | Netherlands |
| 4 points | Greece |
| 3 points | Switzerland |
| 2 points | Austria |
| 1 point | Germany |
