= Spain in the Eurovision Song Contest 1978 =

- Eurovision Song Contest 1978
- Participating broadcaster: Televisión Española (TVE)
- Country: Spain
- Selection process: Internal selection
- Announcement date: 8 March 1978

Competing entry
- Song: "Bailemos un vals"
- Artist: José Vélez
- Songwriters: Manuel de la Calva; Ramón Arcusa

Placement
- Final result: 9th, 65 points

Participation chronology

Spain was represented at the Eurovision Song Contest 1978 with the song "Bailemos un vals", written by Manuel de la Calva and Ramón Arcusa of Dúo Dinámico, and performed by José Vélez. The Spanish participating broadcaster, Televisión Española (TVE), internally selected its entry for the contest. The song, performed in position 7, placed ninth –tying with the song from Switzerland– out of twenty competing entries with 65 points.

== Before Eurovision ==
Televisión Española (TVE) assembled a jury of 26 members from across the country who, locked up on 7 March 1978, internally selected "Bailemos un vals" performed by José Vélez as the Spanish entry for the Eurovision Song Contest 1978. The song was written by Manuel de la Calva and Ramón Arcusa, the members of Dúo Dinámico. The title of the song, the songwriters, and performer were announced on 8 March. TVE filmed a program dedicated to Vélez on location in the Canary Islands, where he is from, directed by Valerio Lazarov and from where the preview video for the song was extracted. He also recorded the song in French with lyrics by Sophie Makhno as "Voulez-vous danser avec moi" and in German as "Señorita wir sind ein Paar".

== At Eurovision ==
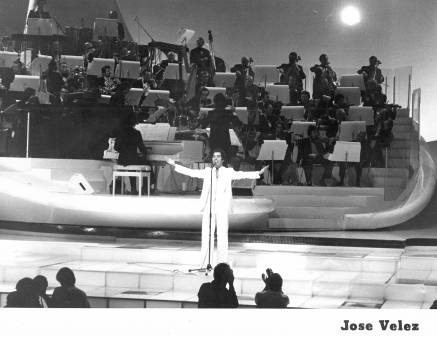
Vélez at the Eurovision stage.

On 22 April 1978, the Eurovision Song Contest was held at the Palais des Congrès in Paris hosted by Télévision Française 1 (TF1) and broadcast live throughout the continent. Vélez performed "Bailemos un vals" 7th in the evening, following France and preceding the United Kingdom. Ramón Arcusa conducted the event's orchestra performance of the Spanish entry. Vélez was accompanied on stage by Trío La La La as backing singers. At the close of voting "Bailemos un vals" had received 65 points, placing 9th in a field of 20 –tying with the song from Switzerland–.

TVE broadcast the contest in Spain on TVE 1 with commentary by Miguel de los Santos. Before the event, TVE aired a talk show hosted by Matías Prats Luque introducing the Spanish jury, which continued after the contest commenting on the results.

=== Voting ===
TVE assembled a jury panel with eleven members. The following members comprised the Spanish jury:

- María Fernanda Azagra – housewife
- Pablo Hardy – industrialist
- Carmen Pérez Cobas – student
- Daniel Martín Farias – building engineer
- Manolo Royo – comedian
- Pilar Ruiz – model
- Jose Ignacio Martín Pulido – postman
- Jesús Tardón Dimas – labourer
- Manuela Vega Benigno – secretary
- Justo Miguel Redondo – odontologist
- Bárbara Rey – actress

The jury was chaired by Miguel Ángel Gozalo, who was the director of media relations at TVE, with Matías Prats as secretary and spokesperson, and Luis de los Ríos as scrutineer. These did not have the right to vote, but the president decided in the event of a tie. The jury awarded its maximum of 12 points to Luxembourg, who was represented by the Spanish duo Baccara.

Points awarded to Spain
| Score | Country |
|---|---|
| 12 points | Denmark |
| 10 points | |
| 8 points | Switzerland |
| 7 points | Austria; Finland; Turkey |
| 6 points | Greece; Israel |
| 5 points | |
| 4 points | Monaco; Netherlands |
| 3 points | |
| 2 points | Belgium; Luxembourg |
| 1 point | |

Points awarded by Spain
| Score | Country |
|---|---|
| 12 points | Luxembourg |
| 10 points | Germany |
| 8 points | Italy |
| 7 points | Greece |
| 6 points | Israel |
| 5 points | France |
| 4 points | Switzerland |
| 3 points | United Kingdom |
| 2 points | Belgium |
| 1 point | Portugal |
