= United Kingdom in the Eurovision Song Contest 1978 =

- Eurovision Song Contest 1978
- Participating broadcaster: British Broadcasting Corporation (BBC)
- Country: United Kingdom
- Selection process: A Song for Europe 1978
- Selection date: 31 March 1978

Competing entry
- Song: "The Bad Old Days"
- Artist: Co-Co
- Songwriters: Stephanie de Sykes; Stuart Slater

Placement
- Final result: 11th, 61 points

Participation chronology

The United Kingdom was represented at the Eurovision Song Contest 1978 with the song "The Bad Old Days", written by Stephanie de Sykes and Stuart Slater, and performed by the band Co-Co. The British participating broadcaster, the British Broadcasting Corporation (BBC), selected its entry through a national final.

== Before Eurovision ==
=== A Song for Europe 1978 ===
The national final was held on Friday 31 March 1978 at the Royal Albert Hall, presented by Terry Wogan. The songs were backed by the Alyn Ainsworth Orchestra.

Fourteen regional juries voted on the songs: Bristol, Bangor, Leeds, Norwich, Newcastle, Aberdeen, Birmingham, Manchester, Belfast, Cardiff, Plymouth, Glasgow, Southampton, and London. Each jury voted internally and ranked the songs 1–12, awarding 12 points for their highest scoring song, down to 1 point for the lowest scoring entry.

"The Bad Old Days" won the national and came 11th in the contest. Broadcast on the Friday after the Easter weekend in the United Kingdom, A Song for Europe 1978 was watched by 13.7 million viewers and was the 16th-most watched programme of the week – the show's highest ever rating.

A Song for Europe 1978 – 31 March 1978
R/O	Artist	Song	Songwriter(s)	Points	Place
1	Christian	"Shine It On"	Bill Martin; Phil Coulter	114	3
2	Brown Sugar	"Oh No, Look What You've Done"	Wayne Bickerton; Tony Waddington	49	11
3	Fruit Eating Bears	"Door in My Face"	Neville Crozier; Chris Crash	49	11
4	Jacquie Sullivan	"Moments"	Jacquie Sullivan	106	6
5	Sunshine	"Too Much in Love"	Wayne Bickerton; Tony Waddington	81	8
6	Ronnie France	"Lonely Nights"	Paul Curtis	68	9
7	The Jarvis Brothers	"One Glance"	Paul Curtis	114	3
8	Co-Co	"The Bad Old Days"	Stephanie de Sykes; Stuart Slater	135	1
9	Bob James	"We Got It Bad"	Bob James; Labi Siffre	66	10
10	Midnight	"Don't Bother to Knock"	Kenny Lynch; Steve O'Donnell; Colin Horton-Jennings	116	2
11	Babe Rainbow	"Don't Let Me Stand in Your Way"	Irving Martin; Peter Morris	84	7
12	Labi Siffre	"Solid Love"	Labi Siffre	110	5

Both groups Co-Co and Sunshine had participated in A Song for Europe 1976, albeit with different line-ups. Co-Co would return to A Song for Europe 1980 with another line-up, under the name The Main Event. Co-Co's member Cheryl Baker would eventually win the Eurovision Song Contest 1981 with the group Bucks Fizz.

Regional jury votes
R/O	Song	Aberdeen	Norwich	Manchester	Bangor	Southampton	Leeds	Belfast	Bristol	Glasgow	Birmingham	London	Cardiff	Newcastle	Plymouth	Total
1	"Shine It On"	12	11	9	10	5	4	11	12	12	7	9	3	5	4	114
2	"Oh No, Look What You've Done"	7	2	2	1	3	2	2	9	5	2	3	1	4	6	49
3	"Door in My Face"	2	1	7	2	1	7	3	3	2	3	1	2	10	5	49
4	"Moments"	8	8	11	7	8	3	9	6	10	8	10	6	3	9	106
5	"Too Much in Love"	9	3	5	4	2	6	10	7	9	5	6	7	6	2	81
6	"Lonely Nights"	1	4	1	8	4	5	1	2	1	10	7	11	12	1	68
7	"One Glance"	6	7	3	5	9	12	6	11	11	9	12	4	11	8	114
8	"The Bad Old Days"	11	12	12	11	10	11	7	4	3	11	11	12	8	12	135
9	"We Got It Bad"	3	6	10	3	12	1	4	1	8	1	4	5	1	7	66
10	"Don't Bother to Knock"	4	9	8	6	11	10	8	5	7	12	8	10	7	11	116
11	"Don't Let Me Stand in Your Way"	5	5	4	9	7	8	5	10	6	6	5	9	2	3	84
12	"Solid Love"	10	10	6	12	6	9	12	8	4	4	2	8	9	10	110
Regional jury spokespersons
Aberdeen – Gerry Davis; Norwich – Chris Denham; Manchester – Mike Riddoch; Bangor – Gwyn Llewelyn; Southampton – Peter Macann; Leeds – Brian Baines; Belfast – Michael Baguley; Bristol – Derek Jones; Glasgow – Ken Bruce; Birmingham – Tom Coyne; London – Ray Moore; Cardiff – Frank Lincoln; Newcastle – Mike Neville; Plymouth – Donald Heighway

== At Eurovision ==
The contest was broadcast on BBC1, with commentary by Terry Wogan, and on radio stations BBC Radio 1 and BBC Radio 2, with commentary by Ray Moore. The contest was watched by 21 million viewers.

The BBC appointed Colin Berry as its spokesperson to announce the British jury results.

=== Voting ===
Points awarded to the United Kingdom
Score	Country
12 points	
10 points	
8 points	Germany
7 points	Monaco
6 points	Portugal; Turkey
5 points	Austria; Luxembourg
4 points	Belgium
3 points	Greece; Ireland; Spain; Sweden
2 points	France; Israel; Netherlands; Switzerland
1 point	

Points awarded by the United Kingdom
Score	Country
12 points	Belgium
10 points	Monaco
8 points	France
7 points	Luxembourg
6 points	Italy
5 points	Israel
4 points	Sweden
3 points	Netherlands
2 points	Switzerland
1 point	Turkey
