= Jonny Hill =

Jonny Hill may refer to:

- Jonny Hill (singer), Austrian pop singer
- Jonny Hill (rugby union)

== See also ==
- Johnny Hill
