= Finland in the Eurovision Song Contest 1978 =

- Eurovision Song Contest 1978
- Participating broadcaster: Yleisradio (Yle)
- Country: Finland
- Selection process: National final
- Selection date: 11 February 1978

Competing entry
- Song: "Anna rakkaudelle tilaisuus"
- Artist: Seija Simola
- Songwriters: Reijo Karvonen; Seija Simola

Placement
- Final result: 18th, 2 points

Participation chronology

Finland was represented at the Eurovision Song Contest 1978 with the song "Anna rakkaudelle tilaisuus", written by Reijo Karvonen and Seija Simola, and performed by Simola herself. The Finnish participating broadcaster, Yleisradio (Yle), selected its entry through a national final.

== Before Eurovision ==
Seven entries were selected for the competition from 137 received submissions. The members of the selection jury were Heikki Seppälä, Ossi Runne, Jarmo Porola, Risto Hiltunen, Kari Kantalainen, Julius Heikkilä, Ilpo Saastamoinen, and Arthur Fuhrmann.

=== National final ===
Yleisradio (Yle) held the Finnish national final on 11 February 1978 at its television studios in Tampere, hosted by Klaus Thomasson. This was the first time the national selection was held outside of Helsinki since Helsinki's television studios were under renovation. The final was held in conjunction with the Intervision national final. For the first time since 1966 the conductor in the national final was not Ossi Runne but Risto Hiltunen instead. The winner was chosen by regional juries. Each jury group consisted of 15 members, and each juror distributed their points between 1–5 points for each song.

In addition to the performances of the competing entries, the interval act featured Helena Vondráčková, the previous year's winner of Intervision Song Contest, performing "The Windmills of Your Mind" and "Honey Pie".

Final – 11 February 1978
R/O	Artist	Song	Songwriter(s)	Points	Place
1	Seija Simola	"Anna rakkaudelle tilaisuus"	Reijo Karvonen; Seija Simola	271	1
2	Mirumaru	"ABC"	Antti Hyvärinen; Pertti Reponen	193	5
3	Reijo Karvonen	"Lemmenlaulu"	Eero Lupari	193	5
4	Martti Metsäketo	"En viipyä voi"	Eino Virtanen; Krista Kari	88	7
5	Lea Laven	"Aamulla rakkaani näin"	Raul Reiman	258	2
6	Anneli Saaristo	"Sinun kanssasi, sinua ilman"	Eero Tiikasalo; Erkki Mäkinen	221	4
7	Katri Helena	"Ystävä"	Timo Kalaoja; Katri Helena Kalaoja	258	2

Scoreboard
R/O	Song	Turku	Oulu	Helsinki	Tampere	Lappeenranta	Total
1	"Anna rakkaudelle tilaisuus"	53	60	60	56	42	271
2	"ABC"	40	43	33	39	38	193
3	"Lemmenlaulu"	39	47	38	36	33	193
4	"En viipyä voi"	21	16	18	16	17	88
5	"Aamulla rakkaani näin"	49	53	55	58	43	258
6	"Sinun kanssasi, sinua ilman"	47	37	53	37	47	221
7	"Ystävä"	52	51	48	57	50	258

== At Eurovision ==
On the night of the final Simola performed fourth in the running order following Italy and preceding Portugal. Simola was accompanied by Kalle Fält, Irma Tapio and Pepe Willberg as backing vocalists. The Finnish entry was conducted by Ossi Runne. Finland received two points from Norway and placed joint 18th (with Turkey) of the 20 entries.

=== Voting ===
Points awarded to Finland
Score	Country
12 points	
10 points	
8 points	
7 points	
6 points	
5 points	
4 points	
3 points	
2 points	Norway
1 point	

Points awarded by Finland
Score	Country
12 points	Germany
10 points	Israel
8 points	Monaco
7 points	Spain
6 points	Belgium
5 points	Greece
4 points	Sweden
3 points	Ireland
2 points	France
1 point	Switzerland
