= Ireland in the Eurovision Song Contest 1978 =

- Eurovision Song Contest 1978
- Participating broadcaster: Radio Telefís Éireann (RTÉ)
- Country: Ireland
- Selection process: National Song Contest
- Selection date: 5 March 1978

Competing entry
- Song: "Born to Sing"
- Artist: Colm C. T. Wilkinson
- Songwriter: Colm C. T. Wilkinson

Placement
- Final result: 5th, 86 points

Participation chronology

Ireland was represented at the Eurovision Song Contest 1978 with the song "Born to Sing", written and performed by Colm C. T. Wilkinson. The Irish participating broadcaster, Radio Telefís Éireann (RTÉ), selected its entry through a national final.

== Before Eurovision ==
=== National Song Contest ===
Radio Telefís Éireann (RTÉ) held the fourteenth edition of the National Song Contest on Sunday 5 March 1978 at its studios in Dublin, hosted by Mike Murphy. Eight songs took part, with the winner chosen by voting from ten regional juries. Other participants included future Irish representatives Sheeba (1981), and Linda Martin (1984 and 1992) who performed as a member of the group Chips.

R/O	Artist	Song	Points	Place
1	Reform	"You Gotta Get Up"	7	5
2	Jamie Stone	"Over Again"	4	7
3	Sheeba	"It's Amazing What Love Can Do"	6	6
4	Danny Doyle	"Lonely Now"	1	8
5	Chips	"Happy Days"	8	4
6	Colm C. T. Wilkinson	"Born to Sing"	46	1
7	Gemma Craven	"All Fall Down"	12	3
8	Stacc	"You Put The Love In My Heart"	16	2

Detailed Regional Jury Votes
R/O	Song	Kilkenny	Ballyshannon	Cork	Monaghan	Galway	Wexford	Dublin	Limerick	Mullingar	Ballina	Total
1	"You Gotta Get Up"	2	1					1	3			7
2	"Over Again"	1	1								2	4
3	"It's Amazing What Love Can Do"		1		3	1	1					6
4	"Lonely Now"										1	1
5	"Happy Days"			1	1	3				3		8
6	"Born to Sing"	2	5	7	4	2	8	4	7	4	3	46
7	"All Fall Down"		1	2	2			3		2	2	12
8	"You Put The Love In My Heart"	5	1			4	1	2		1	2	16

== At Eurovision ==
On the night of the final Wilkinson performed first in the running order, preceding Norway. At the close of voting "Born to Sing" had picked up 86 points, placing Ireland fifth of the 20 entries. The Irish jury awarded its 12 points to Belgium.

=== Voting ===
Points awarded to Ireland
Score	Country
12 points	Norway
10 points	Belgium; Greece; Luxembourg; Turkey
8 points	Sweden
7 points	Switzerland
6 points	Austria
5 points	France; Germany
4 points	
3 points	Finland
2 points	
1 point	

Points awarded by Ireland
Score	Country
12 points	Belgium
10 points	Italy
8 points	Israel
7 points	Greece
6 points	France
5 points	Sweden
4 points	Monaco
3 points	United Kingdom
2 points	Luxembourg
1 point	Germany
