= Israel in the Eurovision Song Contest 1978 =

- Eurovision Song Contest 1978
- Participating broadcaster: Israel Broadcasting Authority (IBA)
- Country: Israel
- Selection process: Israel Song Festival 1978
- Selection date: 11 February 1978

Competing entry
- Song: "A-Ba-Ni-Bi"
- Artist: Izhar Cohen and the Alphabeta
- Songwriters: Nurit Hirsh; Ehud Manor

Placement
- Final result: 1st, 157 points

Participation chronology

Israel was represented at the Eurovision Song Contest 1978 with the song "A-Ba-Ni-Bi", composed (and conducted) by Nurit Hirsh, with lyrics by Ehud Manor, and performed by Izhar Cohen and the Alphabeta. The Israeli participating broadcaster, the Israel Broadcasting Authority (IBA), selected its entry through a national final. The song went on to win the contest, bringing Israel its first Eurovision victory, and being the first victory for a country outside of continental Europe.

== Before Eurovision ==
=== Israel Song Festival 1978 ===
In 1978, the Israel Broadcasting Authority (IBA) held for the first time a proper national final to select its entry in the Eurovision Song Contest. IBA had internally selected every entry between its debut in 1973 and 1977, but following public consternation regarding Ilanit being chosen to represent Israel a second time, the broadcaster decided to reformat the annual Israel Song Festival to be a Eurovision selection show.

The Israeli national final was held on 11 February 1978 at the Jerusalem Theatre, hosted by Rivka Michaeli. Izhak Graziani served as the musical director. Twelve songs were in the running to represent Israel, and the performers included Gidi Gov (who had previously represented Israel in 1974 as a member of Kaveret) and Gali Atari (who would win the following year's selection, and indeed the actual contest, alongside Milk and Honey). Regional juries determined the winner, and at the end of the voting two songs were tied for first: Izhar Cohen and the Alphabeta's "A-Ba-Ni-Bi" and Chedva Amrani and Pilpel Lavan's "Belev echad." A re-count of the votes of the individual jury members broke the tie, and Cohen won the ticket to Paris.

Final – 11 February 1978
R/O	Artist	Song	Points	Place
1	Josie Katz	"Kmo pa'am"	23	9
2	Gidi Gov	"Shalosh balayla ba'ir"	14	12
3	Chedva Amrani and Pilpel Lavan	"Belev echad"	66	2
4	Nava Bruchin	"Bikashti"	20	10
5	Chani Elyakim, Motti Dichne, Dudu Zar and Dafna Armoni	"Akuma na"	20	10
6	Yehudit Ravitz	"Mishehu"	36	6
7	Aliza Aviv	"Ilani"	31	8
8	Gali Atari, Zvi Bums and Udi Spielman	"Nesich ha'halomot"	54	3
9	Izhar Cohen and the Alphabeta	"A-Ba-Ni-Bi"	66	1
10	Sherry	"Lama lo"	49	4
11	Irit Dotan	"Yom chadash"	35	7
12	Ariel Zilber and Lahakat Brosh	"Ten li koach"	46	5

== At Eurovision ==
Hirsh and Manor had initially intended for "A-Ba-Ni-Bi" (with a chorus in the Bet language, the Hebrew equivalent of Pig Latin) to compete in the IBA Children's Song Festival, but the duo realized that the song had potential for Eurovision success, leading them to submit it to the IBA's Eurovision selection committee and eventually win the pre-selection. Hirsh conducted the orchestra (as she had also done for Israel's debut in 1973), making her one of only three female conductors in the contest's history (alongside Sweden's Monica Dominique in 1973 and Switzerland's Anita Kerr in 1985), as well as choreographed the group's dance moves. On the night of the contest, Israel performed eighteenth, following Luxembourg and preceding Austria. Israel wound up becoming runaway winners, scoring eight points or higher from eleven of the nineteen countries that had the ability to vote for them and six sets of the maximum twelve points. Only one country (Sweden) failed to award the Israeli entry any points at all. They finished thirty-two points clear of Belgium and ensured that the contest would be held in Israel for the first time the following year. It was succeeded both as winner and as the Israeli representative by Milk and Honey with "Hallelujah". Israel reciprocated the Netherlands' 12 points, awarding Harmony and "'t Is OK" their sole twelve points.

=== Controversy with North African and Arab broadcasters ===
The 1978 contest was transmitted by a number of broadcasters from countries that didn't acknowledge the State of Israel, including several Arab countries (such as Algeria, Jordan, and the United Arab Emirates). Many chose to cut to a commercial during the Israeli performance, and when it became clear Israel was going to win, they ended their broadcasts early. Jordan Television (JTV) closed the show by broadcasting photos of flowers, and later announced that runner-up Belgium were the winners instead. The story goes that since the Israeli broadcaster didn't buy enough airtime and those watching through neighboring broadcasters like JTV never saw the end of the voting, many Israelis had no idea they had won until the following morning.

=== Voting ===
Points awarded to Israel
Score	Country
12 points	Belgium; Germany; Luxembourg; Netherlands; Switzerland; Turkey
10 points	Finland; Portugal
8 points	Austria; France; Ireland; Italy; Norway
7 points	
6 points	Denmark; Spain
5 points	Greece; United Kingdom
4 points	
3 points	Monaco
2 points	
1 point	

Points awarded by Israel
Score	Country
12 points	Netherlands
10 points	Greece
8 points	Monaco
7 points	Belgium
6 points	Spain
5 points	France
4 points	Denmark
3 points	Germany
2 points	United Kingdom
1 point	Switzerland

== After Eurovision ==
Izhar Cohen would go on to participate in the Israeli national final in 1982, 1985, 1987, and 1996. 1985 would prove successful, as he won the pre-selection and represented Israel with the song "Olé, Olé" and finished in fifth place.
