= France in the Eurovision Song Contest 1978 =

- Eurovision Song Contest 1978
- Participating broadcaster: Télévision Française 1 (TF1)
- Country: France
- Selection process: National final
- Selection date: 26 March 1978

Competing entry
- Song: "Il y aura toujours des violons"
- Artist: Joël Prévost
- Songwriters: Gérard Stern; Didier Barbelivien

Placement
- Final result: 3rd, 119 points

Participation chronology

France was represented at the Eurovision Song Contest 1978 with the song "Il y aura toujours des violons", composed by Gérard Stern, with lyrics by Didier Barbelivien, and performed by Joël Prévost. The French participating broadcaster, Télévision Française 1 (TF1), selected its entry through a national final. In addition, TF1 was also the host broadcaster and staged the event at the Palais des Congrès in Paris, after winning the previous edition with the song "L'Oiseau et l'Enfant" by Marie Myriam.

== Before Eurovision ==
=== National final ===
Télévision Française 1 (TF1) again opted for a public selection, with two semi-finals followed by the final on 26 March 1978, to select its entry for Eurovision.

==== Semi-finals ====
Each semi-final contained seven songs, with the top three in each going forward to the final. The qualifiers were chosen by public televoting. One of the successful participants in the first semi-final was 1967 French representative Noëlle Cordier.

Semi-final 1 – 12 March 1978
R/O	Artist	Song	Votes	Place	Result
1	Marie Azaro	"Sans lui"	4,725	4	—N/a
2	Jean-François Doll	"T'as l'air"	4,325	5	—N/a
3	Joël Prévost	"Il y aura toujours des violons"	6,511	2	Qualified
4	Alphabet	"Pour un train qui part"	3,986	6	—N/a
5	Noëlle Cordier	"Tombe l'eau"	4,932	3	Qualified
6	Patrick Lemaître	"Seul"	3,646	7	—N/a
7	Jean-Paul Cara	"Alors prends le soleil"	7,528	1	Qualified

Semi-final 2 – 19 March 1978
R/O	Artist	Song	Votes	Place	Result
1	Christian Villers	"Joue ta musique"	5,158	4	—N/a
2	Jean-Pierre Savelli	"C'était pour toi"	4,579	5	—N/a
3	Violette Vial	"Je te promets de revenir"	6,346	2	Qualified
4	Malvina	"Au revoir et peut-être à bientôt"	5,589	3	Qualified
5	Irvin and Indira	"Laisse pleurer les rivières"	8,445	1	Qualified
6	Caroline Grant	"Ne m'oublie pas"	4,173	6	—N/a
7	Lilyane Davis	"Dessine pour moi"	3,881	7	—N/a

==== Final ====
The final took place on 26 March 1978, hosted by Evelyn Leclercq. The winner was chosen by public televoting.

Final – 26 March 1978
R/O	Artist	Song	Votes	Place
1	Irvin and Indira	"Laisse pleurer les rivières"	8,915	2
2	Malvina	"Au revoir et peut-être à bientôt"	2,000	6
3	Violette Vial	"Je te promets de revenir"	2,621	5
4	Jean-Paul Cara	"Alors prends le soleil"	4,896	3
5	Joël Prévost	"Il y aura toujours des violons"	13,791	1
6	Noëlle Cordier	"Tombe l'eau"	2,870	4

== At Eurovision ==
On the night of the final Prévost performed 6th in the running order, following Portugal and preceding Spain. At the close of voting France had picked up 119 points, placing third of the 20 entries. It achieved the distinction of becoming only the second non-winning Eurovision song – following "Un, deux, trois" by Catherine Ferry in 1976, also for France – ever to receive votes from every other national jury, completing a hat-trick of consecutive contests in which every other national jury had voted for the French song, a record which still stands. The French jury awarded its 12 points to Belgium.

=== Voting ===
Points awarded to France
Score	Country
12 points	Austria
10 points	Germany; Italy; Sweden
8 points	Belgium; Denmark; Greece; United Kingdom
7 points	
6 points	Ireland; Netherlands; Switzerland
5 points	Israel; Monaco; Spain
4 points	Turkey
3 points	Norway
2 points	Finland; Portugal
1 point	Luxembourg

Points awarded by France
Score	Country
12 points	Belgium
10 points	Greece
8 points	Israel
7 points	Switzerland
6 points	Denmark
5 points	Ireland
4 points	Italy
3 points	Sweden
2 points	United Kingdom
1 point	Monaco
