= Linda Feller =

German singer (born 1966)

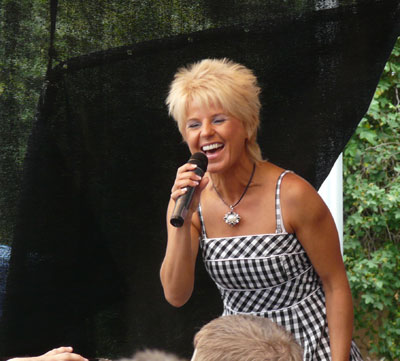
- Reim in 2008

Background information
- Born: Uta Weitzel; 23 September 1966 (age 59); Ohrdruf, East Germany
- Genres: Country; schlager
- Occupation: Singer

Uta Weitzel (born 23 September 1966), known professionally as Linda Feller, is a German country and schlager singer.

== Early life ==
Feller grew up in Ohrdruf with an older brother (who died in 1982). After graduating from school, she completed an apprenticeship in customer service at the commercial school in Erfurt.

== Career ==
Singer and entertainer Hartmut Schulze-Gerlach discovered Feller in 1985 on the television show Sprungbrett, which he hosted, and promoted her in the early years of her career. Feller turned to country music early on, interpreting Dolly Parton's song "Apple Jack" on an Amiga label recording, and from 1986 she was the lead singer of the band Country & Co.

In 1988, after performing at the Country Festival in Kloten, Switzerland, Feller did not return to East Germany and settled in Mainz. There, in 1990, her first solo self-titled album, was released. Since the early 1990s, she has been singing German country and schlager music. In 1992, Feller was the first artist to receive the "Singer of the Year" award from the newly founded German American Country Music Federation. She has since received this honor seven times. In 1998, she was invited to perform at the Grand Ole Opry in Nashville and, on 11 September 1998, became the first German artist to perform there, singing Parton's "Silver and Gold." The MDR (Mitteldeutscher Rundfunk) produced a television special about the event. In 2003, she performed at the Stodola Michala Tučneho country music festival in Hoštice u Volyně in the Czech Republic.

== Personal life ==
Feller has been married to her second husband since December 2014 and lives with him in Dresden-Cossebaude. From her first marriage (1985–2010) to the musician Benno Penßler-Beyer (1940–2019) she has a daughter.

== Discography ==
=== Albums ===
- 1990: Linda Feller
- 1992: Ich weiß genau was ich will
- 1993: Jetzt lieb ich dich erst recht
- 1994: Es wird höchste Zeit
- 1994: Stille Stunden am Kamin
- 1995: Du bist das Salz in meiner Suppe
- 1995: The Best Of – Vol.1
- 1995: Grundverschieden
- 1996: Überdosis Liebe
- 1997: Stations
- 1997: Jenseits des Horizonts
- 1998: Andre Mütter haben auch ein schönes Kind
- 1998: Linda Feller & Friends
- 1998: Einmal Nashville & zurück
- 1999: Weil du mich liebst
- 2000: Hey kleine Linda (with Hartmut Schulze-Gerlach)
- 2000: Jeder Tag kann ein Anfang sein
- 2000: Life is good
- 2001: Wenn überhaupt…
- 2001: Wintermärchenzeit
- 2002: Du tust mir so gut
- 2003: Pustekuchen
- 2004: Gala der Gefühle (with Jonny Hill)
- 2005: Country-Balladen & mehr
- 2005: Country-Hits Vol.1
- 2005: Langsam aber sicher
- 2007: Liebe ist wie ein Haus
- 2009: Stark
- 2011: Mein neuer Weg
- 2013: Frauenherz
- 2014: Und immer noch ich
- 2016: Frischer Wind
- 2020: 35 Jahre – Das Jubiläumsalbum
- 2024: Mein musikalisches Abenteuer · 40 Jahre Leidenschaft

=== Singles ===
- 1990: Du bist das Salz in meiner Suppe
- 1993: Minuten im Fieber
- 1994: Sonnenkinder sind wir alle
- 1994: Andre Mütter haben auch ein schönes Kind
- 1995: Keiner lügt so schlecht wie du
- 1997: Auch eine Frau kann durchaus ihren Mann steh’n
- 2000: Du weißt, was Frauen lieben
- 2003: Wenn du sagst goodbye
- 2005: Langsam aber sicher
- 2005: Die glücklichste Frau auf der Welt
- 2007: Liebe ist wie ein Haus
- 2008: Was uns einmal wichtig war
- 2009: Ich schlaf in deinem T-Shirt
- 2016: Unser Glück
- 2016: Billy Bob’s Texas
- 2017: Wir müssen damit aufhören
- 2018: Tausend bittersüße Tränen
- 2018: Nicht nur der Regen
- 2018: In meinem Wagen
- 2019: Mr. Texas
- 2020: Hätt’ ich ein andres Herz
- 2020: Liebe ist ein andres Wort für Wahnsinn
- 2020: Ab jetzt
- 2021: Mein letzter Freund (Duet with Hartmut Schulze-Gerlach)
