= Jean Vallée (singer) =

Belgian singer (1941–2014)

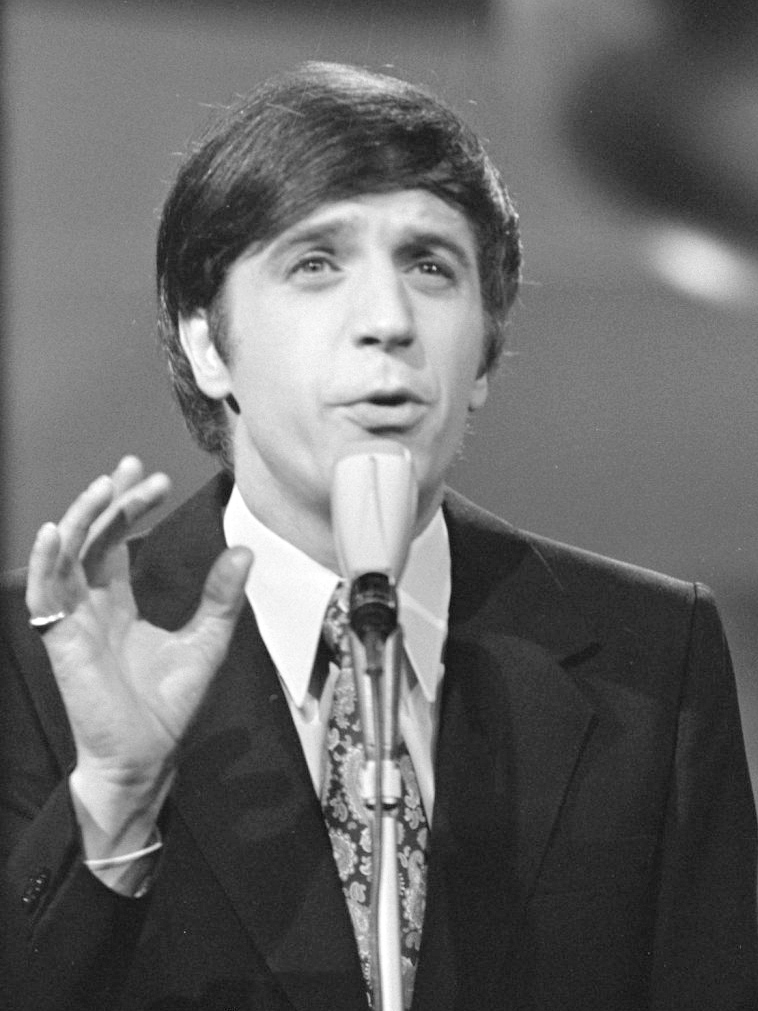
- Jean Vallée at the Eurovision Song Contest 1970

Background information
- Born: Paul Goeders; October 2, 1941; Verviers, Belgium
- Died: March 12, 2014 (aged 72) Clermont-sur-Berwinne, Belgium
- Genres: Chanson, pop
- Occupations: Singer, songwriter
- Years active: 1960s–2000s

Jean Vallée (born Paul Goeders in Verviers on 2 October 1941 – 12 March 2014, Clermont-sur-Berwinne) was a Belgian songwriter and performer. Vallée was appointed Knight of the Order of the Crown by HM Albert II in 1999.

== Career ==
In 1967 Vallée represented Belgium in the Festival of Rio, where Jacques Brel was a member of the jury. He represented Belgium for the Eurovision Song Contest 1970 with "Viens l'oublier" finishing eighth. He participated a second time in the Eurovision Song Contest 1978 with "L'amour ça fait chanter la vie", ending up second behind the Israeli entry. At the time, it was Belgium's best ever Eurovision finish. It was surpassed eight years later in 1986.

Awards and achievements
Preceded by Louis Neefs with "Jennifer Jennings"	Belgium in the Eurovision Song Contest; 1970	Succeeded by Jacques Raymond & Lily Castel with "Goeiemorgen, morgen"
Preceded by Dream Express with "A Million in One, Two, Three"	Belgium in the Eurovision Song Contest; 1978	Succeeded by Micha Marah with "Hey Nana"
