= Seija Simola =

Finnish singer (1944–2017)

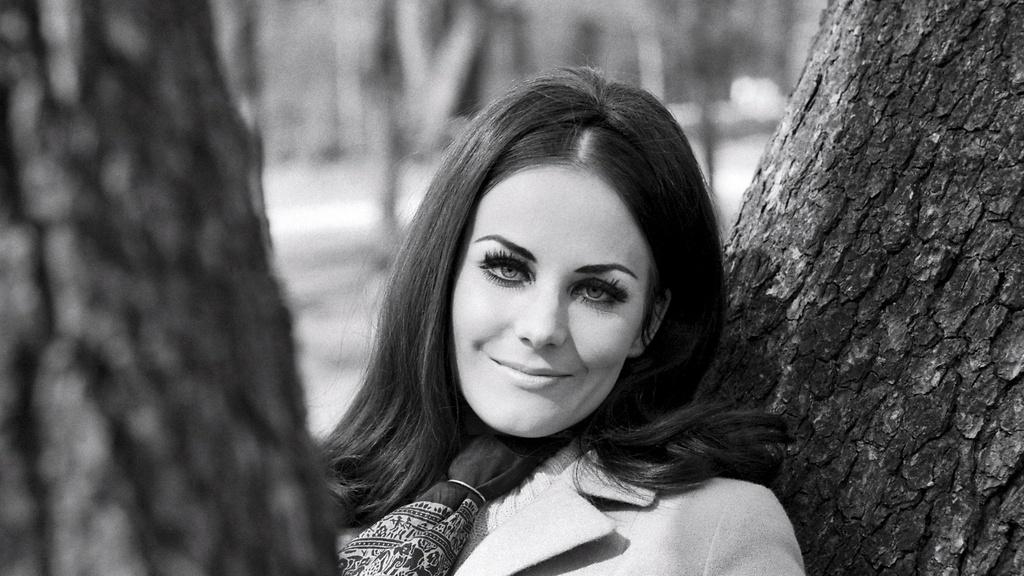
Simola in 1969

Seija Saara Maria Simola (25 September 1944 – 21 August 2017), married name Franzén, was a Finnish singer.

Simola was born in Helsinki. She began her musical career in the mid-1960s, in the band Eero Seija & Kristian Trio, and her debut solo album, Seija Simola 1, was released in 1970. The 1970s would be her most successful decade.

In 1978, she represented Finnish Broadcasting Company (Yle) at the Eurovision Song Contest 1978. There she performed the entry Anna rakkaudelle tilaisuus (Give love a chance), on 22 April 1978. The song finished in the 18th position with a total of two points. Despite this poor result, Simola continued a long and successful career in her native Finland. She died in Vantaa.

== Discography ==
- Trio (1970)
- Seija Simola 1 (1970)
- Aranjuez mon amour – näkemiin (1970)
- Rakkaustarina (1971)
- Seija (1973)
- Tunteen sain (1976)
- Seijan kauneimmat laulut (1977)
- Katseen kosketus (1979)
- Tunteet (1984)
- Ota kii – pidä mua (1985)
- Seija (1986)
- 20 suosikkia – Sulle silmäni annan (1995)
- Parhaat – Seija Simola (1995)
- 20 suosikkia – Rakkauden katse (2002)
- Sydämesi ääni (2005)

Preceded by Monica Aspelund with Lapponia	Finland in the Eurovision Song Contest; 1978	Succeeded by Katri Helena with Katson sineen taivaan
