= Norway in the Eurovision Song Contest 1978 =

- Eurovision Song Contest 1978
- Participating broadcaster: Norsk rikskringkasting (NRK)
- Country: Norway
- Selection process: Melodi Grand Prix 1978
- Selection date: 18 March 1978

Competing entry
- Song: "Mil etter mil"
- Artist: Jahn Teigen
- Songwriter: Kai Eide

Placement
- Final result: 20th, 0 points

Participation chronology

Norway was represented at the Eurovision Song Contest 1978 with the song "Mil etter mil", written by Kai Eide, and performed by Jahn Teigen. The Norwegian participating broadcaster, Norsk rikskringkasting (NRK), selected its entry through the Melodi Grand Prix 1978. Teigen would also represent Norway in 1982 and 1983.

"Mil etter mil" is famous both for Teigen's notoriously bizarre stage performance in Paris, and for being the first song ever to score nul-points under the 12 points voting system. (It was said that one of the reasons for the introduction of the current system in 1975 had been that the European Broadcasting Union had considered it unlikely in the extreme that any song would finish the evening with a zero with national juries now able to vote for ten songs, rather than the three or five which had been the case with previous ranking systems used in the 1960s and which had led to so many going home empty-handed.)

== Before Eurovision ==
=== Melodi Grand Prix 1978 ===
Norsk rikskringkasting (NRK) held the Melodi Grand Prix 1978 at its studios in Oslo, hosted by Egil Teige. The orchestra was conducted by Carsten Klouman. Eight songs took part in the final, with the winner chosen by a 9-member expert jury, which included Ellen Nikolaysen, who represented Norway in 1973 as part of the Bendik Singers and in 1975 as a solo artist; and Odd Børre, who represented Norway in 1968. The rankings of the jury members were used to calculate the result so the song with the lowest aggregate score was the winner.

18 March 1978
R/O	Artist	Song	Songwriters(s)	Points	Place
1	New Jordal Swingers	"Spilleman"	Eigil Berg; Ivar Hovden	50	6
2	Stein Ingebrigtsen	"Fortsett sangen"	Petter Hurlen; Espen Dietrichs	43	5
3	Maj-Britt Andersen	"Hør hva andre har fått til"	Kristian Lindeman	40	4
4	Anne Lise Gjøstøl	"Min sang"	Halvdan Presthus	20	2
5	Septimus	"La meg bli med deg"	Torbjørn Daleng; Gunnar Jørstad	37	3
6	Ingrid Elisabeth Johansen	"Den danseglade fruen"	Dag Kolsrud	52	7
7	Anita Skorgan and Georg Keller	"Prima Donna"	Svein Strugstad; Dag Nordtømme	67	8
8	Jahn Teigen	"Mil etter mil"	Kai Eide	15	1

Detailed Jury Votes
R/O	Song	K. Stokke	E. Nikolaysen	Ø. Thorsen	L. Dalseth	E. Iversen	K. Karlsen	O. Børre	A. Naumik	S. Børja	Total
1	"Spilleman"	5	8	7	8	8	3	3	4	4	50
2	"Fortsett sangen"	4	5	4	5	3	2	5	7	8	43
3	"Hor hva andre har fått till"	7	6	3	3	4	6	2	3	6	40
4	"Min sang"	1	2	1	1	1	5	6	2	1	20
5	"La meg bli med dig"	3	3	5	6	5	4	4	5	2	37
6	"Den danseglade fruen"	6	4	6	4	6	7	8	6	5	52
7	"Prima Donna"	8	7	8	7	7	8	7	8	7	67
8	"Mil etter mil"	2	1	2	2	2	1	1	1	3	15

== At Eurovision ==
The contest was broadcast on NRK Fjernsynet with commentary by Bjørn Scheele, and on NRK radio with commentary by Erik Heyerdahl.

On the night of the final Teigen performed second in the running order, following Ireland and preceding Italy. His stage performance appeared inexplicable at the time, involving braces-twanging and a huge split leap into the air which were completely at odds with the nature of the song. However it was later rumoured that Teigen was unhappy with the new arrangement the song had been given by NRK following the Melodi Grand Prix, and had performed in a deliberately inappropriate manner to vent his displeasure. Nevertheless the performance soon entered Eurovision legend, and is invariably included in montages put together to illustrate the contest's more absurd moments.

By the end of the night, no national jury had been persuaded to cast any votes in Norway's direction, and the country finished at the bottom of the scoreboard for a fifth time. The Norwegian jury awarded its 12 points to Ireland.

=== Voting ===
Norway did not receive any points at the 1978 Eurovision Song Contest.

Points awarded by Norway
Score	Country
12 points	Ireland
10 points	Sweden
8 points	Israel
7 points	Belgium
6 points	Italy
5 points	Switzerland
4 points	Monaco
3 points	France
2 points	Finland
1 point	Turkey

== After Eurovision ==
Far from being bitter about, or humiliated by, his Eurovision disaster, Teigen would subsequently use his notoriety very cleverly to become one of the most successful artists on the Norwegian musical scene, and made two further appearances at Eurovision in 1982 and 1983.
