= Denise Fabre =

French former television personality (born 1942)

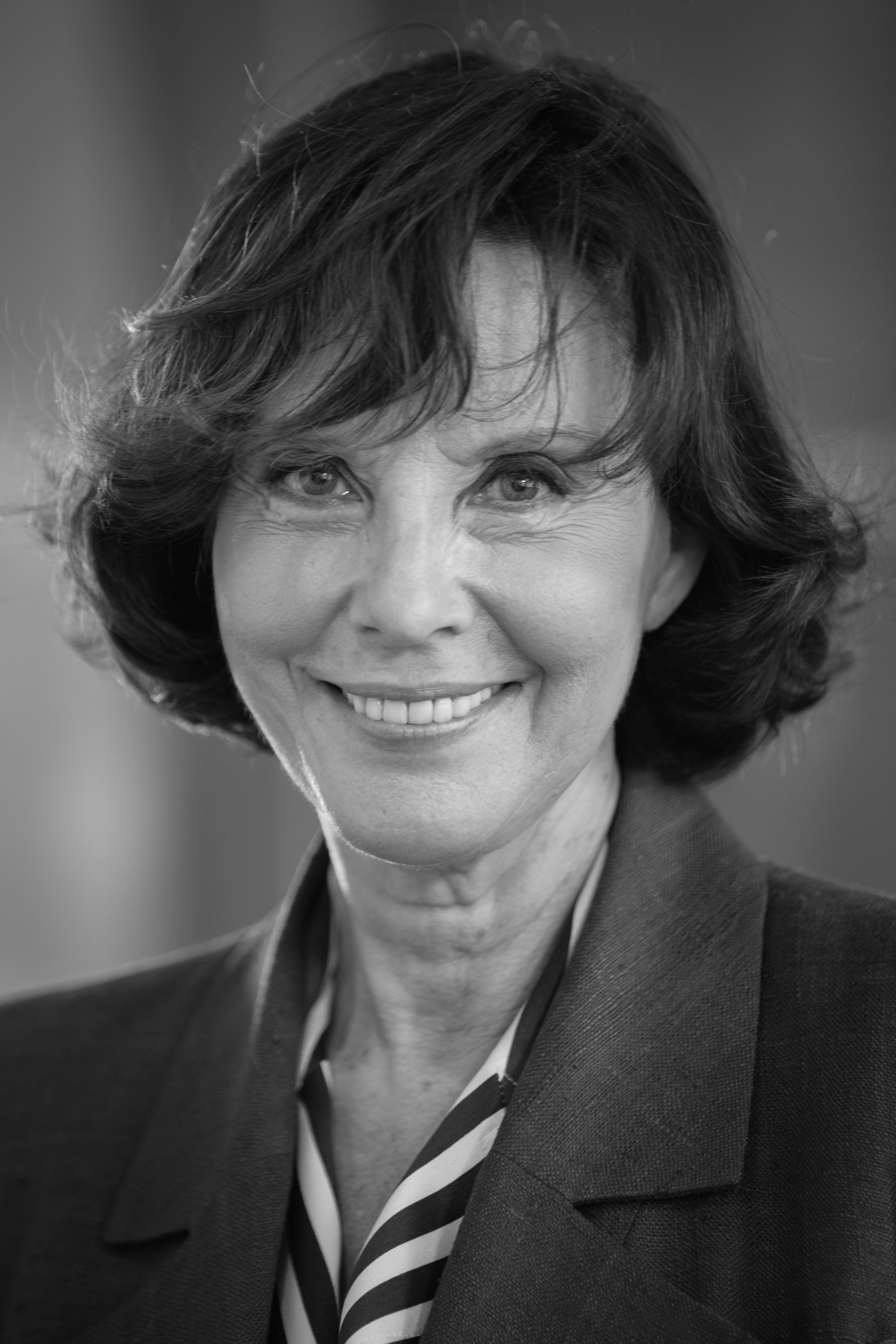
- Born: 5 September 1942 (age 82); Cagnes-sur-Mer, France
- Occupation(s): Television host; political appointee

Denise Fabre (born 5 September 1942) is a French former television personality, best known for her role as an in-vision continuity announcer. She is now municipal advisor to the presiding mayor of Nice, Christian Estrosi.

== Biography ==
Fabre, born in Cagnes-sur-Mer, began her career with Télé Monte Carlo in 1961 before she progressed to announcing work with Antenne 2 (now France 2) and most famously, TF1, where Fabre was chief announcer until live continuity was axed in 1992. She co-hosted the Eurovision Song Contest 1978 which was staged in Paris, as well as a variety of French television programmes during the 1970s and 1980s.

== See also ==
- List of Eurovision Song Contest presenters

Preceded by (United Kingdom) Angela Rippon	Eurovision Song Contest presenter (with Léon Zitrone); 1978	Succeeded by (Israel) Daniel Pe'er and Yardena Arazi
