= Switzerland in the Eurovision Song Contest 1978 =

- Eurovision Song Contest 1978
- Participating broadcaster: Swiss Broadcasting Corporation (SRG SSR)
- Country: Switzerland
- Selection process: Schweizer Finale
- Selection date: 18 January 1978

Competing entry
- Song: "Vivre"
- Artist: Carole Vinci
- Songwriters: Alain Morisod; Pierre Alain

Placement
- Final result: 9th, 65 points

Participation chronology

Switzerland was represented at the Eurovision Song Contest 1978 with the song "Vivre", composed by Alain Morisod, with lyrics by Pierre Alain, and performed by Carole Vinci. The Swiss participating broadcaster, the Swiss Broadcasting Corporation (SRG SSR), selected its entry for the contest through a national final.

== Before Eurovision ==
=== Schweizer Finale ===
The Swiss Broadcasting Corporation (SRG SSR) held a national final to select its entry for the Eurovision Song Contest 1978. The broadcaster received 95 total song submissions (53 in French, 29 in German, and 13 in Italian). In October 1977, a jury internally shortlisted 14 songs before ultimately selecting seven to take part in the selection, with five being performed in French and two in Italian. None of the songs in the selection were performed in German. Among the participants was Piera Martell— who represented Switzerland in 1974.

Swiss German and Romansh broadcaster Schweizer Fernsehen der deutschen und rätoromanischen Schweiz (SF DRS) staged the national final on 18 January 1978 at 21:05 CET in Zürich. It was presented by Christian Heeb, with Peter Jacques conducting the orchestra. Marie Myriam — who won Eurovision for France in 1977 — and the Günter Kallmann Choir made guest appearances.

Participating entries
Broadcaster	Artist(s)	Song	Songwriter(s)		Language
Broadcaster	Artist(s)	Song	Composer	Lyricist	Language
TSR	Françoise Rime	"Quand l'amour rencontre un jour une chanson"	Alain Morisod	Jean-Jacques Egli	French
TSR	Piera Martell	"Hier, Pierre"	Pierre Cavalli	Max Rüeger	French
TSR	Isabelle Alba	"Colombe chante"	Pierre Alain		French
TSR	Carole Vinci	"Vivre"	Alain Morisod	Pierre Alain	French
TSR	Alain Morisod Group	"Hey! Le musicien"	Alain Morisod		French
TSI	Marisa Frigerio	"Il chiromante"	Raphael Gibardi		Italian
TSI	Salvo Ingrassia	"Solo tu"	Ambros Baumann		Italian

The voting consisted of regional public votes which were sent to the three divisions of SRG SSR (DRS, TSR, TSI: German, French, and Italian speaking, respectively), a press jury, and a jury of music experts. Applications for viewers from Switzerland and Liechtenstein to join the regional juries were sent via postcard until 10 January, and 50 viewers from each canton were randomly selected to cast their votes to their broadcaster divisions via phone call. Additionally, one random voter in the public jury would be drawn to be invited to attend the Eurovision Song Contest as an audience member along with a companion. The selected voter was Therese Blaser from Bärau. The winner was the song "Vivre", composed by Alain Morisod, with lyrics by Pierre Alain, and performed by Carole Vinci.

Final — 18 January 1978
R/O	Artist(s)	Song	Regional Juries			Press Jury	Expert Jury	Total	Place
R/O	Artist(s)	Song	DRS	TSR	TSI	Press Jury	Expert Jury	Total	Place
1	Françoise Rime	"Quand l'amour rencontre un jour une chanson"	4	4	4	5	6	23	3
2	Piera Martell	"Hier, Pierre"	3	2	2	2	2	11	6
3	Isabelle Alba	"Colombe chante"	2	6	1	1	1	11	6
4	Marisa Frigerio	"Il chiromante"	1	1	3	3	8	16	5
5	Carole Vinci	"Vivre"	8	5	8	8	3	32	1
6	Salvo Ingrassia	"Solo tu"	5	3	5	4	4	21	4
7	Alain Morisod Group	"Hey! Le musicien"	6	8	6	6	5	31	2

=== Releases ===
Carole Vinci first recorded and released "Vivre" in French and German under the title "Vivre, Vivre Heisst Leben" in 1978. In 1998, the song was featured in a CD compilation titled "Concours Eurovision De La Chanson 1956-1998: Schweizer Beiträge", which compiled every Swiss Eurovision entry at the time.

Most of the other songs in the selection were also commercially released that same year. Salvo Ingrassia first released "Solo tu" the year before. Marisa Frigerio and Piera Martell did not commercially release their songs. The full selection has been archived by SRG SSR and is able to be watched online.

== At Eurovision ==
At the Eurovision Song Contest 1978, held at the Palais des Congrès in Paris, the Swiss entry was the ninth entry of the night following the United Kingdom and preceding Belgium. The Swiss conductor at the contest was Daniel Janin. At the close of voting, Switzerland had received 65 points in total; finishing in ninth place out of twenty countries.

The contest was broadcast on SRG SSR via TV DRS (Note: Broadcast through a second audio programme on TSI) (with commentary from Theodor Haller) in German-speaking Switzerland,, TSR (with commentary from Georges Hardy) and RSR 1 (with commentary from Robert Burnier) in Romandy, and TSI in Ticino.

=== Voting ===
Each participating broadcaster assembled a jury panel with at least eleven members. The jurors awarded 1-8, 10, and 12 points to their top ten songs. Until 1980, the votes were given in the order the awarded songs were performed in, rather than in ascending numerical order.

Points awarded to Switzerland
Score	Country
12 points	
10 points	Austria
8 points	Luxembourg; Netherlands
7 points	Belgium; France
6 points	Germany
5 points	Norway
4 points	Spain
3 points	Denmark
2 points	Monaco; United Kingdom
1 point	Finland; Israel; Italy

Points awarded by Switzerland
Score	Country
12 points	Israel
10 points	Belgium
8 points	Spain
7 points	Ireland
6 points	France
5 points	Monaco
4 points	Greece
3 points	Germany
2 points	United Kingdom
1 point	Italy
