= Serpil Barlas =

Turkish actress and singer (1957–2021)

- Born: Serpil Polat; 1957; Istanbul, Turkey
- Died: 20 February 2021 (aged 63–64); Beşiktaş, Turkey
- Occupations: Actress; Singer

Serpil Barlas (1957 – 20 February 2021) was a Turkish actress and singer.

== Biography ==
Serpil Barlas was born in Istanbul in 1957. Performing under her birth name Serpil Polat, she released several singles in the mid-1970s. In 1978, she competed in the Turkish national selection for the Eurovision Song Contest 1978, performing the song "Yaşamana Bak" with Grup İkinci Baskı.

Serpil Barlas died of heart failure in Beşiktaş on 20 February 2021 at the age of 64. She was buried in Feriköy Cemetery on 22 February.

== Discography ==
=== Singles ===
Year	Title	B-side / Notes	Label	Ref.
1976	Hangisi	İlk ve Son	Yonca Plak	
1976	Oldu Olanlar	Yandım Aşkınla Ben	Yonca Plak	
1977	Biricik Sevgilim	Ne Olur Ne Olmaz	Elenor Plak	
1978	Yaşamana Bak	Instrumental version	Philips	
1979	Farkın Kalmadı	Sensiz Bir Hiçim	Yonca Plak	

=== Albums ===
Year	Album	Label	Ref.
1994	Serpil’in Dünyası	Uzelli	
1998	Efkarım Tarumar	Özlem Müzik	

=== Other recordings ===
These tracks are confirmed through compilation albums, reissues, and digital releases:

Year	Title	Release type	Album / Compilation	Label	Ref.
1976	"Oldu Olanlar"	Compilation appearance	Türkçe Pop 70'ler	Odeon / Philips	
1976	"Yandım Aşkınla Ben"	Compilation appearance	Türkçe Pop 70'ler	Odeon / Philips	
1977	"Biricik Sevgilim"	Digital reissue	Biricik Sevgilim – Single	Elenor Müzik (digital)	
1977	"Ne Olur Ne Olmaz"	Digital reissue	Biricik Sevgilim – Single	Elenor Müzik (digital)	
1978	"Yaşamana Bak"	Digital release	Yaşamana Bak – Single	Philips (digital)	
1978	"Yaşamana Bak (Instrumental)"	Digital release	Yaşamana Bak – Single	Philips (digital)	
1994	"Sahipsiz Çocuklar"	Album track	Serpil’in Dünyası	Uzelli	
1994	"Benim Adım İnsan"	Album track	Serpil’in Dünyası	Uzelli	

== Filmography ==
=== Television ===
Year	Title	Role	Notes	Ref.
1975	Bizim Aile	Herself / Singer	Performed songs for the film's soundtrack, widely aired on TV thereafter	
1977	Hababam Sınıfı Uyanıyor	Singer (uncredited)	Music performance used in TV-broadcast versions	
