= Elpida (singer) =

Greek singer

- Born: Elpida Karayiannopoulou; October 1, 1949 (age 76); Spercheiada, Greece
- Occupation: Singer-songwriter
- Years active: 1970–1997

Elpida Karayiannopoulou (Greek: Ελπίδα Καραγιαννοπούλου; born October 1, 1949) is a Greek singer who was one of the most successful singers in Greece and the Greek diaspora in the 1970s and 1980s.

Known professionally as just Elpida, she released 17 original albums in her 25-year recording history, and regularly topped fever charts run by the Greek state broadcaster, Ellinikí Radiofonía Tileórasi (ERT). Internationally, she was known for being a two-time entrant to the Eurovision Song Contest, representing Greece in 1979 with the song "Sokrati" which placed 8th and Cyprus in 1986 with "Tora zo" which came 20th (and last).

== Early life ==
Elpida Karayiannopoulou was born in Spercheiada, Greece; at 14, she moved to Athens with her two older brothers to study. Upon finishing school, she wished to be an architect, but instead began to study topography while working at the same time.

== Career ==
Elpida began her singing career in 1970 when she became the singer of an orchestra and subsequently recorded an album with them. In 1972, she participated in Thessaloniki Music Festival with the song "Den Ton Eida" (Δεν τον είδα, I didn't see him) and was introduced to the public. The same year she also recorded her first solo album, which was presented live with fellow singers George Dalaras, Giannis Parios, Tolis Voskopoulos, Giorgos Marinos, Giannis Poulopoulos, Haris Alexiou, and Grigoris Bithikotsis. In 1973, ERT deemed Elpida the most popular singer in the country at that time.

Elpida went on to take part in 13 festivals similar to those of Thessaloniki including Tokyo in 1974 where she placed second and the winner of Viña del Mar Festival in Chile in 1975 with the song "Pos Pes Mou Pos". She received various awards such as the "Reward of Interpretation" in Poland, and a reward for television in Bulgaria. She also made a lot of television appearances in Latin America, Spain, Germany, England, the Netherlands, the Scandinavian Countries and made several television appearances in Israel.

In 1979, Elpida was chosen to take part in the Eurovision Song Contest to represent Greece. She sang the song "Sokrati" (Σωκράτη, Socrates) and placed eighth, receiving 69 points from the 19 participating countries. She released an album which reached gold sales in Israel and reached No. 6 in the local charts in Portugal. Seven years later, she appeared at Eurovision once more, in 1986, but representing Cyprus. She sang "Tora zo" (Τώρα ζω, Now I Live), but with less success than in 1979, only garnering four points, and placing 20th (last).

1988 saw the release of the album Flas from which the song "Opos Se Thelo S'oneirevomai" became a radio hit. In 1994, her sixteenth studio album was released titled Mes Ti Nihta Hathika, with music by Thanasis Kargidis and Panos Falaras.

== Personal life ==
Elpida married in 1979 and gave birth to her first child, a girl named Hera, in 1980. Her second child, Stephanos, was born in 1985 and led to her absence from the music industry for four years as she spent time with her family.

== Discography ==
- 1972: Den Ton Eida
- 1973: Elpida
- 1975: Koita To Fos
- 1975: Epi Skinis
- 1976: Elpida
- 1978: Borei
- 1979: Sokrati
- 1979: Elpida
- 1979: Ta Oraiotera Tragoudia Mou (compilation)
- 1981: Me Tin Elpida
- 1983: Me Logia Apla
- 1987: Flas
- 1988: 16 Apo Ta Oraiotera Tragoudia (compilation)
- 1989: Ela na Paizoume
- 1990: Tragoudontas Tis Epohes, 10
- 1990: Selida 16
- 1992: To Palio Na Legetai
- 1994: Mes Sti Nihta Hathika
- 1994: "Zileia"/"Kameno Harti" (maxi single)
- 1995: To Lathos Kai To Pathos
- 1997: Me Tragoudia Kai Logia ta Oraiotera Mou, 1972–87 (compilation)

Preceded by Tania Tsanaklidou with Charlie Chaplin	Greece in the Eurovision Song Contest; 1979	Succeeded by Anna Vissi with Autostop

Preceded by Lia Vissi with To katalava arga	Cyprus in the Eurovision Song Contest; 1986	Succeeded by Alexia with Aspro mavro
