= Eurovision Song Contest 1978 =

International song competition

Date and venue
- Final: 22 April 1978
- Venue: Palais des Congrès; Paris, France

Organisation
- Organiser: European Broadcasting Union (EBU)
- Scrutineer: Frank Naef

Production
- Host broadcaster: Télévision Française 1 (TF1)
- Director: Bernard Lion
- Musical director: François Rauber
- Presenters: Denise Fabre; Léon Zitrone

Participants
- Number of entries: 20
- Returning countries: Denmark; Turkey
- Participation map: Competing countries Countries that participated in the past but not in 1978

Vote
- Voting system: Each country awarded 12, 10, 8-1 points to their 10 favourite songs
- Winning song: Israel "A-Ba-Ni-Bi"

The Eurovision Song Contest 1978 was the 23rd edition of the Eurovision Song Contest, held on 22 April 1978 at the Grand Amphitheatre of the Palais des Congrès in Paris, France, and presented by Denise Fabre and Léon Zitrone. It was organised by the European Broadcasting Union (EBU) and host broadcaster Télévision Française 1 (TF1), who staged the event after winning the 1977 contest for France with the song "L'Oiseau et l'Enfant" by Marie Myriam. This was the first time that more than one presenter had hosted the contest, and the first to have a male presenter since the inaugural 1956 contest.

Broadcasters from twenty countries participated, the highest number of competing countries in the history of the competition at the time. Denmark and Turkey both returned to the contest. Denmark had not participated since 1966, 12 years before.

The winner was Israel with the song "A-Ba-Ni-Bi" by Izhar Cohen and the Alphabeta. This was Israel's first victory in the contest, and it was also the first winning song to be performed in a Semitic language. It was also the only winning song to be conducted by a woman, Nurit Hirsh. Belgium, France, Monaco and Ireland rounded out the top five, with Belgium's runner-up finish being their best result in the competition at that point. Norway finished last for the fifth time, gaining the first nul points after the new voting system was implemented in 1975.

== Location ==
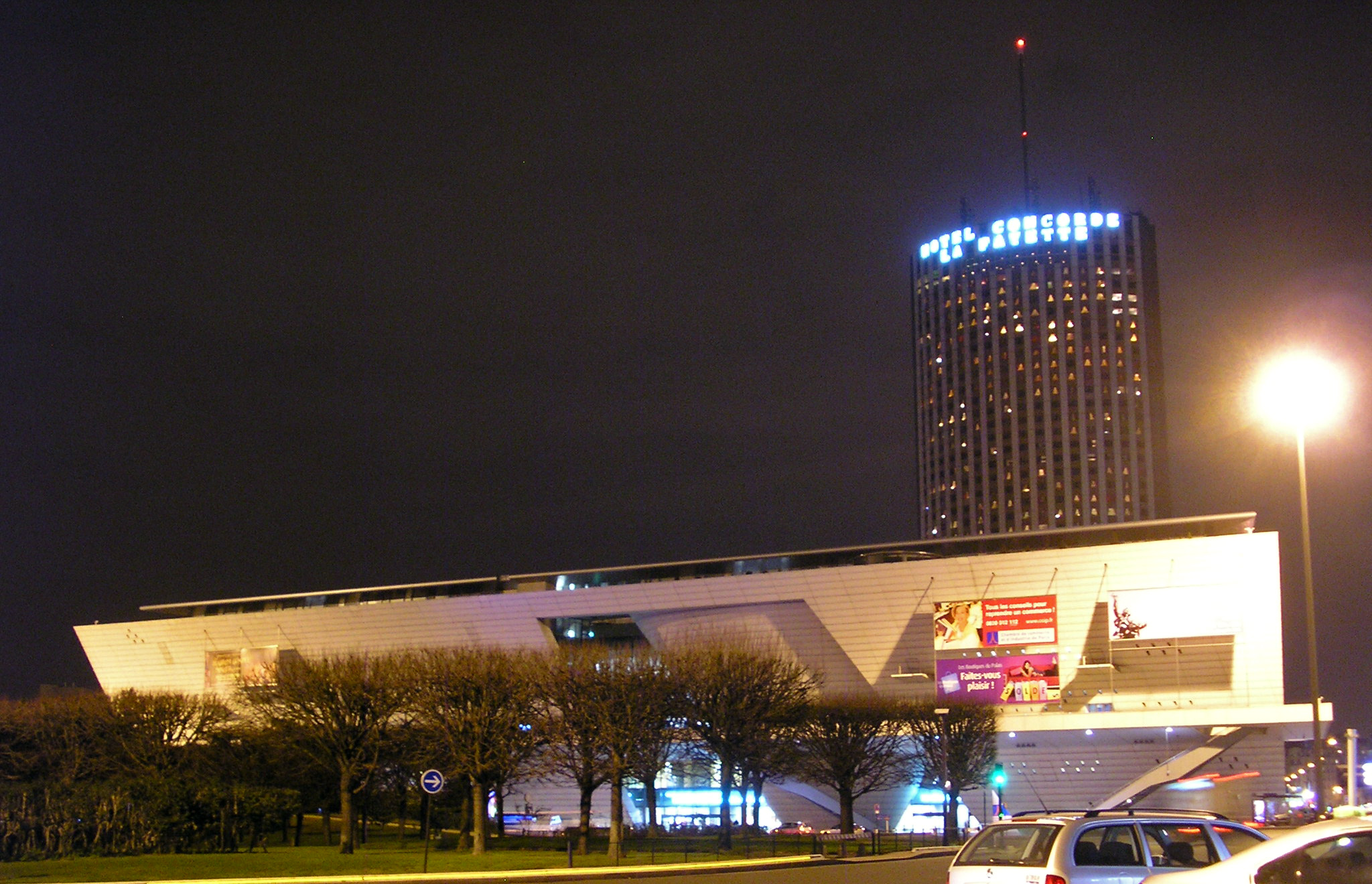
Palais des Congrès, Paris – host venue of the 1978 contest.

Télévision Française 1 (TF1) staged the contest at the Palais des congrès de Paris, a multi propose venue in the 17th arrondissement of Paris. Designed by French architect Guillaume Gillet, the venue was inaugurated in 1974.

== Participants ==
Denmark returned to the competition after having been absent for twelve years, while Turkey did so after missing out two years. This meant that, for the first time, the contest had twenty entries competing.

Several of the performing artists had previously competed as lead artists representing the same country in past editions: Jean Vallée had represented Belgium in 1970; and Norbert Niedermeyer as part of Springtime had represented Austria in 1972 as part of Milestones. In addition, Ireen Sheer representing Germany, had represented Luxembourg in 1974.

Eurovision Song Contest 1978 participants
Country	Broadcaster	Artist	Song	Language	Songwriter(s)	Conductor
Austria	ORF	Springtime	"Mrs. Caroline Robinson"	German	Gerhard Markel; Walter Markel; Norbert Niedermayer	Richard Oesterreicher
Belgium	RTBF	Jean Vallée	"L'amour ça fait chanter la vie"	French	Jean Vallée	Jean Musy
Denmark	DR	Mabel	"Boom Boom"	Danish	Christian Have; Andy Kulmbak; Peter Nielsen; Michael Trempenau	Helmer Olesen
Finland	YLE	Seija Simola	"Anna rakkaudelle tilaisuus"	Finnish	Reijo Karvonen; Seija Simola	Ossi Runne
France	TF1	Joël Prévost	"Il y aura toujours des violons"	French	Didier Barbelivien; Gérard Stern	Alain Goraguer
Germany	SWF (Note: On behalf of the German public broadcasting consortium ARD)	Ireen Sheer	"Feuer"	German	Jean Frankfurter; John Möring	Jean Frankfurter
Greece	ERT	Tania Tsanaklidou	"Charlie Chaplin" (Τσάρλυ Τσάπλιν)	Greek	Sakis Tsilikis; Yiannis Xanthoulis	Haris Andreadis
Ireland	RTÉ	Colm C. T. Wilkinson	"Born to Sing"	English	Colm C. T. Wilkinson	Noel Kelehan
Israel	IBA	Izhar Cohen and the Alphabeta	"A-Ba-Ni-Bi" (א-ב-ני-בי)	Hebrew	Nurit Hirsh; Ehud Manor	Nurit Hirsh
Italy	RAI	Ricchi e Poveri	"Questo amore"	Italian	Sergio Bardotti; Dario Farina; Mauro Lusini	Nicola Samale
Luxembourg	CLT	Baccara	"Parlez-vous français ?"	French	Frank Dostal; Rolf Soja; Peter Zentner	Rolf Soja
Monaco	TMC	Caline and Olivier Toussaint	"Les Jardins de Monaco"	French	Jean Albertini; Didier Barbelivien; Paul de Senneville; Olivier Toussaint	Yvon Rioland
Netherlands	NOS	Harmony	"'t Is OK"	Dutch	Dick Bakker; Toon Gispen; Eddy Ouwens	Harry van Hoof
Norway	NRK	Jahn Teigen	"Mil etter mil"	Norwegian	Kai Eide	Carsten Klouman
Portugal	RTP	Gemini	"Dai li dou"	Portuguese	Victor Maméde; Carlos Quintas	Thilo Krasmann
Spain	TVE	José Vélez	"Bailemos un vals"	Spanish	Ramón Arcusa; Manuel de la Calva	Ramón Arcusa
Sweden	SR	Björn Skifs	"Det blir alltid värre framåt natten"	Swedish	Peter Himmelstrand	Bengt Palmers
Switzerland	SRG SSR	Carole Vinci	"Vivre"	French	Pierre Alain; Alain Morisod	Daniel Janin
Turkey	TRT	Nilüfer and Nazar	"Sevince"	Turkish	Hulki Aktunç; Dağhan Baydur; Onno Tunç	Onno Tunç
United Kingdom	BBC	Co-Co	"The Bad Old Days"	English	Stephanie De Sykes; Stuart Slater	Alyn Ainsworth

Eurovision Song Contest 1978 – Participation summaries by country
- Austria; Belgium; Denmark; Finland; France; Germany; Greece; Ireland; Israel; Italy; Luxembourg; Monaco; Netherlands; Norway; Portugal; Spain; Sweden; Switzerland; Turkey; United Kingdom

== Format ==
The postcards were filmed live, featuring the artists making their way to the stage. They took a corridor, then an elevator. Leaving the lift, they were greeted by the previous participants and then made their entrances to the stage. The camera also made several shots of the audience, notably Jane Birkin and Serge Gainsbourg.

Each song was accompanied by a 45-piece orchestra.

The Swedish participant Björn Skifs was unhappy with the rule that every country would have to perform in their native language. He planned to sing in English anyway, but changed his mind at the last moment, causing him to completely forget the lyrics. He therefore sang the first few lines in gibberish before finding the words again.

The Israeli winning song was a love song sung in the Hebrew equivalent of Ubbi dubbi (the title is an expansion of the Hebrew word ani, meaning "I"). The fact that the song won caused problems for several North African and Middle-Eastern broadcasters that were televising the contest, even though they were not participating. According to John Kennedy O'Connor in his book The Eurovision Song Contest: The Official History, when Israel became the clear winners during the voting, most of the Arabic stations ended their transmission of the contest. Jordan Television finished the show with a photo of a bunch of daffodils on screen, later announcing that the Belgian entry (which finished second) was the winner.

== Contest overview ==
The contest was held on 22 April 1978, beginning at 21:30 (CEST).

Fears of terrorist attacks like at the Summer Olympics 1972 in Munich and of stage invasions like in 1964 meant that security measures in and around the Palais des Congrès were particularly tight: 200 police officers, some of them as undercover agents, tried to prevent any potential incidents. Spectators had to go through metal detectors upon arrival at the Palais des Congrès.

In addition to his duties as a host together with Denise Fabre, Léon Zitrone also served as commentator for France, in an own commentary box backstage.

Results of the Eurovision Song Contest 1978
R/O	Country	Artist	Song	Points	Place
1	Ireland	Colm C. T. Wilkinson	"Born to Sing"	86	5
2	Norway	Jahn Teigen	"Mil etter mil"	0	20
3	Italy	Ricchi e Poveri	"Questo amore"	53	12
4	Finland	Seija Simola	"Anna rakkaudelle tilaisuus"	2	18
5	Portugal	Gemini	"Dai li dou"	5	17
6	France	Joël Prévost	"Il y aura toujours des violons"	119	3
7	Spain	José Vélez	"Bailemos un vals"	65	9
8	United Kingdom	Co-Co	"The Bad Old Days"	61	11
9	Switzerland	Carole Vinci	"Vivre"	65	9
10	Belgium	Jean Vallée	"L'amour ça fait chanter la vie"	125	2
11	Netherlands	Harmony	"'t Is OK"	37	13
12	Turkey	Nilüfer and Nazar	"Sevince"	2	18
13	Germany	Ireen Sheer	"Feuer"	84	6
14	Monaco	Caline and Olivier Toussaint	"Les Jardins de Monaco"	107	4
15	Greece	Tania Tsanaklidou	"Charlie Chaplin"	66	8
16	Denmark	Mabel	"Boom Boom"	13	16
17	Luxembourg	Baccara	"Parlez-vous français ?"	73	7
18	Israel	Izhar Cohen and the Alphabeta	"A-Ba-Ni-Bi"	157	1
19	Austria	Springtime	"Mrs. Caroline Robinson"	14	15
20	Sweden	Björn Skifs	"Det blir alltid värre framåt natten"	26	14

=== Spokespersons ===
Each participating broadcaster appointed a spokesperson who was responsible for announcing the votes for its respective country via telephone. Known spokespersons at the 1978 contest are listed below.

- Finland – Kaarina Pönniö
- Germany – Sigi Harreis
- Spain – Matías Prats Luque
- Sweden – Sven Lindahl
- Turkey – Meral Savcı
- United Kingdom – Colin Berry

== Detailed voting results ==
Detailed voting results
		Total score	Ireland	Norway	Italy	Finland	Portugal	France	Spain	United Kingdom	Switzerland	Belgium	Netherlands	Turkey	Germany	Monaco	Greece	Denmark	Luxembourg	Israel	Austria	Sweden
Contestants	Ireland	86		12		3		5			7	10		10	5		10		10		6	8
Contestants	Norway	0																				
Contestants	Italy	53	10	6			1	4	8	6	1	1		1	2	8	2		3			
Contestants	Finland	2		2																		
Contestants	Portugal	5			4				1													
Contestants	France	119	6	3	10	2	2		5	8	6	8	6	4	10	5	8	8	1	5	12	10
Contestants	Spain	65				7					8	2	4	7		4	6	12	2	6	7	
Contestants	United Kingdom	61	3				6	2	3		2	4	2	6	8	7	3		5	2	5	3
Contestants	Switzerland	65		5	1	1		7	4	2		7	8		6	2		3	8	1	10	
Contestants	Belgium	125	12	7	6	6	4	12	2	12	10		5		3	12	12		7	7	4	4
Contestants	Netherlands	37			5					3					4	1		5	6	12		1
Contestants	Turkey	2		1						1												
Contestants	Germany	84	1		3	12	7		10		3	5	7	8		10	7	1		3		7
Contestants	Monaco	107	4	4	7	8	5	1		10	5	6	10	5	7		4	10		8	1	12
Contestants	Greece	66	7		2	5	8	10	7		4							4	4	10	3	2
Contestants	Denmark	13						6					1							4	2	
Contestants	Luxembourg	73	2		12		12		12	7		3	3	2		6	1	7				6
Contestants	Israel	157	8	8	8	10	10	8	6	5	12	12	12	12	12	3	5	6	12		8	
Contestants	Austria	14					3							3	1			2				5
Contestants	Sweden	26	5	10		4		3		4												

=== 12 points ===
Below is a summary of all 12 points in the final:

N.	Contestant	Nation(s) giving 12 points
6	Israel	Belgium, Germany, Luxembourg, Netherlands, Switzerland, Turkey
5	Belgium	France, Greece, Ireland, Monaco, United Kingdom
3	Luxembourg	Italy, Portugal, Spain
1	France	Austria
1	Germany	Finland
1	Ireland	Norway
1	Monaco	Sweden
1	Netherlands	Israel
1	Spain	Denmark

== Broadcasts ==
Each participating broadcaster was required to relay the contest via its networks. Non-participating EBU member broadcasters were also able to relay the contest as "passive participants". Broadcasters were able to send commentators to provide coverage of the contest in their own native language and to relay information about the artists and songs to their television viewers. TF1 provided 29 commentary boxes in the auditorium for foreign broadcasters.

In addition to the participating countries, the contest was also reportedly broadcast in 17 other countries, including Algeria, Iceland, Jordan, Morocco, Tunisia, and Yugoslavia; in Czechoslovakia, East Germany, Hungary, Poland, and the Soviet Union via Intervision; and in Hong Kong, Japan, and the United Arab Emirates. No official accounts of the viewing figures are known to exist; an estimate given in French press outlets ahead of the contest put the expected audience at around 350 million viewers worldwide, while media reports put viewing figures between 500 and 600 million.

Known details on the broadcasts in each country, including the specific broadcasting stations and commentators are shown in the tables below.

Broadcasters and commentators in participating countries
Country	Broadcaster	Channel(s)	Commentator(s)	Ref(s)
Austria	ORF	FS2	Ernst Grissemann	
Belgium	RTBF	RTBF1	Paule Herreman	
Belgium	RTBF	RTBF 2		
Belgium	BRT	TV1	Luc Appermont	
Belgium	BRT	BRT 1	Jan Schoukens	
Denmark	DR	DR TV	Jørgen de Mylius	
Finland	YLE	TV1		
Finland	YLE	Rinnakkaisohjelma		
France	TF1		Léon Zitrone	
Germany	ARD	Deutsches Fernsehen	Werner Veigel	
Greece	ERT	ERT, A Programma		
Ireland	RTÉ	RTÉ	Larry Gogan	
Ireland	RTÉ	RTÉ Radio	Liam Devally	
Israel	IBA	Israeli Television, Reshet Bet		
Italy	RAI	Rete Due, (Note: Deferred broadcast at 21:55 (CET)) Rai Radio 2	Tullio Grazzini	
Luxembourg	CLT	RTL Télé-Luxembourg	Jacques Navadic and André Torrent	
Monaco	Télé Monte-Carlo			
Netherlands	NOS	Nederland 2	Willem Duys	
Norway	NRK	NRK Fjernsynet	Bjørn Scheele	
Norway	NRK	NRK (Note: Deferred broadcast at 23:10 (CET))	Erik Heyerdahl	
Portugal	RTP	I Programa	Eládio Clímaco	
Portugal	RDP	RDP Programa 1		
Spain	TVE	TVE 1	Miguel de los Santos	
Spain	RNE	RNE Canarias		
Sweden	SR	TV1	Ulf Elfving	
Sweden	SR	SR P3	Kent Finell	
Switzerland	SRG SSR	TV DRS (Note: Broadcast through a second audio programme on TSI)	Theodor Haller	
Switzerland	SRG SSR	TSR	Georges Hardy	
Switzerland	SRG SSR	TSI		
Switzerland	SRG SSR	RSR 1	Robert Burnier	
Turkey	TRT	TRT Televizyon		
United Kingdom	BBC	BBC1	Terry Wogan	
United Kingdom	BBC	BBC Radio 2 (Note: Simulcast on BBC Radio 1, BBC Radio Birmingham, BBC Radio Brighton, BBC Radio Carlisle, BBC Radio Cleveland, BBC Radio Derby, BBC Radio Humberside, BBC Radio Leeds, BBC Radio Leicester, BBC Radio London, BBC Radio Manchester, BBC Radio Merseyside, BBC Radio Newcastle, BBC Radio Nottingham, BBC Radio Oxford, BBC Radio Solent, and BBC Radio Stoke.)	Ray Moore	

Broadcasters and commentators in non-participating countries
Country	Broadcaster	Channel(s)	Commentator(s)	Ref(s)
Bulgaria	BT	BT 1 (Note: Delayed broadcast on 29 April 1978 at 23:45 (EET))		
Cyprus	CyBC	RIK		
Hong Kong	TVB	TVB Pearl (Note: Deferred broadcast the following day at 10:30 (HKT))		
Hong Kong	RTV	RTV-2 (Note: Deferred broadcast the following day at 19:00 (HKT))		
Hungary	MTV	MTV2 (Note: Delayed broadcast on 23 May 1978 at 21:40 (CET))		
Iceland	RÚV	Sjónvarpið (Note: Delayed broadcast on 30 April 1978 at 21:20 (WET))	Ragna Ragnars	
Jordan	JTV	JTV2 (Note: Contest broadcast interrupted during the voting sequence by the broadcaster)		
Netherlands Antilles	ATM	TeleCuraçao (Note: Delayed broadcast on 6 May 1978 at 22:30 (ADT))		
Poland	TP	TP1 (Note: Deferred broadcast in a shortened format at 00:50 (CET))		
Yugoslavia	JRT	TV Beograd 1		
Yugoslavia	JRT	TV Koper-Capodistria		
Yugoslavia	JRT	TV Ljubljana 1 (Note: Deferred broadcast the following day at 15:30 (CET))		
Yugoslavia	JRT	TV Zagreb 1		

== See also ==
- OTI Festival 1978
