= Joël Prévost =

- Born: Richard-Jacques Bonay; 16 February 1950
- Origin: Narbonne, France
- Died: 21 November 2024 (aged 74) 19th arrondissement of Paris, France
- Genres: Pop, chanson
- Occupation: Singer

Jean-Luc Jacques Potaux, born Richard-Jacques Bonay (French: [ʒoɛl pʁevo]; 16 February 1950 – 21 November 2024), known as Joël Prévost, was a French singer, best known for his participation in the Eurovision Song Contest 1978.

Born in the Languedoc-Roussillon region of southern France, Prévost was adopted soon after birth by a family from northern France who changed his name, and grew up at Trith-Saint-Léger, close to the border with Belgium. In 1963, at the age of 13, he won a singing competition organised by the regional newspaper La Voix du Nord. He moved to Paris in 1970 and starred in the musical "Hair" together with Gérard Lenorman. In 1972, he signed a contract with CBS Records, releasing a string of singles and touring over the next few years with artists such as Serge Gainsbourg, Mike Brant, Michèle Torr and Serge Lama.

In 1977, Prévost entered the French Eurovision selection with the song "Pour oublier Barbara", but failed to progress from the semi-final. The following year, his song "Il y aura toujours des violons" ("There Will Always Be Violins") was chosen as the French representative for the 23rd Eurovision Song Contest. Strangely, the song only finished second in the French semi-final before emerging the clear winner in the final. As a result of Marie Myriam's victory for France the previous year, the 1978 Eurovision was held in Paris, on 22 April. "Il y aura toujours des violons" finished the evening in third place out of 20 entries, despite being a very traditional, old-style ballad with no concession to the musical trends of the late 1970s.

Prévost remained active until 2017, when he retired, having played residencies at the Paris Olympia, Alhambra and toured extensively for several years throughout Africa.

Joël Prévost died on 21 November 2024, aged 74, in the 19th Arrondissement of Paris, France.

Preceded by Marie Myriam with L'oiseau et l'enfant	France in the Eurovision Song Contest; 1978	Succeeded by Anne-Marie David with Je suis l'enfant soleil
