= Sweden in the Eurovision Song Contest 1978 =

- Eurovision Song Contest 1978
- Participating broadcaster: Sveriges Radio (SR)
- Country: Sweden
- Selection process: Melodifestivalen 1978
- Selection date: 11 February 1978

Competing entry
- Song: "Det blir alltid värre framåt natten"
- Artist: Björn Skifs
- Songwriter: Peter Himmelstrand

Placement
- Final result: 14th, 26 points

Participation chronology

Sweden was represented at the Eurovision Song Contest 1978 with the song "Det blir alltid värre framåt natten", written by Peter Himmelstrand, and performed by Björn Skifs. The Swedish participating broadcaster, Sveriges Radio (SR), selected its entry through Melodifestivalen 1978.

== Before Eurovision ==
=== Melodifestivalen 1978 ===
Melodifestivalen 1978 was the selection for the 18th song to represent Sweden at the Eurovision Song Contest. It was the 17th time that Sveriges Radio (SR) used this system of picking a song. 58 songs were submitted to SR for the competition. The final was held in the Cirkus in Stockholm on 11 February 1978, presented by Ulf Elfving and broadcast on TV1 but was not broadcast on radio. The songs were not performed live, instead the performances were recorded the afternoon before, and inter-mingled with live pieces from the venue. There was a tie in the voting, and each regional jury was asked to award one point to their favourite song of "Det blir alltid värre framåt natten" and "Miss Decibel". The former won by eight votes to three.

R/O	Artist	Song	Songwriters	Points	Place
1	Pastellerna	"Idag är det vår"	Stig Jonsson; Peter Wanngren	52	6
2	Thomas Munck	"Nåt som gör dej glad"	Thomas Munck; Karin Stigmark; Anders Henriksson	11	10
3	Tomas Ledin	"Mademoiselle"	Tomas Ledin	78	5
4	Harlequin	"Harlequin"	Johan Langer; Jan Askelind	49	8
5	Göran Fristorp	"Längtan om livet med dig"	Göran Fristorp	85	3
6	Kikki Danielsson, Lasse Holm and Wizex	"Miss Decibel"	Lasse Holm; Gert Lengstrand	100	2
7	Kenneth Greuz	"Åh, evergreens"	Kenneth Greuz; Karin Stigmark	50	7
8	Pugh Rogefeldt	"Nattmara"	Pugh Rogefeldt	85	3
9	Jörgen Edman and Polarna	"Lilla stjärna"	Monica Carlsson; Pär Björk	29	9
10	Björn Skifs	"Det blir alltid värre framåt natten"	Peter Himmelstrand	100	1

==== Voting ====
R/O	Song	Luleå	Falun	Karlstad	Gothenburg	Umeå	Örebro	Norrköping	Malmö	Sundsvall	Växjö	Stockholm	Total
1	"Idag är det vår"	5	4	7	3	6	4	4	5	2	6	6	52
2	"Nåt som gör dej glad"	1	1	1	1	1	1	1	1	1	1	1	11
3	"Mademoiselle"	7	8	10	10	8	5	6	8	10	4	2	78
4	"Harlequin"	6	2	6	5	4	3	5	6	3	5	4	49
5	"Längtan om livet med dig"	4	7	12	7	5	7	8	10	12	8	5	85
6	"Miss Decibel"	10	10	4	8	10	12	12	12	5	7	10	100
7	"Åh, evergreens"	3	5	3	4	7	6	2	4	6	3	7	50
8	"Nattmara"	12	6	5	6	2	10	10	3	7	12	12	85
9	"Lilla stjärna"	2	3	2	2	3	2	3	2	4	2	3	28
10	"Det blir alltid värre framåt natten"	8	12	8	12	12	8	7	7	8	10	8	100

Tie-break
Song	Luleå	Falun	Karlstad	Gothenburg	Umeå	Örebro	Norrköping	Malmö	Sundsvall	Växjö	Stockholm	Total
"Miss Decibel"						1		1			1	3
"Det blir alltid värre framåt natten"	1	1	1	1	1		1		1	1		8

== At Eurovision ==
When Skifs was set to participate in the 1978 Eurovision Song Contest, he could not decide whether to sing in Swedish or English—possibly as a joke. This was a risky move, as the rules at the time required each country to perform its entry in its own language. The result was that Skifs became nervous and sang the wrong lyrics during the first verse—a moment that has since become a classic among Swedish TV blunders. The line "Dagarna och kvällarna, då lever jag – trivs med mitt jobb, har kompisar, att snacka med, det flyter" ("The days and the evenings, that’s when I live – I enjoy my job, have friends to talk to, things are going smoothly") instead turned into something along the lines of "Dagarna och kvällarna, då lever jag – röppni fälls, örr ur i knön, och gniblisåå, på kvällen." He finished 14th (out of 20).

=== Voting ===
Points awarded to Sweden
Score	Country
12 points	
10 points	Norway
8 points	
7 points	
6 points	
5 points	Ireland
4 points	Finland; United Kingdom
3 points	France
2 points	
1 point	

Points awarded by Sweden
Score	Country
12 points	Monaco
10 points	France
8 points	Ireland
7 points	Germany
6 points	Luxembourg
5 points	Austria
4 points	Belgium
3 points	United Kingdom
2 points	Greece
1 point	Netherlands
