= Luxembourg in the Eurovision Song Contest 1978 =

- Eurovision Song Contest 1978
- Participating broadcaster: Compagnie Luxembourgeoise de Télédiffusion (CLT)
- Country: Luxembourg
- Selection process: National final
- Selection date: 21 March 1978

Competing entry
- Song: "Parlez-vous français ?"
- Artist: Baccara
- Songwriters: Rolf Soja; Frank Dostal; Peter Zentner

Placement
- Final result: 7th, 73 points

Participation chronology

Luxembourg was represented at the Eurovision Song Contest 1978 with the song "Parlez-vous français ?", composed by Rolf Soja, with lyrics by Frank Dostal and Peter Zentner, and performed by Spanish duo Baccara. The Luxembourgish participating broadcaster, the Compagnie Luxembourgeoise de Télédiffusion (CLT), organised a public national final – rather than their usual method of internal selection – to select its entry for the contest.

Baccara were one of the most internationally famous acts ever to appear at Eurovision, being already known throughout Europe from two recent hugely successful singles, "Yes Sir, I Can Boogie" (which had spent a week at the top of the UK Singles Chart in late 1977) and "Sorry, I'm a Lady". Frank Dostal, who wrote the lyrics for "Parlez-vous français ?", had also penned the duo's previous recordings.

== Before Eurovision ==
=== Concours Eurovision de la Chanson 1978 ===
The Luxembourgish national final, Concours Eurovision de la Chanson 1978, was broadcast live on RTL at 20:00 CET on 21 March 1978. No information on the venue, host(s), or voting system is known. Five acts took part, including Gitte Hænning who had represented Germany in 1973 and Liliane Saint-Pierre who would represent Belgium in 1987.

Final - 21 March 1978
R/O	Artist	Song	Songwriter(s)	Points	Place
1	Jean-Paul Cara	"Un arbre dans la ville"	Joe Gracy; Jean-Paul Cara	62	2
2	Gitte Hænning	"Rien qu'une femme"	Hans-Georg Moslener; R. Frank	56	3
3	Jairo	"Dans les yeux d'un enfant"	Jairo; Michel Jourdan	51	5
4	Baccara	"Parlez-vous français ?"	Rolf Soja; Frank Dostal; Peter Zentner	80	1
5	Liliane Saint-Pierre	"Mélodie"	Claude Barzotti; Michel Detry	52	4

== At Eurovision ==
The contest was broadcast on RTL Télé-Luxembourg with Jacques Navadic and André Torrent as commentators.

On the night of the final Baccara performed 17th in the running order, following Denmark and preceding eventual contest winners Israel. At the close of the voting they had received 73 points, placing Luxembourg 7th of the 20 entries. The Luxembourgish jury awarded its 12 points to Israel.

=== Voting ===
Points awarded to Luxembourg
Score	Country
12 points	Italy; Portugal; Spain
10 points	
8 points	
7 points	Denmark; United Kingdom
6 points	Monaco; Sweden
5 points	
4 points	
3 points	Belgium; Netherlands
2 points	Ireland; Turkey
1 point	Greece

Points awarded by Luxembourg
Score	Country
12 points	Israel
10 points	Ireland
8 points	Switzerland
7 points	Belgium
6 points	Netherlands
5 points	United Kingdom
4 points	Greece
3 points	Italy
2 points	Spain
1 point	France
