= Turkey in the Eurovision Song Contest 1978 =

- Eurovision Song Contest 1978
- Participating broadcaster: Turkish Radio and Television Corporation (TRT)
- Country: Turkey
- Selection process: Şarkı Yarışması
- Selection date: 5 February 1978

Competing entry
- Song: "Sevince"
- Artist: Nilüfer and Nazar
- Songwriters: Dağhan Baydur; Onno Tunç; Hulki Aktunç

Placement
- Final result: 18th, 2 points

Participation chronology

Turkey was represented at the Eurovision Song Contest 1978 with the song "Sevince", composed by Dağhan Baydur and Onno Tunç, with lyrics by Hulki Aktunç, and performed by Nilüfer and Nazar. The Turkish participating broadcaster, Turkish Radio and Television Corporation (TRT), selected its entry through a national final called Şarkı Yarışması. This was the second entry from Turkey in the Eurovision Song Contest. The entry came 18th in the contest.

== Before Eurovision ==
=== Şarkı Yarışması ===
The Turkish entry for the Eurovision Song Contest 1978 was chosen during a national final called Şarkı Yarışması. The national final featured a semi-final on 18 December 1977 and a final on 5 February 1978. 232 songs were submitted to Turkish Radio and Television Corporation (TRT) and 12 were selected by a selection committee for the national final.

==== Semi-final ====
The semi-final took place on 18 December 1977 at the Orkut TV Studios in Ankara. The top five entries determined by an expert jury proceeded to the final.

Semi-final – 18 December 1977
R/O	Artist	Song	Lyricist	Composer	Result
1	Serpil Barlas & 2. Baskı	"Yaşamana Bak"	Zeren Uluer	Levent Altındağ; Behiç Altındağ	Qualified
2	Cengiz Orçun	"Barış"	Cengiz Orçun		—N/a
3	Grup Sekstet	"İnsanız Biz"	Şanar Yurdatapan	Atilla Özdemiroğlu	Qualified
4	Aydın Tansel	"Hiç Şansım Yok"	Aydın Tansel		—N/a
5	Anadolu Majör	"Dostluğa Davet"	Ali Kocatepe		Qualified
6	Grup Karma	"İmkansız"	Dilek Ertek	Galip Boransu	Qualified
7	Rezzan Yücel	"Bu Gece"	Çiğdem Talu	Melih Kibar	—N/a
8	Ayça Oktay & Elma Şekerleri	"Küçük Kız"	Oktay Yurdatapan	Baha Boduroğlu	—N/a
9	Nilüfer & Nazar	"Sevince"	Hulki Aktunç	Dağhan Baydur; Onno Tunç	Qualified
10	Nükhet Duru	"Anılar"	Mehmet Teoman	Cenk Taşkan	—N/a
11	Ali Rıza Binboğa	"Baharım Sensin"	Ali Rıza Binboğa		—N/a
12	Cahit Oben	"Dosta Mektup"	Cahit Oben		—N/a

==== Final ====
The final took place on 9 February 1978 at 20:40 TRT (5:40 UTC) in the Orkut TV Studios in Ankara, hosted by Bülend Özveren. The five entries that qualified from the preceding semi-final competed, and the winner was determined by an expert jury.

Final – 5 February 1978
R/O	Artist	Song	Points	Place
1	Anadolu Majör	"Dostluğa Davet"	16	3
2	Nilüfer & Nazar	"Sevince"	20	1
3	Grup Karma	"İmkansız"	12	4
4	Grup Sekstet	"İnsanız Biz"	19	2
5	Serpil Barlas & 2. Baskı	"Yaşamana Bak"	7	5

== At Eurovision ==
The contest was broadcast on TRT Televizyon.

=== Voting ===
Points awarded to Turkey
Score	Country
12 points	
10 points	
8 points	
7 points	
6 points	
5 points	
4 points	
3 points	
2 points	
1 point	Norway; United Kingdom

Points awarded by Turkey
Score	Country
12 points	Israel
10 points	Ireland
8 points	Germany
7 points	Spain
6 points	United Kingdom
5 points	Monaco
4 points	France
3 points	Austria
2 points	Luxembourg
1 point	Italy
