= Sunrise (German band) =

German pop group

- Origin: Germany
- Genre: Pop
- Years active: 1970s

Sunrise is a German pop group from the late 1970s. In 1978, the song "Call on Me" was covered in German by Jürgen Drews and in 1996 for the US by Amber under the title "Colour of Love".

The band's greatest hits include "Call on Me" (1977) and "Good, Good, Good" (1979). Their album Call on Me was produced by the German musicians Holger Julian Copp and Hanno Harders (also known as Beagle Music Ltd.) and Michael Reinecke.
