= Tania Tsanaklidou =

Greek artist

Soultana (Tania) Tsanaklidou (Greek: Τάνια Τσανακλίδου, born 9 April 1952) is a Greek artist, both singer and actress, who represented Greece in the Eurovision Song Contest 1978.

== Biography ==
Tania was born in Drama, Greece on 9 April 1952 and was raised in Thessaloniki. By the age of eight, she had already taken part in a children's theatrical play. She studied drama and ancient history and took courses in dancing. When she was 21 she moved to Athens where she started to work as a theatre actress and in 1978 she got her first part in a TV series.

In 1978, she represented Greece in the Eurovision Song Contest with a song titled "Charlie Chaplin", and came eighth. Right after this she performed at the award ceremony of the Cannes Film Festival. In 1980, she was awarded the prize of the French Festival Rose d'Or.

She began recording albums while concurrently performing in music appearances all over Greece.

== Discography ==
- 1978-Charlie Chaplin
- 1978-Ares Mares Koukounares
- 1980-Horis Taftotita
- 1982-File
- 1985-Tis Vrohis kai tis Nihtas
- 1986-Clise
- 1988-Ta tragoudia tou Bar
- 1988-Mama Gernao
- 1990-Alliotiki Mera
- 1991-Nadir
- 1995-Oi Megaliteres Epitihies tis Tanias Tsanaklidou
- 1995-Tragoudia tou Paraxenou Kosmou
- 1997-Live
- 1998-To Magiko Kouti
- 2000-Mia Agapi Mikri
- 2001-To Hroma tis Imeras
- 2009-Proswpografia

Preceded by Paschalis, Marianna, Robert Williams & Bessy with Mathima solfege	Greece in the Eurovision Song Contest; 1978	Succeeded by Elpida with Sokrati
