= Jonny Hill (singer) =

Austrian singer (born 1940)

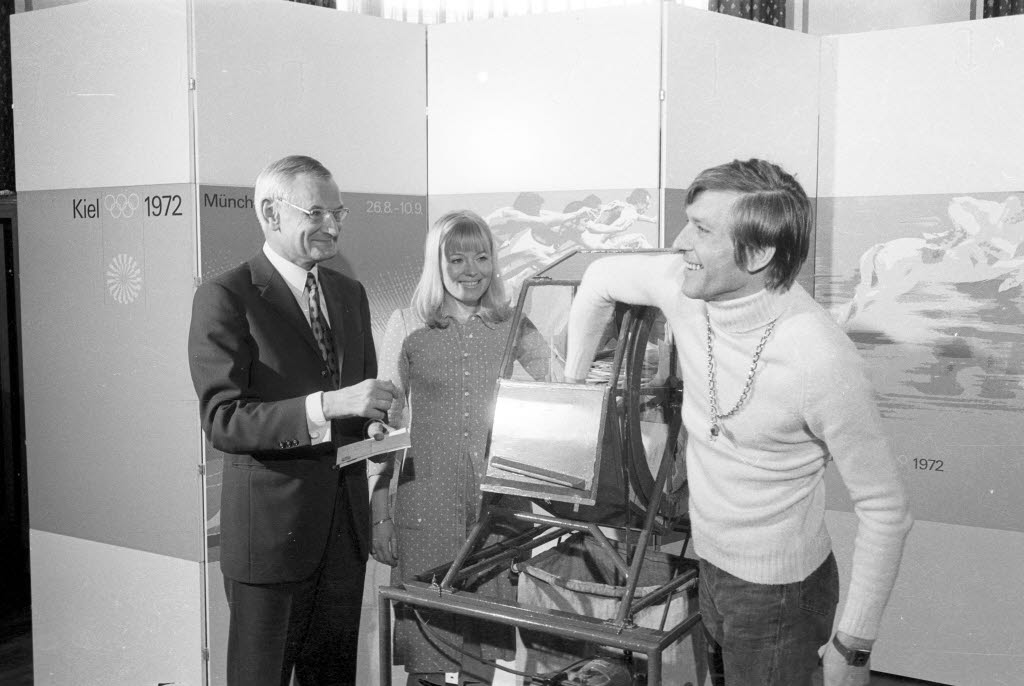
Jonny Hill (right)

Jonny Hill (born 1940) is an Austrian singer. He is best known for the songs “Ruf Teddybär eins vier”, “Der alte Mann” and “30 Tonnen Kerosin”.

== Biography ==
After graduating from school, Jonny Hill worked as an actor. He played several roles in the theater and appeared in a supporting role in the 1962 feature film “Auf Wiedersehn am blauen Meer”. Hill was discovered as a singer by Lotar Olias, who wanted to develop him because of his Freddy Quinn-like voice. Under the pseudonym Victor, he recorded the singles Liebe ist Feuer und Wasser and Ich bin dein Freund in 1968. Jonny Hill's breakthrough in northern Germany came in October 1969 with the hit Wieder in der Heimat.

== Discography ==
Albums:

- Eine Reise um die Welt 1969
- Unsere Heimat ist der Ozean 1971
- Weit, weit, weit ist es nach Lüdenscheid 1975
- Auf großer Fahrt 1976 (mit Käpt'n Ross und dem Hummel-Hummel-Orchester)
- Weihnachten mit Dir 1976
- Soweit die Füße tragen 1979
- Die bekanntesten 24 Country Hits in deutsch 1979
- Ein Mann und das Meer 1980
- Die schönsten deutschen Volkslieder im Country-Sound 1981
- Ich fahr' meine Tour
- Country Songs 1983
- Westwärts 1987
- Hallo Teddybär 1987
- Zorn und Zärtlichkeit 1988
- Ohne Grenzen 1990
- Live In Concert
- Ich bin für die Liebe 1991
- König der Landstraße 1991
- Dieser Weg führt nach Haus 1992
- Truck Gold 1996
- Meine Liebe lebt 1993
- Country Songs 1994
- Meilensteine 1994
- Süßer die Glocken nie klingen (after "Süßer die Glocken nie klingen") 1995
- Mitten im Leben 1996
- Nie wieder allein 1996
- Lass mich sein wie ich bin 1997
- Cowboy der Landstraße 1998
- Wölfe und Schafe 1999
- Auf großer Fahrt 2000
- Bis ans Ende der Welt 2002
- Herzlichst 2003
- Ich hab noch viele Träume 2003
- Gala der Gefühle 2004 (Duett-CD mit Linda Feller)
- Lichter auf den Hügeln 2006
- Unvergessene Hits 2009
- Jonny Hill singt .. die schönsten Lieder von Freddy Quinn 2011
- In Nashville 2012.
- Das Beste - 30 Jahre 2011
- Bitte treten Sie zurück 2014
