= Mabel (band) =

Danish pop music group

- Origin: Stenløse, Denmark
- Genres: Rock; Pop; Glam rock
- Years active: 1967–1982
- Past members: Mike Tramp; Peter Nielson; Andy Larrson; Chris Have; Gert Von Magnus; Otto Kulmbak

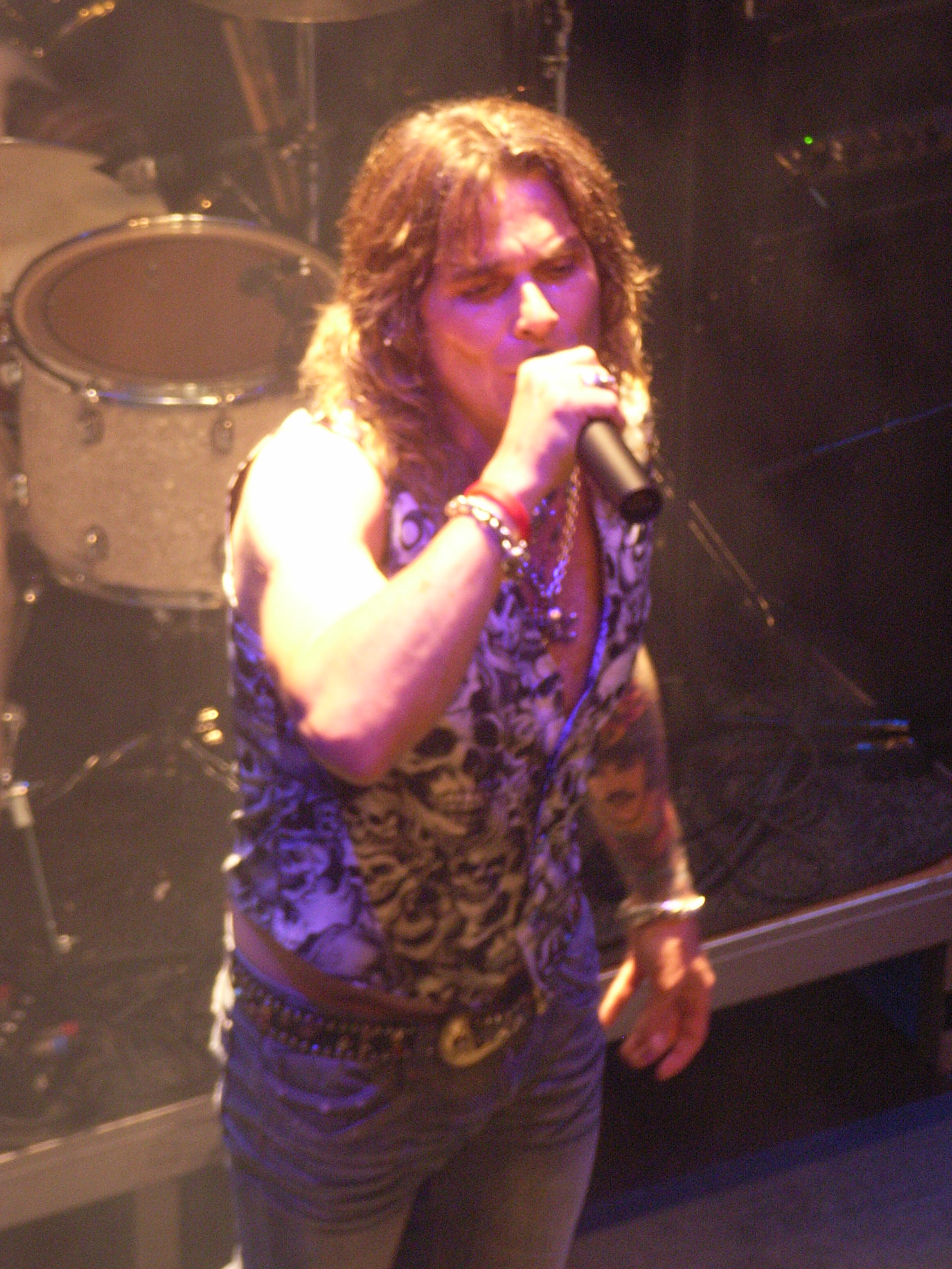
Mike Tramp performing in Heerlen

Mabel was a Danish pop music group from Stenløse, Denmark. They came to prominence after winning the Dansk Melodi Grand Prix song contest with the song "Boom Boom" in 1978, and represented Denmark at the Eurovision Song Contest the same year. The band were successful in Denmark and Spain. Mabel later became the metal band Studs, and disbanded in late 1982. Lead singer Mike Tramp went on to form White Lion in 1983.

== History ==
Mabel were originally a band called The Cops formed by Chris Have, Otto Kulmbak (Andy Larsson), and Peter Nielsen while they were still in school in Stenløse. The band became the Mabel in 1972 and they released two singles with lead singer Gert Von Magnus. Mike Tramp (originally name Michael Trempenau) from Vesterbro, Copenhagen was in a local youth club band called Vesterbro Ungdomsgård, and he also recorded a single at the age of 15 in 1976. Later that year he joined Mabel as their lead singer after Gert Von Magnus was persuaded to sign up under the management of Tam Paton in Scotland. They released an album Another Fine Mess.

In 1978, Mabel entered the Dansk Melodi Grand Prix song contest with the song "Boom Boom". The song was a Danish version of the title song for their second album they were working on, Message From My Heart. With this win, they then represented Denmark in the Eurovision Song Contest 1978 that same year and finished 16th. They released the albums Message From My Heart and Mabel 4-Ever in 1978. The following year, they entered Dansk Melodi Grand Prix again and finished fifth. They were successful in Denmark as the country's first boy band, selling more than 1.5 million records. They moved to Spain in 1980 where they also had some success, and they released their album Extranos there. Later, Mabel became a metal band Studs in 1981, releasing their self-titled album in Spain. They moved to New York City and became Danish Lions in 1982 and recorded some demos.

Failing to find success in the States, they returned home to Denmark at the end of 1982 for Christmas, and decided to break up the band. Mike Tramp returned to the United States, and became the lead singer for White Lion and then Freak of Nature. The band briefly reformed to perform a show in 2008 on the 30th anniversary of the 1978 hit "Boom Boom", and on TV in 2009. They also released a compilation album Det Sidste Boom.

== Discography ==
=== Albums ===
- Another Fine Mess (1977)
- Message From My Heart (1978), also released as Boom Boom (1978)
- Mabel 4-Ever (1978)
- Skateboard Rider (France only) (1978)
- We Are the 80's (1979)
- Extranos (Spain only) (1981)

=== Compilations ===
- Mabel's Største Successer (1979)
- Det Sidste Boom (2009)

=== EPs ===
- 4Hits

=== Singles ===
- "The Look in Her Eyes" (1975)
- "Twist Little Sister" (1976)
- "Hey, I Love You" (1976)
- "Close Your Eyes" (1977)
- "Skateboard Rider" (1978)
- "I Am a Hot Dog" (1979)
- "Born to Make You Happy" (1979)
- "Extranos" (1981)

== Band members ==
- Michael Trempenau – Vocals and guitar
- Peter Nielsen – Lead guitar and backing vocals
- Andy Larsson – Bass and backing vocals
- Chris Have – Drums

Former members

- Gert Von Magnus – Vocals (1975–76)
