= Jørgen de Mylius =

Danish radio and TV personality (born 1946)

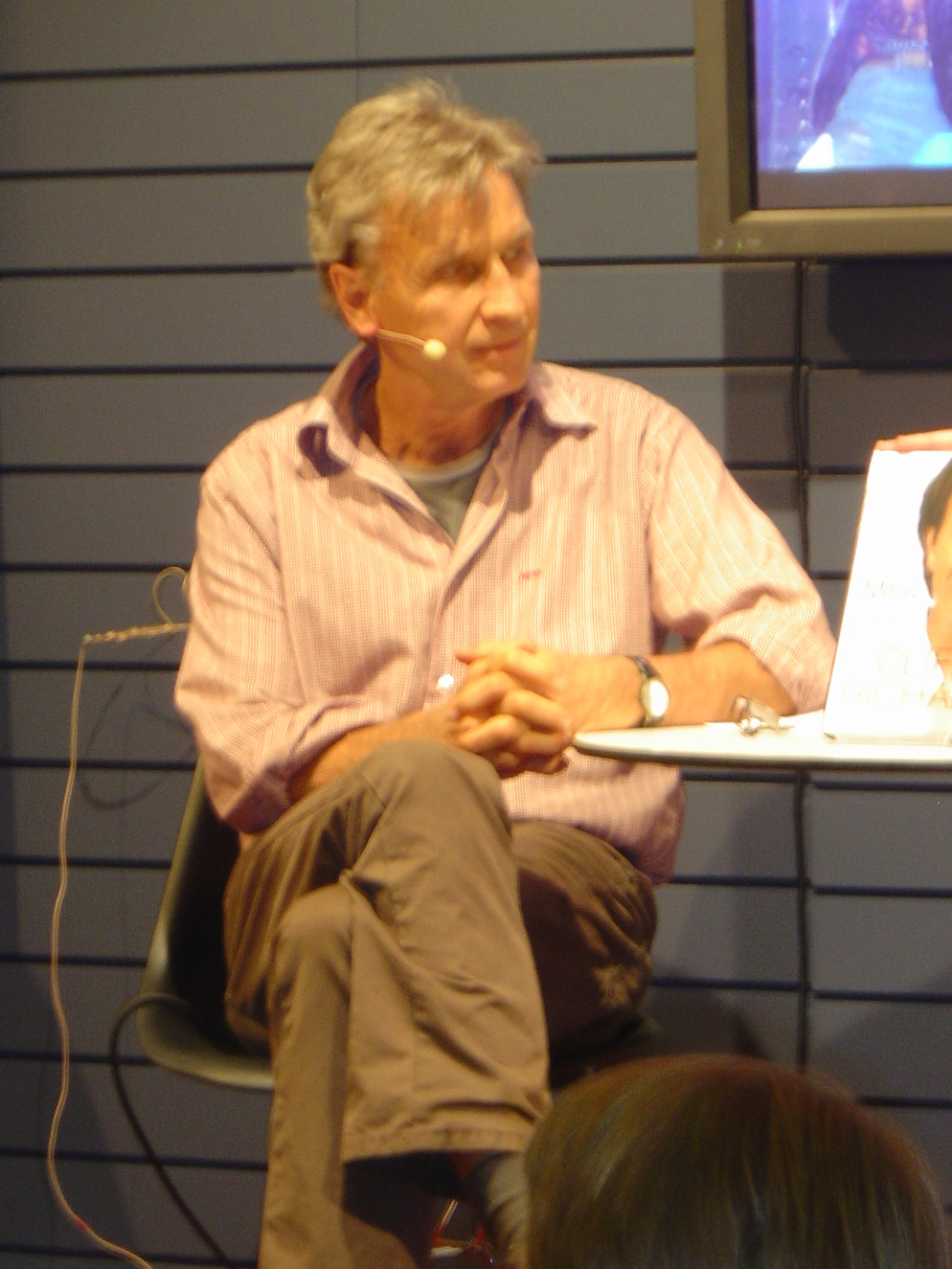
- During the Danish book fair, BogForum 2008, at Forum Copenhagen
- Born: 5 March 1946 (age 80); Frederiksberg, Denmark
- Occupation: Danish TV radio host

Jørgen de Mylius (born 5 March 1946) is a Danish music journalist on radio and television. He is best known as a host and commentator for the Dansk Melodi Grand Prix, the annual song contest selecting the Danish entry in the Eurovision Song Contest. In the 1980s, he hosted the TV program El Dorado which later re-emerged as a radio show.

Dubbed "Denmark's oldest teenager", he is sometimes referred to as Jørgen Mylius or by his nickname Mylle.

== Early life and education ==
De Mylius was born on 5 March 1946, at Frederiksberg, Denmark and graduated a mathematical Student from Østre Borgerdyd Gymnasium in 1964. He completed his journalism degree in 1968.

Later in his career, he studied film and TV at the University of California, Los Angeles.

== Career ==
In 1963, De Mylius started working for DR (Danmarks Radio). He was first hired as a teenager, after contacting DR to complain about the lack of programming for young people who wanted to listen to pop music and rock. Radio shows such as Top 20, Efter Skoletid, For de unge were created within the first 18 months.

He also worked as a radio reporter from the U.S., Japan, France and Luxembourg up until 1977. In April of the same year, he began working in the television department of DR. His debut as host was in 1978 where he hosted the Dansk Melodi Grand Prix. All in all he has hosted 11 Dansk Melodi Grand Prix competitions and commented 19 Eurovision Song Contest competitions.

At the Eurovision Song Contest 1980, he introduced the Danish entry in The Hague. He has also hosted and produced a series of shows such as Eldorado, Stardust, Musikboxen and Pop-quiz among others. In 1989 he began hosting the radio show Mylles Hylde on DR P3 and during 1990-91 he studied film at UCLA in Los Angeles. During the late 1990s he hosted the popular radio show De ringer, vi spiller.

Besides his appearance on the work as a host on TV and the radio he has also written biographies of musicians Cliff Richard, Elvis Presley, and Jodle Birge.

As of 1999 he works as executive editor for the TV show Hit med Sangen and currently also hosts the radio show Hithouse on Saturdays between 16:05 - 18:50 on DR P4.
