= Charlie Chaplin (song) =

1978 song by Tania Tsanaklidou

Single by Tania Tsanaklidou

from the album Charlie Chaplin
- Language: Greek
- Released: April 1978
- Genre: Pop
- Length: 2:51
- Composer: Sakis Tsilikis
- Lyricist: Yiannis Xantoulis
- Producer: Haris Andreadis

Tania Tsanaklidou singles chronology
"Ερωτόκριτος" (1976)	"Charlie Chaplin" (1978)	"Άρες μάρες κουκουνάρες" (1978)

Eurovision Song Contest 1978 entry
- Country: Greece
- Artist: Tania Tsanaklidou
- Language: Greek
- Composer: Sakis Tsilikis
- Lyricist: Yiannis Xantoulis
- Conductor: Haris Andreadis

Finals performance
- Final result: 8th
- Final points: 66

Entry chronology
- ◄ "Mathima solfege" (1977)
- "Sokrati" (1979) ►

"Charlie Chaplin" (Greek script: Τσάρλυ Τσάπλιν) is a song recorded by Greek singer Tania Tsanaklidou with music composed by Sakis Tsilikis and Greek lyrics written by Yiannis Xantoulis. It represented Greece in the Eurovision Song Contest 1978, held in Paris.

== Conception ==
"Τσάρλυ Τσάπλιν" was composed by Sakis Tsilikis with Greek lyrics by Yiannis Xantoulis. It is in praise of Charlie Chaplin who had died the year before, with the singer describing his comic appearance and wishing that there were more of him. In addition to the Greek language original version, Tania Tsanaklidou recorded the English language version titled "Charlie Chaplin".

== Eurovision ==
The Hellenic Broadcasting Corporation (ERT) internally selected "Charlie Chaplin" performed by Tsanaklidou as it entrant for the 23rd edition of the Eurovision Song Contest.

On 22 April 1978, the Eurovision Song Contest was held at the Palais des Congrès in Paris hosted by Télévision Française 1 (TF1) and broadcast live throughout the continent. Tsanaklidou performed "Charlie Chaplin" in Greek fifteenth on the evening dressed like the Tramp, following Monaco's "Les jardins de Monaco" by Caline & Olivier Toussaint and preceding Denmark's "Boom Boom" by Mabel. Haris Andreadis conducted the event's live orchestra in the performance of the Luxembourgish entry.

At the close of voting, it had received 66 points, placing eighth in a field of twenty. It was succeeded as Greek entrant at the 1979 contest by "Sokrati" by Elpida.
