= List of number-one singles in the Dutch Top 40 =

This is a list of number-one hits in the Dutch Top 40 (in the Netherlands).

== Lists of number ones by year ==
1960 1961 1962 1963 1964 1965 1966 1967 1968 1969

1970 1971 1972 1973 1974 1975 1976 1977 1978 1979

1980 1981 1982 1983 1984 1985 1986 1987 1988 1989

1990 1991 1992 1993 1994 1995 1996 1997 1998 1999

2000 2001 2002 2003 2004 2005 2006 2007 2008 2009

2010 2011 2012 2013 2014 2015 2016 2017 2018 2019

2020 2021 2022 2023 2024 2025 2026

== See also ==
- List of artists who reached number one on the Dutch Top 40
