= Willem Duyn =

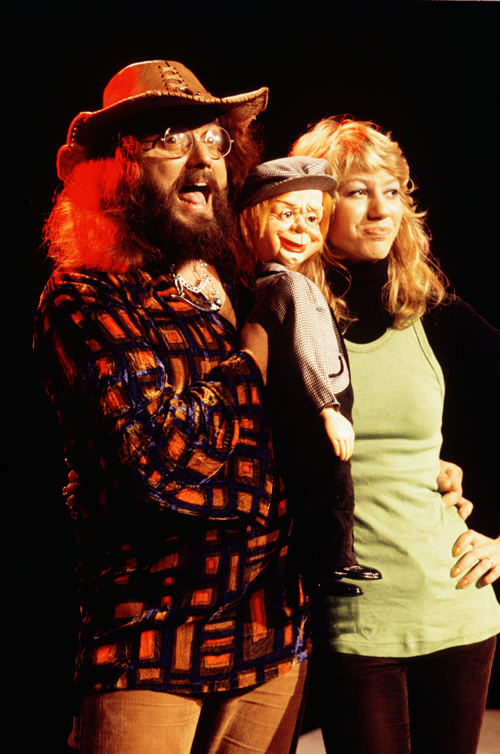
- Duyn (left) on stage with Maggie MacNeal, as Mouth and MacNeal in 1973.

Background information
- Born: Wilhelmus Jacobus Duyn; 31 March 1937; Haarlem, Netherlands
- Died: 4 December 2004 (aged 67) Roswinkel, Drenthe, Netherlands
- Genres: Pop, folk
- Occupations: Singer, actor, entertainer
- Years active: 1963–2004

Wilhelmus Jacobus Duyn (31 March 1937 – 4 December 2004) was a Dutch singer, actor, entertainer and voice over artist. Under the stage name Big Mouth he was co-vocalist of the Dutch pop music duos Mouth & MacNeal (1971–1974) and Big Mouth & Little Eve (1975–1977).

== Career ==
=== Early career ===
During the 1960s Duyn was a popular musician; he had performed in many Dutch bands such as Whiskers, and the Jay-Jays. He was also active as a club DJ at various Dutch nightclubs. In the 1960s, he played in a group called Speedway.

=== Mouth & MacNeal ===
In 1970 music producer Hans van Hemert invited Duyn to join his new music group Mouth & MacNeal, together with Maggie MacNeal. The duo released their first single, "Hey You Love", which reached #5 in the Dutch Top 40, while the next two singles "How Do You Do" and "Hello-A" both reached #1 in the Netherlands. In 1972, "How Do You Do" reached the top of the charts throughout Continental Europe and Scandinavia and peaked at number 32 in Australia, made popular by local bands Jigsaw and Windows.

Following several successful hits the duo represented the Netherlands at the Eurovision Song Contest in Brighton, with I See a Star that finished third on the night. The duo ended in 1974.

=== Later career ===
After 1974, Duyn began writing, performing, and releasing new material as a solo artist. From 1975 to 1977, he was a part of the duo Big Mouth & Little Eve, along with Ingrid Kup. Big Mouth & Little Eve released one album and eight singles during their short tenure.

Duyn was also active as an actor, starring in the Dutch television programme Pompy de Robodoll and also lent his voice in voice acting. He provided the voice of King Louie in the Dutch version of The Jungle Book, Scat Cat in the Dutch version of The Aristocats and Louie and DeSoto in the Dutch version of Oliver & Company.

== Death ==
Duyn died on 4 December 2004 after suffering a cardiac arrest, at his home in Roswinkel, Drenthe, Netherlands. He was survived by his second wife and six children.

== Discography ==
=== Mouth & MacNeal ===
==== Albums ====
Title	Year
Mouth & MacNeal	1971
Hello and Thank You	1972
Mouth & MacNeal II	1972
Ik zee een ster (I See A Star)	1974

==== Singles ====
Single	Year
"Hey, You Love"	1971
"How Do You Do"	1971
"Hello-A"	1972
"You-Kou-La-Le-Lou-Pi"	1972
"Bat-Te-Ring-Ram"	1973
"Medizinmann" (Germany-only release)	1973
"Minnie, Minnie"	1973
"Do You Wanna Do It"	1973
"Wie denn wo denn was denn" (Germany-only release)	1973
"I See a Star"	1974
"Ik zie een ster (I see a star)"	1974
"Ah! l'amore"	1974
"Ein gold'ner Stern (I see a star)" (Germany-only release)	1974
"We're Gonna Have a Party"	1974
"L'amour au pas" (France and Belgium-only release)	1974

=== Big Mouth & Little Eve ===
==== Albums ====
Title	Year
Medley	1977

==== Singles ====
A-Side	B-Side	Year	Note
Uncle	Hi, Hey, Ho And Hello	1975	
Yo-De-Lay-Dee	Yo-De-Lay-Dee	1975	
Love Me, Baby	Love Me, Baby	1976	
Daddy, Won't You Play	Daddy, Won't You Play	1976	
Träume Gehen Schnell Vorbei	Träume Gehen Schnell Vorbei	1976	
Welcome Home	Welcome Home	1977	
Jingle Jangle Johnny	Jingle Jangle Johnny	1977	
