= Do It Any Way You Wanna =

Single by People's Choice

from the album Boogie Down U.S.A.
- B-side: "The Big Hurt"
- Released: January 1975
- Recorded: 1974
- Studio: Sigma Sound, Philadelphia, Pennsylvania
- Genre: Disco, Funk
- Length: 3:15
- Label: TSOP
- Songwriter: Leon Huff
- Producer: Leon Huff

People's Choice singles chronology
"Party is a Groovy Thing" (1974)	"Do It Any Way You Wanna" (1975)	"Nursery Rhymes (Part I)" (1975)

Do It Any Way You Wanna is a 1975 crossover hit by the Philadelphia based R&B/disco group People's Choice, written and produced by Leon Huff and recorded and mixed by Jay Mark. "Do It Any Way You Wanna" was certified Gold by the Recording Industry Association of America.

== Chart performance ==
The single made it to #1 on the Billboard soul singles chart for one week and crossed over to the Billboard Hot 100, peaking at #11. "Do It Any Way You Wanna" was also successful on the disco/dance chart, hitting #3.

== Cover versions and samples ==
The song formed the basis of the 1977 reggae hit "Cokane in My Brain" by Dillinger from his album CB 200. It was also covered by rapper Guru on the 1993 soundtrack album Addams Family Values: Music from the Motion Picture for the film of the same name.
