= List of Dutch Top 40 number-one singles of 1971 =

These hits topped the Dutch Top 40 in 1971.

Issue Date	Song	Artist(s)	Reference
2 January	"My Sweet Lord"	George Harrison	
9 January	"My Sweet Lord"	George Harrison	
16 January	"My Sweet Lord"	George Harrison	
23 January	"My Sweet Lord"	George Harrison	
30 January	"Nothing Rhymed"	Gilbert O'Sullivan	
6 February	"Nothing Rhymed"	Gilbert O'Sullivan	
13 February	"Nothing Rhymed"	Gilbert O'Sullivan	
20 February	"Nothing Rhymed"	Gilbert O'Sullivan	
27 February	"Nothing Rhymed"	Gilbert O'Sullivan	
6 March	"Du"	Peter Maffay	
13 March	"Du"	Peter Maffay	
20 March	"Du"	Peter Maffay	
27 March	"Du"	Peter Maffay	
3 April	"Du"	Peter Maffay	
10 April	"Mozart symphony no. 40 in G minor, KV 550, 1st movement"	Orchestre Manuel de Falla, conducted by Waldo de los Ríos	
17 April	"Mozart symphony no. 40 in G minor, KV 550, 1st movement"	Orchestre Manuel de Falla, conducted by Waldo de los Ríos	
24 April	"Mozart symphony no. 40 in G minor, KV 550, 1st movement"	Orchestre Manuel de Falla, conducted by Waldo de los Ríos	
1 May	"Funny Funny"	The Sweet	
8 May	"Funny Funny"	The Sweet	
15 May	"Underneath the Blanket Go"	Gilbert O'Sullivan	
22 May	"Underneath the Blanket Go"	Gilbert O'Sullivan	
29 May	"Brown Sugar"	The Rolling Stones	
5 June	"Brown Sugar"	The Rolling Stones	
12 June	"Rosetta"	Georgie Fame & Alan Price	
19 June	"Double Barrel"	Dave & Ansil Collins	
26 June	"Double Barrel"	Dave & Ansil Collins	
3 July	"Double Barrel"	Dave & Ansil Collins	
10 July	"Zou het erg zijn, lieve opa"	Vader Abraham & Wilma	
17 July	"Zou het erg zijn, lieve opa"	Vader Abraham & Wilma	
24 July	"Manuela"	Jacques Herb & De Riwi's	
31 July	"Manuela"	Jacques Herb & De Riwi's	
7 August	"Manuela"	Jacques Herb & De Riwi's	
14 August	"Borriquito"	Peret	
21 August	"Borriquito"	Peret	
28 August	"Borriquito"	Peret	
4 September	"Borriquito"	Peret	
11 September	"Borriquito"	Peret	
18 September	"Borriquito"	Peret	
25 September	"Borriquito"	Peret	
2 October	"Soldiers Who Want to Be Heroes"	Rod McKuen	
9 October	"Soldiers Who Want to Be Heroes"	Rod McKuen	
16 October	"Soldiers Who Want to Be Heroes"	Rod McKuen	
23 October	"Soldiers Who Want to Be Heroes"	Rod McKuen	
30 October	"Soley Soley"	Middle of the Road	
6 November	"Soley Soley"	Middle of the Road	
13 November	"Soley Soley"	Middle of the Road	
20 November	"Soley Soley"	Middle of the Road	
27 November	"Without a Worry in the World"	Rod McKuen	
4 December	"Non, non, rien n'a changé"	Les Poppys	
11 December	"Non, non, rien n'a changé"	Les Poppys	
18 December	"How Do You Do"	Mouth & MacNeal	
25 December	"How Do You Do"	Mouth & MacNeal	

== See also ==
- 1971 in music
