= Maggie MacNeal =

Dutch singer (born 1950)

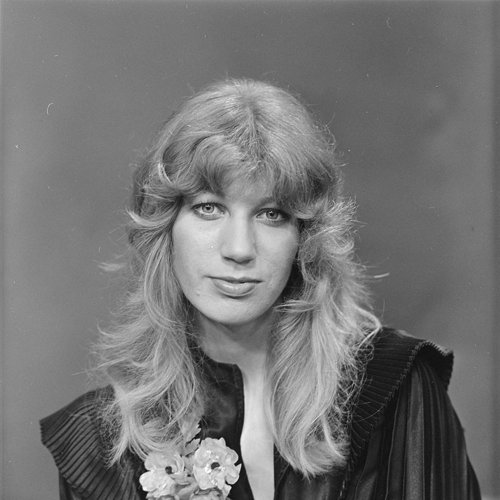
- MacNeal in 1976

Background information
- Born: Sjoukje Lucie van 't Spijker; 5 May 1950 (age 76); Tilburg, Netherlands
- Genres: Pop
- Occupation: Musician
- Instrument: Vocals
- Years active: 1971–present

Sjoukje Lucie Smit (née van 't Spijker; born 5 May 1950), known professionally as Maggie MacNeal, is a Dutch singer. She was a member of the pop duo Mouth and MacNeal, who are best known for their 1972 million-selling record "How Do You Do", and for representing the Netherlands at the Eurovision Song Contest 1974, finishing third with the song "I See a Star". In 1980, she represented the Netherlands at the Eurovision Song Contest 1980, finishing fifth with the song "Amsterdam".

== Career ==
=== Mouth & MacNeal ===
Born Sjoukje Lucie van 't Spijker, she would go under the name Maggie MacNeal. In 1971, she signed to Decca Records and released her debut solo single – a cover, produced by Hans van Hemert, of "I Heard It Through the Grapevine", written by Norman Whitfield and Barrett Strong and made famous by singer Marvin Gaye.

In 1972, she teamed up with Willem Duyn, also known as Big Mouth, to form the duo known as Mouth & MacNeal, recording Pop international hits such as "How Do You Do" (1971), "Hey, You Love" (#45Canada), and "Hello-A" (1972)(#95CAN). She was with Mouth & MacNeal from 1971 to 1974 including a participation in the Eurovision Song Contest 1974 with the song "I See a Star".

=== Solo career ===
After their breakup, she formed her own group in 1975 with her husband Frans Smit (drums), Adri de Hont (guitar), Ben Vermeulen and Will de Meijer (bass guitar). In 1977, the line-up changed to Smit, Jons Pistoor, Lex Bolderdijk, and Robert Verwey (bass). She participated again in the Eurovision Song Contest 1980 where she finished in 5th place with the song Amsterdam.

MacNeal was one of the artists who recorded the song Shalom from Holland as a token of solidarity to the Israeli people, threatened by missiles from Iraq, during the first Gulf War in 1991.

In 2000, she became a member of the Dutch Divas, together with Marga Bult.

MacNeal was still touring in 2023.

== Discography ==
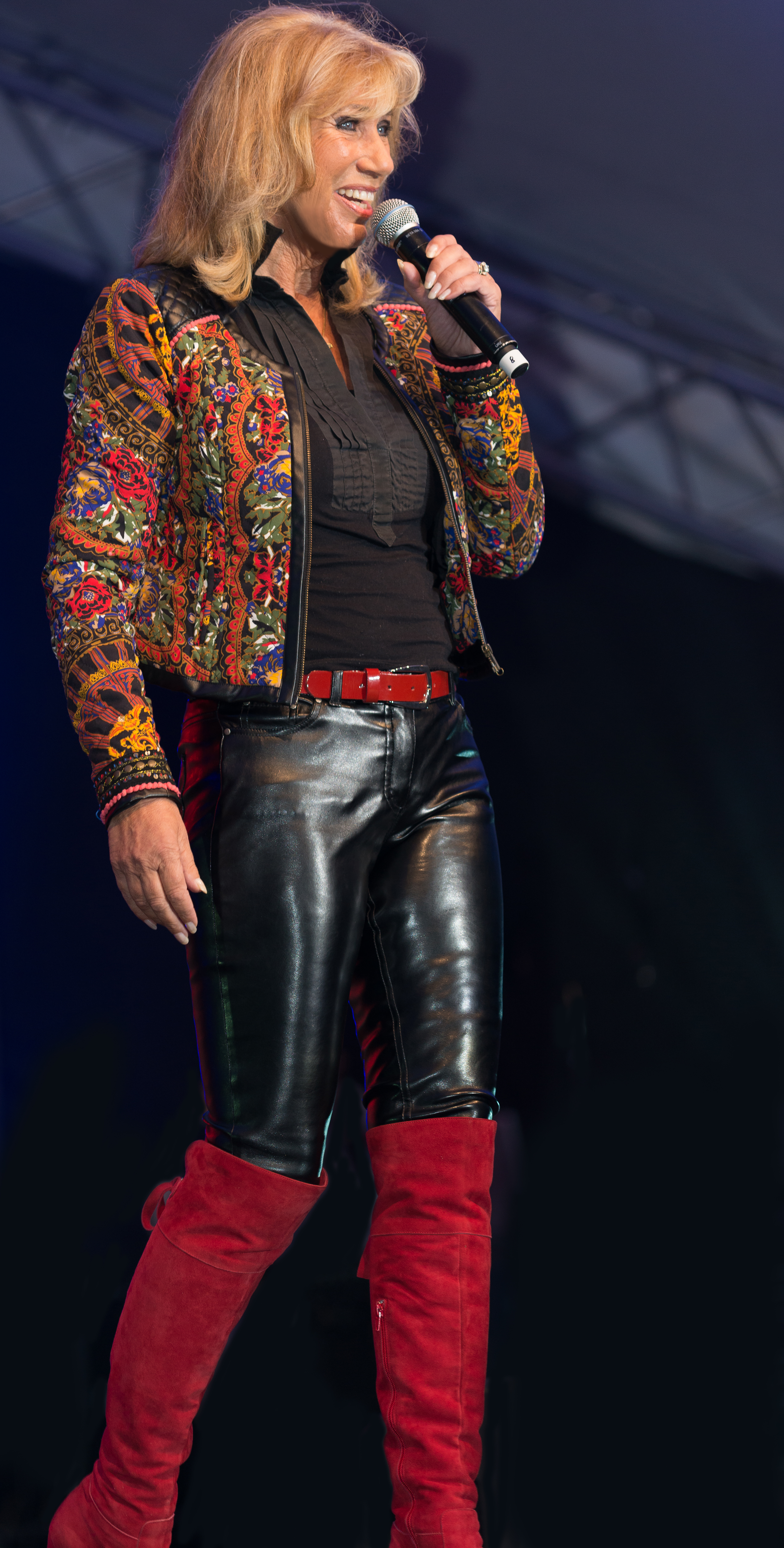
MacNeal at Stockholm Pride 2015

=== Solo ===
==== Singles ====
A-Side	B-Side	Year
I Heard It Through the Grapevine	Isolation	1971
Nothing else to do	I don't lay my head down	1975
When you're gone	Mother nature	1975
Terug naar de kust	Life is going on	1976
Love was in your eyes	Dr. Brian	1976
Make the man love me	The letter	1976
Blackbird	Make the man love me	1976
Jij alleen	He never said his name	1977
Fools together	Empty place, empty space	1977
You and I	It hurts	1978
Ooh	Take it easy	1979
Nighttime	Take it easy	1979
Amsterdam	Take it easy	1980
Amsterdam (sung in Dutch)	Amsterdam (sung in English)	1980
Amsterdam (sung in English)	Amsterdam (sung in French)	1980
Why your lady says goodbye	Sail around the world	1980
Be my friend	Why your lady says goodbye	1980
Be my lover tonight	Together	1981
I've got you, you've got me	Won't you tell me	1983
Still can't believe it	On the beat (instrumental)	1983
You are my hope	Say hello again	1985
Verloren tijd	Heel verliefd	1989
Papa is lief	Heel verliefd	1989
Terug naar de kust	Heel gewoon	1990
Only love	A night in the city	1997
Old friend	Live in my dreams	1999

==== Long Play ====
Title	Year
When you're gone	1976
Fools together	1977
Nighttime	1979
Amsterdam	1980
Leuk voor Later (Nice-to-have for Later)	1989
Leuk voor Later (remastered + bonus track)	2025

=== Mouth & MacNeal ===
==== Albums ====
Year	Title
1971	Mouth & MacNeal
1972	Hello and Thank You
1972	Mouth & MacNeal II
1974	Ik zie een ster (I See a Star)

==== Singles ====
Single	Year
"Hey, You Love"	1971
"How Do You Do"	1971
"Hello-A"	1972
"You-Kou-La-Le-Lou-Pi"	1972
"Bat-Te-Ring-Ram"	1973
"Medizinmann" (Germany-only release)	1973
"Minnie, Minnie"	1973
"Do You Wanna Do It"	1973
"Wie denn wo denn was denn" (Germany-only release)	1973
"I See a Star"	1974
"Ik zie een ster (I see a star)"	1974
"Ah! l'amore"	1974
"Ein gold'ner Stern (I see a star)" (Germany-only release)	1974
"We're Gonna Have a Party"	1974
"L'amour au pas" (France and Belgium-only release)	1974

Awards and achievements
Preceded by Xandra with "Colorado"	Netherlands in the Eurovision Song Contest; 1980	Succeeded by Linda Williams with "Het is een wonder"
