= Cokane in My Brain =

Single by Dillinger

from the album CB 200
- Released: 1976
- Recorded: 1976
- Genre: Reggae
- Length: 2:44
- Label: Island
- Songwriter(s): Lester Randal Bullock
- Producer(s): Dillinger; Joseph "Jo Jo" Hoo Kim

"Cokane in My Brain" is a song written and performed by the Jamaican musician Dillinger. It was released as a single from his second studio album CB 200 in 1976 by Island Records. The song was produced by Joseph "Jo Jo" Hoo Kim, who used samples of People's Choice's "Do It Any Way You Wanna" and Enoch Light's "Hijack".

"Cokane in My Brain" is Dillinger's most successful single, reaching number one in the Netherlands, number two in Belgium and number 35 in Germany.

== Track listing ==
7", vinyl
No.	Title	Length
1.	"Cokane in My Brain"	2:44
2.	"Power Bank"	3:09

7", vinyl
No.	Title	Length
1.	"Cokane in My Brain"	2:44
2.	"C.B. 200"	3:02

12", Maxi single
No.	Title	Length
1.	"Cokane in My Brain"	5:09
2.	"Buckingham Palace"	2:55
3.	"Ragnampiza"	4:11

== Personnel ==
- John Dent – mastering

== Charts ==
=== Weekly charts ===
Chart (1977)	Peak position
Belgium (Ultratop 50 Flanders)	2
Belgium (Ultratop 50 Wallonia)	12
Netherlands (Dutch Top 40)	1
Netherlands (Single Top 100)	1
West Germany (GfK)	35

=== Year-end charts ===
Chart (1977)	Position
Belgium (Ultratop Flanders)	41
Netherlands (Dutch Top 40)	8
Netherlands (Single Top 100)	7

== See also ==
- List of Dutch Top 40 number-one singles of 1977
