= Boogie Down U.S.A. =

Studio album by People's Choice
- Released: 1975
- Studio: Sigma Sound, Philadelphia, Pennsylvania
- Genre: Disco, funk
- Label: TSOP
- Producer: Kenneth Gamble, Leon Huff

People's Choice chronology
Boogie Down U.S.A. (1975)	We Got the Rhythm (1976)

Singles from Boogie Down U.S.A.
- 1. "Do It Any Way You Wanna" Released: June 17, 1975

Professional ratings
Review scores
Source	Rating
AllMusic	4/5 stars

Boogie Down U.S.A. is the debut studio album recorded by American funk band People's Choice, released in 1975 on the TSOP label.

== Chart performance ==
The album peaked at No. 7 on the R&B albums chart. It also reached No. 56 on the Billboard 200. The album features the single, "Do It Any Way You Wanna", which peaked at No. 1 on the Hot Soul Singles chart and No. 11 on the Billboard Hot 100. "Nursery Rhymes" also charted at No. 22 on the Hot Soul Singles chart and No. 93 on the Billboard Hot 100.

== Track listing ==
Side one
No.	Title	Writer(s)	Length
1.	"Do It Any Way You Wanna"	Leon Huff	3:18
2.	"Are You Sure"	Leon Huff, John Whitehead, Gene McFadden	3:28
3.	"Mickey D's"	Harry Coombs, Leon Huff, Frank Brunson	3:35
4.	"I'm Leaving You"	Leon Huff	5:38
5.	"The Sooner You Get Here"	Leon Huff, John Whitehead, Gene McFadden	4:06

Side two
No.	Title	Writer(s)	Length
6.	"Boogie Down U.S.A."	Leon Huff	3:39
7.	"Nursery Rhymes"	Leon Huff, Cary Gilbert	6:06
8.	"Party Is a Groovy Thing"	Frank Brunson	2:56
9.	"If You Want Me Back"	Leon Huff, John Whitehead, Gene McFadden	3:05
10.	"Don't Send Me Away"	Leon Huff	3:37

== Personnel ==
People's Choice

- Frankie Brunson – lead vocals, keyboards
- David Thompson – percussion
- Roger Andrews – bass
- Guy Fiske – guitar

Additional Musicians/Personnel

- Leno Zachery – saxophone
- MFSB – horns
- Bobby Eli, Norman Harris – guitar
- Victor Carstarphen – organ
