= We Got the Rhythm =

Studio album by People's Choice
- Released: 1976
- Recorded: Sigma Sound, Philadelphia, Pennsylvania
- Genre: Disco, funk
- Label: TSOP
- Producer: Kenneth Gamble, Leon Huff

People's Choice chronology
Boogie Down U.S.A. (1975)	We Got the Rhythm (1976)	Turn Me Loose (1978)

Professional ratings
Review scores
Source	Rating
AllMusic	3/5 stars

We Got the Rhythm is the second studio album recorded by American funk band People's Choice, released in 1976 on the TSOP label.

== Chart performance ==
The album peaked at No. 38 on the R&B albums chart. It also reached No. 174 on the Billboard 200. The album features the single, "Here We Go Again", which peaked at No. 52 on the Hot Soul Singles chart. "Movin' in All Directions" also charted at No. 52 on the Hot Soul Singles chart.

== Track listing ==
Side one
No.	Title	Writer(s)	Length
1.	"Here We Go Again"	Leon Huff	4:55
2.	"Jam, Jam, Jam (All Night Long)"	Leon Huff, Frank Brunson	3:38
3.	"We Got the Rhythm"	Frank Brunson, Darnell Jordan	3:32
4.	"Cold Blooded & Down-Right-Funky"	Leon Huff, Frank Brunson	4:18

Side two
No.	Title	Writer(s)	Length
5.	"Movin' in All Directions"	Leon Huff, Darnell Jordan, Donald Ford	6:38
6.	"Opus-de-Funk"	Leon Huff	5:58
7.	"A Mellow Mood"	Leon Huff	5:05

== Personnel ==
People's Choice

- Frankie Brunson – lead vocals, keyboards
- David Thompson – percussion
- Roger Andrews – bass
- Guy Fiske – lead guitar
- Darnell Jordan – rhythm guitar
- Donald Ford – keyboards

Additional Musicians/Personnel

- Leon Huff, John Whitehead, Gene McFadden, Phil Terry – background vocals on "Cold Blooded & Down-Right-Funky", "Jam, Jam, Jam (All Night Long)", "Here We Go Again", and "Movin' in All Direction"
- Leon Huff – synthesizer on "Opus-de-Funk"
- Sam Peake – saxophone on "Opus-de-Funk"
- Victor Carstarphen – organ on "Opus-de-Funk"
