= List of Dutch Top 40 number-one singles of 1962 =

These hits topped the Dutch Top 40 in 1962.

Issue Date	Song	Artist(s)	Reference
6 January	"I'm Gonna Knock on Your Door"	Eddie Hodges	
13 January	"I'm Gonna Knock on Your Door"	Eddie Hodges	
30 January	"I'm Gonna Knock on Your Door"	Eddie Hodges	
6 February	"Little Ship"	Blue Diamonds	
13 February	"Little Ship"	Blue Diamonds	
20 February	"Little Ship"	Blue Diamonds	
27 February	"Mexico"	Bob Moore	
6 March	"Mexico"	Bob Moore	
13 March	"Mexico"	Bob Moore	
20 March	"Mexico"	Bob Moore	
27 March	"Let's Twist Again"	Chubby Checker	
3 April	"Let's Twist Again"	Chubby Checker	
10 April	"Let's Twist Again"	Chubby Checker	
17 April	"Let's Twist Again"	Chubby Checker	
24 April	"The Young Ones"	Cliff Richard	
1 May	"The Young Ones"	Cliff Richard	
8 May	"The Young Ones"	Cliff Richard	
15 May	"The Young Ones"	Cliff Richard	
22 May	"The Young Ones"	Cliff Richard	
29 May	"The Young Ones"	Cliff Richard	
6 June	"Zwei kleine Italiener"	Conny Froboess	
13 June	"Zwei kleine Italiener"	Conny Froboess	
20 June	"Zwei kleine Italiener"	Conny Froboess	
27 June	"Zwei kleine Italiener"	Conny Froboess	
4 July	"Zwei kleine Italiener"	Conny Froboess	
11 July	"Zwei kleine Italiener"	Conny Froboess	
18 July	"Zwei kleine Italiener"	Conny Froboess	
25 July	"Zwei kleine Italiener"	Conny Froboess	
1 August	"Good Luck Charm"	Elvis Presley	
8 August	"Good Luck Charm"	Elvis Presley	
15 August	"Good Luck Charm"	Elvis Presley	
22 August	"Do You Want to Dance"	Cliff Richard	
29 August	"Do You Want to Dance"	Cliff Richard	
5 September	"Do You Want to Dance"	Cliff Richard	
12 September	"Do You Want to Dance"	Cliff Richard	
19 September	"I Can't Stop Loving You"	Ray Charles	
26 September	"I Can't Stop Loving You"	Ray Charles	
3 October	"I Can't Stop Loving You"	Ray Charles	
10 October	"I Can't Stop Loving You"	Ray Charles	
17 October	"Brandend Zand"	Anneke Grönloh	
24 October	"Brandend Zand"	Anneke Grönloh	
31 October	"Speedy Gonzales"	Pat Boone	
7 November	"Speedy Gonzales"	Pat Boone	
14 November	"Speedy Gonzales"	Pat Boone	
21 November	"Speedy Gonzales"	Pat Boone	
28 November	"Paradiso"	Anneke Grönloh	
5 December	"Paradiso"	Anneke Grönloh	
12 December	"Paradiso"	Anneke Grönloh	
19 December	"Paradiso"	Anneke Grönloh	
26 December	"Paradiso"	Anneke Grönloh	

== See also ==
- 1962 in music
