= Dillinger (musician) =

Jamaican musician (born 1953)

- Born: Lester Randal Bullock; 25 June 1953 (age 72)
- Origin: Kingston, Jamaica
- Genres: Reggae; dancehall; Toasting (Jamaican music)
- Instrument: Vocals
- Years active: 1970–present
- Labels: Studio One; Island; Third World; Jamaica Sound; A&M; Scandal Bag

Lester Randal Bullock (born 25 June 1953), better known by the stage name Dillinger, is a Jamaican reggae musician. He was part of the second wave of deejay toasters who rose to prominence during the mid-1970s.

== Biography ==
Born in Kingston, Jamaica, as a young man Dillinger would hang around Dennis Alcapone's El Paso sound system. This exposure would eventually lead to work in 1971, as a deejay on the Prince Jackie and El Paso sound systems, initially influenced by Big Youth, U Roy, and Dennis Alcapone, and performing as "Dennis Alcapone Jr.". The first record producer he worked with was Lee "Scratch" Perry, who decided that Bullock should change his name to Dillinger, after gangster John Dillinger. Perry produced his first recording session, from which "Dub Organizer" was released as a single. Several other Perry-produced singles followed, but with limited success.

In 1974, he recorded "Freshly" for Yabby You, which brought him his first hit, and 1975 saw a slew of releases with a variety of producers including Augustus Pablo ("Brace a Boy"), Joseph Hoo Kim ("CB 200"), Winston Holness ("Flat Foot Hustling"), and Coxsone Dodd ("Killer Man Jaro").

Albums for Dodd (Ready Natty Dreadie) and Hoo Kim (CB 200) would soon follow. His hit "Cocaine in My Brain", produced by Hoo Kim (which relied heavily on "Do It Any Way You Wanna" by People's Choice) was hugely popular internationally, and was a number-one hit in the Netherlands. Dillinger spent a lot of time in England during the heyday of punk rock, and in 1978, along with Leroy Smart and Delroy Wilson, was referenced by lyricist Joe Strummer in The Clash's track, "(White Man) In Hammersmith Palais". That same year, he had appeared in the film Rockers, directed by Ted Bafaloukos, which also included his song "Stumbling Block."

His third album, Clash, a Clement Bushay-produced duel with Trinity, sold poorly, as did a second album produced by Hoo Kim (Bionic Dread). He tried to recapture the success of "Cocaine" in 1979 with the similarly themed "Marijuana in My Brain". The single, and an album of the same name, were moderately successful, prompting A&M Records to sign him. Dillinger's deal with A&M resulted in the 1980 album Badder Than Them, but after failing to sell well he was dropped by the label.

His recorded output dropped in the second half of the 1980s, although he also started producing other artists. He returned to recording more regularly in the early 1990s, but didn't repeat his earlier success. He went on to start his own Scandal Bag label.

He has continued to record and perform into the 21st century, and toured internationally with Trinity and Ranking Joe in 2000, and with Yellowman in 2014.

== Album discography ==
- Ready Natty Dreadie (1975), Studio One - released in 1978 as Babylon Fever
- CB 200 (1976), Island
- Bionic Dread (1976), Black Swan
- Clash (1977), Burning Sounds - with Trinity
- Talkin' Blues (1977), Magnum
- Top Ranking Dillinger (1977), Third World
- Superstar (1977), Weedbeat
- Cornbread (1978), Jamaica Sound
- Non Stop Disco Style (1978), Clocktower
- Answer My Questions (1979), Third World
- Marijuana in My Brain (1979), Jamaica Sound
- Funky Punk Rock to the Music (1979), Bellaphon
- Live at the Music Machine (1979), Jamaica Sound
- Dub Organiser (197?), Scandal Bag
- Cup of Tea (1980), Jamaica Sound
- Badder Than Them (1981), A&M
- Corn Bread (1983), Vista Sounds
- Live at London (1981), Vista Sounds - with Clint Eastwood
- Join The Queue (1983), Oak Sounds
- King Pharaoh (1984), Blue Moon
- Best of Live (1984), Vista Sounds
- Cocaine (1984), New Cross
- Tribal War (1986), New Cross
- 3 Piece Suit (1993), Culture Press
- Say No To Drugs (1993), Lagoon
- Youthman Veteran (2001), Jah Warrior
- At King Tubby's (2006), Attack
- Ten To One (2007), Dream Catcher

There have also been dozens of compilation albums of Dillinger's work released on various record labels since the 1980s.
