= List of Dutch Top 40 number-one singles of 1977 =

These hits topped the Dutch Top 40 in 1977.

Issue Date	Song	Artist(s)	Reference
1 January	"If You Leave Me Now"	Chicago	
8 January	"Somebody to Love"	Queen	
15 January	"Somebody to Love"	Queen	
22 January	"Somebody to Love"	Queen	
29 January	"Sunny"	Boney M.	
5 February	"Living Next Door to Alice"	Smokie	
12 February	"Living Next Door to Alice"	Smokie	
19 February	"Living Next Door to Alice"	Smokie	
26 February	"Don't Cry for Me Argentina"	Julie Covington	
5 March	"Don't Cry for Me Argentina"	Julie Covington	
12 March	"Don't Cry for Me Argentina"	Julie Covington	
19 March	"Don't Cry for Me Argentina"	Julie Covington	
26 March	"Go Your Own Way"	Fleetwood Mac	
2 April	"Go Your Own Way"	Fleetwood Mac	
9 April	"Go Your Own Way"	Fleetwood Mac	
16 April	"Lay Back in the Arms of Someone"	Smokie	
23 April	"Lay Back in the Arms of Someone"	Smokie	
30 April	"My Broken Souvenirs"	Pussycat	
7 May	"Non Stop Dance"	Gibson Brothers	
14 May	"Non Stop Dance"	Gibson Brothers	
21 May	"You're My World"	Guys 'n' Dolls	
28 May	"You're My World"	Guys 'n' Dolls	
4 June	"You're My World"	Guys 'n' Dolls	
11 June	"Ma Baker"	Boney M.	
18 June	"Ma Baker"	Boney M.	
25 June	"Ma Baker"	Boney M.	
2 July	"Ma Baker"	Boney M.	
9 July	"Ma Baker"	Boney M.	
16 July	"Ma Baker"	Boney M.	
23 July	"Yes Sir, I Can Boogie"	Baccara	
30 July	"Yes Sir, I Can Boogie"	Baccara	
6 August	"Yes Sir, I Can Boogie"	Baccara	
13 August	"Cokane in My Brain"	Dillinger	
20 August	"Cokane in My Brain"	Dillinger	
27 August	"Cokane in My Brain"	Dillinger	
3 September	"Cokane in My Brain"	Dillinger	
10 September	"I Feel Love"	Donna Summer	
17 September	"Sorry, I'm a Lady"	Baccara	
24 September	"I Remember Elvis Presley"	Danny Mirror	
1 October	"I Remember Elvis Presley"	Danny Mirror	
8 October	"Do You Remember"	Long Tall Ernie and the Shakers	
15 October	"Do You Remember"	Long Tall Ernie and the Shakers	
22 October	"Do You Remember"	Long Tall Ernie and the Shakers	
29 October	"Do You Remember"	Long Tall Ernie and the Shakers	
5 November	"'t Smurfenlied"	Vader Abraham	
12 November	"'t Smurfenlied"	Vader Abraham	
19 November	"'t Smurfenlied"	Vader Abraham	
26 November	"'t Smurfenlied"	Vader Abraham	
3 December	"'t Smurfenlied"	Vader Abraham	
10 December	"'t Smurfenlied"	Vader Abraham	
17 December	"'t Smurfenlied"	Vader Abraham	
24 December	"Mull of Kintyre"	Wings	
31 December	"Mull of Kintyre"	Wings	

== See also ==
- 1977 in music
