= Ben Cramer =

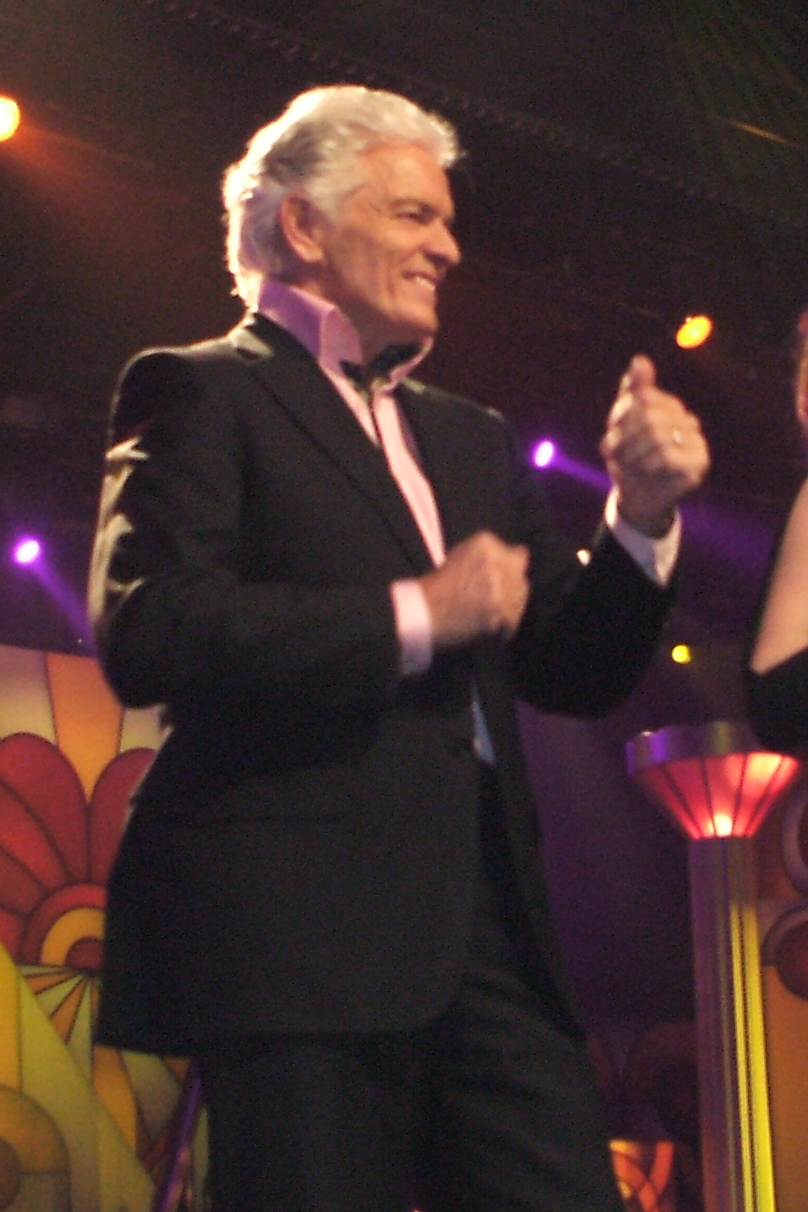
- Ben Cramer in 2011

Background information
- Born: Ben Kramer; 17 February 1947 (age 79)
- Origin: Amsterdam, Netherlands
- Genres: Pop, musical theatre
- Occupation: Singer
- Website: Ben Cramer

Ben Cramer (born Bernardus Kramer; 17 February 1947) is a Dutch singer who represented the Netherlands in the 1973 Eurovision Song Contest.

== Music career ==
=== Early years ===
Cramer was born in Amsterdam. He made his television debut in 1966 with his backing group the Spaklings, and was spotted by singer Annie de Reuver, who helped him obtain a record deal. In 1967, his first single, "Zai zai zai", became a hit, reaching No. 7 on the Dutch chart. The follow-up "Dans met mij" also peaked at No. 7, and he would have a string of successful records in the late 1960s and early 1970s. His most fondly-remembered record is "De Clown" from 1971.

== Eurovision Song Contest ==
In 1970, Cramer took part in the Dutch Eurovision selection with the song "Julia", which came fourth. He returned in 1973, this time singing all four songs, from which "De oude muzikant" ("The Old Musician") was chosen as the Dutch entry for the 18th Eurovision Song Contest, held on 7 April in Luxembourg City. "De oude muzikant" was seen as a rather old-fashioned song, and finished the evening in 14th place of 17 entries.

Cramer returned to Eurovision in 1981 with two songs, "Marianne" and "Retour", in the Dutch selection, but both finished well down the field.

Cramer was associated with the 1988 Contest providing radio commentary for Dutch listeners.

=== Later career ===
Cramer continued to enjoy periodic chart success through the 1970s; his last charting single – not including the "Koningslied" – was "Alles is anders" in 1980. The 1980s were relatively quiet. In 1989, he starred as Juan Perón in the musical Evita, and went on to appear in many Dutch-language stage productions, such as Chicago and The Phantom of the Opera. He has since appeared in TV programmes such as the drama series Westenwind and the Dutch Celebrity Big Brother, and continues his stage career.

Cramer was one of the artists who recorded the song Shalom from Holland (written by Simon Hammelburg and Ron Klipstein) as a token of solidarity to the Israeli people, threatened by missiles from Iraq, during the first Gulf War in 1991.

In 2009, along with a number of other Dutch Eurovision veterans, Cramer was a special guest at that year's televised Eurovision selection.

Awards and achievements
Preceded by Sandra & Andres with "Als het om de liefde gaat"	Netherlands in the Eurovision Song Contest; 1973	Succeeded by Mouth & MacNeal with "I See A Star"
