= De oude muzikant =

1973 song by Ben Cramer

Single by Ben Cramer
- Language: Dutch
- Released: 1973
- Genre: Pop, Schlager
- Length: 3:28
- Label: Elf Provinciën, Philips
- Songwriter: Pierre Kartner

Ben Cramer singles chronology
"Slavin van de nacht" (1972)	"De oude muzikant" (1973)	"Veronica vrij" (1973)

Eurovision Song Contest 1973 entry
- Country: Netherlands
- Artist: Ben Cramer
- Language: Dutch
- Conductor: Harry van Hoof

Finals performance
- Final result: 14th
- Final points: 69

Entry chronology
- ◄ "Als het om de liefde gaat" (1972)
- "I See a Star" (1974) ►

De oude muzikant ("The Old Musician") is a song written and composed by Pierre Kartner and performed by Dutch singer Ben Cramer. It was released in 1973 as a 45 rpm single.

The song represented the Netherlands in the Eurovision Song Contest 1973.

The song was also recorded by Ben Cramer in German (Der alte Musikant), English (The Old Street Musician), and French (Pour être vraiment sincère).

== At Eurovision ==
=== Selection ===
The song was selected on 28 February 1973 by the NOS during the Nationaal Songfestival 1973 to represent the Netherlands at the Eurovision Song Contest 1973 on 7 April in Luxembourg, in the Grand Duchy of Luxembourg.

=== In Luxembourg ===
The song was performed entirely in Dutch, the official language of the Netherlands, although countries were free to choose their language between 1973 and 1976. The orchestra was conducted by Harry van Hoof.

De oude muzikant was the thirteenth song performed on the night, following You're Summer by Nova for Sweden and preceding Do I Dream? by Maxi for Ireland.

At the close of voting, it received 69 points, placing 14th out of 17 entries.

== Track listing ==
All tracks are written by yes.

Netherlands 45 rpm single
No.	Title	Writer(s)	Length
1.	"De oude muzikant"	Pierre Kartner
2.	"Kom Sylvia dans met mij"	Frans Peters, Jacques Zwart

== Charts ==
=== Weekly charts ===
Chart (1973)	Peak position
Belgium (Flanders BRT Top 30)	20
Netherlands (Dutch Top 40)	13
Netherlands (Nationale Hitparade)	19

== Release history ==
Country or region	Title	Date	Format	Label
Germany	Der alte Musikant	1973	45 rpm record	Philips
Belgium ·	De oude muzikant	1973	45 rpm record	Elf Provinciën
Belgium ·	Pour être vraiment sincère	1973	45 rpm record	Omega International
Spain	The Old Street Musician	1973	45 rpm record	Philips
France	Pour être vraiment sincère	1973	45 rpm record	Philips
Netherlands ·	De oude muzikant	1973	45 rpm record	Elf Provinciën
Netherlands ·	The Old Street Musician	1973	45 rpm record	Philips
Portugal	The Old Street Musician	1973	45 rpm record	Philips
United Kingdom	The Old Street Musician	1973	45 rpm record	Philips
Denmark Norway Sweden Scandinavia	The Old Street Musician	1973	45 rpm record	Philips
