= Annie de Reuver =

Dutch singer and record producer

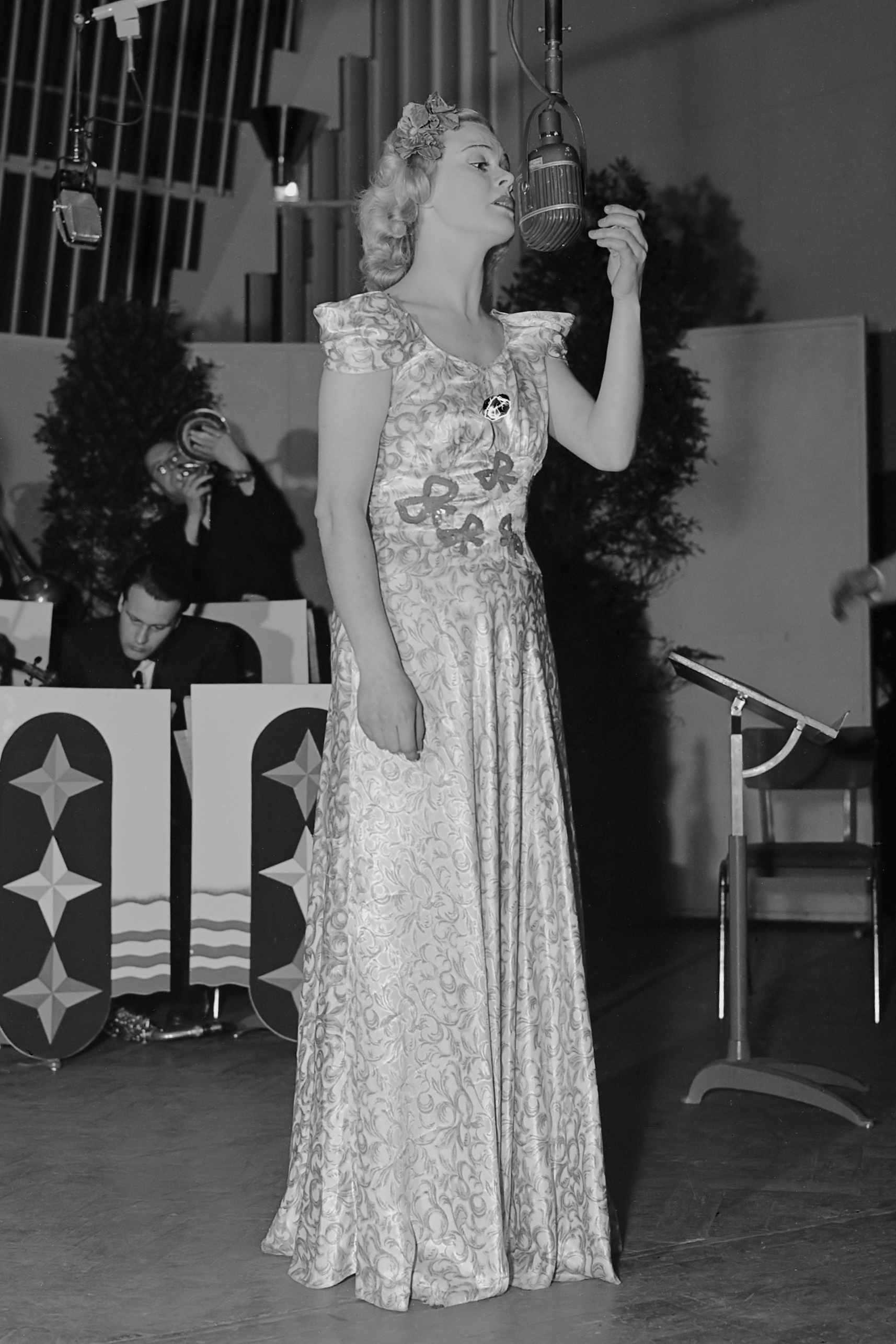
- Annie de Reuver in 1946
- Born: Anna Maria Clasina de Reuver; 19 February 1917; Rotterdam, Netherlands
- Died: 1 January 2016 (aged 98); Rotterdam, Netherlands
- Occupations: Singer, record producer
- Years active: 1933–1990s
- Spouses: 4 (div.)

Anna Maria Clasina de Reuver (19 February 1917 – 1 January 2016) was a Dutch singer and record producer. During the 1940s and 1950s she was one of the most popular orchestra singers in the Netherlands. She gained prominence as a jazz and light music vocalist before she became a talent scout and producer in the Dutch recording industry.

== Early life ==
Annie de Reuver was born and raised in the Bospolder neighborhood of Rotterdam in a lower-middle-class family. Her father worked as a shop assistant and trader, and her mother was a seamstress. She was the eldest of five children, two of whom died in infancy from measles. After completing primary school, De Reuver attended household school briefly before working as a domestic worker and shop assistant. She did not have a happy childhood due to constant family conflicts.

== Singing career ==
In 1933, at the age of sixteen, De Reuver began singing in amateur ensembles. Her breakthrough came in late 1934 when she was invited to sing with orchestra The Ramblers at the Rotterdam venue Pschorr. She soon appeared with the orchestra on live radio broadcasts and in January 1935 recorded with them alongside American tenor saxophonist Coleman Hawkins. These recordings were released internationally and established her reputation as a “lady crooner”, initially in English and later increasingly in Dutch.

During the German occupation of the Netherlands, De Reuver continued performing with various orchestras after obtaining the required permit from the Nederlandsche Kultuurkamer. Following the 1941 ban on English-language songs, she focused on French and Dutch repertoire. After the liberation, De Reuver performed for Allied officers in Brussels before she returned to the Netherlands, where she became the regular singer of The Skymasters, the orchestra of the public broadcaster AVRO. With this ensemble she appeared frequently on radio and recorded extensively. Her best-known song was Kijk eens in de poppetjes van mijn ogen (1952), which became closely associated with her career. She also performed regularly with guitarist and singer Eddy Christiani in radio broadcasts with ensemble De Avroleans. De Reuver and Christiani were repeatedly named the Netherlands' leading vocalists during this period.

In the 1950s and 1960s Annie toured with the orchestra De Reuvertjes, visiting Dutch soldiers in the Netherlands, Germany and on ships.

== Record production and later work ==
From the late 1960s onward, as popular music tastes shifted, De Reuver increasingly focused on production and artist development. In 1967 she joined the record label Dureco as a programme leader, where she was involved in discovering and producing new Dutch talent, including Ben Cramer, Oscar Harris and songwriter Pierre Kartner. After leaving Dureco, De Reuver worked for music label Telstar, promoting and producing recordings and maintaining close contacts with broadcasters. In 1987 she produced the record Kleine Jodeljongen by Manke Nelis. Alongside this work, she also presented radio programmes for the TROS and Radio Rijnmond.

== Personal life ==
De Reuver married four times. All of them ended at her initiative, in most cases due to adultery on one or both sides. She did not have children with any of her husbands. In 1994 De Reuver received the Erasmus Award from the city of Rotterdam and was appointed a member of the Order of Orange-Nassau in recognition of her long career and contributions to Dutch popular music. In her later years she occasionally performed at celebratory events and appeared with fellow veteran performers under the name “Toppers van Toen”.

== Later life and death ==
Annie de Reuver retired in the early 1990s. She died on 1 January 2016 at the age of 98 in her apartment in Rotterdam from complications following surgery for a broken hip sustained in a fall.
