= Mouth and MacNeal =

Dutch pop duo

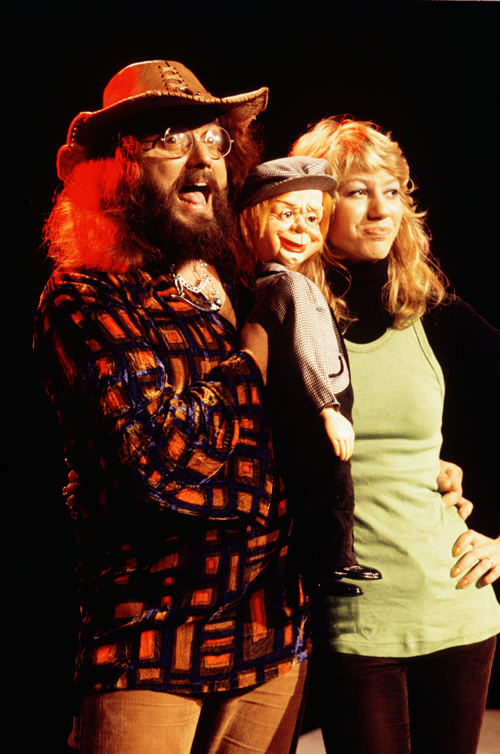
- Mouth and MacNeal on the Dutch television programme TopPop in 1973

Background information
- Origin: Netherlands
- Genres: Pop, rock
- Years active: 1971 – 1974
- Labels: London; UAR; WBR; Fontana; Philips; DME
- Past members: Willem Duyn (deceased); Maggie MacNeal

Mouth and MacNeal were a Dutch pop duo that enjoyed commercial success in the 1970s. Their recording of "How Do You Do" in 1971 topped the Dutch chart and became a US top ten hit and number 2 in Canada. They represented the Netherlands at the Eurovision Song Contest 1974, finishing third with the song "I See a Star", which went on to become a UK top ten hit.

== Career ==
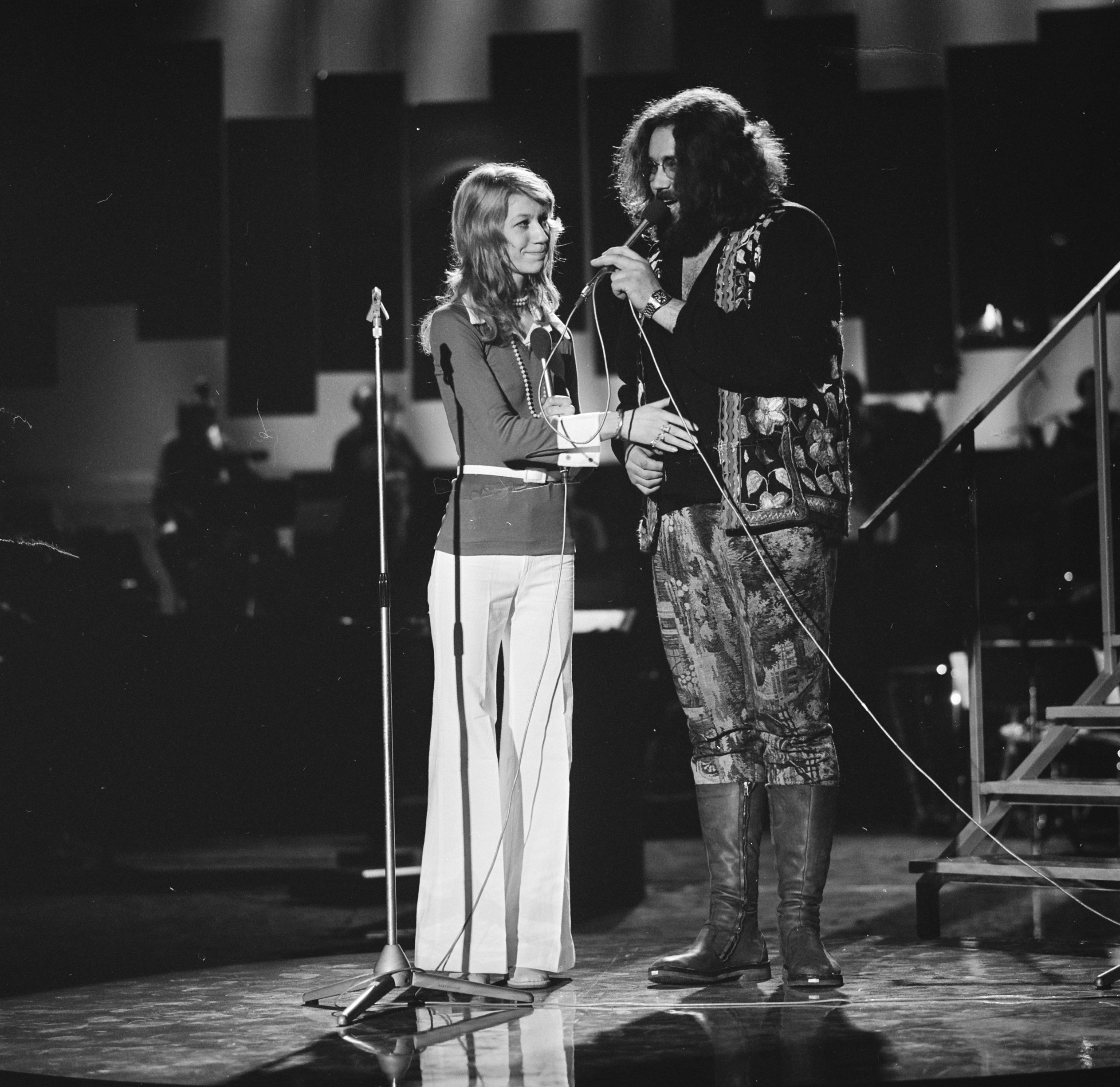
Mouth & MacNeal rehearsing for the Nationaal Songfestival 1974 in Utrecht

They were formed in 1971 when record producer Hans van Hemert brought together Big Mouth (born Willem Duyn) and Maggie MacNeal (born Sjoukje van't Spijker). Big Mouth had previously sung in a number of 1960s bands, including Speedway. MacNeal had released one solo single before teaming up with Big Mouth, a cover of Marvin Gaye's "I Heard It Through the Grapevine", also produced by van Hemert.

The duo released their first single, "Hey You Love", which reached #5 in the Dutch Top 40, while the next two singles "How Do You Do" and "Hello-A" both reached #1 in the Netherlands. In 1972, "How Do You Do" reached the top of the charts throughout Continental Europe and Scandinavia and peaked at number 32 in Australia, made popular by local bands Jigsaw and Windows. "How Do You Do" was made popular in the United States by radio personality Jim Connors and the song eventually reached #8 in the U.S. in July 1972. "How Do You Do" spent 19 weeks in the Billboard Hot 100 and won the R.I.A.A. gold disc on 2 August 1972. It sold over a million copies in the U.S. alone, and global sales exceeded two million.

This propelled their 1972 album Hey You Love / How Do You Do into the Billboard 200 (US #77). More hit singles followed in 1973, and in 1974 Mouth and MacNeal represented the Netherlands in the Eurovision Song Contest with their song "I See a Star", placing third to ABBA and Gigliola Cinquetti. The song became a UK top ten hit, peaking at #8.

In December 1974, shortly after their success with "I See a Star", Mouth and MacNeal split up. Big Mouth continued with Ingrid Kup (who would later become his wife) as "Big Mouth and Little Eve", whereas MacNeal resumed her solo career. MacNeal went on to represent the Netherlands again at the Eurovision Song Contest 1980 held in The Hague, singing "Amsterdam", finishing fifth in a field of nineteen.

By then, Big Mouth was also pursuing a solo career; under his own name he charted with Dutch-language versions of Frankie Miller's "Darlin" (the song was renamed "Willem") and "Chattanooga Choo Choo" (based on German singer Udo Lindenberg's adaptation). In 1992 Duyn recorded Tenpole Tudor's Wünderbar in collaboration with rock band Normaal while their own frontman Bennie Jolink recovered from a motorcycle accident.

Duyn died from a heart attack in his hometown of Roswinkel on 4 December 2004. He was 67.

MacNeal dropped her pseudonym and performed as Sjoukje Smit; in 2008 she reformed Mouth and MacNeal with Arie Ribbens replacing Duyn, but with no success.

On 21 March 2012 Roel Smit published the Mouth and MacNeal biography; Mouth & MacNeal, duo tegen wil en dank.

== Discography ==
=== Albums ===
- Mouth & MacNeal (1971)
- Hello and Thank You (1972)
- How Do You Do (1972) (re-release of Mouth & MacNeal) – US #77, CAN #35
- Mouth & MacNeal II (1972)
- Pocketful of Hits (1973)
- Ik zee een ster (1974) (released elsewhere as I See a Star) – NL #9, NOR #20, SWE #6
- Singles (1995)
- How Do You Do (1999) (not the same as 1972 album)
- Absolutely the Best (2000)
- The Singles + (2001)

=== Singles ===
Year	Single	Peak chart positions														
Year	Single	NL	AUS	AUT	BE (FLA)	BE (WA)	CAN	DEN	GER	IRE	NOR	NZ	SWE	SWI	UK	US
1971	"Hey, You Love"	3	—	—	—	—	45	—	—	—	—	—	—	—	—	87
1971	"How Do You Do"	1	32	—	1	1	2	1	5	—	—	1	—	1	—	8
1972	"Hello-A"	1	95	13	1	1	95	3	1	—	8	4	1	2	—	—
1972	"You-Kou-La-Le-Lou-Pi"	6	—	—	7	48	—	—	15	—	—	—	—	—	—	—
1973	"Bat-Te-Ring-Ram"	19	—	—	22	—	—	—	—	—	—	—	—	—	—	—
1973	"Medizinmann" (Germany-only release)	—	—	—	—	—	—	—	—	—	—	—	—	—	—	—
1973	"Minnie, Minnie"	11	57	17	20	—	—	—	—	—	—	—	—	—	—	—
1973	"Do You Wanna Do It"	18	—	—	27	—	—	—	—	—	—	—	—	—	—	—
1973	"Wie denn wo denn was denn" (Germany-only release)	—	—	—	—	—	—	—	—	—	—	—	—	—	—	—
1974	"I See a Star"	—	—	—	—	32	—	25	—	1	3	—	3	—	8	—
1974	"Ik zie een ster (I see a star)"	3	—	—	4	—	—	—	—	—	—	—	—	—	—	—
1974	"Ah! l'amore"	11	—	—	28	—	—	—	—	—	—	—	—	—	—	—
1974	"Ein gold'ner Stern (I see a star)" (Germany-only release)	—	—	—	—	—	—	—	—	—	—	—	—	—	—	—
1974	"We're Gonna Have a Party"	—	—	—	—	—	—	—	—	—	—	—	—	—	—	—
1974	"L'amour au pas" (France and Belgium-only release)	—	—	—	—	—	—	—	—	—	—	—	—	—	—	—
"—" denotes releases that did not chart or were not released in that territory.

== References in popular culture ==
The rapper Eminem used a sample of the song "Land of Milk and Honey" which is on the B-side of the single How Do You Do.

Mouth and MacNeal were parodied by two members of television-satirists Farce Majeure; "How Do You Do" became a vow to steer clear of junk food, "Youkoulaleloupi" became "Chocoladeletter" and "Ik Zie Een Ster" (the original Dutch version of "I See a Star") was featured in a Eurovision Song Contest parody as "Dit Gaat Te Ver" ("This Goes Too Far").

Awards and achievements
Preceded by Ben Cramer with "De oude muzikant"	Netherlands in the Eurovision Song Contest; 1974	Succeeded by Teach-In with "Ding-A-Dong"
