= List of Dutch Top 40 number-one singles of 1972 =

These hits topped the Dutch Top 40 in 1972.

Issue Date	Song	Artist(s)	Reference
1 January	"How Do You Do"	Mouth & MacNeal	
8 January	"How Do You Do"	Mouth & MacNeal	
15 January	"How Do You Do"	Mouth & MacNeal	
22 January	"Sacramento (A Wonderful Town)"	Middle of the Road	
29 January	"Sacramento (A Wonderful Town)"	Middle of the Road	
5 February	"Sacramento (A Wonderful Town)"	Middle of the Road	
12 February	"Sacramento (A Wonderful Town)"	Middle of the Road	
19 February	"Sacramento (A Wonderful Town)"	Middle of the Road	
26 February	"Sacramento (A Wonderful Town)"	Middle of the Road	
4 March	"Sacramento (A Wonderful Town)"	Middle of the Road	
11 March	"Poppa Joe"	The Sweet	
18 March	"Poppa Joe"	The Sweet	
25 March	"Poppa Joe"	The Sweet	
1 April	"Poppa Joe"	The Sweet	
8 April	"The Talk of All the USA"	Middle of the Road	
15 April	"The Talk of All the USA"	Middle of the Road	
22 April	"Après toi"	Vicky Leandros	
29 April	"Après toi"	Vicky Leandros	
6 May	"Après toi"	Vicky Leandros	
13 May	"Après toi"	Vicky Leandros	
20 May	"Memories"	Earth and Fire	
27 May	"Memories"	Earth and Fire	
3 June	"Hello-A"	Mouth & MacNeal	
10 June	"Hello-A"	Mouth & MacNeal	
17 June	"Hello-A"	Mouth & MacNeal	
24 June	"Hello-A"	Mouth & MacNeal	
1 July	"Hello-A"	Mouth & MacNeal	
8 July	"Hello-A"	Mouth & MacNeal	
15 July	"A Whiter Shade of Pale"	Procol Harum	
22 July	"A Whiter Shade of Pale"	Procol Harum	
29 July	"A Whiter Shade of Pale"	Procol Harum	
5 August	"Un canto a Galicia"	Julio Iglesias	
12 August	"Popcorn"	Hot Butter / The Popcornmakers / Anarchic System / Revolution System	
19 August	"Popcorn"	Hot Butter / The Popcornmakers / Anarchic System / Revolution System	
26 August	"Popcorn"	Hot Butter / The Popcornmakers / Anarchic System / Revolution System	
2 September	"Popcorn"	Hot Butter / The Popcornmakers / Anarchic System / Revolution System	
9 September	"Popcorn"	Hot Butter / The Popcornmakers / Anarchic System / Revolution System	
16 September	"Popcorn"	Hot Butter / The Popcornmakers / Anarchic System / Revolution System	
23 September	"Popcorn"	Hot Butter / The Popcornmakers / Anarchic System / Revolution System	
30 September	"I'll Never Drink Again"	Alexander Curly	
7 October	"I'll Never Drink Again"	Alexander Curly	
14 October	"Sugar Me"	Lynsey de Paul	
21 October	"Sugar Me"	Lynsey de Paul	
28 October	"Sugar Me"	Lynsey de Paul	
4 November	"Sugar Me"	Lynsey de Paul	
11 November	"Ich hab' die Liebe geseh'n"	Vicky Leandros	
18 November	"Ich hab' die Liebe geseh'n"	Vicky Leandros	
25 November	"Ich hab' die Liebe geseh'n"	Vicky Leandros	
2 December	"Ich hab' die Liebe geseh'n"	Vicky Leandros	
9 December	"Ich hab' die Liebe geseh'n"	Vicky Leandros	
16 December	"Crazy Horses"	The Osmonds	
23 December	"Crazy Horses"	The Osmonds	
30 December	"Crazy Horses"	The Osmonds	

== See also ==
- 1972 in music
