= List of Dutch Top 40 number-one singles of 1960 =

These hits topped the Dutch Top 40 in 1960.

Issue Date	Song	Artist(s)	Reference
28 May	"Milord"	Corry Brokken	
4 June	"Milord"	Corry Brokken	
11 June	"Milord"	Corry Brokken	
18 June	"Milord"	Corry Brokken	
25 June	"Milord"	Corry Brokken	
2 July	"Milord"	Corry Brokken	
9 July	"Milord"	Corry Brokken	
16 July	"Milord"	Corry Brokken	
23 July	"Milord"	Corry Brokken	
30 July	"Milord"	Corry Brokken	
6 August	"Kom Van dat dak af"	Peter En Zijn Rockets	
13 August	"Milord"	Corry Brokken	
20 August	"Milord"	Corry Brokken	
27 August	"Milord"	Corry Brokken	
3 September	"Milord"	Corry Brokken	
10 September	"Milord"	Corry Brokken	
17 September	"Milord"	Corry Brokken	
24 September	"It's Now Or Never"	Elvis Presley	
1 October	"Ramona"	The Blue Diamonds	
8 October	"Ramona"	The Blue Diamonds	
15 October	"It's Now or Never"	Elvis Presley	
22 October	"It's Now or Never"	Elvis Presley	
29 October	"It's Now or Never"	Elvis Presley	
5 November	"It's Now or Never"	Elvis Presley	
12 November	"It's Now or Never"	Elvis Presley	
19 November	"It's Now or Never"	Elvis Presley	
26 November	"Ramona"	Blue Diamonds	
3 December	"Ramona"	Blue Diamonds	
10 December	"Ramona"	Blue Diamonds	
17 December	"Ramona"	Blue Diamonds	
24 December	"It's Now or Never"	Elvis Presley	
31 December	"It's Now or Never"	Elvis Presley	

== See also ==
- 1960 in music
