= CB 200 =

Album by Dillinger

Studio album by Dillinger
- Released: 1976
- Recorded: 1975–1976
- Studio: Channel One Recording Studio (Kingston, Jamaica)
- Genre: Reggae
- Length: 30:55
- Label: Island
- Producer: Joseph "Jo Jo" Hoo Kim

Dillinger chronology
Ready Natty Dreadie (1975)	CB 200 (1976)	Bionic Dread (1976)

Singles from CB 200
- 1. "C.B. 200" Released: 1975; 2. "Plantation Height" Released: 1976; 3. "Cokane in My Brain" Released: 1976; 4. "Ragnampaiza" Released: 1977

CB 200 is the second studio album by Jamaican reggae artist Dillinger. It was released in 1976 via Island Records, making it the musician's first album on the label. Recording sessions took place at Channel One Recording Studios in Kingston. Production of the album was entirely handled by Joseph "Jo Jo" Hoo Kim. The album peaked at number 7 in the Netherlands and spawned a hit single "Cokane in My Brain", which became a number-one single in the Netherlands and also reached number 2 in Belgium and number 35 in Germany.

== Critical reception ==
Professional ratings
Review scores
Source	Rating
AllMusic	4.5/5 stars
Tom Hull – on the Web	A−

Stephen Cook of AllMusic said that the album's sound "is dark-hued and rootsy, full of smoky horns and dubby textures that are well suited to Dillinger's dread delivery".

== Track listing ==
All tracks composed by Dillinger

No.	Title	Length
1.	"C.B. 200"	2:37
2.	"No Chuck It"	2:56
3.	"Cokane in My Brain"	2:47
4.	"The General"	3:00
5.	"Power Bank"	3:13
6.	"Plantation Heights"	2:57
7.	"Race Day"	3:58
8.	"Natty Kick Like Lightning"	2:31
9.	"Buckingham Palace"	4:14
10.	"Crankface"	2:42
Total length:		30:55

== Personnel ==
- Lester Bullock – vocals, composer
- Wade "Trinity" Brammer – backing vocals
- Earl "Chinna" Smith – guitar
- Radcliffe "Dougie" Bryan – guitar
- Aston Francis Barrett – bass
- Bertram "Ranchie" McLean – bass
- Oswald Hibbert – keyboards, engineering
- Ansel Collins – keyboards
- Errol "Tarzan" Nelson – keyboards
- Sly Dunbar – drums
- Anthony Basil "Benbow" Creary – drums
- Thomas Matthew McCook – saxophone
- Leslie Wint – trumpet
- Vincent Gordon – trombone
- Joseph "Jo Jo" Hoo Kim – producer, engineer

== Charts ==
Chart (1977)	Peak position
Dutch Albums (Album Top 100)	7
