= List of Dutch Top 40 number-one singles of 1961 =

These hits topped the Dutch Top 40 in 1961.

Issue Date	Song	Artist(s)	Reference
7 January	"It's Now Or Never"	Elvis Presley	
14 January	"Ramona"	Blue Diamonds	
21 January	"Ramona"	Blue Diamonds	
28 January	"Save the Last Dance for Me"	The Drifters	
4 February	"Save the Last Dance for Me"	The Drifters	
11 February	"Save the Last Dance for Me"	The Drifters	
18 February	"Save the Last Dance for Me"	The Drifters	
25 February	"Wooden Heart"	Elvis Presley	
4 March	"Wooden Heart"	Elvis Presley	
11 March	"Wooden Heart"	Elvis Presley	
18 March	"Wooden Heart"	Elvis Presley	
25 March	"Wooden Heart"	Elvis Presley	
1 April	"Wooden Heart"	Elvis Presley	
8 April	"Wooden Heart"	Elvis Presley	
15 April	"Non je ne regrette rien"	Edith Piaf	
22 April	"Non je ne regrette rien"	Edith Piaf	
29 April	"Non je ne regrette rien"	Edith Piaf	
6 May	"Non je ne regrette rien"	Edith Piaf	
13 May	"Wheels"	The String-A-Longs	
20 May	"Wheels"	The String-A-Longs	
27 May	"Wheels"	The String-A-Longs	
3 June	"Wheels"	The String-A-Longs	
10 June	"Wheels"	The String-A-Longs	
17 June	"Non je ne regrette rien"	Edith Piaf	
24 June	"Wheels"	The String-A-Longs	
1 July	"Wheels"	The String-A-Longs	
8 July	"Wheels"	The String-A-Longs	
15 July	"Wheels"	The String-A-Longs	
22 July	"Wheels"	The String-A-Longs	
29 July	"Wheels"	The String-A-Longs	
5 August	"Hello Mary Lou"	Ricky Nelson	
12 August	"Hello Mary Lou"	Ricky Nelson	
19 August	"Hello Mary Lou"	Ricky Nelson	
26 August	"Hello Mary Lou"	Ricky Nelson	
2 September	"Hello Mary Lou"	Ricky Nelson	
9 September	"Hello Mary Lou"	Ricky Nelson	
16 September	"Hello Mary Lou"	Ricky Nelson	
23 September	"Och was ik maar bij moeder thuis gebleven"	Johnny Hoes	
30 September	"Och was ik maar bij moeder thuis gebleven"	Johnny Hoes	
7 October	"Och was ik maar bij moeder thuis gebleven"	Johnny Hoes	
14 October	"Och was ik maar bij moeder thuis gebleven"	Johnny Hoes	
21 October	"Och was ik maar bij moeder thuis gebleven"	Johnny Hoes	
28 October	"Och was ik maar bij moeder thuis gebleven"	Johnny Hoes	
4 November	"Och was ik maar bij moeder thuis gebleven"	Johnny Hoes	
11 November	"Och was ik maar bij moeder thuis gebleven"	Johnny Hoes	
18 November	"Och was ik maar bij moeder thuis gebleven"	Johnny Hoes	
25 November	"Och was ik maar bij moeder thuis gebleven"	Johnny Hoes	
2 December	"Och was ik maar bij moeder thuis gebleven"	Johnny Hoes	
9 December	"Och was ik maar bij moeder thuis gebleven"	Johnny Hoes	
16 December	"I'm Gonna Knock on Your Door"	Eddie Hodges	
23 December	"I'm Gonna Knock on Your Door"	Eddie Hodges	
30 December	"I'm Gonna Knock on Your Door"	Eddie Hodges	

== See also ==
- 1961 in music
