= List of Dutch Top 40 number-one singles of 1965 =

These hits topped the Dutch Top 40 in 1965.

Issue Date	Song	Artist(s)	Reference
2 January	"I Feel Fine"	The Beatles	
9 January	"I Feel Fine"	The Beatles	
16 January	"I Feel Fine"	The Beatles	
23 January	"I Feel Fine"	The Beatles	
30 January	"I Feel Fine"	The Beatles	
6 February	"The French Song" ("Quand le soleil dit bonjour aux montagnes")	Lucille Starr	
13 February	"The French Song" ("Quand le soleil dit bonjour aux montagnes")	Lucille Starr	
20 February	"Letkiss"	Gudrun Jankis / Stig Rauno	
27 February	"Letkiss"	Gudrun Jankis / Stig Rauno	
6 March	"Letkiss"	Gudrun Jankis / Stig Rauno	
13 March	"Letkiss"	Gudrun Jankis / Stig Rauno	
20 March	"Letkiss"	Gudrun Jankis / Stig Rauno	
27 March	"Letkiss"	Gudrun Jankis / Stig Rauno / Dutch Swing College Band	
3 April	"Letkiss"	Gudrun Jankis / Stig Rauno / Dutch Swing College Band	
10 April	"Letkiss"	Gudrun Jankis / Stig Rauno / Dutch Swing College Band	
17 April	"Rock and Roll Music" / "No Reply"	The Beatles	
24 April	"Rock and Roll Music" / "No Reply"	The Beatles	
1 May	"Rock and Roll Music" / "No Reply"	The Beatles	
8 May	"Ticket to Ride"	The Beatles	
15 May	"Ticket to Ride"	The Beatles	
22 May	"Ticket to Ride"	The Beatles	
29 May	"Ticket to Ride"	The Beatles	
5 June	"Ticket to Ride"	The Beatles	
12 June	"Ticket to Ride"	The Beatles	
19 June	"Ticket to Ride"	The Beatles	
26 June	"Ticket to Ride"	The Beatles	
3 July	"Ticket to Ride"	The Beatles	
10 July	"Wooly Bully"	Sam the Sham & The Pharaohs	
17 July	"Wooly Bully"	Sam the Sham & The Pharaohs	
24 July	"Wooly Bully"	Sam the Sham & The Pharaohs	
31 July	"Wooly Bully"	Sam the Sham & The Pharaohs	
7 August	"Help!"	The Beatles	
14 August	"Help!"	The Beatles	
21 August	"Help!"	The Beatles	
28 August	"Help!"	The Beatles	
4 September	"Help!"	The Beatles	
11 September	"Help!"	The Beatles	
18 September	"(I Can't Get No) Satisfaction"	The Rolling Stones	
25 September	"(I Can't Get No) Satisfaction"	The Rolling Stones	
2 October	"(I Can't Get No) Satisfaction"	The Rolling Stones	
9 October	"(I Can't Get No) Satisfaction"	The Rolling Stones	
16 October	"(I Can't Get No) Satisfaction"	The Rolling Stones	
23 October	"This Strange Effect"	Dave Berry	
30 October	"This Strange Effect"	Dave Berry	
6 November	"This Strange Effect"	Dave Berry	
13 November	"Yesterday"	The Beatles	
20 November	"Yesterday"	The Beatles	
27 November	"Yesterday"	The Beatles	
4 December	"Yesterday"	The Beatles	
11 December	"Yesterday"	The Beatles	
18 December	"Yesterday"	The Beatles	
25 December	"We Can Work It Out" / "Day Tripper"	The Beatles	

== See also ==
- 1965 in music
