= List of Dutch Top 40 number-one singles of 1989 =

These hits topped the Dutch Top 40 in 1989.

Issue Date	Song	Artist(s)	Reference
7 January	"First Time"	Robin Beck	
14 January	"Can't Stay Away from You"	Gloria Estefan and Miami Sound Machine	
21 January	"Can't Stay Away from You"	Gloria Estefan and Miami Sound Machine	
28 January	"Tonight"	Tina Turner & David Bowie	
4 February	"Tonight"	Tina Turner & David Bowie	
11 February	"Tonight"	Tina Turner & David Bowie	
18 February	"Tonight"	Tina Turner & David Bowie	
25 February	"Buffalo Stance"	Neneh Cherry	
4 March	"Buffalo Stance"	Neneh Cherry	
11 March	"Belfast Child"	Simple Minds	
18 March	"Belfast Child"	Simple Minds	
25 March	"Alles kan een mens gelukkig maken"	René Froger	
1 April	"Alles kan een mens gelukkig maken"	René Froger	
8 April	"Alles kan een mens gelukkig maken"	René Froger	
15 April	"Eternal Flame"	The Bangles	
22 April	"Eternal Flame"	The Bangles	
29 April	"Eternal Flame"	The Bangles	
6 May	"Eternal Flame"	The Bangles	
13 May	"Eternal Flame"	The Bangles	
20 May	"Eternal Flame"	The Bangles	
27 May	"Eternal Flame"	The Bangles	
3 June	"Me, Myself and I"	De La Soul	
10 June	"Me, Myself and I"	De La Soul	
17 June	"No More Boleros"	Gerard Joling	
24 June	"No More Boleros"	Gerard Joling	
1 July	"No More Boleros"	Gerard Joling	
8 July	"No More Boleros"	Gerard Joling	
15 July	"No More Boleros"	Gerard Joling	
22 July	"No More Boleros"	Gerard Joling	
29 July	"Back to Life (However Do You Want Me)"	Soul II Soul	
5 August	"Back to Life (However Do You Want Me)"	Soul II Soul	
12 August	"We Are Growing (Shaka Zulu)"	Margaret Singana	
19 August	"We Are Growing (Shaka Zulu)"	Margaret Singana	
26 August	"We Are Growing (Shaka Zulu)"	Margaret Singana	
2 September	"We Are Growing (Shaka Zulu)"	Margaret Singana	
9 September	"Swing the Mood"	Jive Bunny and the Mastermixers	
16 September	"French Kiss"	Lil Louis	
23 September	"French Kiss"	Lil Louis	
30 September	"Lambada"	Kaoma	
7 October	"Lambada"	Kaoma	
14 October	"Lambada"	Kaoma	
21 October	"Girl I'm Gonna Miss You"	Milli Vanilli	
28 October	"Girl I'm Gonna Miss You"	Milli Vanilli	
4 November	"Girl I'm Gonna Miss You"	Milli Vanilli	
11 November	"Girl I'm Gonna Miss You"	Milli Vanilli	
18 November	"Girl I'm Gonna Miss You"	Milli Vanilli	
25 November	"Lily Was Here"	David A. Stewart and Candy Dulfer	
2 December	"Lily Was Here"	David A. Stewart and Candy Dulfer	
9 December	"Lily Was Here"	David A. Stewart and Candy Dulfer	
16 December	"Lily Was Here"	David A. Stewart and Candy Dulfer	
23 December	"Lily Was Here"	David A. Stewart and Candy Dulfer	
30 December	No Top 40 released		

== See also ==
- 1989 in music
