= List of Dutch Top 40 number-one singles of 1979 =

These hits topped the Dutch Top 40 in 1979.

Issue Date	Song	Artist(s)	Reference
6 January	"Paradise by the Dashboard Light"	Meat Loaf	
13 January	"Paradise by the Dashboard Light"	Meat Loaf	
20 January	"Y.M.C.A."	Village People	
27 January	"Y.M.C.A."	Village People	
3 February	"Y.M.C.A."	Village People	
10 February	"(You Gotta Walk) Don't Look Back"	Peter Tosh & Mick Jagger	
17 February	"(You Gotta Walk) Don't Look Back"	Peter Tosh & Mick Jagger	
24 February	"(You Gotta Walk) Don't Look Back"	Peter Tosh & Mick Jagger	
3 March	"Chiquitita"	ABBA	
10 March	"Fire"	The Pointer Sisters	
17 March	"Fire"	The Pointer Sisters	
24 March	"Fire"	The Pointer Sisters	
31 March	"Fire"	The Pointer Sisters	
7 April	"Lay Your Love on Me"	Racey	
14 April	"Lay Your Love on Me"	Racey	
21 April	"In the Navy"	Village People	
28 April	"Hooray! Hooray! It's a Holi-Holiday"	Boney M.	
5 May	"Hooray! Hooray! It's a Holi-Holiday"	Boney M.	
12 May	"Hooray! Hooray! It's a Holi-Holiday"	Boney M.	
19 May	"I Want You to Want Me"	Cheap Trick	
26 May	"I Want You to Want Me"	Cheap Trick	
2 June	"Bright Eyes"	Art Garfunkel	
9 June	"Bright Eyes"	Art Garfunkel	
16 June	"Bright Eyes"	Art Garfunkel	
23 June	"Bright Eyes"	Art Garfunkel	
30 June	"Bright Eyes"	Art Garfunkel	
7 July	"Reunited"	Peaches & Herb	
14 July	"(Theme from) The Deer Hunter"	The Shadows	
21 July	"(Theme from) The Deer Hunter"	The Shadows	
28 July	"(Theme from) The Deer Hunter"	The Shadows	
4 August	"I Was Made for Lovin' You"	Kiss	
11 August	"I Was Made for Lovin' You"	Kiss	
18 August	"I Was Made for Lovin' You"	Kiss	
25 August	"I Was Made for Lovin' You"	Kiss	
1 September	"Quiéreme Mucho"	Julio Iglesias	
8 September	"Quiéreme Mucho"	Julio Iglesias	
15 September	"Quiéreme Mucho"	Julio Iglesias	
22 September	"Quiéreme Mucho"	Julio Iglesias	
29 September	"Quiéreme Mucho"	Julio Iglesias	
6 October	"A Brand New Day"	The Wiz Stars featuring Diana Ross & Michael Jackson	
13 October	"A Brand New Day"	The Wiz Stars featuring Diana Ross & Michael Jackson	
20 October	"A Brand New Day"	The Wiz Stars featuring Diana Ross & Michael Jackson	
27 October	"A Brand New Day"	The Wiz Stars featuring Diana Ross & Michael Jackson	
3 November	"We Belong to the Night"	Ellen Foley	
10 November	"We Belong to the Night"	Ellen Foley	
17 November	"We Belong to the Night"	Ellen Foley	
24 November	"Crazy Little Thing Called Love"	Queen	
1 December	"Crazy Little Thing Called Love"	Queen	
8 December	"Crazy Little Thing Called Love"	Queen	
15 December	"Weekend"	Earth and Fire	
22 December	"Weekend"	Earth and Fire	
29 December	No Top 40 released		

== See also ==
- 1979 in music
