= List of Dutch Top 40 number-one singles of 1966 =

These hits topped the Dutch Top 40 in 1966.

Issue Date	Song	Artist(s)	Reference
1 January	"We Can Work It Out" / "Day Tripper"	The Beatles	
8 January	"We Can Work It Out" / "Day Tripper"	The Beatles	
15 January	"We Can Work It Out" / "Day Tripper"	The Beatles	
22 January	"We Can Work It Out" / "Day Tripper"	The Beatles	
29 January	"We Can Work It Out" / "Day Tripper"	The Beatles	
5 February	"We Can Work It Out" / "Day Tripper"	The Beatles	
12 February	"Michelle"	The Beatles / The Overlanders	
19 February	"Michelle"	The Beatles / The Overlanders	
26 February	"Michelle"	The Beatles / The Overlanders	
5 March	"Michelle"	The Beatles / The Overlanders	
12 March	"Michelle"	The Beatles / The Overlanders	
19 March	"These Boots Are Made for Walkin'"	Nancy Sinatra	
26 March	"These Boots Are Made for Walkin'"	Nancy Sinatra	
2 April	"These Boots Are Made for Walkin'"	Nancy Sinatra	
9 April	"These Boots Are Made for Walkin'"	Nancy Sinatra	
16 April	"These Boots Are Made for Walkin'"	Nancy Sinatra	
23 April	"Dedicated Follower of Fashion"	The Kinks	
30 April	"Dedicated Follower of Fashion"	The Kinks	
7 May	"Dedicated Follower of Fashion"	The Kinks	
14 May	"Sloop John B"	The Beach Boys	
21 May	"Sloop John B"	The Beach Boys	
28 May	"Sloop John B"	The Beach Boys	
4 June	"Sloop John B"	The Beach Boys	
11 June	"Paint It, Black"	The Rolling Stones	
18 June	"Paint It, Black"	The Rolling Stones	
25 June	"Paint It, Black"	The Rolling Stones	
2 July	"Paperback Writer"	The Beatles	
9 July	"Paperback Writer"	The Beatles	
16 July	"Sunny Afternoon"	The Kinks	
23 July	"Sunny Afternoon"	The Kinks	
30 July	"Sunny Afternoon"	The Kinks	
6 August	"Sunny Afternoon"	The Kinks	
13 August	"Dans je de hele nacht met mij?"	Karin Kent	
20 August	"With a Girl Like You"	The Troggs	
27 August	"Yellow Submarine" / "Eleanor Rigby"	The Beatles	
3 September	"Yellow Submarine" / "Eleanor Rigby"	The Beatles	
10 September	"Yellow Submarine" / "Eleanor Rigby"	The Beatles	
17 September	"Yellow Submarine" / "Eleanor Rigby"	The Beatles	
24 September	"Yellow Submarine" / "Eleanor Rigby"	The Beatles	
1 October	"Yellow Submarine" / "Eleanor Rigby"	The Beatles	
8 October	"Little Man"	Sonny & Cher	
15 October	"Little Man"	Sonny & Cher	
22 October	"Little Man"	Sonny & Cher	
29 October	"Little Man"	Sonny & Cher	
5 November	"Little Man"	Sonny & Cher	
12 November	"Little Man"	Sonny & Cher	
19 November	"No Milk Today"	Herman's Hermits	
26 November	"No Milk Today"	Herman's Hermits	
3 December	"No Milk Today"	Herman's Hermits	
10 December	"No Milk Today"	Herman's Hermits	
17 December	"No Milk Today"	Herman's Hermits	
24 December	"Friday on My Mind"	The Easybeats / The Dukes	
31 December	"Friday on My Mind"	The Easybeats / The Dukes	

== See also ==
- 1966 in music
