= List of Dutch Top 40 number-one singles of 1967 =

These hits topped the Dutch Top 40 in 1967.

Issue Date	Song	Artist(s)	Reference
7 January	"Green, Green Grass of Home"	Tom Jones	
14 January	"Green, Green Grass of Home"	Tom Jones	
21 January	"I'm a Believer"	The Monkees	
28 January	"I'm a Believer"	The Monkees	
4 February	"I'm a Believer"	The Monkees	
11 February	"Het Land van Maas en Waal"	Boudewijn de Groot	
18 February	"Het Land van Maas en Waal"	Boudewijn de Groot	
25 February	"Het Land van Maas en Waal"	Boudewijn de Groot	
4 March	"Penny Lane" / "Strawberry Fields Forever"	The Beatles	
11 March	"Penny Lane" / "Strawberry Fields Forever"	The Beatles	
18 March	"Penny Lane" / "Strawberry Fields Forever"	The Beatles	
25 March	"Penny Lane" / "Strawberry Fields Forever"	The Beatles	
1 April	"This Is My Song"	Petula Clark / Harry Secombe	
8 April	"This Is My Song"	Petula Clark / Harry Secombe	
15 April	"This Is My Song"	Petula Clark / Harry Secombe	
22 April	"This Is My Song"	Petula Clark / Harry Secombe	
29 April	"Puppet on a String"	Sandie Shaw	
6 May	"Puppet on a String"	Sandie Shaw	
13 May	"Puppet on a String"	Sandie Shaw	
20 May	"Ha! Ha! Said the Clown"	Manfred Mann	
27 May	"Ha! Ha! Said the Clown"	Manfred Mann	
3 June	"Ha! Ha! Said the Clown"	Manfred Mann	
10 June	"Waterloo Sunset"	The Kinks	
17 June	"A Whiter Shade of Pale"	Procol Harum	
24 June	"A Whiter Shade of Pale"	Procol Harum	
1 July	"A Whiter Shade of Pale"	Procol Harum	
8 July	"A Whiter Shade of Pale"	Procol Harum	
15 July	"A Whiter Shade of Pale"	Procol Harum	
22 July	"All You Need Is Love"	The Beatles	
29 July	"All You Need Is Love"	The Beatles	
5 August	"All You Need Is Love"	The Beatles	
12 August	"San Francisco (Be Sure to Wear Flowers in Your Hair)"	Scott McKenzie	
19 August	"San Francisco (Be Sure to Wear Flowers in Your Hair)"	Scott McKenzie	
26 August	"San Francisco (Be Sure to Wear Flowers in Your Hair)"	Scott McKenzie	
2 September	"San Francisco (Be Sure to Wear Flowers in Your Hair)"	Scott McKenzie	
9 September	"San Francisco (Be Sure to Wear Flowers in Your Hair)"	Scott McKenzie	
16 September	"San Francisco (Be Sure to Wear Flowers in Your Hair)"	Scott McKenzie	
23 September	"We Love You / Dandelion"	The Rolling Stones	
30 September	"We Love You / Dandelion"	The Rolling Stones	
7 October	"Grocer Jack (Excerpt from A Teenage Opera)"	Keith West	
14 October	"Grocer Jack (Excerpt from A Teenage Opera)"	Keith West	
21 October	"Massachusetts"	Bee Gees	
28 October	"Massachusetts"	Bee Gees	
4 November	"Massachusetts"	Bee Gees	
11 November	"Homburg"	Procol Harum	
18 November	"Homburg"	Procol Harum	
25 November	"Homburg"	Procol Harum	
2 December	"De Bostella"	Johnny Kraaykamp & Rijk de Gooyer	
9 December	"De Bostella"	Johnny Kraaykamp & Rijk de Gooyer	
16 December	"Hello, Goodbye"	The Beatles	
23 December	"Hello, Goodbye"	The Beatles	
30 December	"Hello, Goodbye"	The Beatles	

== See also ==
- 1967 in music
