= List of Dutch Top 40 number-one singles of 1964 =

These hits topped the Dutch Top 40 in 1964.

Issue Date	Song	Artist(s)	Reference
3 January	"If I Had a Hammer"	Trini Lopez	
10 January	"Pour Moi La Vie Va Commencer"	Johnny Hallyday	
17 January	"Pour Moi La Vie Va Commencer"	Johnny Hallyday	
24 January	"Pour Moi La Vie Va Commencer"	Johnny Hallyday	
31 January	"Pour Moi La Vie Va Commencer"	Johnny Hallyday	
7 February	"I Want To Hold Your Hand"	"The Beatles"	
14 February	"I Want To Hold Your Hand"	"The Beatles"	
21 February	"I Want To Hold Your Hand"	"The Beatles"	
28 February	"I Want To Hold Your Hand"	"The Beatles"	
7 March	"I Want To Hold Your Hand"	"The Beatles"	
14 March	"I Want To Hold Your Hand"	"The Beatles"	
21 March	"I Want To Hold Your Hand"	"The Beatles"	
28 March	"Vous permettez, Monsieur?"	"Salvatore Adamo"	
4 April	"Vous permettez, Monsieur?"	"Salvatore Adamo"	
11 April	"Vous permettez, Monsieur?"	"Salvatore Adamo"	
18 April	"Vous permettez, Monsieur?"	"Salvatore Adamo"	
25 April	"Vous permettez, Monsieur?"	"Salvatore Adamo"	
2 May	"Vous permettez, Monsieur?"	"Salvatore Adamo"	
9 May	"Vous permettez, Monsieur?"	"Salvatore Adamo"	
16 May	"Vous permettez, Monsieur?"	"Salvatore Adamo"	
23 May	"Vous permettez, Monsieur?"	"Salvatore Adamo"	
30 May	"Vous permettez, Monsieur?"	"Salvatore Adamo"	
6 June	"Vous permettez, Monsieur?"	"Salvatore Adamo"	
13 June	"De Winter Was Lang"	"Willeke Alberti"	
20 June	"Can't Buy Me Love"	"The Beatles"	
27 June	"Can't Buy Me Love"	"The Beatles"	
4 July	"Can't Buy Me Love"	"The Beatles"	
11 July	"Long Tall Sally"	"The Beatles"	
18 July	"Long Tall Sally"	"The Beatles"	
25 July	"Long Tall Sally"	"The Beatles"	
1 August	"A Hard Day's Night"	"The Beatles"	
8 August	"A Hard Day's Night"	"The Beatles"	
15 August	"A Hard Day's Night"	"The Beatles"	
22 August	"A Hard Day's Night"	"The Beatles"	
29 August	"A Hard Day's Night"	"The Beatles"	
5 September	"It's All Over Now"	"The Rolling Stones"	
12 September	"It's All Over Now"	"The Rolling Stones"	
19 September	"It's All Over Now"	"The Rolling Stones"	
26 September	"I Should Have Known Better"	"The Beatles"	
3 October	"I Should Have Known Better"	"The Beatles"	
10 October	"I Should Have Known Better"	"The Beatles"	
17 October	"Pretty Woman"	"Roy Orbison"	
24 October	"Pretty Woman"	"Roy Orbison"	
31 October	"Pretty Woman"	"Roy Orbison"	
7 November	"Pretty Woman"	"Roy Orbison"	
14 November	"Pretty Woman"	"Roy Orbison"	
21 November	"Pretty Woman"	"Roy Orbison"	
28 November	"Pretty Woman"	"Roy Orbison"	
5 December	"Pretty Woman"	"Roy Orbison"	
12 December	"Pretty Woman"	"Roy Orbison"	
19 December	"The French Song" ("Quand le soleil dit bonjour aux montagnes")	Lucille Starr	
26 December	"The French Song" ("Quand le soleil dit bonjour aux montagnes")	Lucille Starr	

== See also ==
- 1964 in music
