= List of Dutch Top 40 number-one singles of 1963 =

These hits topped the Dutch Top 40 in 1963.

Issue Date	Song	Artist(s)	Reference
2 January	"Paradiso"	Anneke Grönloh	
9 January	"Paradiso"	Anneke Grönloh	
16 January	"Paradiso"	Anneke Grönloh	
23 January	"Paradiso"	Anneke Grönloh	
30 January	"Paradiso"	Anneke Grönloh	
6 February	"Paradiso"	Anneke Grönloh	
13 February	"Paradiso"	Anneke Grönloh	
20 February	"Paradiso"	Anneke Grönloh	
27 February	"Paradiso"	Anneke Grönloh	
6 March	"Paradiso"	Anneke Grönloh	
13 March	"Paradiso"	Anneke Grönloh	
20 March	"The Next Time"	Cliff Richard	
27 March	"The Next Time"	Cliff Richard	
3 April	"The Next Time"	Cliff Richard	
10 April	"The Next Time"	Cliff Richard	
17 April	"Soerabaja"	Anneke Grönloh	
25 April	"Soerabaja"	Anneke Grönloh	
2 May	"Soerabaja"	Anneke Grönloh	
9 May	"Soerabaja"	Anneke Grönloh	
16 May	"Buona Notte"	Rocco Granata	
23 May	"Buona Notte"	Rocco Granata	
30 May	"Buona Notte"	Rocco Granata	
7 June	"Buona Notte"	Rocco Granata	
14 June	"Buona Notte"	Rocco Granata	
21 June	"Buona Notte"	Rocco Granata	
28 June	"Buona Notte"	Rocco Granata	
5 July	"Buona Notte"	Rocco Granata	
12 July	"Buona Notte"	Rocco Granata	
19 July	"Buona Notte"	Rocco Granata	
26 July	"Buona Notte"	Rocco Granata	
2 August	"Buona Notte"	Rocco Granata	
9 August	"Lucky Lips"	Cliff Richard	
16 August	"Lucky Lips"	Cliff Richard	
23 August	"Cimeroni"	Anneke Grönloh	
30 August	"Cimeroni"	Anneke Grönloh	
6 September	"Cimeroni"	Anneke Grönloh	
13 September	"Cimeroni"	Anneke Grönloh	
20 September	"Cimeroni"	Anneke Grönloh	
27 September	"Cimeroni"	Anneke Grönloh	
4 October	"Cimeroni"	Anneke Grönloh	
11 October	"(You're the) Devil in Disguise"	Elvis Presley	
18 October	"(You're the) Devil in Disguise"	Elvis Presley	
25 October	"(You're the) Devil in Disguise"	Elvis Presley	
1 November	"Tes tendres Annees"	Johnny Hallyday	
8 November	"Tes tendres Annees"	Johnny Hallyday	
15 November	"Tes tendres Annees"	Johnny Hallyday	
22 November	"If I Had a Hammer"	Trini Lopez	
29 November	"If I Had a Hammer"	Trini Lopez	
6 December	"If I Had a Hammer"	Trini Lopez	
13 December	"If I Had a Hammer"	Trini Lopez	
20 December	"If I Had a Hammer"	Trini Lopez	
27 December	"If I Had a Hammer"	Trini Lopez	

== See also ==
- 1963 in music
