= List of Dutch Top 40 number-one singles of 1975 =

These hits topped the Dutch Top 40 in 1975.

Issue Date	Song	Artist(s)	Reference
4 January	"Lonely This Christmas"	Mud	
11 January	"I Can Help"	Billy Swan	
18 January	"I Can Help"	Billy Swan	
25 January	"I Can Help"	Billy Swan	
1 February	"Voulez-vous coucher avec moi ce soir"	Labelle	
8 February	"Voulez-vous coucher avec moi ce soir"	Labelle	
15 February	"Voulez-vous coucher avec moi ce soir"	Labelle	
22 February	"Voulez-vous coucher avec moi ce soir"	Labelle	
1 March	"100 Years"	Joey Dyser	
8 March	"100 Years"	Joey Dyser	
15 March	"100 Years"	Joey Dyser	
22 March	"Shame, Shame, Shame"	Shirley & Company	
29 March	"Shame, Shame, Shame"	Shirley & Company	
5 April	"Hey mal yo"	Johnny & Orquesta Rodrigues	
12 April	"Hey mal yo"	Johnny & Orquesta Rodrigues	
19 April	"Paloma Blanca"	George Baker Selection	
26 April	"Paloma Blanca"	George Baker Selection	
3 May	"Paloma Blanca"	George Baker Selection	
10 May	"Love Is All"	Roger Glover & Guests	
17 May	"Love Is All"	Roger Glover & Guests	
24 May	"Love Is All"	Roger Glover & Guests	
31 May	"Swing Your Daddy"	Jim Gilstrap	
7 June	"Swing Your Daddy"	Jim Gilstrap	
14 June	"Girls"	Moments & Whatnauts	
21 June	"Girls"	Moments & Whatnauts	
28 June	"If You Go"	Barry & Eileen	
5 July	"If You Go"	Barry & Eileen	
12 July	"If You Go"	Barry & Eileen	
19 July	"Stand by Your Man"	Tammy Wynette	
26 July	"Stand by Your Man"	Tammy Wynette	
2 August	"The Elephant Song"	Kamahl	
9 August	"The Elephant Song"	Kamahl	
16 August	"The Elephant Song"	Kamahl	
23 August	"The Elephant Song"	Kamahl	
30 August	"The Elephant Song"	Kamahl	
6 September	"Sailing"	Rod Stewart	
13 September	"Sailing"	Rod Stewart	
20 September	"Sailing"	Rod Stewart	
27 September	"Sailing"	Rod Stewart	
4 October	"Guus"	Alexander Curly	
11 October	"Guus"	Alexander Curly	
18 October	"Guus"	Alexander Curly	
25 October	"Stan the Gunman"	Hank the Knife and the Jets	
1 November	"Morning Sky"	George Baker Selection	
8 November	"Morning Sky"	George Baker Selection	
15 November	"Dansez maintenant"	Dave	
22 November	"Dansez maintenant"	Dave	
29 November	"That's the Way (I Like It)"	KC and the Sunshine Band	
6 December	"That's the Way (I Like It)"	KC and the Sunshine Band	
13 December	"Mississippi"	Pussycat	
20 December	"Mississippi"	Pussycat	
27 December	"Mississippi"	Pussycat	

== See also ==
- 1975 in music
