= Roswinkel =

- Village
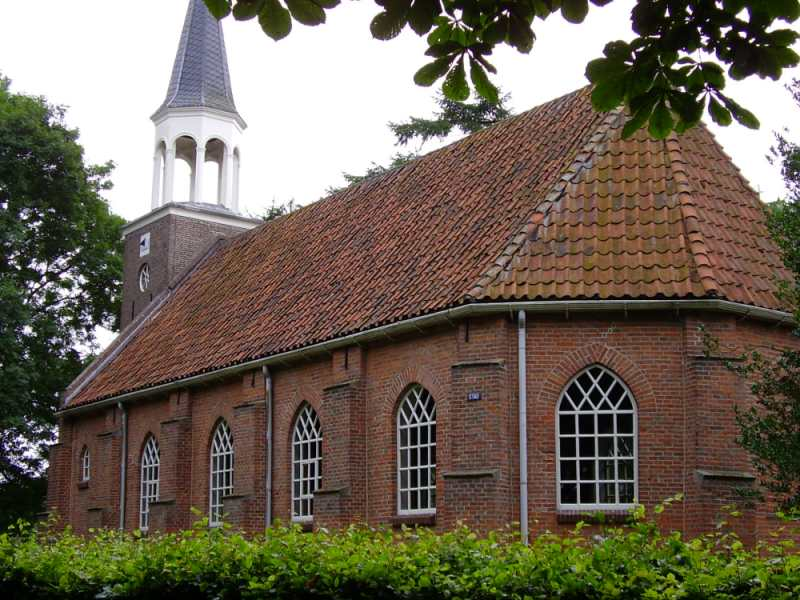
- The church of Roswinkel

- Location in province of Drenthe in the Netherlands Roswinkel (Netherlands)
- Coordinates: 52.8359°N 7.0369°E
- Country: Netherlands
- Province: Drenthe
- Municipality: Emmen

Area
  - Total: 20.42 km^{2} (7.88 sq mi)
- Elevation: 13 m (43 ft)

Population (2021)
  - Total: 820
  - Density: 40/km^{2} (100/sq mi)
- Postal code: 7895
- Dialing code: 0591

Roswinkel is a village in the Netherlands. It is part of the Emmen municipality in Drenthe, and is located close to the border with Germany.

== History ==
Roswinkel developed in the 13th century from Weerdinge. It was first mentioned in 1327 as "In marka de Werdighen juxta Roeswinkel", and the name means "enclosed land near reed". It already had a church. In the 15th century, it became a parish. The current church dates from 1759. In 1840, it was home to 561 people.
