= People's Choice (band) =

American funk band

- Origin: Philadelphia, Pennsylvania, United States
- Genres: Soul, funk, disco
- Years active: 1971–1985
- Labels: TSOP, Casablanca, Mercury
- Past members: 1971–1973; Frankie Brunson; David Thompson; Darnell Jordan; Johnnie Hightower; Stanley Thomas; Valerie Brown; Marc Reed; 1974–1983; Frankie Brunson; Dave Thompson; Guy Fiske; Roger Andrews; 1984–1985; Frank Brunson; Marc Reed; Clifton Gamble; David Thomson; Johnnie Hightower; Bill Rodgers

People's Choice was an American funk band formed in 1971 in Philadelphia by Frank Brunson and David Thompson. While they had several vocalists, their biggest hits were instrumentals.

== Career ==
People's Choice's debut single, "I Likes to Do It" on Phil-L.A. of Soul Records, got to #9 on the U.S. Billboard R&B chart and #38 on the Billboard Hot 100. A short time later Leon Huff saw People's Choice in concert, and told Frank Brunson that he wished the group had recorded "I Likes to Do It" for Philadelphia International Records. Huff (without Kenny Gamble on this occasion) signed the group in 1974, and it was with him that they had another hit single with "Do It Any Way You Wanna", later considered a Philly soul classic. The song sold over one million copies in three months, and was awarded a gold disc by the RIAA in November 1975. It was also used in Fred Williamson's 1976 film Death Journey.

Brunson died on November 24, 2007 after a long illness. Thompson died on June 3, 2025.

== Former members ==
- Frank Brunson - keyboards, vocals (died on November 24, 2007, at age 78).
- David Thomson - drums (April 6, 1945 - June 3, 2025)
- Guy Fiske - guitar
- Roger Andrews - bass
- Marc Reed - vocals
- Clifton Gamble - piano, synthesizer
- Johnnie Hightower - guitar
- Bill Rodgers - piano, synthesizer
- Darnell Jordan - guitar
- Stanley Thomas - bass, vocals
- Valerie Brown - vocals

== Discography ==
=== Studio albums ===
| Year | Title | Peak chart positions | | | Record label |
| Year | Title | US | US R&B | SWE | Record label |
|---|---|---|---|---|---|
| 1975 | Boogie Down U.S.A. | 56 | 7 | 45 | TSOP |
| 1976 | We Got the Rhythm | 174 | 38 | — | TSOP |
| 1978 | Turn Me Loose | — | — | — | Philadelphia International |
| 1980 | People's Choice | — | — | — | Casablanca |
| 1982 | Still in Love with You | — | — | — | TPC |
| 1984 | Strikin' | — | — | — | Mercury |
"—" denotes a recording that did not chart or was not released in that territory.

=== Compilation albums ===
- Golden Classics (1996, Collectables)
- I Likes to Do It (2000, Jamie)
- Any Way You Wanna - People's Choice Anthology 1971-1981 (2017, BBR)

=== Singles ===
| Year | Title | Peak chart positions | | | | | | |
| Year | Title | US | US R&B | US Dan | BEL | CAN | NLD | UK |
|---|---|---|---|---|---|---|---|---|
| 1971 | "I Likes to Do It" | 38 | 9 | — | — | — | — | — |
| 1972 | "The Wootie-T-Woo" | — | — | — | — | — | — | — |
| 1972 | "Magic" | — | — | — | — | — | — | — |
| 1973 | "Let Me Do My Thing" | — | 45 | — | — | — | — | — |
| 1974 | "Love Shop" | — | — | — | — | — | — | — |
| 1974 | "Party Is a Groovy Thing" | — | 45 | — | — | — | 14 | — |
| 1975 | "Do It Any Way You Wanna" | 11 | 1 | 3 | 6 | 34 | 2 | 36 |
| 1975 | "Nursery Rhymes (Part I)" | 93 | 22 | — | — | — | — | — |
| 1976 | "Here We Go Again" | — | 52 | 13 | — | — | — | — |
| 1976 | "Movin' in All Directions" | — | 52 | — | — | — | — | — |
| 1977 | "Cold Blooded & Down-Right-Funky" | — | 83 | — | — | — | — | — |
| 1977 | "If You Gonna Do It (Put Your Mind to It) (Part I)" | — | 76 | — | — | — | — | — |
| 1978 | "Jam, Jam, Jam (All Night Long)" | — | — | — | — | — | — | 40 |
| 1978 | "Turn Me Loose" | — | — | — | — | — | — | — |
| 1978 | "Rough-Ride" | — | — | — | — | — | — | — |
| 1980 | "My Feet Won't Move, But My Shoes Did the Boogie" | — | 77 | — | — | — | — | — |
| 1980 | "You Ought to Be Dancin'" | — | — | 8 | — | — | — | — |
| 1981 | "Hey Everybody (Party Hearty)" | — | — | 80 | — | — | — | — |
| 1982 | "Still in Love with You" | — | — | — | — | — | — | — |
| 1984 | "Can't Get Enough of Your Love" | — | — | — | — | — | — | — |
"—" denotes a recording that did not chart or was not released in that territory.
