= How Do You Do (Mouth & MacNeal song) =

Single by Mouth & MacNeal

from the album How Do You Do
- B-side: "Land of Milk and Honey"
- Released: November 1971
- Genre: Pop rock
- Length: 4:04 (Album Version); 2:57 (Single Edit)
- Label: Decca, Philips
- Songwriters: Hans van Hemert, Harry van Hoof

Mouth & MacNeal singles chronology
"How Do You Do" (1971)	"Hey, You Love" (1972)

"How Do You Do" released in 1971 was an international hit single for Dutch duo Mouth & MacNeal. It was No.1 in the Netherlands, Belgium, Denmark, Switzerland, and New Zealand. It also spent 19 weeks in the Billboard Hot 100 a year later, reaching No.8 and a cover version by Scots-German duo Die Windows (later Windows) reached No.1 in Germany. The single earned Mouth & MacNeal, and its composers Hans van Hemert and Harry van Hoof, the 1972 Buma Export Award for the most records sold abroad by a Dutch musical act in that year. "Land of Milk and Honey" charted in Canada for two weeks, reaching No.91, before the flip-side became the bigger hit.

In Australia, two versions reached the Top 40 simultaneously, the bigger hit being by Jigsaw.

== Charts and certifications ==
=== Weekly charts ===
Chart (1971–1972)	Peak position
Australia (Kent Music Report)	32
Belgium (VRT Top 30)	1
Canada (RPM)	2
Denmark (Tracklisten)	1
Germany (Media Control AG)	5
Netherlands (Dutch Top 40)	1
New Zealand (RIANZ)	1
Switzerland (Schweizer Hitparade)	1
U.S. Billboard Hot 100	8
U.S. Billboard Adult Contemporary	37

=== Year-end charts ===
Chart (1972)	Rank
Canada (unofficial)	32
U.S. Billboard Hot 100	25

=== Certifications ===
Region	Certification	Certified units/sales
United States (RIAA)	Gold	1,000,000^{^}
^{^} Shipments figures based on certification alone.

== See also ==
- Billboard Year-End Hot 100 singles of 1972
- Dutch Top 40 number-one hits of 1971
- Dutch Top 40 number-one hits of 1972
- List of number-one hits of 1972 (Switzerland)
- List of number-one singles in 1972 (New Zealand)
