= Pierre Kartner =

Dutch musician (1935–2022)

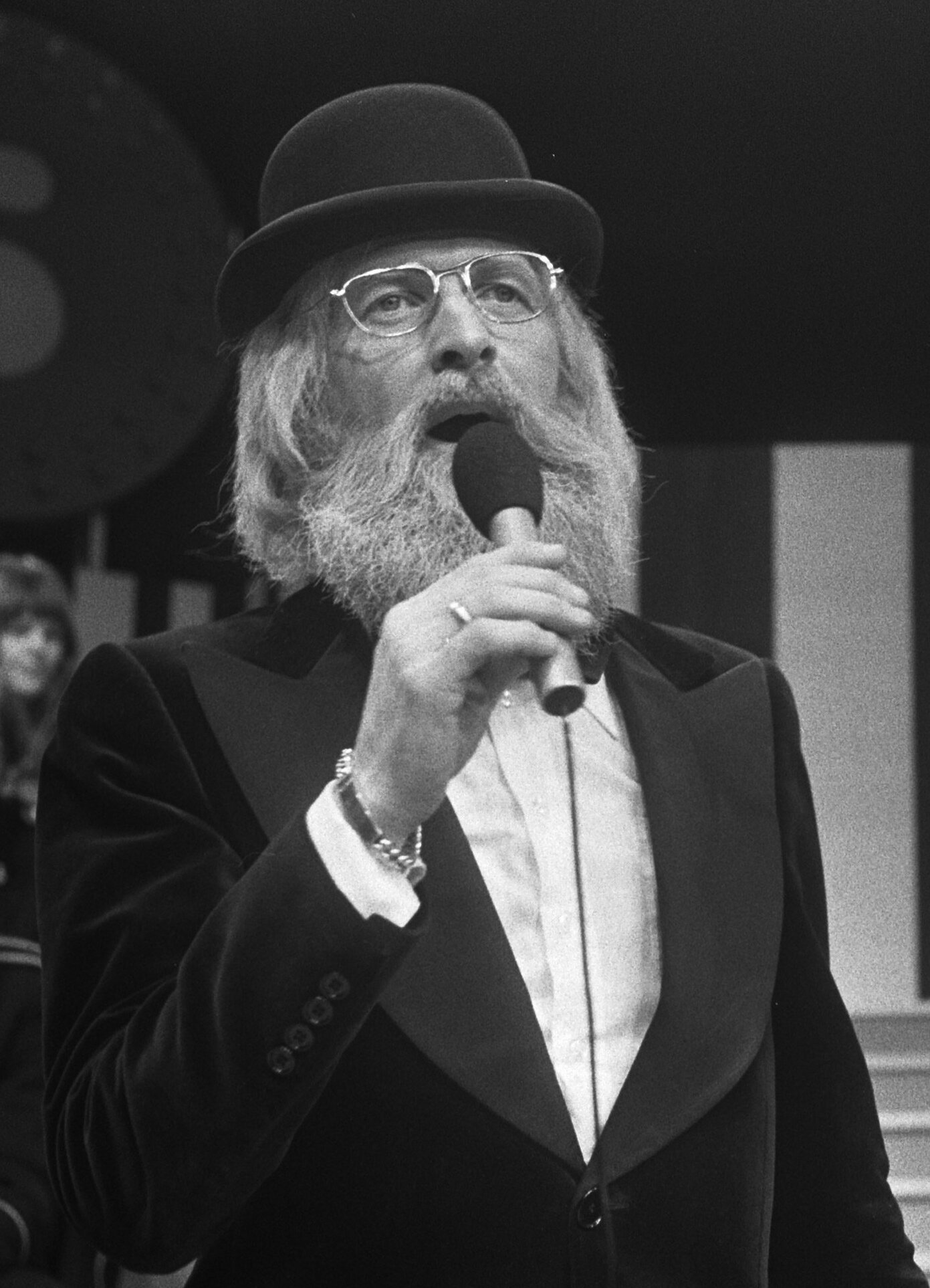
- Kartner performing in 1974

Background information
- Also known as: Father Abraham
- Born: Petrus Antonius Laurentius Kartner; 11 April 1935; Elst, Netherlands
- Died: 8 November 2022 (aged 87) Breda, Netherlands
- Genres: Levenslied, schlager
- Occupations: Musician, songwriter, composer, record producer
- Instrument: Vocals
- Years active: 1943–2020
- Label: Dureco
- Formerly of: Duo X; Corry & de Rekels
- Spouse: Annie
- Website: vader-abraham.com

Petrus Antonius Laurentius Kartner (11 April 1935 – 8 November 2022) was a Dutch musician, singer-songwriter and record producer who performed under the stage name Vader Abraham (Father Abraham). He wrote around 1600 songs.

== Early life and songwriting ==
Kartner was born on 11 April 1935. He started his singing career at the age of eight, winning a local festival. He lived with his family in Amsterdam and worked in a chocolate factory.

Kartner worked as a promoter and producer at a record label Dureco with Annie de Reuver, with whom he formed Duo X. He was a member of the band Corry & de Rekels, selling over one million records in the 1960s.

Kartner wrote the music for the opening and closing credits on the Japanese cartoon adaptation of the 1990 TV series Moomin and "Ik ben verliefd (Shalalie)", the Dutch entry for the 2010 Eurovision Song Contest.

== Father Abraham ==
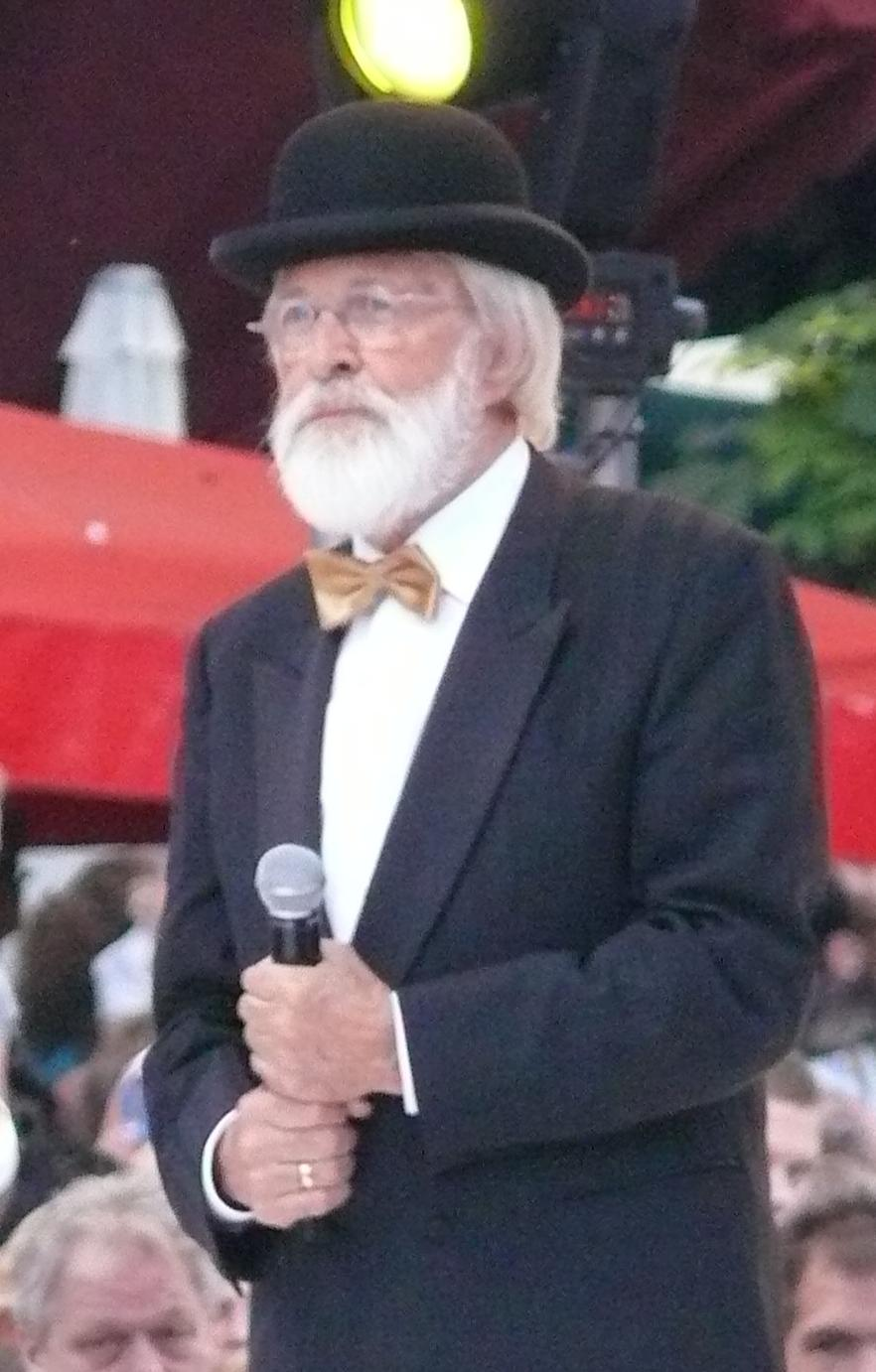
Kartner in 2007

In 1971, Kartner created his well-known alter ego, Father Abraham, after writing a Dutch carnival song, "Father Abraham had seven sons". Initially he wore a fake beard, but subsequently grew a real beard which, along with a bowler hat, became his trademark. Also in 1971, his duet with Wilma Landkroon, "Zou het erg zijn, lieve opa" (Would it be bad, dear grandfather?), reached number one in the Dutch pop music charts.

In 1981 Kartner recorded a song about Weepuls, "Wij zijn de wuppies" (We are the Weepuls).

=== The Little Café by the Harbour, 1975 ===
In 1975, Kartner scored his second biggest hit, "Het kleine café aan de haven" (The little café by the harbour). This song has since been covered over 250 times in various languages.
English cover versions include "The Little Cafe by the Harbour" by Engelbert Humperdinck, "My Favourite Cafe on the Harbour" by Audrey Landers and The Red Rose Café by Demis Roussos and, separately, The Fureys. Other cover versions of The Red Rose Café have been released by Peter Alexander (Austria), Joe Dassin (France), Mireille Mathieu (France), Celtic Thunder (Ireland), Audrey Landers (US), André Rieu (Netherlands), Jaromír Mayer (Czech Republic), Kantoři (Czech folk music), Dag Frøland (Norway 1981), and Hanne Krogh (Norway 1982).

In French the song was recorded as "Le café de la Rue d'Amérique" by Mireille Mathieu and "Le café des trois Colombes" by Joe Dassin, and in German as "Die kleine Kneipe" by Peter Alexander and "Das kleine Beisl". In the Norwegian language the song is called "Levende lys".

In Dutch it was rerecorded by André Rieu conducting the Maastricht Salon Orchestra.

=== The Smurfs, 1977–2005 ===
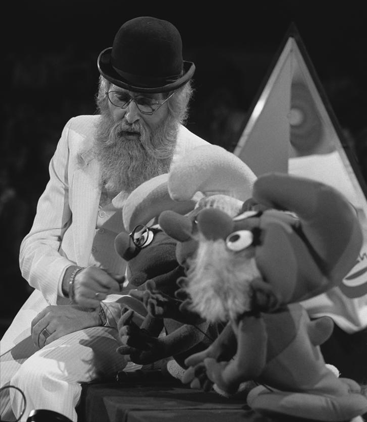
Kartner performing with Smurfs, 1983

In May 1977, Kartner was asked to make a promotional song about The Smurfs. The record company initially only pressed 1,000 copies of the single, called "The Smurf Song", since they were unsure about the single's potential. However, they were all sold within one day at a Schlager festival. After a repress, 400,000 singles were quickly sold. A full Smurfs album was then created, which sold 500,000 copies. The album was released in several dozen countries, including France, Germany, Italy, Japan, Spain, and Sweden, and in various different languages. The album scored a number one hit in 16 countries. Subsequently, Kartner released other Smurf-themed albums, again in various countries and languages, such as Ga je mee naar Smurfenland (Dutch) and Vater Abraham im Land der Schlümpfe (German). In all, Kartner's Smurf works have sold around 17 million copies.

In 2005 Vader Abraham recorded The Smurf Song together with the dance act Dynamite.

=== Political songs, 1973–2016 ===
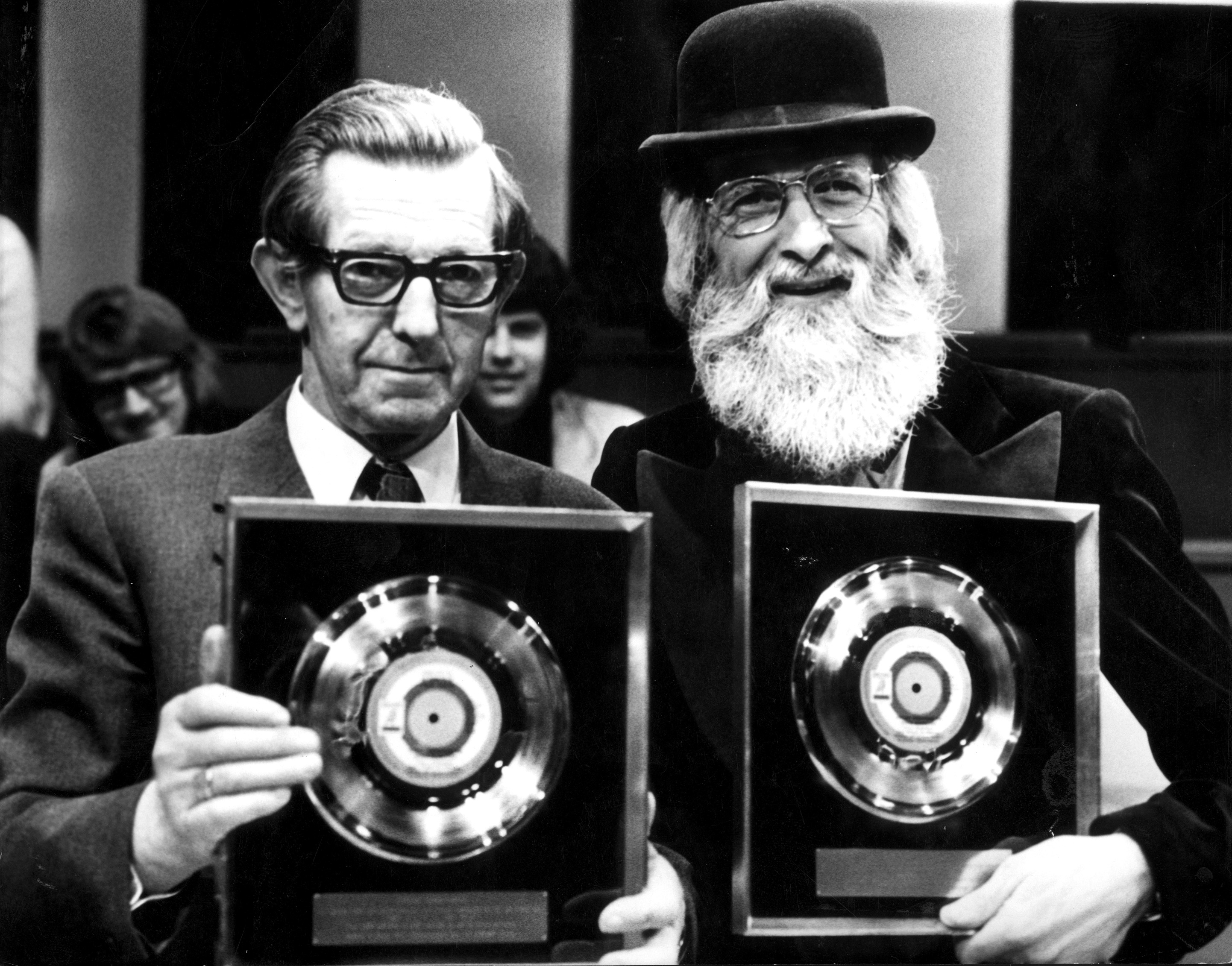
Kartner (right) and Hendrik Koekoek (left) accepting records for "Den Uyl is in den olie", 1974

As a reaction to the 1973 oil crisis, Kartner and the right-wing politician Hendrik Koekoek recorded the duet "Den Uyl is in den olie" (Den Uyl is in the oil), blaming the social democratic prime minister Joop den Uyl and Arabs for the crisis. In the carnival season of 1975, he published "Wat doen we met die Arabieren hier" (What do we do with the Arabs here?), containing the lines "What shall we do with the Arabs here? They can't be trusted with our pretty women here." The record company subsequently deleted the song. His 1976 song, "Het leger der werklozen" (The army of unemployed) portrays the jobless as people who spend the day sitting in pubs, drinking alcohol.

In 2002 Kartner recorded "Wimmetje gaat, Pimmetje komt" (Wim goes, Pim comes) with rising politician Pim Fortuyn, predicting that Fortuyn may replace Wim Kok as prime-minister. Before this could happen, Fortuyn was assassinated. In 2012, he recorded "Beste Koning" (Dear King) and in 2016 "Ik wil mijn gulden terug" (I want the guilder back).

== Honours and awards ==
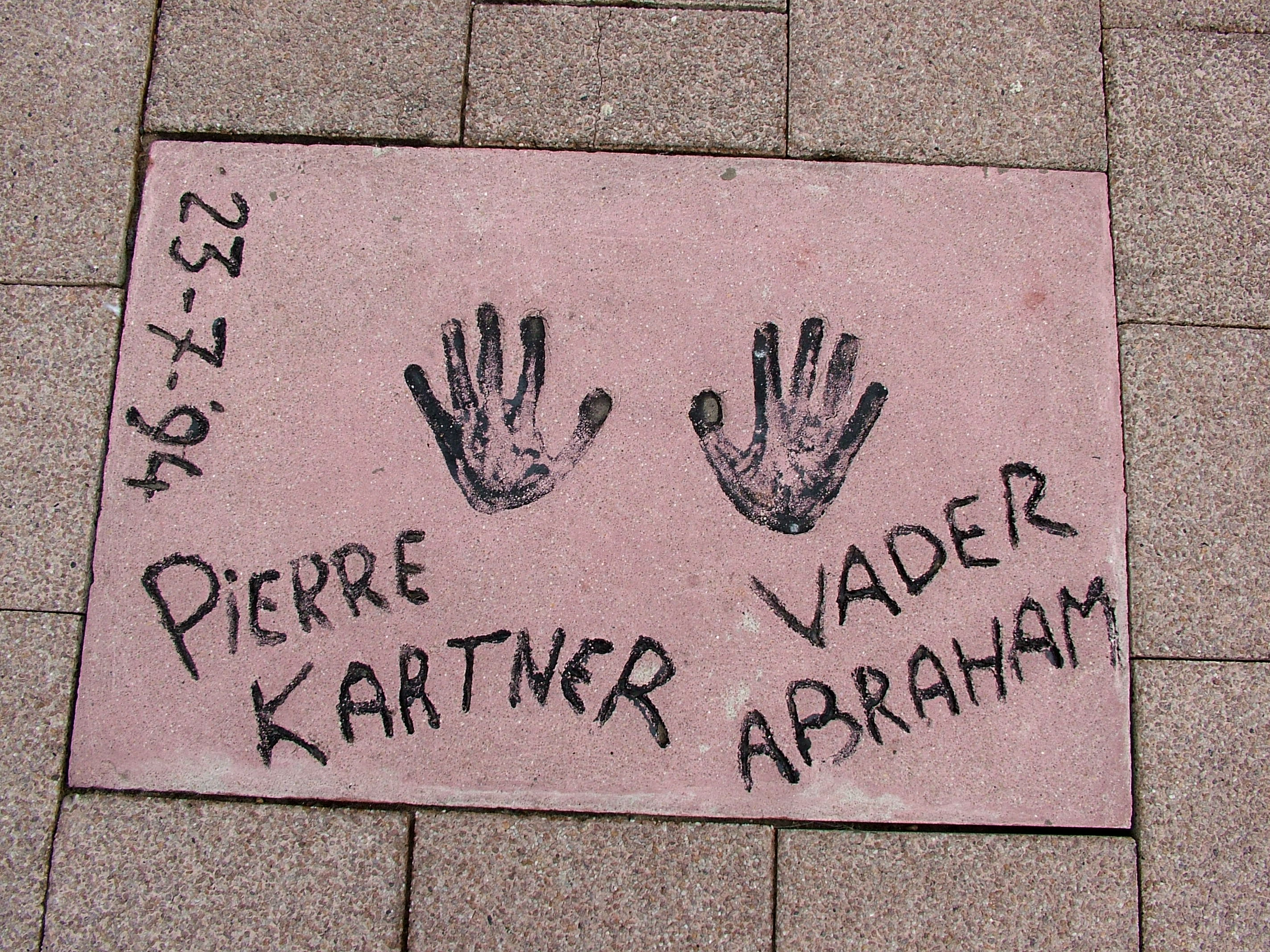
Kartner's handprints at the Rotterdam Walk of Fame

- Buma Export Award (1978)
- Buma Lifetime Achievement Award (2015)

== Personal life and death ==
Kartner lived in Breda with his wife Annie. They had a son, Walter.

Kartner died in Breda of bone cancer on 8 November 2022, at the age of 87.

== Discography ==
=== Studio albums ===
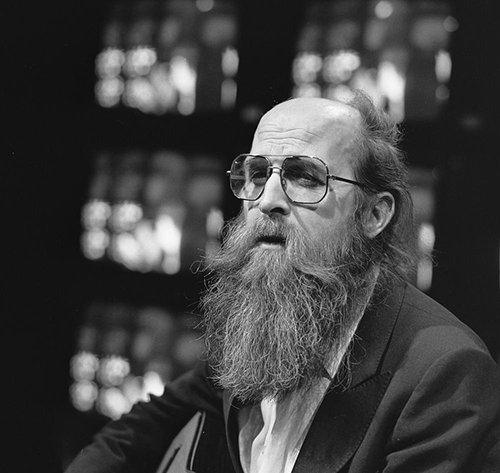
Kartner performing in 1980

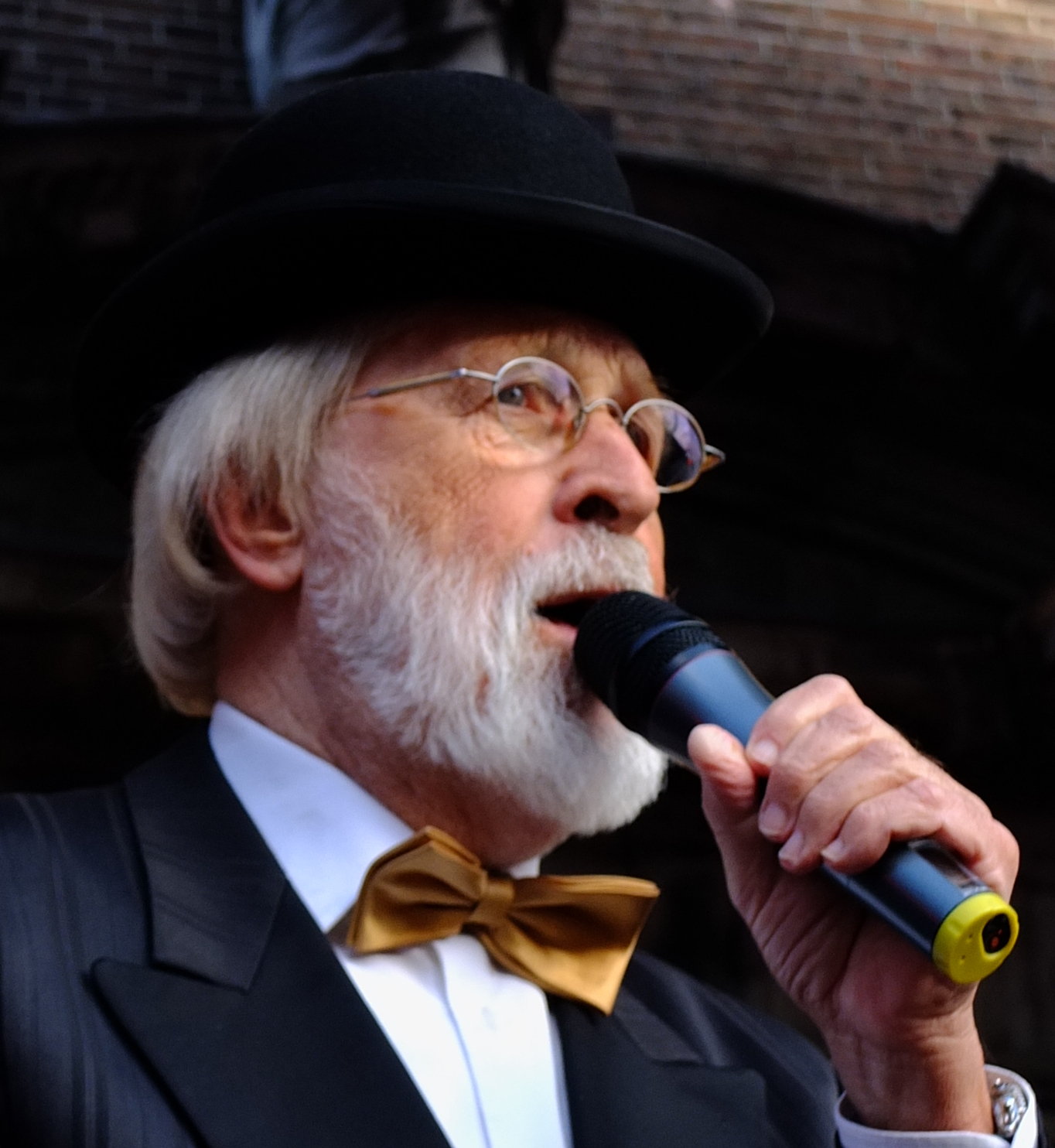
Kartner performing in 2015

- Een lach en een traan, 1972
- Vader Abraham Show, 1972, with others
- Veel liefs van... Vader Abraham en zijn goede zonen, 1972, with "zijn goede zonen"
- Vader Abraham en zijn goede zonen, 1973, with "zijn goede zonen"
- Samen jong, samen oud, 1974
  - Samen jong, samen oud Geven voor Leven, 1974
- Kerst show, 1974
- Mooi Griekenland, 1976
- Bedankt lieve ouders, 1976
- In Smurfenland, 1977, with the Smurfs
  - En el país de Los Pitufos, 1977
  - Au pays des Schtroumpfs, 1978
  - Im Land der Schlümpfe, 1978
  - In Smurfland, 1978
- Smurfenbier, 1978, with the Smurfs
  - El Padre Abraham y sus Pitufos, 1979
  - Smurfing Sing Song, 1979
  - Veo veo, 1980
  - Hitparade der Schlümpfe, 1980
- Kerstfeest, 1979
- Die glücklichen Jahre, 1979
  - De beste jaren van zijn leven, 1981
- Jij en ik blijven bestaan, 1981
- De wonderlijke Wuppie wereld, 1981, with the Wuppies
  - El Padre Abraham y los Wuppies, 1983
  - El maravilloso mundo de los Wuppies, 1983
  - Los Wuppies del Padre Abraham, 1983
  - Vader Abraham und die Wuppies, 1985
- Dierenmanieren, 1985
- Vader Abraham zingt over apen en andere mensen, 1987
- Als je wilt weten wie ik ben, 1987
- Vader Abraham 2, 1988
- Waarom huil je nou, 1988
- Together forever (Dutch), 1990, with the Smurfs
  - Together forever (English), 1990
  - Schlumpfenland Wunderland, 1990
- Die Lieder der Mumins, 1992
- Lach naar de wolken, 1994, as Pierre Kartner

=== Collections ===
- De beste van Vader Abraham, 1976
- De beste van Vader Abraham, 1977
- Bedankt Vader Abraham, 1979 (live)
- 14 Feestsuksessen, 1981
- 15 Jaar Karnaval, 1985
- Vader ziet Abraham, 1985
- 14 Beste, 1987
- De 20 best, 1988
- Het beste van Vader Abraham, 1990
- 15 Successen, 1990
- Op de deksel van de jampot, 1990
- Totaal, 1993
- 25 Jaar: Zijn 36 grootste successen, 1995
- 30 jaar Vader Abraham, 2000
- Gefeliciteerd Vader Abraham! – 80 jaar, 2015
