= The Blue Diamonds (duo) =

Indonesian and Dutch rock and roll duo

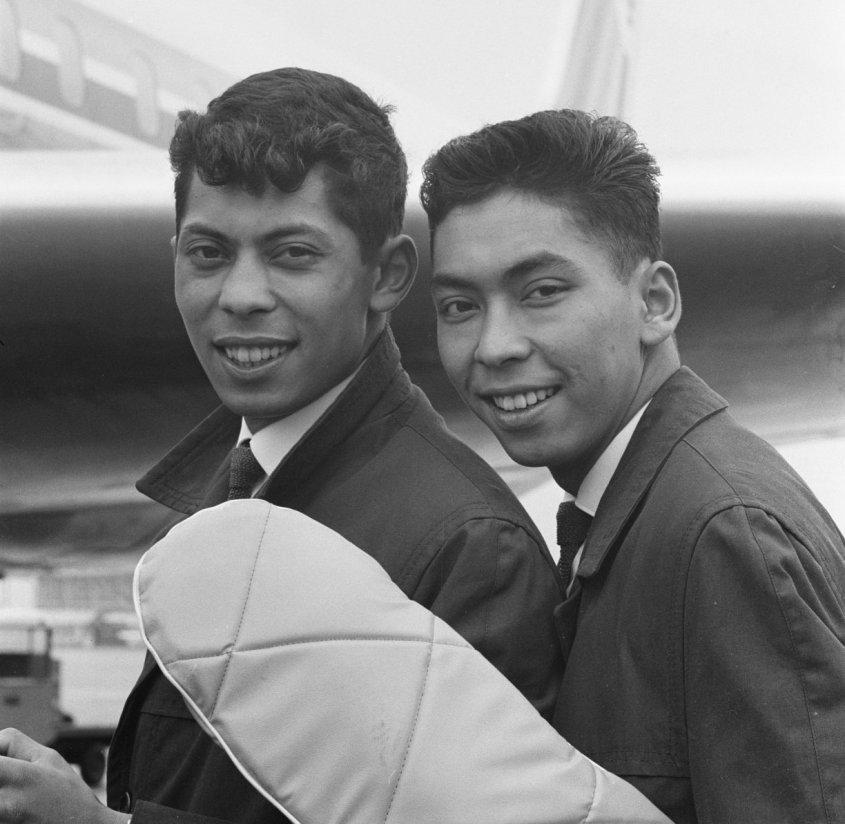
- Ruud and Riem de Wolff (The Blue Diamonds), August 1962.

Background information
- Origin: Maluku, Ambon Indonesia
- Genres: Rock and roll, Country
- Years active: 1959–2000
- Labels: Decca, Philips
- Past members: Ruud de Wolff; Riem de Wolff

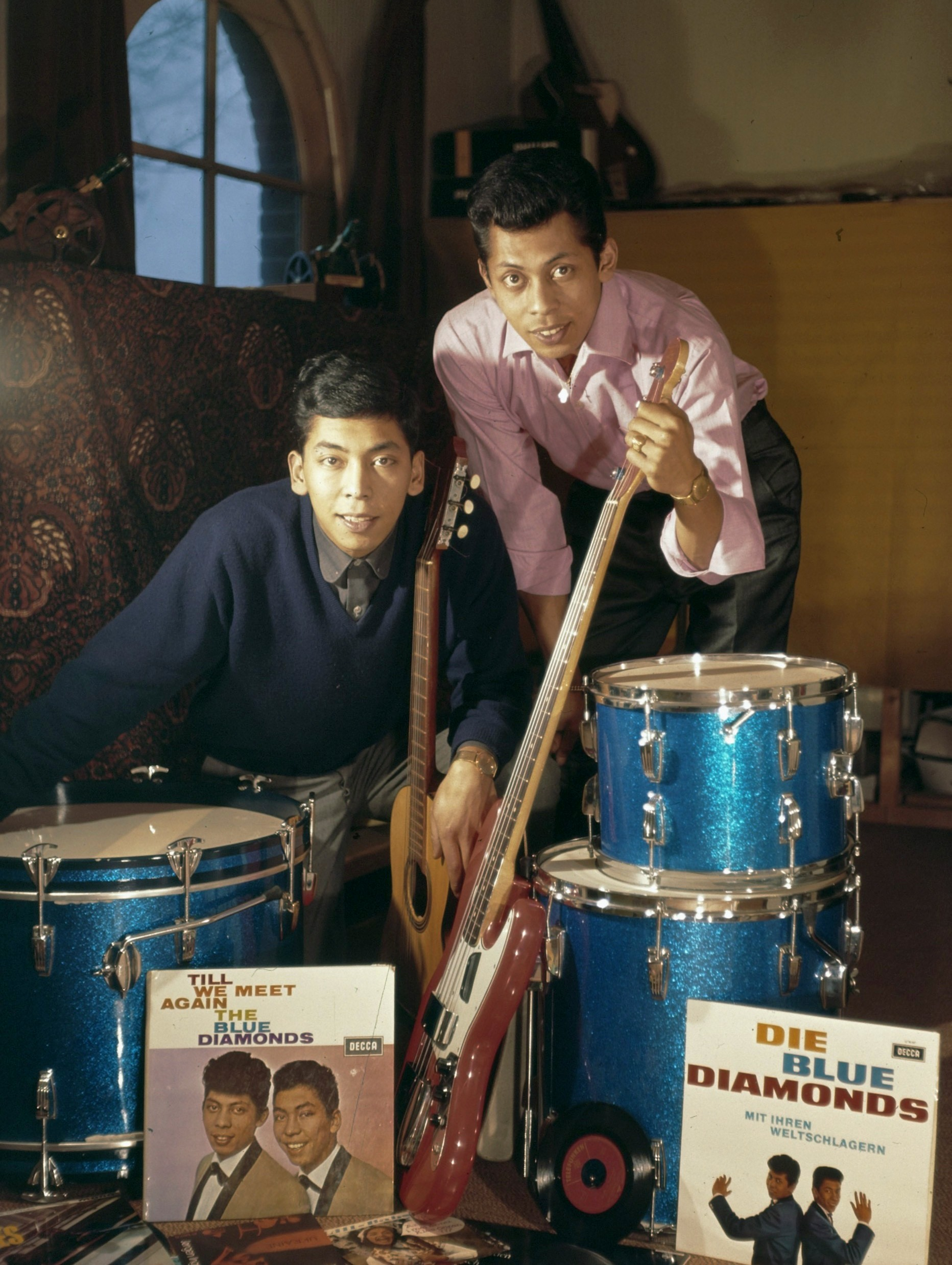
The Blue Diamonds in January 1964

The Blue Diamonds were an Indonesian and Dutch 1960s rock and roll duo, best known for their million-selling chart-topping single, "Ramona". Indo (Dutch-Indonesian) brothers Ruud de Wolff (12 May 1941 – 18 December 2000) and Riem de Wolff (15 April 1943 – 12 September 2017) founded the group shortly after immigrating to Driebergen-Rijsenburg in the Netherlands in 1949. They were born in Batavia (now Jakarta), Indonesia.

== Early career ==
Called the "Dutch – Indonesian Everly Brothers", the Blue Diamonds covered many Everly Brothers songs, but became famous in 1960 with their version of "Ramona", a song originally written for the 1928 film of the same name. The song was written for promotional appearances with Dolores del Río in the film, but not featured in the film itself. The Blue Diamonds' version also changed the original 3/4 time signature to 4/4. It reached the American Billboard Hot 100 at number 72 in 1960. It sold over 250,000 copies in the Netherlands (the first record to ever do so) and over one million copies in Germany by 1961.

== Later career ==
Although their last hit was in 1971, they continued to perform together up until Ruud de Wolff died from bladder cancer at the end of the year 2000. Riem de Wolff continued to perform and release albums until his death in 2017. At the time of his death, Riem had just been diagnosed with lung and liver cancer and had been suffering from the effects of a recent stroke.

A couple from Driebergen-Rijsenburg has taken the initiative to erect a statue to commemorate The Blue Diamonds. In mid-October 2025—65 years after Ramona became a global hit—the statue of the singing duo was unveiled at the Oranjevijver in their former hometown. The moment received national media attention.
