= The Collection (1993 Baccara album) =

The Collection (1993)

Compilation album by Baccara
- Released: 1993
- Recorded: 1977, 1978, 1979, 1981
- Genre: Pop; disco
- Label: BMG-Ariola
- Producer: Rolf Soja; Graham Sacher

Baccara chronology
| The Original Hits (1991) | The Collection (1993) (1993) | Yes Sir I Can Boogie (1994) |

Alternative cover
- 1998 re-issue

Professional ratings
Review scores
| Source | Rating |
|---|---|
| AllMusic | 4/5 stars |

The Collection is a compilation album by Spanish duo Baccara released on label BMG-Ariola in 1993. This compilation includes recordings by the original formation of the duo, Mayte Mateos and María Mendiola, taken from their RCA-Victor studio albums Baccara (1977), Light My Fire (1978), Colours (1979), Bad Boys (1981) and the greatest hits collection The Hits Of Baccara (1978). The Collection was re-issued in 1998 with alternative cover art.

== Track listing ==
1. "Sorry, I'm a Lady" (Dostal - Soja) - 3:39
2. "Heart, Body and Soul" (Sacher) - 4:11
3. "Spend The Night" (Sacher) - 3:09
4. "Cara Mia" (Docker) - 2:58
5. "Woman to Woman" (Sacher) - 3:30
6. "Yes Sir, I Can Boogie" (Dostal - Soja) - 4:35
7. "Boogaloo" (Sacher) - 2:40
8. "Colorado" (Sacher) - 3:33
9. "Darling" (7" version) (Dostal - Soja) - 5:26
10. "Ohio" (Sacher) - 3:05
11. "Parlez-Vous Français?" (English Version) (Dostal - Soja - Zentner) - 4:30
12. "Yummy, Yummy, Yummy" (Levine - Resnick) - 3:35
13. "Ay, Ay Sailor" (Dostal - Soja) - 3:50
14. "Baby, Why Don't You Reach Out?" / "Light My Fire" (Edited version) (Dostal - Soja) (Densmore - Krieger - Manzarek - Morrison) - 4:45
15. "Mucho, Mucho" (Sacher) - 3:26
16. "The Devil Sent You To Lorado" (Dostal - Soja) - 4:03
17. "My Kisses Need A Cavalier" (Dostal - Soja) - 4:52
18. "Body-Talk" (Dostal - Soja) - 4:38
19. "Bad Boys" (Sacher) - 4:23

== Personnel ==
- Mayte Mateos – vocals
- María Mendiola – vocals

== Production ==
- Produced and arranged by Rolf Soja.
- Tracks 2, 3, 5, 7, 8, 10, 15 & 19 arranged by Bruce Baxter, produced by Graham Sacher.

== Track annotations ==
- Tracks 1, 4 & 6 from 1977 studio album Baccara.
- Tracks 2, 3, 5, 7, 8, 10, 15 & 19 from 1981 studio album Bad Boys.
- Track 9 from 1978 7" single "Darling". Full-length version appears on album Light My Fire.
- Track 11 from 1978 7" single "Parlez-Vous Français? (English version)". Original French version appears on album Light My Fire.
- Tracks 12 & 17 from 1978 studio album Light My Fire.
- Tracks 13 & 18 from 1979 studio album Colours.
- Track 14 edited version taken from 1978 compilation The Hits Of Baccara. Full-length version appears on album Light My Fire.
- Track 16 from 1978 compilation The Hits Of Baccara.
