= The Best of Baccara – Original Hits =

The Best Of Baccara – Original Hits

Greatest hits album by Baccara
- Released: 2001
- Recorded: 1977, 1978, 1979, 1981
- Genre: Pop; disco
- Label: Paradiso; BMG-Ariola
- Producer: Rolf Soja; Graham Sacher

Baccara chronology
Woman to Woman (1999)	The Best Of Baccara – Original Hits (2001)	The Best of Baccara (2005)

Professional ratings
Review scores
Source	Rating
AllMusic	4/5 stars

The Best Of Baccara – Original Hits is a compilation album by Spanish duo Baccara issued by mid-price label Paradiso.

This compilation includes recordings by the original formation of the duo, Mayte Mateos and María Mendiola, taken from their RCA-Victor studio albums Baccara (1977), Light My Fire (1978), Colours (1979), Bad Boys (1981) and the greatest hits collection The Hits Of Baccara (1978), licensed from BMG-Ariola.

The track listing is identical to 1995's BMG-Ariola compilation Golden Stars.

== Track listing ==
1. "Yes Sir, I Can Boogie" (Dostal – Soja) – 4:35
2. "Sorry, I'm a Lady" (Dostal – Soja) – 3:39
3. "Darling" (7" Edit) (Dostal – Soja) – 5:26
4. "Parlez-Vous Français?" (Dostal – Soja – Zentner) – 4:30
5. "The Devil Sent You To Lorado" (Dostal – Soja) – 4:03
6. "Body-Talk" (Dostal – Soja) – 4:38
7. "Ay, Ay Sailor" (Dostal – Soja) – 3:50
8. "My Kisses Need A Cavalier" (Dostal – Soja) – 4:52
9. "Baby, Why Don't You Reach Out?" / "Light My Fire" (Edited version) (Dostal – Soja) (Densmore – Krieger – Manzarek – Morrison) – 4:45
10. "Yummy, Yummy, Yummy" (Levine – Resnick) – 3:35
11. "Bad Boys" (Sacher) 4:23
12. "Heart, Body and Soul" (Sacher) – 4:11
13. "Ohio" (Sacher) – 3:05
14. "Mucho, Mucho" (Sacher) – 3:26
15. "Woman to Woman" (Sacher) – 3:30
16. "Boogaloo" (Sacher) – 2:40
17. "Colorado" (Sacher) – 3:33
18. "Spend The Night" (Sacher) – 3:09

== Personnel ==
- Mayte Mateos – vocals
- María Mendiola – vocals

== Production ==
- Produced and arranged by Rolf Soja.
- Tracks 11 – 18 arranged by Bruce Baxter, produced by Graham Sacher.

== Track annotations ==
- Tracks 1 & 2 from 1977 studio album Baccara.
- Tracks 2, 3, 8 & 10 from 1978 studio album Light My Fire.
- Track 5 from 1978 compilation The Hits Of Baccara.
- Track 9 edited version taken from 1978 compilation The Hits Of Baccara. Full-length version appears on album Light My Fire.
- Tracks 6 & 7 from 1979 studio album Colours.
- Tracks 11 – 18 from 1981 studio album Bad Boys.
