= The Original Hits (Baccara album) =

Compilation album by Baccara
- Released: 1990
- Recorded: 1976–1978
- Genre: Pop; disco
- Label: BMG International
- Producer: Rolf Soja

Baccara chronology
Bad Boys (1981)	The Original Hits (1990)	Star Collection (1993)

Professional ratings
Review scores
Source	Rating
Allmusic	link

The Original Hits is a compilation album by Spanish duo Baccara released on label BMG International in 1990. The Original Hits was BMG-Ariola's first compact disc release of Baccara material and was in fact a re-issue of 1978 compilation The Hits Of Baccara (RCA PL 28344) provided with a new title and alternate artwork. The Hits Of Baccara having originally been issued in late 1978, this consequently means that The Original Hits omits recordings from the duo's third and fourth studio albums Colours (1979) and Bad Boys (1981) including single releases "Parlez-Vous Français?", "Body-Talk"/"By 1999", "Ay Ay Sailor", "Sleepy Time Toy" and "Colorado", thus creating a retrospective that only covers the first half of the original Baccara formation's recording career.

== Track listing ==
1. "The Devil Sent You To Lorado" (Dostal – Soja) – 4:07
2. "Koochie-Koo" (Dostal – Soja) – 4:04
3. "Adelita" (Traditional) – 2:31
4. "Sorry, I'm A Lady" (Dostal – Soja) – 3:39
5. "Cara Mia" (Docker – Soja) – 2:59
6. "Granada" (Lara) – 4:21
7. "Baby, Why Don't You Reach Out?" / "Light My Fire" (Edited version) (Soja – Dostal) / (Densmore – Krieger – Manzarek – Morrison) – 4:46
8. "Somewhere in Paradise" (Soja – Zentner) – 4:12
9. "La Bamba" (Traditional) – 3:04
10. "Darling" (7" version) (Dostal – Soja) – 5:28
11. "Yes Sir, I Can Boogie" Dostal, Soja – 4:33

== Personnel ==
- Mayte Mateos – vocals
- María Mendiola – vocals

== Production ==
- Produced and arranged by Rolf Soja.

== Track annotations ==
- Tracks 1 & 8 from 1978 compilation The Hits Of Baccara.
- Tracks 2, 4, 5, 6 & 11 from 1977 studio album Baccara.
- Tracks 3 & 9 from 1978 studio album Light My Fire.
- Track 9 edited version taken from 1978 compilation The Hits Of Baccara. Full-length version appears on album Light My Fire.
- Track 10 from 1978 7" single "Darling". Full-length version appears on album Light My Fire.
