= Evolution (Baccara album) =

Studio album by Baccara
- Released: 28 November 2025
- Recorded: 2022–2025
- Studio: Studio 33 Mallorca
- Genres: Dance-pop; Eurodance
- Length: 50:46
- Languages: English; Spanish
- Label: Team 33 Music
- Producer: Luis Rodríguez

Baccara chronology
I Belong to Your Heart (2017)	Evolution (2025)

Singles from Evolution
- 1. "Don't Let This Feeling Go Away" Released: 9 September 2022; 2. "When I'm With You" Released: 24 November 2023; 3. "Vamos Al Cielo" Released: 26 April 2024; 4. "The Power Of Love" Released: 14 February 2025; 5. "Qatar My Love (Jean Paul D. feat. Baccara)" Released: 20 June 2025; 6. "Forever" Released: 24 October 2025

Evolution is a studio album by the Spanish pop duo Baccara, and the first full-length release recorded by the lineup consisting of Cristina Sevilla and Helen de Quiroga. The album was officially released on 28 November 2025 through Team 33 Music, and became available both on digital streaming platforms and as a physical CD. Distribution of the CD edition was handled by ZYX Music.

== Background ==
The first ideas for the album began to take shape in the spring of 2022, when Sevilla and de Quiroga met in the studio to record early vocal sessions. During this period they completed "Don't Let This Feeling Go Away", which became the duo's first single, released on 9 September 2022.

In early 2023, In-OUT Records announced a special extended vinyl edition of the single, made available on 29 May and later added to streaming platforms on 28 July. The second single, "When I'm with You", followed on 24 November and was later confirmed for inclusion on the album.

The third single, "Vamos Al Cielo", arrived on 26 April 2024. Its extended vinyl version was released on 17 August, with the digital extended mix appearing on 18 October. The vinyl also featured an extended version of "When I'm with You" on the B-side, which became available for streaming upon the release of Evolution. The album additionally includes an extended Spanish-language version of "Vamos Al Cielo", offering a new interpretation of the track.

In 2025 the duo continued their series of releases with three new singles: "The Power of Love" on 14 February, "Qatar My Love", a collaboration with Qatari musician Jean Paul D., on 20 June, and "Forever" on 24 October. Alongside these previously released tracks, the album features several new songs, including "Baila Baila", "My Love in China", "Corazón", and "Lovetown", showcasing a variety of upbeat and melodic styles.

Evolution also pays tribute to María Mendiola, co-founder and original member of Baccara. The album includes "No Sir, Don't Say Goodbye", the last song recorded by Mendiola, first released on 30 July 2021. Cristina Sevilla additionally contributed "My Friend in Heaven", written in Mendiola's memory, adding a personal and heartfelt touch to the album.

At the beginning of January 2026, In-OUT Records announced that the album would also be released on vinyl. The red vinyl edition was released on April 12 and included all of the album's tracks, with the exception of the extended versions of "Vamos al Cielo" and "When I'm with You".

== Extended versions ==
"Evolution (Extended Versions)" was released on August 7, 2026. The album is a compilation of extended versions of selected tracks from the original Evolution album. Comprising eight tracks, it includes previously released maxi-single versions alongside several newly produced extended mixes. The release was preceded by the premiere of the extended version of "Forever (Extended Version)" on July 31, 2026, which debuted on the official Team 33 Music YouTube channel.

== Track listing ==
Evolution track listing
No.	Title	Writer(s)	Length
1.	"Vamos Al Cielo"	Luis Rodríguez; Philippe Escaño	3:15
2.	"Don't Let This Feeling Go Away"	Rodríguez; Escaño	2:54
3.	"Baila Baila"	Rodríguez; Escaño	2:33
4.	"My Love In China"	Rodríguez; Escaño; Raúl Olivares Garrido	3:39
5.	"Forever"	Rodríguez; Escaño	3:06
6.	"Corazón"	Rodríguez; Rafael Artesero Herrero; José Juan Santana Rodríguez	3:06
7.	"Qatar My Love" (Jean Paul D. featuring Baccara)	Paul Davidenko; Sebastian Inselmann	2:35
8.	"When I'm With You"	Rodríguez; Escaño	3:02
9.	"Lovetown"	Hans Christian Meiser	3:32
10.	"The Power Of Love"	Rodríguez; Escaño	3:24
11.	"No Sir, Don't Say Goodbye" (María Mendiola & Cristina Sevilla)	Rodríguez; Escaño	2:39
12.	"My Friend In Heaven"	Rodríguez; Escaño; Olivares Garrido; Cristina Sevilla	3:50
13.	"Vamos Al Cielo" (Spanish Extended Version)	Rodríguez; Escaño; Sevilla	7:16
14.	"When I'm with You" (Extended)	Rodríguez; Escaño	5:54
Total length:			50:46

Extended versions
No.	Title	Writer(s)	Length
1.	"Vamos Al Cielo"	Rodríguez; Escaño	7:16
2.	"Don't Let This Feeling Go Away"	Rodríguez; Escaño	6:00
3.	"My Love In China"	Rodríguez; Escaño; Olivares Garrido	5:36
4.	"Forever"	Rodríguez; Escaño	5:27
5.	"When I'm With You"	Rodríguez; Escaño	5:54
6.	"The Power Of Love"	Rodríguez; Escaño	6:33
7.	"No Sir, Don't Say Goodbye" (María Mendiola & Cristina Sevilla)	Rodríguez; Escaño	6:31
8.	"Vamos Al Cielo" (Spanish Extended Version)	Rodríguez; Escaño; Sevilla	7:16
Total length:			50:36

== Personnel ==
=== Musicians ===
- Cristina Sevilla – vocals
- Helen de Quiroga – vocals
- María Mendiola – vocals (track 11)

=== Production ===
- Luis Rodríguez – producer
- Philippe Escaño – co-producer
- Bernd Voss – guitar (track 10)
- Raúl Olivares – Additional programming (track 4)
- Andrei Quint – Additional programming (track 6)

== Release history ==
Release history for Evolution
Country	Date	Format(s)	Label	Ref.
Various	28 November 2025	Digital	Team 33 Music	
Various	28 November 2025	CD	Team 33 Music	
Various	12 April 2026	LP	Team 33 Music	
