= Parlez-vous français? (Baccara song) =

1978 song by Baccara

Single by Baccara

from the album Light My Fire
- Language: French
- B-side: "Amoureux"
- Released: 21 April 1978
- Label: RCA Records
- Composer: Rolf Soja
- Lyricists: Frank Dostal; Peter Zentner

Eurovision Song Contest 1978 entry
- Country: Luxembourg
- Artists: Mayte Mateos; María Mendiola
- As: Baccara
- Language: French
- Composer: Rolf Soja
- Lyricists: Frank Dostal; Peter Zentner
- Conductor: Rolf Soja

Finals performance
- Final result: 7th
- Final points: 73

Entry chronology
- ◄ "Frère Jacques" (1977)
- "J'ai déjà vu ça dans tes yeux" (1979) ►

"Parlez-vous français?" (French pronunciation: [paʁle vu fʁɑ̃sɛ]; "Do you speak French?") is a 1978 song recorded by Spanish disco duo Baccara, consisting of Mayte Mateos and María Mendiola, with music composed by Rolf Soja and lyrics written by Frank Dostal and Peter Zentner. It represented Luxembourg in the Eurovision Song Contest 1978, held in Paris.

== Background ==
=== Conception ===
"Parlez-vous français ?" was composed by Rolf Soja with lyrics by Frank Dostal and Peter Zentner, the same team that composed and produced Baccara's breakthrough single "Yes Sir, I Can Boogie" and the follow-ups "Sorry, I'm a Lady", and "Darling".

The song is an up-tempo disco duet, with the singers describing the importance of speaking French – described as "the language of love and summer". One of them at least has recently been on holiday and required a working knowledge of that language in order to have a holiday romance.

The French-language version of "Parlez-vous français?" was included on Baccara's second studio album Light My Fire and an English version –with the same title– was also released as a single in certain markets.

=== Eurovision ===
On 21 March 1978, "Parlez-vous français ?" performed by Baccara competed in the national final that the Compagnie Luxembourgeoise de Télédiffusion (CLT) organized to select its song and performer for the 23rd edition of the Eurovision Song Contest. The song won the competition so it became the Luxembourgian entry –and Baccara the performers– for Eurovision.

On 22 April 1978, the Eurovision Song Contest was held at the Palais des Congrès in Paris hosted by Télévision Française 1 (TF1) and broadcast live throughout the continent. Baccara performed "Parlez-vous français ?" in French seventeenth on the evening, following Denmark's "Boom Boom" by Mabel and preceding Israel's "A-Ba-Ni-Bi" by Izhar Cohen and Alphabeta. Rolf Soja conducted the event's live orchestra in the performance of the Luxembourgian entry.

At the close of voting, the song had received 73 points, placing seventh in a field of twenty. It was succeeded as Luxembourgian entry at the 1979 contest by "J'ai déjà vu ça dans tes yeux" by Jeane Manson.

=== Aftermath ===
Despite its moderate success in the contest, "Parlez-vous français?" proved to be one of the year's best-selling entries, reaching #8 in Sweden, #18 in Austria, #21 in West Germany and #30 on the Dutch singles charts. However, when the duo released their first 'greatest hits' album in late 1978, The Hits of Baccara, the song was surprisingly omitted.

Composers Rolf Soja and Frank Dostal returned to the contest in 1986 when they co-wrote Luxembourg's entry "L'Amour de ma vie", performed by Canadian singer Sherisse Laurence.

In the Eurovision fiftieth anniversary competition Congratulations: 50 Years of the Eurovision Song Contest, held on 22 October 2005 in Copenhagen, Dana International performed the song as part of the interval acts.

== Chart performance ==
=== Weekly charts ===
Chart (1978)	Peak position
Austria (Ö3 Austria Top 40)	18
Belgium (Ultratop 50 Flanders)	7
Finland (Suomen virallinen lista)	3
Netherlands (Dutch Top 40 Tipparade)	4
Netherlands (Single Top 100)	30
Sweden (Sverigetopplistan)	8
West Germany (Official German Charts)	21
