= The Original Hits =

The Original Hits or Original Hits may refer to:

- The Original Hits (Baccara album), 1990 compilation album by Baccara
- The Original Hits, 1989 compilation album by Sylvester (singer)
- Original Hits, 2012 compilation album by Pitbull

== See also ==
- Basic: Original Hits, 1995 compilation album by Helen Reddy
- Runaway – The Original Hits, 1996 album by Del Shannon
- The Best of Baccara – Original Hits, 2001 compilation album by Baccara
- Elvis Gold 50 Original Hits, 2011 compilation album by Elvis Presley
