= Helen de Quiroga =

Spanish singer and actress (born 1964)

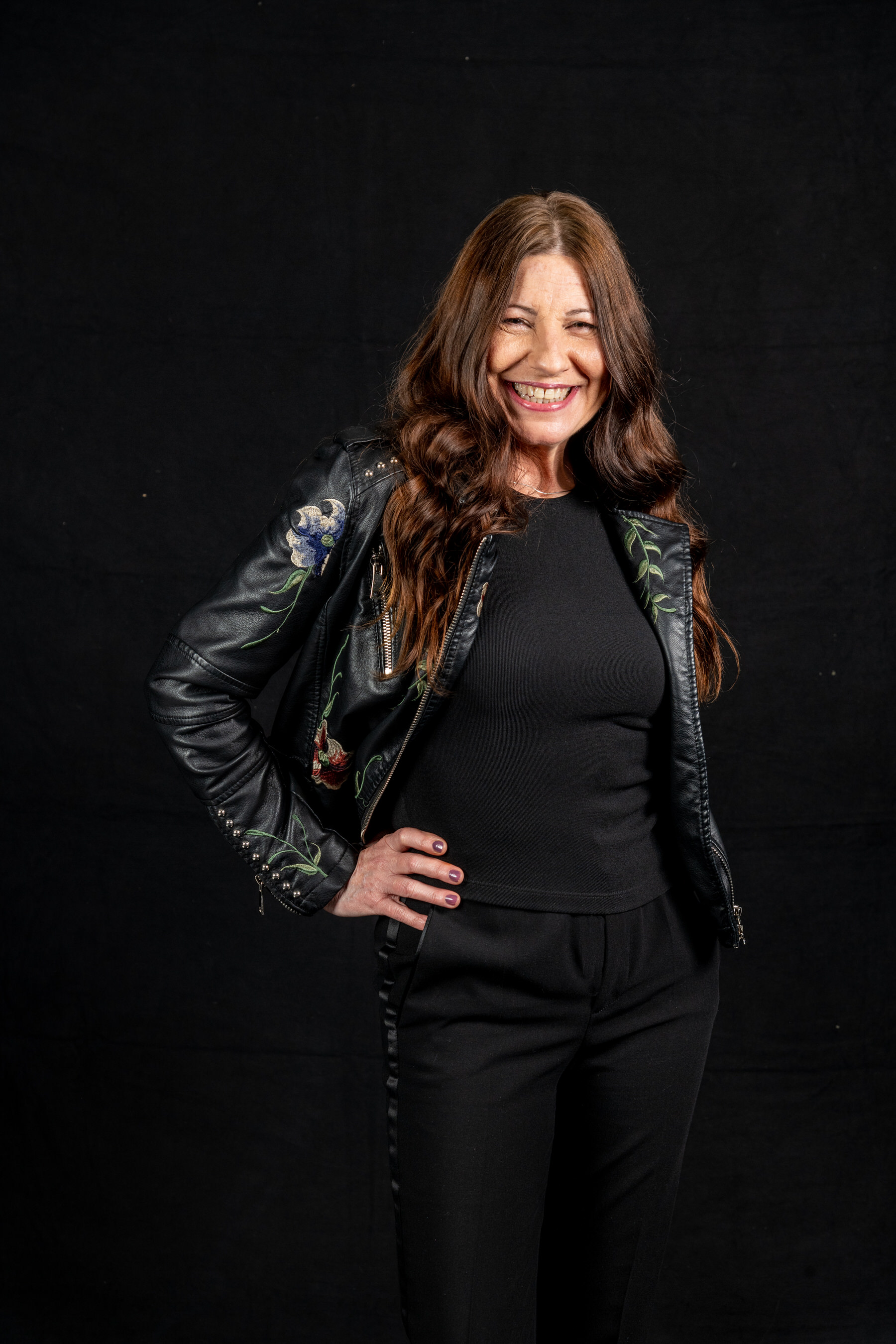
- Helen de Quiroga in 2022

Background information
- Born: Helena de Quiroga González; December 14, 1964 (age 61); Málaga, Andalusia, Francoist Spain
- Occupation: Singer
- Labels: WEA Latina; Team 33 Music
- Member of: Baccara
- Website: baccara-oficial.com

Helena de Quiroga González (born December 14, 1964), known professionally as Helen de Quiroga, is a Spanish vocalist, studio backing singer, voice actress and musical theatre performer. She is known for her long-standing collaborations with prominent artists on the Spanish music scene, her work in dubbing productions, and her activity in musical theatre.

== Early life and music career ==
Helen de Quiroga was born in Málaga, in the Andalusia region. From an early age she showed a strong interest in music and the performing arts, which led her to attend the Escuela Superior de Arte Dramático in Málaga. She received training in drama, stage interpretation and vocal technique, and this education later became the foundation of her career in music and theatre. In 1987, she won the New Talents contest organized by the morning show Por la mañana, presented and directed by Jesús Hermida. As a prize, she became the main singer of the show’s orchestra for many months.

She began her professional work as a supporting singer and studio backing vocalist. Over the years she collaborated with numerous artists across a wide range of musical genres. Her voice can be heard on recordings and in concert projects by Miguel Bosé, Mecano, Alejandro Sanz, La Unión, Duncan Dhu and Luis Eduardo Aute. She also recorded the single "Con las ganas de decirte" with Miguel Bosé, which appeared on his 2012 album Papitwo, released by Warner Music Spain. Her work included both studio sessions and participation in major concert tours, where she performed backing parts as well as occasional solo features. Together with Pedro Andrea, Jacob Sureda, Billy Villegas and Vicente Climent, she formed the band DVersion Quartet, with which she released an album in 2017.

== Dubbing and theatre work ==
Alongside her singing career, de Quiroga expanded into dubbing and contributed to several Spanish-language releases of animated films. In the 1990s she took part in the Spanish redub of La Sirenita (The Little Mermaid), performing Ursula’s vocals in "Pobres almas en desgracia" (original: "Poor Unfortunate Souls"), where she was credited specifically for the singing parts. She also voiced the Muse Thalia in Hércules (Hercules) and performed Zira’s songs in the Spanish version of El Rey León 2 (The Lion King II), including "Mi cantar" (original: "My Lullaby").

Her experience in studio recording opened the door to musical theatre. In 2003 de Quiroga was cast in one of the leading roles in the Madrid production of Cats. She portrayed Grizabella, whose signature number "Memory" is considered one of the most technically demanding songs in musical theatre. Her interpretation was well received and helped strengthen her reputation as both a singer and a stage actress.

== Baccara ==
In 2022, Helen de Quiroga joined Baccara, performing alongside Cristina Sevilla. This collaboration marked a new chapter for the group, which continues the legacy of María Mendiola while developing new stage and studio projects. De Quiroga made her debut with Baccara at a concert in Kyiv and subsequently performed at numerous music events and festivals, including Madrid Pride, fashion shows in Seville, the Guilfest festival in the UK, as well as concerts in Estonia and the United States.

The group’s repertoire features both classic Baccara hits and new material. Together with de Quiroga, the group released a series of new singles, including "Don’t Let This Feeling Go Away","When I’m With You", and "Vamos Al Cielo". In 2025 their studio album Evolution was released, blending Baccara’s signature style with modern production elements.
