= Star Collection =

Star Collection may refer to:

- Star Collection (Iron Butterfly album), 1973
- Star Collection (Baccara album), 1991
