= El C.I.D. =

British television comedy drama series (1990–1992)

- Series 3 Title Card
- Genre: Crime drama Comedy
- Created by: Chris Kelly; Iain Roy
- Starring: Alfred Molina; John Bird; Simón Andreu; Tony Haygarth; Donald Churchill; María Isbert; Kenneth Cranham; Amanda Redman; Cristina Sevilla
- Theme music composer: Mike Moran
- Country of origin: United Kingdom
- Original language: English
- No. of series: 3
- No. of episodes: 19

Production
- Executive producers: Sally Head; David Plowright
- Producer: Matthew Bird
- Cinematography: Michael B. Poppley; David Head
- Running time: 60 minutes
- Production company: Granada Television

Original release
- Network: ITV
- Release: 7 February 1990 – 2 March 1992

El C.I.D. is an ITV television crime drama comedy that ran for three seasons from 7 February 1990 until 2 March 1992. The series starred Alfred Molina as Bernard Blake, a C.I.D. officer who takes early retirement and moves to Spain where he and his work partner, Douglas Bromley (John Bird), a retired records officer, keep an eye on the expat community of British gangsters. As well as settling into life on the Costa del Sol, the storyline featured the pair helping out a local private eye, Delgado (Simón Andreu) to investigate cases.

The series was highly publicised following criticism of Spain's extradition treaty with the UK, which was featured heavily in the newspapers during the series' run. Before the third series, Molina left the cast, and was subsequently replaced by Amanda Redman, who joined the series as the daughter of Bird's character, Bromley. The series also co-starred Kenneth Cranham as a notorious British gangster who fled to Spain. Scriptwriter Jimmy McGovern wrote episodes for both the first and second series. The title is a play on El Cid, the 11th-century Castilian knight and warlord in medieval Spain.

== Cast ==
- Alfred Molina as Bernard Blake
- John Bird as Douglas Bromley
- Simón Andreu as Delgado
- Tony Haygarth as Frank
- Donald Churchill as Metcalf
- María Isbert as Senora Sanchez
- Kenneth Cranham as Gus Mercer
- Amanda Redman as Rosie Bromley
- Niven Boyd as Graham
- Viviane Vives as Mercedes
- Fiona Gillies as Linda
- Paul Brooke as James Henley Dodd

== Episodes ==
=== Series overview ===
Series	Episodes	Originally released	
Series	Episodes	First released	Last released
1	6	7 February 1990	14 March 1990
2	7	1 January 1991	12 February 1991
3	6	27 January 1992	2 March 1992

=== Series 1 (1990) ===
No.	Title	Directed by	Written by	Original release date
1	"Copping Out"	Tom Clegg	Chris Kelly & Iain Roy	7 February 1990
Douglas Bromley, attending a training course in Spain, entertains thoughts of quitting the Met and starting a new life on the Costa del Sol. Back in London, his friend and colleague, Bernard Blake, sees the appeal.
2	"Spanish Eyes"	Tom Clegg	Chris Kelly & Iain Roy	14 February 1990
Douglas and Bernard arrive in Spain, having quit policing the streets of London for a beach bar on the Costa del Sol. However, there is someone in Spain who remembers them from London - and he's determined to put them out of business.
3	"Dog Days"	Brian Parker	Terry Hodgkinson	21 February 1990
When 'ex-pat' Dinny returns to London for a few days, he enlists Graham to mind his Villa with the strict instruction that no-one is allowed in. When Dinny's wife finds out he is away, she arrives in Spain to claim the villa which is in her name. To do that she must have the villa officially declared vacant, but it's guarded by Graham and three vicious dogs. Blake is called in to find a way past the dogs.
4	"The Price of Love"	Robert Gabriel	Paul W.S. Anderson	28 February 1990
When a woman he has never met before kisses him in the street, Blake is bemused. As he stands watching her as she walks away, two men bundle her into a car and drive away. Blake contacts the Spanish police who seem reluctant to investigate, so Blake sets out to find the mysterious woman.
5	"A Proper Copper"	Tim Sullivan	Jimmy McGovern	7 March 1990
Bromley is depressed and irritable, that can only mean one thing: it's his birthday, his 56th. Blake offers to take him out to cheer him up, so they spend the night at the casino. Whilst there Bromley overpowers an armed man, the intended targets are two British drug dealers. The man blames them for the death of his son. Bromley promises to bring the men to justice.
6	"Getting Even"	Robert Tronson	Paul W.S. Anderson	14 March 1990
Mercer and Graham have returned from South Africa and they need a favour. They are trying to do a deal to buy some diamonds from a recent robbery in, London. They are £50,000 short, so put pressure on Frank to raise the money. Seeing this as a chance to get rid of Mercer and Graham for good, Frank enlists the help of Bromley and Blake. Meanwhile, at the marina, Blake investigates a series of thefts, thefts which Metcalf has accused Senora Sanchez of being involved in.

=== Series 2 (1991) ===
No.	Title	Directed by	Written by	Original release date
1	"Christmas Spirit"	Richard Spence	Jimmy McGovern	1 January 1991
Blake investigates when a thief, apparently under the possession of special powers, disrupts Christmas preparations.
2	"Piece of Cake"	Richard Spence	Jimmy McGovern	8 January 1991
Blake comes across an old criminal, and investigates a case of food poisoning at Frank's restaurant.
3	"In the Rough"	Baz Taylor	Alan Clews	15 January 1991
Bromley and Blake investigate an attack on a golf course.
4	"Paradise Mislaid"	Lawrence Gordon Clark	Paul W.S. Anderson	22 January 1991
Blake is surprised by the arrival of his half-brother, and investigates when a retired couple are conned.
5	"Thursday's Child"	Baz Taylor	Bill Gallagher	29 January 1991
Blake agrees to help find a missing girl, and gets caught up in the case of a stolen racehorse.
6	"All Grown Up and Nowhere to Go"	Lawrence Gordon Clark	Bill Gallagher	5 February 1991
Bromley and Blake's work on a case is threatened when they realise their cover could be blown by a face from the past.
7	"Ticket to Ride"	Tom Clegg	Rod Beecham	12 February 1991
Bromley and Blake decide to try their luck on a local lottery.

=== Series 3 (1992) ===
No.	Title	Directed by	Written by	Original release date
1	"Making Amends"	William Brayne	Paul W.S. Anderson	27 January 1992
Douglas's daughter Rosie flies out to join him in Spain. Frank has problems with his new pizza delivery service.
2	"Nothing is Forever"	Lawrence Gordon Clark	Rod Beecham	3 February 1992
Gus is accused of stealing a diamond necklace, and Douglas tries to prove his innocence.
3	"My Brother's Keeper"	Lawrence Gordon Clark	Joe Ainsworth	10 February 1992
Douglas and Rosie are hired to act as minders to a young English footballer.
4	"Who Needs Enemies?"	Lawrence Gordon Clark	Brian Finch	17 February 1992
Douglas investigates reports of a poltergeist.
5	"Day of the Gato"	Tim Sullivan	Joe Ainsworth	24 February 1992
Douglas investigates a series of church burglaries.
6	"The Lone Stranger"	Lawrence Gordon Clark	Alan Whiting	2 March 1992
Douglas suspects Mercer of murder, and gets some welcome attention from Stephanie.
