= Jeane Manson =

American actress, singer (born 1950)

- Born: Jean Ann Manson; October 1, 1950 (age 75); Cleveland, Ohio, U.S.
- Occupations: Model, singer, actor
- Spouse: Robert Viharo (m. 1981, divorced)
- Website: jeanemanson.com

Jeane Manson (born Jean Ann Manson on October 1, 1950) is an American model, singer, and actor, born in Cleveland, Ohio. Her first name was changed from "Jean" to "Jeane" because, as all of her career was in France after 1974, the French would have otherwise thought that she was a man, "Jean" being the French for "John".

After being photographed for Playboy magazine's Playmate of the Month in August 1974, she moved to France and appeared in several films, including Bons Baisers de Hong Kong (1975). The following year, she became known for the song "Avant de nous dire adieu". In 1979 she represented Luxembourg in the Eurovision Song Contest with the song "J'ai déjà vu ça dans tes yeux".

== Discography ==
=== Singles ===
- Avant de nous dire adieu (1976)
- Une femme (1976)
- La chapelle de Harlem (1977)
- Ce n'est qu'un au revoir (1977)
- Un enfant est né (1977)
- No volveré (1977)
- Fais-moi danser (1978)
- J'ai déjà vu ça dans tes yeux (1979)
- Fly to New York city (1979)
- Vis ta vie (1979)
- Tu es venu (1980)
- L'étoile d'amour (1980)
- Amitié et amour (with Kenny Loggins) (1981)
- Comme un bateau ivre (1981)
- Et j'en ouble de pleurer (1981)
- Aimer c'est mourir un peu (1982)
- Need you (1982)
- Love moi dans tes bras (1983)
- Besoin d'un homme (1983)
- Lucie et Daniel (1985)
- Je suis perdue (1985)
- Ne dis rien (1986)
- Hymne à la vie (1987)
- Te buscaré (1988)
- L'amour prison (1989)
- Those were the days (1990)
- Guantanamera (1992)
- The world should be ours (1993)
- C'et toi que j'aime (1996)
- Rester ou partir (1996)
- Yobel n'ayons pas peur (1997)
- Partir avec toi (1998)

=== Albums (not compilations) ===
- Jeane Manson (1977)
- Lovingly (1977)
- Fly to New York City (1979)
- Stand by me (1980)
- Jeane Manson canta en Español (1980)
- Jeane Manson (1981)
- La belle histoire de Shirley Violette (1981)
- Aux USA (1982)
- Mes photos couleur (1983)
- Ange ou démon (1985)
- Song d'une nuit (1988)
- Jeane Manson y el Mariachi Mezcal (1992)
- Je n'aime que toi (1992)
- Dédicace - Concert at Salle Gaveau (1995)
- Country Girl (1996)
- Un nouveau monde (1998)
- Jeane Manson chante les plus grands airs classiques (1999)
- Gospel (2001)
- Amour caché (2004)
- Viviré (in french) (2014)
- Viviré (in spanish) (2014)
- Amour le seul soleil du coeur (2016)
- Latina sensacion (2020)

Preceded by Baccara with "Parlez-vous français?"	Luxembourg in the Eurovision Song Contest; 1979	Succeeded by Sophie & Magaly with "Papa Pingouin"

Nancy Cameron	Francine Parks	Pamela Zinszer	Marlene Morrow	Marilyn Lange	Sandy Johnson
Carol Vitale	Jean Manson	Kristine Hanson	Ester Cordet	Bebe Buell	Janice Raymond
