= Mayte Mateos =

Spanish singer (born 1951)

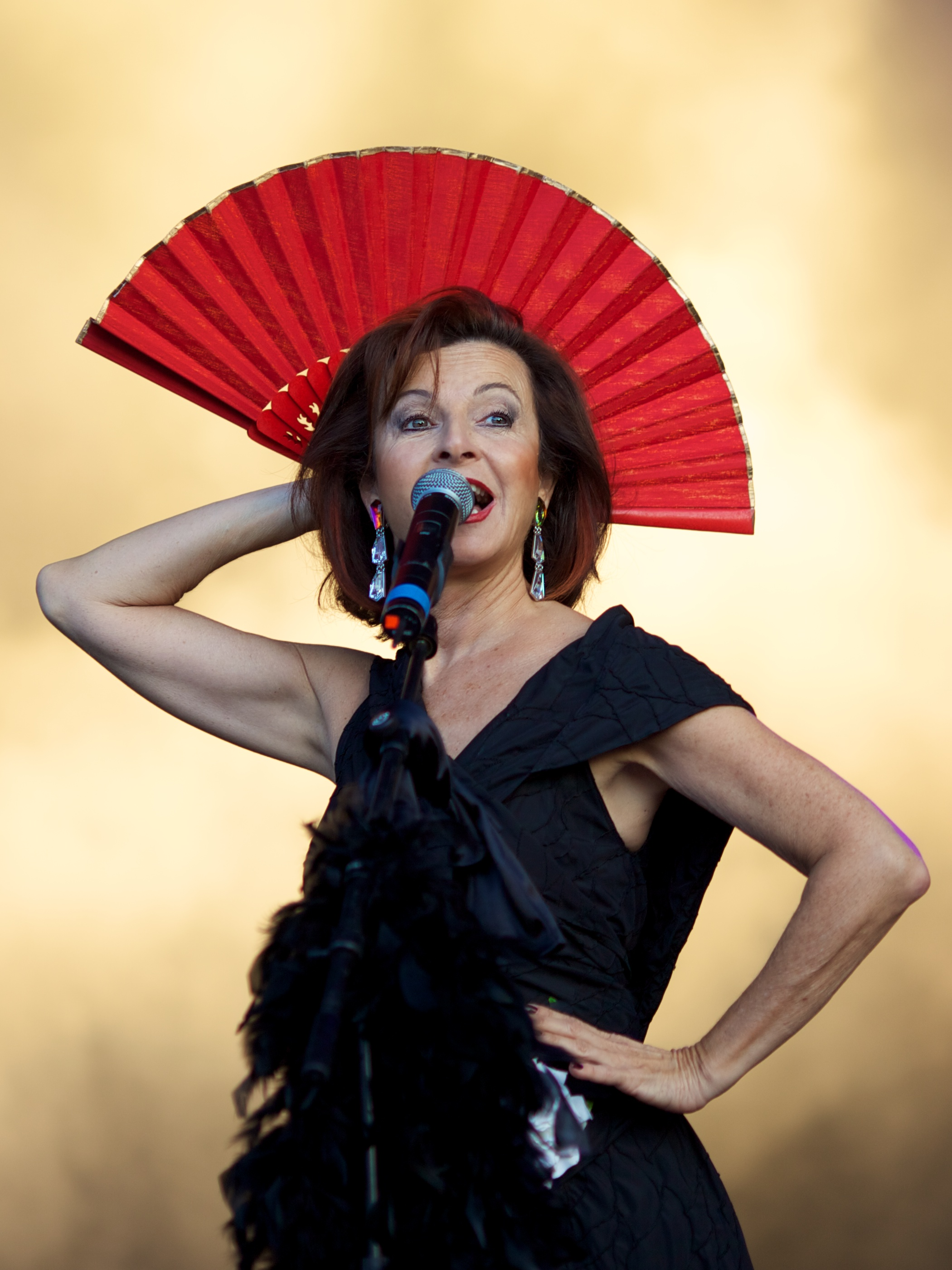
- Mateos in 2010

Background information
- Also known as: Mayte Matée
- Born: María Teresa Mateos Guillén; 7 February 1951 (age 75); Logroño, Old Castile, Francoist Spain
- Occupations: Singer; songwriter; dancer; actress
- Years active: 1976–present
- Labels: RCA; RCA Victor; Polydor
- Member of: Baccara (Baccara 2000)
- Formerly of: Baccara

María Teresa "Mayte" Mateos Guillén (born 7 February 1951), also known as Mayte Matée in the late 1980s, is a Spanish singer, dancer and actress. Along with the late María Mendiola, she is known as one half of the Spanish musical duo Baccara, which achieved international success in 1977, with their debut single "Yes Sir, I Can Boogie".

As a member of the original Baccara duo, Mateos recorded other major hits like Cara Mía and Sorry I'm A Lady; the duo represented Luxembourg in the Eurovision Song Contest in 1978, and entered in the Guinness Book of Records as the female musical duo with the highest number of sales with a single.

Following Baccara's dissolution in 1981 despite worldwide acclaim, Mateos pursued a brief solo career before reforming Baccara in 1983, with different singing partners over the years. Mateos' Baccara has released few new recordings, but has remained in demand for television and live appearances in countries such as Spain and Germany. During the 1990s, New Baccara which was headed by Maria Mendiola reverted to Baccara and as a consequence both Mateos and Mendiola headed different duos with the same name. Both principals subsequently had prolonged but separate legacy careers based on nostalgia and their earlier fame. As of 2021, Mateos is the last surviving member from the original Baccara duo.

== Early life ==
Mateos was born in Logroño, which was then part of Old Castile. She was the only daughter and eldest child amongst two brothers. She pursued a career in the Performing arts industry. Later on, she worked for the Spanish Television ballet company for four years, where she met María Mendiola.

== Career ==
=== Early career ===
In 1976, Mendiola proposed to Mateos the formation of a separate musical duo that involved singing and dancing, under the name "Venus". It was inspired by the popular Kessler Twins and with Paco Bermúdez as their representative. The pair thus left the ballet company and made their first television appearance with this stage name, on Enrique Martí Maqueda's program Palmarés.

The pair were engaged at a nightclub in the Aragon city of Zaragoza, which was a failed attempt to perform at the Cancela venue, when their contract was cancelled by the club manager, who thought that they were "too elegant" for the style of the show. They then relocated to the Canary Islands in search of work. Whilst there, they found that there was an audience for the performance of traditional Spanish music and dance, in a form that was adapted to suit international tastes.

=== Baccara (1977–1981) ===
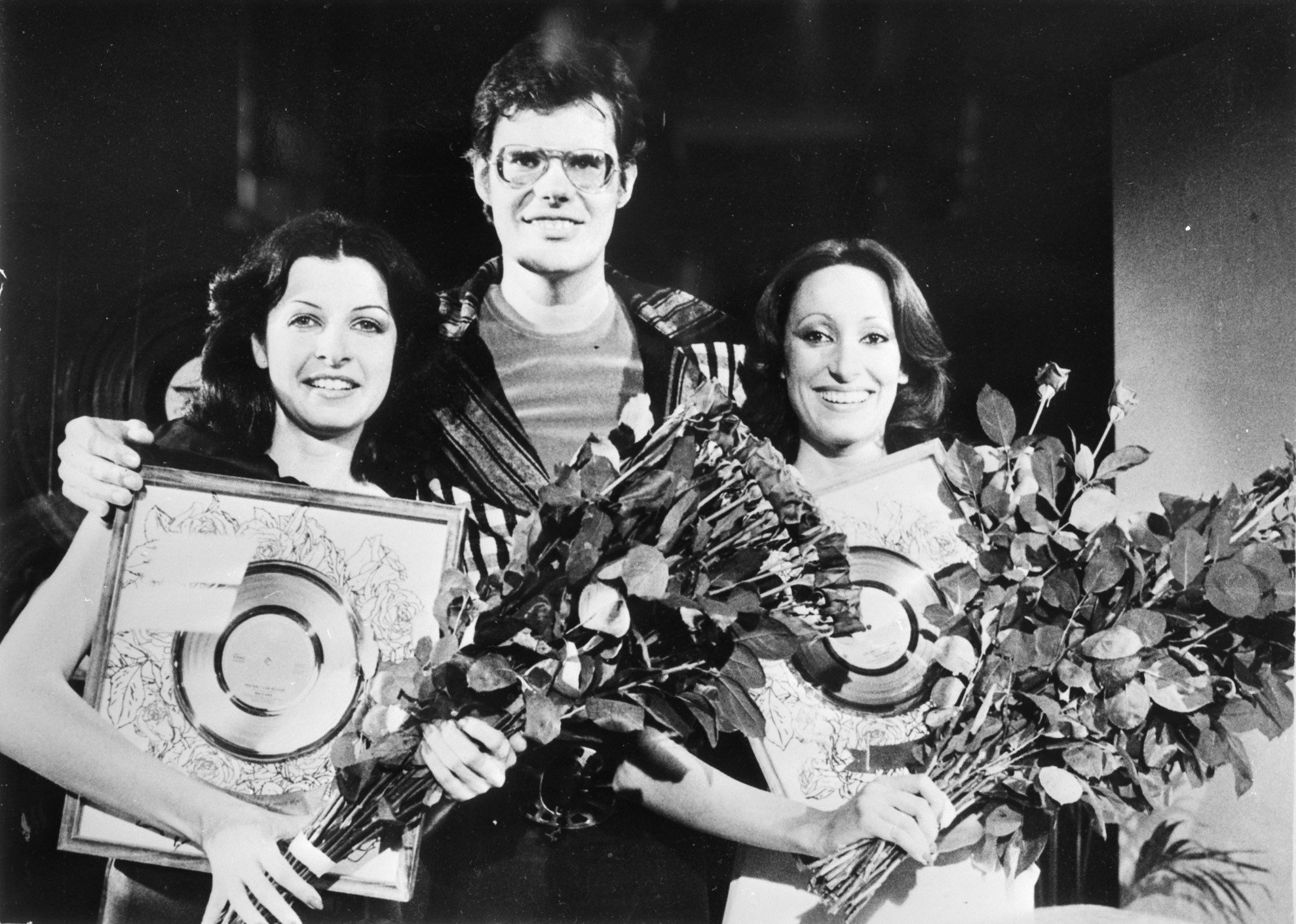
Baccara in 1977: Mayte Mateos (left) and Maria Mendiola (right)

In January 1977, Mendiola asked her husband, who was at the time managing the Tres Islas hotel in Fuerteventura, to perform there. Their performance was seen by Leon Deane, manager of the German subsidiary of record company RCA and other executives from the record label, who were staying at the hotel. The duo was invited to Hamburg by Deane, to do a voice test. After the test recording in the studio, they signed a record deal with RCA. The duo was then renamed from "Venus" to "Baccara" after the type of dark-red roses. Their signature appearance was created by Deane, for all of their performances, Mateos would dress in black, whereas Mendiola would dress in white.

In 1977, the writer Frank Dostal and Rolf Soja penned their debut single (and other Baccara songs) "Yes Sir, I Can Boogie", achieved international success. It also became popular across Europe, which resulted in it becoming their sole number one single in the United Kingdom, spending an entire week at the top of the UK singles chart in October 1977. The song has produced 16 million copies worldwide, making it one of the best-selling singles of all time. It was also featured in the 1977 edition of the Guinness Book of Records as the female musical duo with the highest number of sales with a single. They were the first female duo to reach number one in the UK, and the first Spanish act to do so, followed by Julio Iglesias four years later.

A follow-up single, "Sorry, I'm a Lady', also became an international hit, peaking at the top of the charts in Germany, the Netherlands and Belgium and reaching the top ten in the UK, Sweden and Switzerland. Most of the duo's songs were sung in English, although they also recorded in Spanish, German and French.

Touring in Europe during the late 1970s helped the duo establish a firm fan base in Germany (where their records continued to be produced) and the Scandinavian countries, and their Spanish-inspired take on the disco sound earned them recognition in Japan and Russia. Baccara represented West Germany at the eighth World Popular Song Festival held in November 1977 – until it ended in 1989, it was the largest contest in the world. Their song "Mad in Madrid", came 14th out of the 37 participating countries.

In 1978, the second Baccara album, Light My Fire, was released across Europe. It did not achieve the same level of international success as their first album, however it spawned the single "Parlez-vous français?", a French song which was selected on a national final to represent Luxembourg in the Eurovision Song Contest 1978. Despite it receiving full marks in the contest from Italy, Portugal, and Spain the duo finished in seventh place.

Baccara received further recognition in 1978 when they were granted Germany's most prestigious media award, Burda Publishing Group's Bambi prize. The duo made regular television appearances, becoming weekly guests on Sacha Distel's show in the UK, and on Musikladen in Germany. 1978 marked the peak of Baccara's artistic and commercial success. Later that year they released the single "The Devil Sent You to Lorado" and the single "Somewhere in Paradise".

In 1979, the album Colours and the separately recorded single – "Eins plus eins ist eins", was released to mark the United Nations' International Year of the Child and to celebrate the 20th anniversary of the UN adoption of the Declaration of the Rights of the Child.

Baccara's fourth and final album was Bad Boys, it was first released in 1981, and later released internationally in 1982. It contains the European single "Colorado". This was the first album not to be produced by Rolf Soja. The album was produced by Graham Sacher in London. The typical sound from the early Baccara albums was gone, a more pop-rock album was the result. The album also did not include the original Baccara logo that was on the three albums produced before Bad Boys. The album was not a commercial success like the past three albums. This album was the last time Mendiola and Mateos would record together.

By this time, this disco sound had been overshadowed by newer music movements such as punk rock, new wave, and synth-pop in much of Europe and interest was largely confined to those countries where the duo had an established fan base, notably Germany. The album was not released in the UK or the United States; they never achieved any recognition in the US despite some of their songs being given significant airplay. One music critic suggested that the Baccara formula lacked artistic depth but had been "mined for all it was worth" over two years until public interest moved onto other things.

=== Split from Baccara ===
The 1980 release of "Sleepy-Time-Joy" led to a disagreement within Baccara over the vocal mixes used. Mendiola was not satisfied because she argued her voice was not given sufficient prominence in the song’s arrangement and sued the RCA for breach of contract.

A court hearing in Munich resulted in 250,000 being recalled from the dealers and a revised recording with a new vocal mix issued in place of the original. A 28-second instrumental bridge was removed from the start of the recording (thereby reducing the play time from 6:12 to 5:44) the vocals were remixed, to give Mateos and Mendiola equal prominence.

In 1981, after RCA declined to renew their contract, the duo between Mateos and Mendiola broke up. Both members from the original duo, tried to launch solo-careers – but without much success; and later created their own line-ups of Baccara, with new stage companions.

As a result of both members launching their own versions of Baccara, the two women did not perform together again. Their paths nearly crossed once when both were performing in Moscow. According to Mateos, Mendiola crossed the street to avoid her.

Following María Mendiola's death in 2021, Mateos became the sole surviving member of the original Baccara duo.

=== Solo career ===
Following Baccara's dissolution in 1981, Mateos was now a solo singer, releasing three solo singles through the RCA-Victor label, "Souvenirs from Paradise", "Recuerdos del ayer" and "Malagueña", the first two were produced by Rolf Soja.

In 1982, Mateos represented Spain at the Korean Song Festival, with the songs "Temptation" and "Malagueña".

By 1988, she had released a series of singles and one studio album. Mateos released Spanish Dreams, under the name Mayte Matée, which saw moderate success among Baccara's original fan base. Spanish Dreams was re-released on CD in Germany in the 2004 under the title Noche Latina.

=== Return to Baccara (1983–present) ===
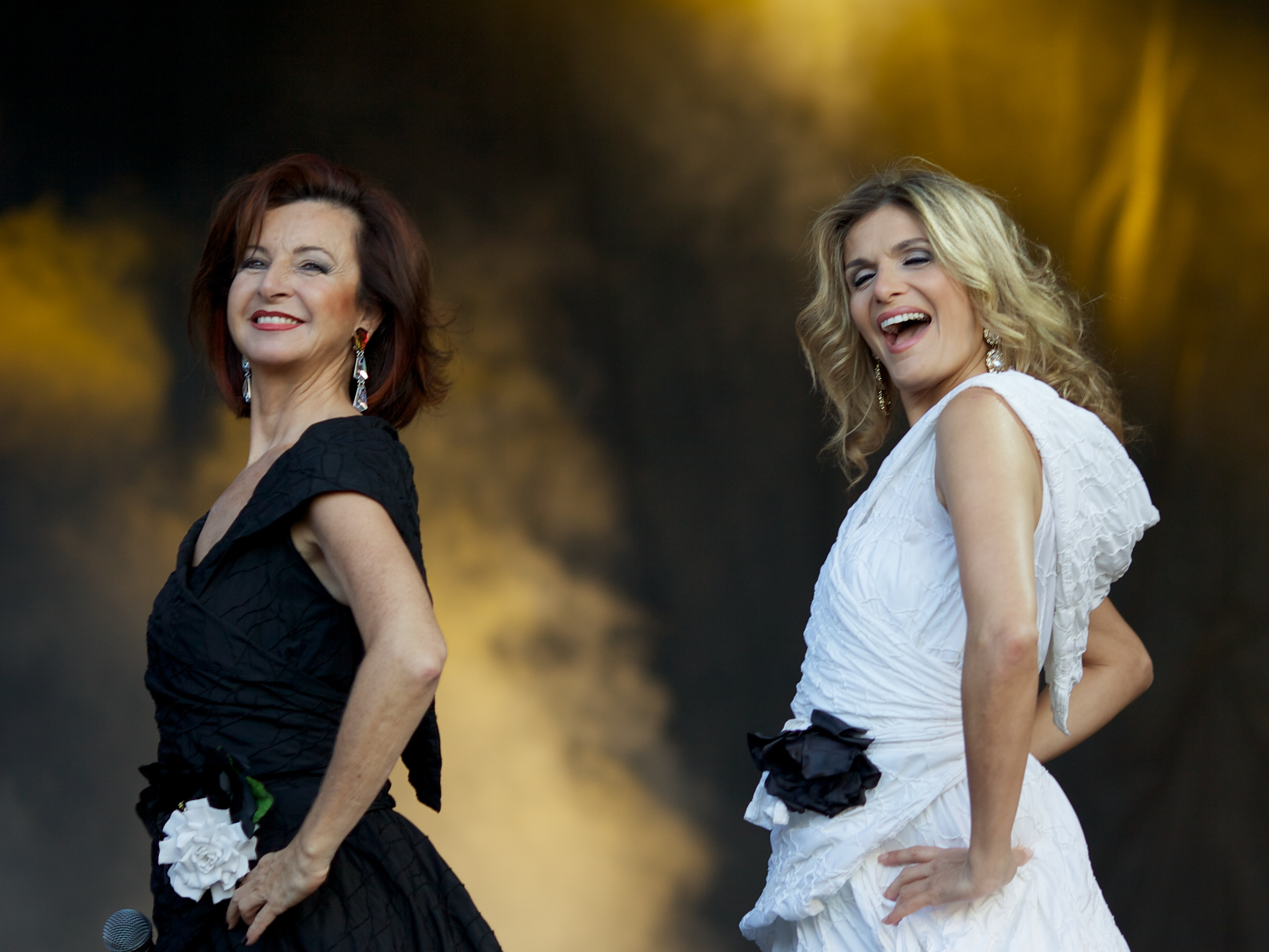
Mayte Mateos (left) and Paloma Blanco (right) performing in Skien, Norway, in 2010

Re-forming as Baccara in 1983 with Marisa Pérez, a contemporary of Mateos and Mendiola at the Spanish TV ballet company, Mateos re-established the band on the European entertainment circuit. Pérez was followed by a succession of partners including Ángela Muro, Sole García, Jane Comerford, Carmen, Cristina Sevilla, Paloma Blanco, Isabel Patton, Romy Abradelo, Rose, Francesca Rodrigues and María Marín. Mateos' last singing partner was fellow Spaniard Paloma Blanco. Although they had no new hits to their name, Mateos' Baccara had remained in demand for television and live performances, performing the band's extensive back catalogue – versions of which have been released as compilations – as well as up-tempo interpretations of traditional Spanish songs.

In late 1999, Mateos and Sevilla released a new studio album through RCA-Victor/Sony-BMG, Baccara 2000, as well as an updated dance version of breakthrough hit "Yes Sir, I Can Boogie" as a single. The album was produced by Thorsten Brötzman. Eventually the duo dropped the "2000" in their name, and became known again as just "Baccara".

In 2004, Mateos was once again involved with Eurovision, when she took part (along with Cristina Sevilla) in the Swedish Melodifestivalen preselection contest to represent Sweden with the song "Soy tu Venus". However, Baccara failed to qualify to the final after placing 7th in their heat. A full-length studio album recorded in Sweden, Soy tu Venus, followed the same year. The album was released by Lionheart Records.

In 2005, Mateos replaced Cristina Sevilla with Paloma Blanco. Sevilla later became a singing partner with María Mendiola. A new Baccara album, recorded by Mateos and Blanco, entitled Satin... In Black & White and produced by the original Baccara team Rolf Soja and Frank Dostal, was released on 30 May 2008. This album contained remakes of original Baccara recordings from the late 1970s and some new songs.

In 2013 Mateos sang on a cover version of "Yes Sir, I Can Boogie" by the London indie rock band Sala & The Strange Sound.

In 2016 Mateos' Baccara collaborated with Fundacion Tony Manera with a cover song of "Dame un Poco de Tu Amor" by "Juan Carlos Calderón".

After the COVID-19 pandemic, Mateos' Baccara performed only 3 times. One show took place in 2022 in Mateos' hometown Logroño, while two other shows were held in the island of Mallorca. Mateos' Baccara performance on New Year's Eve 2023–2024 was broadcast by the local TV channel "Canal 4".

On the 3 August 2025, Mayte Mateos announced on the official Facebook page for her Baccara that Paloma Blanco had left the duo and she was continuing Baccara but as a solo act.

== Personal life ==
In a 2014 interview, Mateos stated that she had been in a 12-year relationship with a man from Norway and had helped raise his two sons as her own. She also said that she had wanted to become a mother herself, but that it had never worked out. At the time of the interview, she was recovering from the loss of her mother, whilst living alone.

== Discography ==
=== Baccara ===
==== Studio albums ====
Year	Title	Peak chart positions								Label	Certifications
Year	Title	AUS	AUT	FIN	GER	NLD	NOR	SWE	UK	Label	Certifications
1977	Baccara	35	2	1	13	22	1	1	26	RCA Victor	IFPI FIN: 2× Platinum
1978	Light My Fire	—	—	1	—	—	11	10	—	RCA Victor	IFPI FIN: Gold
1979	Colours	—	—	—	—	—	—	—	—	RCA Victor	
1981	Bad Boys	—	—	—	—	—	—	—	—	RCA Victor	

=== Mayte Mateos' Baccara (1983–present) ===
==== Albums ====
- 1994: Our Very Best (Re-recordings plus five new songs)
- 1999: Baccara 2000
- 2004: Soy tu Venus
- 2008: Satin ... In Black & White

==== Maxi singles ====
- 1999: "Yes Sir, I Can Boogie '99"
- 2004: "Soy tu Venus"
- 2008: "Nights in Black Satin"

==== Singles ====
- 1994: "Yes Sir, I Can Boogie" (Italo Disco Mix)
- 1994: "Sorry, I'm a Lady" (Italo Disco Mix)
- 1999: "Yes Sir, I Can Boogie '99"
- 2011: "Christmas Medley" (Radio Edit) [Digital single]
- 2013: "Yes Sir, I Can Boogie 2013" (with Sala & the Strange Sounds)
- 2016: "Dame un Poco de Tu Amor" (with Fundacion Tony Manero)
