= Cristina Sevilla =

Spanish singer (born 1965)

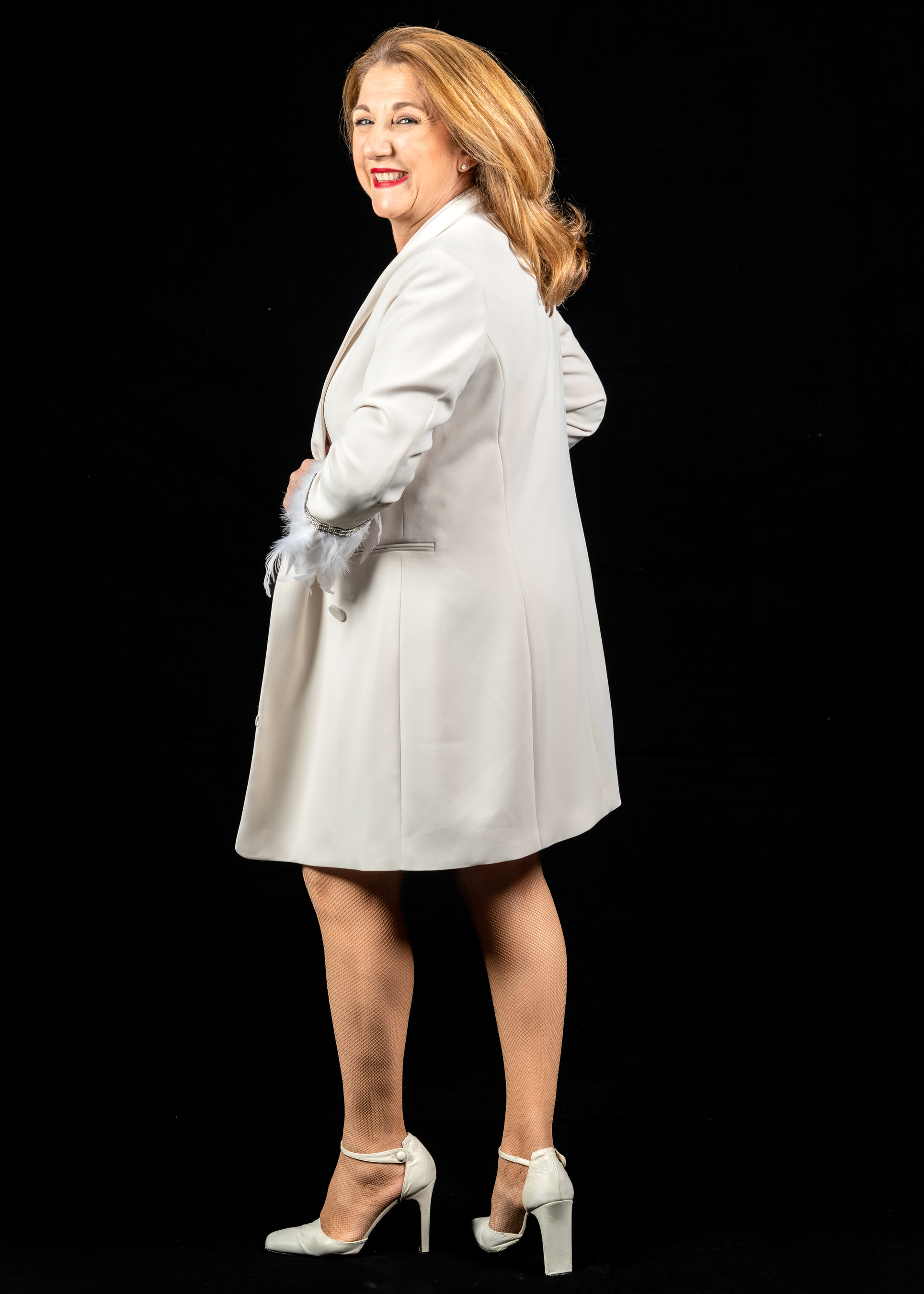
- Sevilla in 2022

Background information
- Born: March 3, 1965 (age 61); Madrid, New Castile, Francoist Spain
- Occupations: Singer; songwriter
- Years active: 1981–present
- Labels: RCA; Lionheart; Team 33 Music
- Member of: Baccara
- Website: www.baccara-oficial.com

María Cristina Sevilla Martínez (born March 3, 1965) is a Spanish singer and songwriter, a later member of the duo Baccara.

== Life and career ==
=== Early life ===
Cristina Sevilla was born in Madrid. Her father was a passionate musician who formed a musical group with Sevilla's uncle in the 1950s. For a while during her elementary school years, she took singing lessons, but Sevilla began seriously considering a singing career when she finished high school.

Before fully dedicating herself to music, Sevilla pursued higher education at the Teatinos Campus of the University of Málaga, where she studied Psychology for one year and Medicine for another.

Sevilla's first public performance took place at the opening of the Robinson Piano Club in Marbella on December 19, 1981. Her repertoire performed at the club included songs by such artists as Barbra Streisand, The Beatles or Frank Sinatra. Sevilla performed at the club for two years, marking the beginning of her professional career.

In interviews, Sevilla has recalled her experience at the Olivia Valère nightclub in Marbella, where she encountered several well-known personalities. During one of her performances, she met actor Sean Connery, who asked the audience for silence so that her singing could be heard.

According to these same accounts, Sevilla also mentioned an encounter with musician Prince at the Babilonia restaurant, part of the Olivia Valère complex. The American artist was accompanied by his wife and a group of bodyguards. While they were dining, Sevilla performed a repertoire of songs alongside the pianist, and at Prince’s request, she approached his table with a wireless microphone and sang The Beatles’ song Let It Be for him.

For several years, she performed with various pianists; later Sevilla's stepbrother joined her. They performed until 1986 at private events in music club Sonata in Fuengirola. Soon after, Sevilla and her stepbrother decided to open their own piano club, that they named Symphony. The club existed from 1988 to 1990.

In 1990, Sevilla performed a role of the protagonist's girlfriend in the series El C.I.D. Later Sevilla started performing with her band Calypso Orchestra, and they toured actively during nine years, performing in such countries as Morocco and Venezuela. In April 1998 María Mendiola (original member of Baccara) with her husband have visited Sevilla's performance.

From 1997 to 1999, Sevilla performed in the Spanish music program Canciones de nuestra vida on Antena 3 channel.

=== Mayte Mateos’ Baccara (1999-2004) ===
Cristina Sevilla joined the duo Baccara in 1999 formed by one of its original founders, Mayte Mateos. From 1999 to 2004, this line-up of Baccara released two albums. The first Baccara album, in the recording of which Sevilla took part, was released in 1999 and named Baccara 2000. In 2004, Sevilla's voice was recorded for one more album of Baccara – Soy Tu Venus. Sevilla and Mateos participated as Baccara in the Melodifestivalen, the Swedish national selection for the Eurovision Song Contest in 2004 with the song Soy Tu Venus.

=== Maria Mendiola’s Baccara (2011-2021) ===
In 2011, Cristina Sevilla joined the formation created by the second founding member of Baccara's original line-up, María Mendiola. During that time, Sevilla had the opportunity to meet with musicians such as Boney M., Gibson Brothers, and Ottawan. In 2012, María Mendiola and Cristina Sevilla performed at the Legends of Retro FM festival in 2012 at the Olympic Stadium in front of nearly 25,000 people. In May 2017, the album I Belong To Your Heart was released, featuring vocals by Mendiola and Sevilla, with the new repertoire that was, however, preserving the typical Baccara style. One of the songs was recorded with the popular Spanish performer, Mario Vaquerizo. In 2018, Mendiola and Sevilla released the single Gimme Your Love (Bobby To Extended Mix).

In September 2021, after the passing of María Mendiola, Sevilla decided to continue the project as a homage to Mendiola's legacy.

On January 26, 2022, spanish singer Helen de Quiroga joined Sevilla as her musical partner.

Throughout her career, Sevilla has visited with concerts about 50 countries. According to her opinion, the most exotic country where she has performed is Mongolia.

=== Personal life ===
Privately, Sevilla is married and a mother of two sons. As of 2011, Sevilla lives in Munich, Germany.
