= I Belong to Your Heart =

Studio album by Baccara
- Released: 5 May 2017
- Recorded: 2016
- Studio: Studio 33 Mallorca
- Length: 49:52
- Language: English
- Label: Team 33 Music
- Producer: Luis Rodríguez

Baccara chronology
Singles Collection (2006)	I Belong to Your Heart (2017)

Singles from I Belong to Your Heart
- 1. "I Belong to Your Heart" Released: 18 November 2016; 2. "You Are My Angel" Released: 14 August 2017; 3. "Gimme Your Love (Bobby to Extended Mix)" Released: 9 November 2018

I Belong to Your Heart is a studio album by Baccara, featuring María Mendiola and Cristina Sevilla. The album was released by Team 33 Music on 5 May 2017, in digital format, followed by a physical release on May 26. This album's launch coincided with the 40th anniversary of the original formation of Baccara.

== Background ==
On 18 November 2016, the first single from the album, "I Belong to Your Heart", premiered on YouTube, serving as a teaser for Baccara's new material after nearly a decade. Prior to the single's release, an article was published suggesting that one of the songs on the album was created in collaboration with Spanish artist Mario Vaquerizo. This collaboration resulted in the song "Super Sexy Baby", accompanied by a special video showing Baccara and Vaquerizo recording this song in a studio.

On 7 June 2017, Baccara was awarded a gold record at the SGAE (Spanish Society of Authors and Publishers) headquarters in recognition of their 40-year career. The event garnered coverage from print media and various television stations. Following the album's release, the extended version of You Are My Angel was included in the Best Of New Italo Disco Hits compilation released in August 2017. In addition, on 9 November 2018, the extended version of Gimme Your Love was released on all digital platforms.

== Release ==
I Belong To Your Heart was released by Team 33 Music on all digital platforms worldwide. In its physical form, the album was distributed by Team 33 Music / ZYX Music. In Western Asia, Central Asia, and certain parts of Europe, the album distribution was handled by United Music Group. On 5 June 2018, the album was reissued on vinyl in a limited edition of 300 copies by Magic Stars and In-Out Records.

== Track listing ==
I Belong To Your Heart track listing
No.	Title	Lyrics	Music	Length
1.	"I Belong to Your Heart"	Raúl Olivares	Raúl Olivares	3:51
2.	"Super Sexy Baby" (featuring Mario Vaquerizo)	Raúl Olivares	Raúl Olivares	4:12
3.	"I Will Follow You"	Luis Rodríguez, Philippe Escaño	Luis Rodríguez, Philippe Escaño	3:22
4.	"I Love You Moscow"	Gray Harvey, Vladimir Titenkov, Luis Rodríguez, Philippe Escaño	Gray Harvey, Vladimir Titenkov, Luis Rodríguez, Philippe Escaño	3:22
5.	"You Are My Angel"	Luis Rodríguez, Philippe Escaño	Luis Rodríguez, Philippe Escaño	3:07
6.	"All Your Love"	Stig Rästa	Stig Rästa	3:30
7.	"Conquer Any Distance"	Gray Harvey	Gray Harvey	3:18
8.	"Gimme Your Love"	Raúl Olivares	Raúl Olivares	3:51
9.	"Stand by Me"	Raúl Olivares	Raúl Olivares	3:48
10.	"Secret of Love"	Raúl Olivares	Raúl Olivares	4:45
11.	"Fantasy Boy 2017"	Reinhardt Frantz, Lee Smith	Reinhardt Frantz, Lee Smith	3:53
12.	"My Funky Love"	Gerhard Braunegger, Gray Harvey	Gerhard Braunegger, Gray Harvey	3:25
13.	"I Belong to Your Heart" (extended)	Raúl Olivares	Raúl Olivares	5:52
Total length:				49:52

Extended singles
No.	Title	Lyrics	Music	Length
1.	"You Are My Angel" (extended)	Luis Rodríguez, Philippe Escaño	Luis Rodríguez, Philippe Escaño	4:26
2.	"Gimme Your Love" (Bobby To Extended Mix)	Raúl Olivares	Raúl Olivares	6:57

== Personnel ==
=== Musicians ===
- María Mendiola – vocals (all tracks)
- Cristina Sevilla – vocals (all tracks)

=== Production ===
- Luis Rodríguez – producer
- Philippe Escaño – co-producer

== Release history ==
Release history for I Belong to Your Heart
Country	Date	Format(s)	Label	Ref.
Various	5 May 2017	Digital	Team 33 Music	
Various	26 May 2017	CD	Team 33 Music	
Various	5 June 2018	LP	Team 33 Music	
