= Bad Boys (Baccara album) =

Studio album by Baccara
- Released: 1981
- Recorded: 1981
- Studio: Lansdowne Studios, London W11; Vineyard Studios, Southwark, London
- Genre: Pop; disco
- Length: 41:03
- Label: RCA Victor
- Producer: Graham Sacher

Baccara chronology
Colours (1979)	Bad Boys (1981)	The Original Hits (1990)

Professional ratings
Review scores
Source	Rating
Allmusic	3/5 stars

Bad Boys is the fourth and final studio album by the original formation of Spanish duo Baccara, first released on label RCA-Victor in Germany in 1981. It contains European single release "Colorado". This is the first album to have not been produced by Rolf Soja. The album was produced by Graham Sacher in London, UK. The typical Baccara sound of early albums was gone, a more pop-rock album was the result. Also missing was the original Baccara logo that was on the three albums produced before Bad Boys. This album was not a commercial success nor did it sell as much as the first three albums. This album would be the last time the original girls would record together.

The rights to the RCA-Victor back catalogue are currently held by Sony BMG Music Entertainment – the original Bad Boys album in its entirety remains unreleased on compact disc. However, all tracks can be found on the 3-disc 30th Anniversary box set issued in 2007.

== Track listing ==
All tracks composed by Graham Sacher and arranged by Bruce Baxter

=== Side A ===
1. "Bad Boys" – 4:25
2. "Last Night" – 2:50
3. "Ohio" – 3:04
4. "Love Control" – 2:57
5. "Spend the Night" – 3:07
6. "Rio" – 3:46

=== Side B ===
1. "Boogaloo" – 2:38
2. "Colorado" – 3:30
3. "Mucho, Mucho" – 3:25
4. "Woman to Woman" – 3:36
5. "Heart, Body and Soul" – 4:09
6. "Love Songs" – 3:36

== Personnel ==
- Mayte Mateos – vocals
- María Mendiola – vocals
