= Baccara =

Spanish female vocal duo

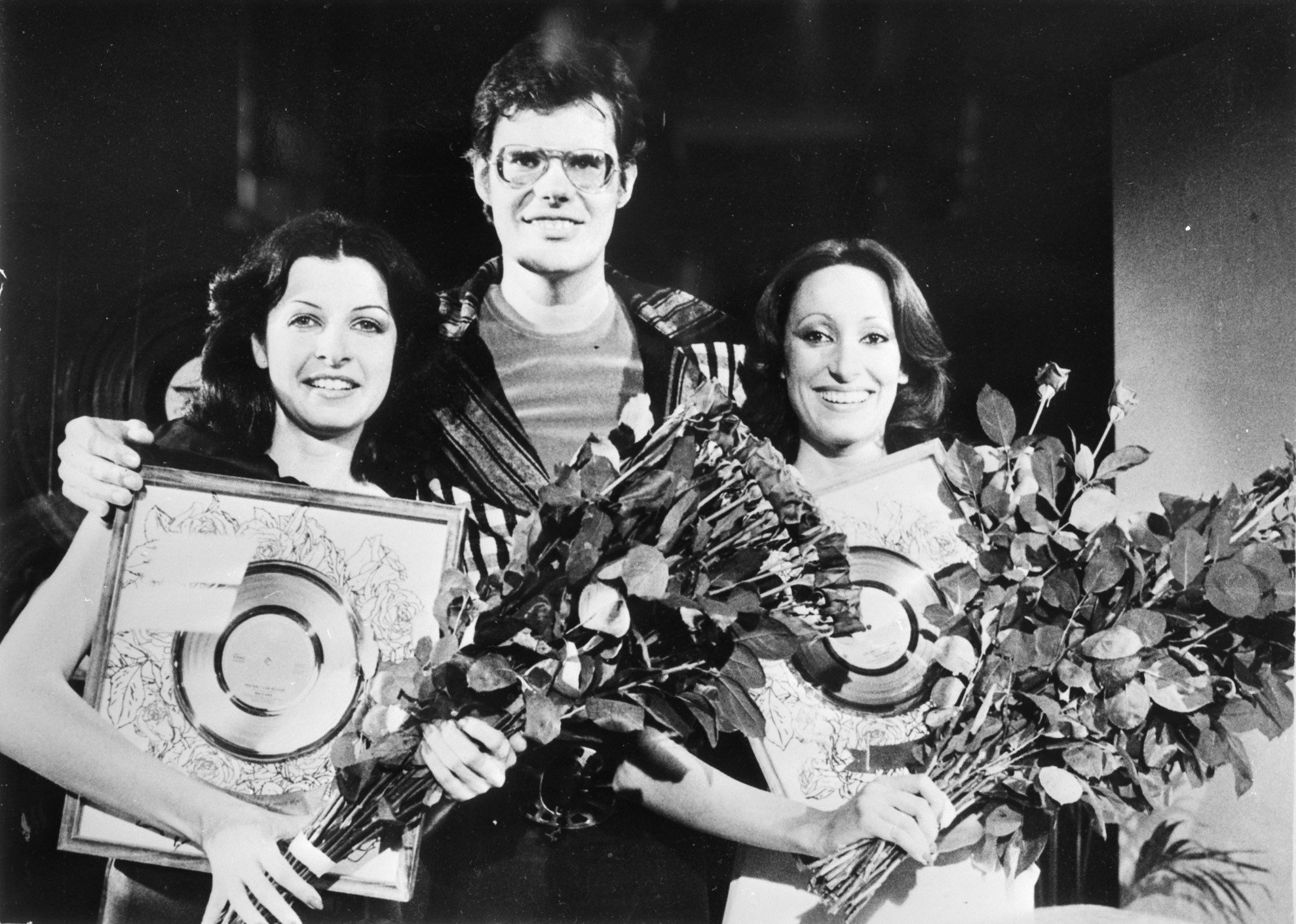
- Baccara in 1977: Mayte Mateos (left) and María Mendiola (right)

Background information
- Also known as: New Baccara; Baccara 2000 (later formations)
- Origin: Madrid, Spain
- Genres: Pop; Eurodisco; disco
- Years active: 1977–1981 (original Baccara); 1983–present (Mayte Mateos' Baccara); 1985–2021 (María Mendiola's Baccara); 2022–present (Cristina Sevilla's Baccara)
- Label: RCA
- Formerly of: Venus
- Members: Mayte Mateos' Baccara: Mayte Mateos; Paloma Blanco; Cristina Sevilla's Baccara: Cristina Sevilla; Helen de Quiroga
- Past members: María Mendiola; see below
- Website: www.baccara-oficial.com (Cristina Sevilla's)

Baccara was a Spanish female vocal duo formed in 1977 by Spanish artists María Mendiola (4 April 1952 – 11 September 2021) and Mayte Mateos (born 7 February 1951). The duo rapidly achieved international success with their debut single "Yes Sir, I Can Boogie", which reached number one across much of Europe and became the best-selling single of all time by a female duo, eventually selling more than 16 million copies worldwide. A successful follow-up single ("Sorry, I'm a Lady") and European tour led to a number of album releases, numerous television appearances and the duo's selection to represent Luxembourg in the Eurovision Song Contest 1978 with "Parlez-vous français?".

Despite a substantial following in Spain, Germany and Japan, by 1981 their blend of disco, pop and Spanish folk music was no longer fashionable, and by 1983 Mateos and Mendiola were both working on solo projects. Achieving little success as solo artists, the two formed duos of their own: separate incarnations of the original Baccara appeared during the middle of the decade, with Mendiola fronting New Baccara and Mateos keeping the duo's original name. During the 1990s, New Baccara reverted to Baccara and as a consequence both Mateos and Mendiola headed different duos with the same name. Both principals subsequently had prolonged but separate legacy careers based on nostalgia and their earlier fame.

Mendiola's Baccara has seen more international recognition, releasing a string of Hi-NRG club hits such as "Fantasy Boy", "Call Me Up" and "Touch Me" in the late 1980s and the later UK club hit "Wind Beneath My Wings". Mateos' Baccara has released few new recordings, but has remained in demand for television and live appearances in countries such as Spain and Germany, where the original Baccara developed a loyal fan base, performing the duo's back-catalogue and modernised versions of traditional Spanish songs.

== Formation ==
In 1976, María Mendiola (prima ballerina of Alberto Portillo's Spanish Television ballet) proposed to her colleague Mayte Mateos the formation of a separate singing and dancing duo (using the title Venus). After leaving the ballet company, the duo's initial act was simply that of variety show dancers. Their first television appearance was on the Palmarés light entertainment programme and they were engaged at a nightclub in the Aragon city of Zaragoza, but their contract was cancelled when the club manager decided that they were "too elegant" for the style of the show. Mateos and Mendiola relocated to the Canary Islands in search of work. Here they found that there was an audience for the performance of traditional Spanish music and dance in a form that was adapted to suit international tastes.

The duo were spotted by Leon Deane, manager of the German subsidiary of record company RCA, while performing flamenco dance and traditional Spanish songs for mostly German tourists in the Tres Islas Hotel on the island of Fuerteventura. María, who was the only one who spoke English, served as a bridge between the promotion managers and the duo to reach an agreement. Deane invited them to Hamburg so they could do a voice test at the record company. He was the prime mover behind what became Baccara, developing their stage performance while recruiting their instrumental support. Mateos and Mendiola were retitled Baccara, after the name of the black rose, in reference to the women's dark Spanish appearance.

Leon Deane is generally credited with the Baccara formula—consisting of breathy lyrics, lush backing, a disco beat and the striking image of two women (Mateos dressed in black, Mendiola in white) dancing. While drawing lightly on Spanish flamenco song and dance tradition, the formula was rooted in 1970s disco music.

== Baccara (1977–1981) ==
Together with fellow writer Frank Dostal, Rolf Soja penned their début single "Yes Sir, I Can Boogie" and most of their other 1970s hits. Recorded in the Netherlands and released in 1977, "Yes Sir, I Can Boogie" was an enormous pan-European hit and was a prime example of the phenomenon that is known as the "summer hit". It is also an example of the Euro disco genre, described in The Independent newspaper in 1999 as follows :

This mind-bending Common Market melding of foreign accents, bad diction, bizarre arrangements and lightweight production, usually top-heavy with strings

"Yes Sir, …" reached the top of the charts in Germany, the Netherlands, the UK, Sweden, Belgium, and Switzerland, and number three in France. Baccara sold more than 16 million copies of "Yes Sir, I Can Boogie" and featured in the 1977 edition of the Guinness Book of Records as the highest-selling female musical duo to date. They were the first female duo to reach number one in the UK, and had the only number one by a Spanish artist in the UK until Julio Iglesias, four years later.

Later that year, a self-titled album, written and produced by Soja and Dostal, was released. The album Baccara was the first platinum selling album—actually double platinum in 1978—by a foreign group in Finland. In 2013, the album still remains the sixth biggest selling album of all time in Finland.

A follow-up single, "Sorry, I'm a Lady", was also an international hit, peaking at the top of the charts in Germany, the Netherlands and Belgium and reaching the top ten in the UK, Sweden and Switzerland. Most of Baccara's recordings were sung in English although they also recorded in Spanish, German and French. They recorded different language versions of some songs (see Discography below).

Touring in Europe during the late 1970s helped the duo establish a firm fan base in Germany (where their records continued to be produced) and the Scandinavian countries, and their Spanish-flavoured interpretation of the disco sound also brought them recognition in Japan and Russia. Baccara represented West Germany at the eighth World Popular Song Festival held in November 1977 – until it ended in 1989 the largest such contest in the world. Their song, "Mad in Madrid", came 14th out of 37 participating countries.

In 1978 the second Baccara album, Light My Fire, was released across Europe, and while not matching the international success of the first, it spawned the single "Parlez-vous français ?" which was selected on a national final to represent Luxembourg at the Eurovision Song Contest 1978. Despite full marks in the contest from Italy, Portugal, and Spain the duo finished in seventh place. However high sales, particularly in Denmark, Sweden, and Belgium, meant that the single was a commercial success.

Further recognition came in 1978 when Baccara was granted Germany's most prestigious media award, Burda Publishing Group's Bambi prize. The duo made regular television appearances, becoming weekly guests on Sacha Distel's show in the UK, and on Musikladen in Germany. 1978 was the high point of Baccara's artistic and commercial success. Late that year the duo released the single "The Devil Sent You to Lorado" with "Somewhere in Paradise" as its B side. Both of these Baccara recordings have become iconic. "Somewhere in Paradise" (with its allusions to life after death) is regularly played by Christian radio stations while "The Devil…" (with its background pistol shots) is sometimes identified with the gay community. A Spanish-language version of "The Devil…" ("El diablo te mandó a Lorado") was released at the same time as the English one, and both the original English version and "Somewhere in Paradise" subsequently featured on the duo's first greatest hits compilation, The Hits of Baccara, released under the name Los Éxitos de Baccara in Spain and South America.

In 1979, the album Colours and the separately-recorded single "Eins plus eins ist eins", released to mark the United Nations' International Year of the Child and celebrate the 20th anniversary of the UN adoption of the Declaration of the Rights of the Child. Although still successful, sales of these and other releases in 1979 were disappointing.

Baccara's fourth and final album in the band's original incarnation was Bad Boys, released in 1981. By this time, the disco sound had been overshadowed by newer music movements such as punk, new wave and synthpop in much of Europe and interest was largely confined to those countries where the duo had an established fan base, notably Germany. The album was not released in the UK or US; they never achieved any recognition in the US despite some of their songs being given significant airplay. One music critic suggested that the Baccara formula lacked artistic depth but had been "mined for all it was worth" over two years until public interest moved on to other things. The same critic also drew attention to an element of "anti-feminist subservience" in the lyrics of some Baccara songs.

The New Musical Express commented in May 2002 (page 6): "Think what you like about Baccara, seen today their 1978 Eurovision performance has a certain style while their competition from that event looks dated and amateurish".

== Split ==
The 1980 single release of "Sleepy-Time-Toy" led to a disagreement within Baccara over the vocal mix used. Mendiola complained that her voice was not given sufficient prominence in the song's arrangement and sued RCA for breach of contract. Mendiola's case was that the song should not have been released as a Baccara recording when it amounted to a Mateos solo. A court hearing in Munich resulted in 250,000 records being recalled from dealers and a revised recording with a new vocal mix being issued in place of the original. A 28-second instrumental bridge was removed from the start of the recording (thereby reducing the play time from 6:12 to 5:44) and the vocals were remixed so as to give Mendiola and Mateos equal prominence. The artwork for the single's cover appears to have remained unchanged. The single failed to chart successfully (see Discography below).

As a result of the dispute, relationships between all parties involved were damaged. One consequence of this was that Soja and Dostal were not involved with Baccara's final album. The duo recorded Bad Boys with Bruce Baxter and Graham Sacher in the UK. Neither the album nor its spin-off single "Colorado" were successful. In 1981, after RCA declined to renew their contract, Mateos and Mendiola ended their professional partnership and both launched solo careers.

By 1988, both artists had released a series of singles and one studio album each of their own – Mendiola with Born Again and Mateos with Spanish Dreams under the name Mayte Mathée – which saw moderate success among Baccara's original fan base. Mateos' Spanish Dreams was re-released on CD in Germany in the 2000s under the title Noche Latina but Mendiola's Born Again still remains unreleased in digital format. However, there remained a demand for Baccara's music, particularly on the European television circuit, and by the end of the decade both Mateos and Mendiola had formed their own versions of Baccara with new singing partners. Despite a series of name and line-up changes, both Baccara duos continued to perform around Europe and have released new albums. Both have also made re-recordings of their hits for various minor record labels, which are regularly re-packaged and re-issued under the original Baccara name, occasionally with photos of the original duo, Mateos and Mendiola, on the album covers. However, the original song versions – those recorded between 1977 and 1981 – remain the property of Sony Music Entertainment, which now holds the rights to the RCA back catalogue.

On the occasion of Baccara's 30th Anniversary, Sony-BMG Germany released a comprehensive three CD box set on 31 August 2007. This collection includes 50 RCA original recordings. Several songs such as "Mad in Madrid", "Amoureux", "Baila tú", "En el año 2000", "Eins plus eins ist eins" and "Candido" made their debut on CD. The only tracks missing from this otherwise comprehensive career retrospective are the US 12" versions of "Yes Sir, I Can Boogie" and "Sorry, I'm a Lady" from debut album Baccara, the full 12 minute album version of "Baby, Why Don't You Reach Out?"/"Light My Fire" and the extended album version of "Darling" from 1978's Light My Fire and the extended 12" versions of "Body-Talk" and "By 1999" from 1979's Colours.

After the split, Mateos and Mendiola never performed together again.

=== Mayte Mateos' Baccara (1983–present) ===
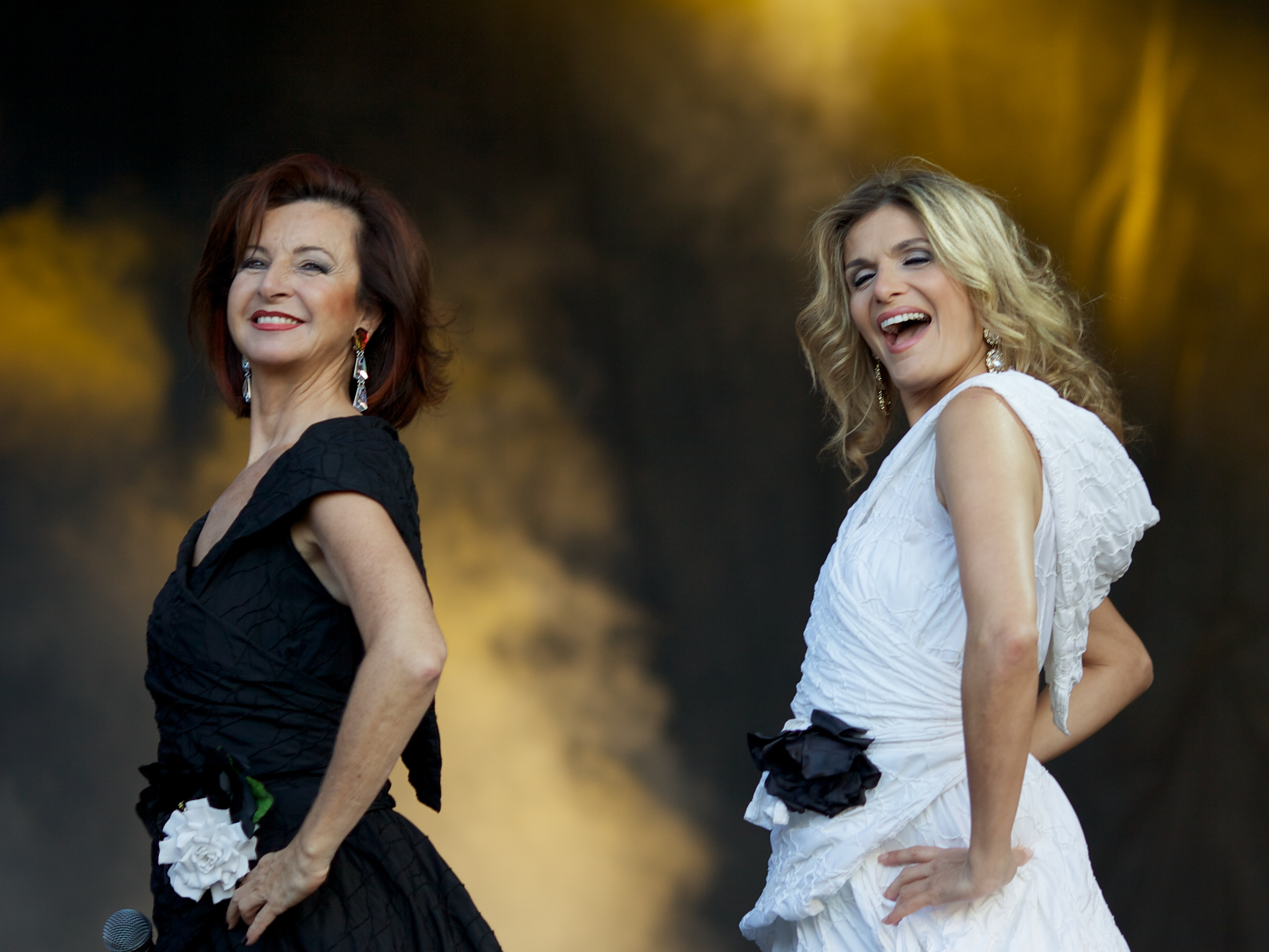
Mayte Mateos (left) and Paloma Blanco (right) performing in Skien, Norway, in 2010

Following the original Baccara's dissolution in 1981 Mayte Mateos released three solo singles through the RCA-Victor label, "Souvenirs from Paradise", "Recuerdos del ayer" and "Malaguena", the first two produced by Rolf Soja. Re-forming as Baccara in 1983 with Marisa Pérez, a contemporary of Mateos and Mendiola at the Spanish TV ballet company, Mateos re-established the band on the European entertainment circuit. Pérez was followed by a succession of partners including Ángela Muro, Sole García, Jane Comerford, Carmen, Cristina Sevilla, Paloma Blanco, Isabel Patton, Romy Abradelo, Rose, Francesca Rodrigues and María Marín. Mateos' last singing partner was fellow Spaniard Paloma Blanco. Although they had no new hits to their name, Mateos' Baccara had remained in demand for television and live performances, performing the band's extensive back catalogue – versions of which have been released as compilations – as well as up-tempo interpretations of traditional Spanish songs.

In 1999, Mateos and Cristina Sevilla released a new studio album through RCA-Victor/Sony-BMG, Baccara 2000, as well as an updated dance version of breakthrough hit "Yes Sir, I Can Boogie" as a single. The album was produced by Thorsten Brötzman, who has previously worked as a keyboarder during Thomas Anders tour in Russia in 1995, and took part in many recordings of Blue System.

In 2004, Mayte Mateos was once again involved with Eurovision, when she took part (along with Cristina Sevilla) in the Swedish Melodifestivalen preselection contest to represent Sweden with the song "Soy tu Venus". However, Baccara failed to qualify to the final after placing 7th in their heat. A full-length studio album recorded in Sweden, Soy tu Venus, followed the same year. The album was released by Lionheart Records.

In 2005, Mayte Mateos replaced Cristina Sevilla with Paloma Blanco. A new Baccara album, recorded by Mateos and Blanco, entitled Satin... In Black & White and produced by the original Baccara team Rolf Soja and Frank Dostal, was released on 30 May 2008. This album contained remakes of original Baccara recordings from the late 1970s and some new songs. Although appreciated by Baccara fans, sales of the album were disappointing.

In 2013 Mateos sang on a cover version of "Yes Sir I Can Boogie" by the London indie rock band Sala & The Strange Sound.

In 2016 Mateos' Baccara collaborated with Fundacion Tony Manera with a cover song of "Dame un Poco de Tu Amor" by "Juan Carlos Calderón".

After the pandemic, Mateos' Baccara performed only 3 times. One show took place in 2022 in Mateos' hometown Logroño, while two other shows were held on the island of Mallorca. Mateos' Baccara performance on New Year's Eve 2023/2024 was broadcast by the local TV channel "Canal 4".

On the 3 August 2025, Mayte Mateos announced on the official Facebook page for her Baccara that Paloma Blanco had left the duo and she was continuing Baccara but as a solo act.

=== María Mendiola's Baccara (1985–2021) ===
Initially called New Baccara to distinguish it from Mayte Mateos' re-formed Baccara, Mendiola teamed up with vocalist Marisa Pérez and in 1987 reached the top five in Spain and top 40 in Germany with the single "Call Me Up", written by Ian Cussick. 1988 saw the duo release a series of Euro-influenced Hi-NRG dance tracks on the Bellaphon recording label. "Call Me Up", "Fantasy Boy" and "Touch Me" were produced by Luis Rodríguez (producer), and were big club hits across Europe. Mendiola wrote the lyrics for "Talisman", the Spanish version of "Call Me Up". This song brought New Baccara significant popularity in Latin America. In 1990 the album F.U.N. was released on the Dureco label.

In the beginning of the 1990s New Baccara was renamed back to Baccara, and releases continued, although the group did not chart as their output was directed towards the club scene with singles pressed in strictly limited quantities. A version of Bette Midler's "Wind Beneath My Wings", released on vinyl by 'Loading Bay' label in 1993, and re-released on maxi-CD in 1999 by the label 'Majic Music', was also a hit in UK clubs.

In 2000, Mendiola and Pérez as Baccara released the album Face to Face. Mendiola and Pérez toured United Kingdom in 2000 together with The Supremes and The Three Degrees and appeared at Wembley Stadium, London with various other music groups. In April 2005, they appeared in the third episode of British reality show Hit Me Baby One More Time, performing "Yes Sir I Can Boogie" and a contemporary song – "Hero", originally by Enrique Iglesias.

In August 2005, Mendiola and Pérez were honoured with a memorial on Vienna's "Musical Mile", along its Hollywood-style "Walk of the Stars".

In late 2008 Marisa Pérez was diagnosed with acute polyarthritis. It was agreed that until she recovered, her place at 'Baccara' live performances would be taken by Mendiola's niece Laura Mendiola. Maria Mendiola and Laura Mendiola performed as 'Baccara' in 2008 in Moscow, at the "Disco 80" festival. This measure (said to be temporary) allowed Mendiola's Baccara to honour its outstanding commitments in 2009 and 2010.

Since 2011 Maria Mendiola has been performing with Cristina Sevilla (who was the stage partner of Mayte Mateos from 1999 till 2004).

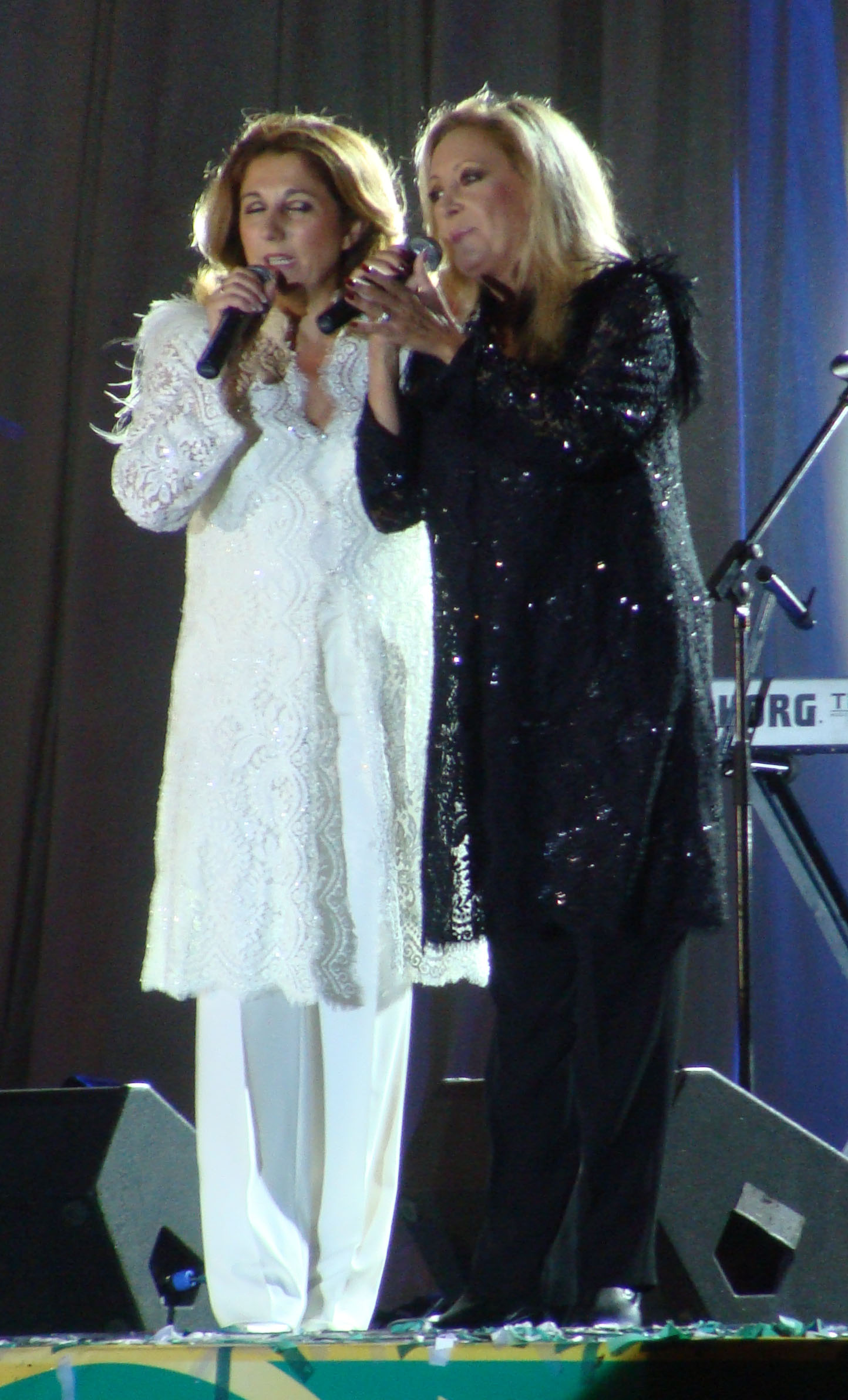
Cristina Sevilla (left) and Maria Mendiola (right) on stage in Russia in 2011

In 2016 Mendiola and Sevilla released a new version of "Yes Sir, I Can Boogie" with the band Plugin. In 2017 they released an album I Belong to Your Heart produced by Luis Rodríguez (producer) with 11 brand new songs plus an extended version of "I Belong to Your Heart", and a new version of "Fantasy Boy".

In November 2020, "Yes Sir, I Can Boogie" returned to the UK charts after it was featured in several online videos posted by members of the Scotland football team. The team qualified for the European championships, and were heard singing the song in celebratory videos. It became a 'new' number 57 hit for Sony Music on the national singles chart spending another 2 weeks on the Official Singles Sales Chart Top 100. Maria Mendiola was quoted as saying she would be happy to record a new version for the finals.

In June 2021, Scottish DJ George 'GBX' Bowie released a new remixed version of "Yes Sir, I Can Boogie" for Scottish fans to use as an anthem for UEFA Euro 2020. This dance version included new vocals from Baccara and also reached the Official Singles Sales Chart Top 100, peaking at number 11.

Mendiola died in Madrid on 11 September 2021, at the age of 69, surrounded by her family in hospital Her stage partner Cristina Sevilla wrote and posted on their Instagram @baccaraoficial "How hard is it for me to post this.. María, wonderful artist, but for me above all.. My friend has left us today. I am lost for words.. I can only thank so much how i have received from her and tell her what i had chance to tell her so many times in my life... I Love You".. Her family said that she had been dealing with blood deficiency for two decades.

=== Cristina Sevilla's Baccara (2022–present) ===
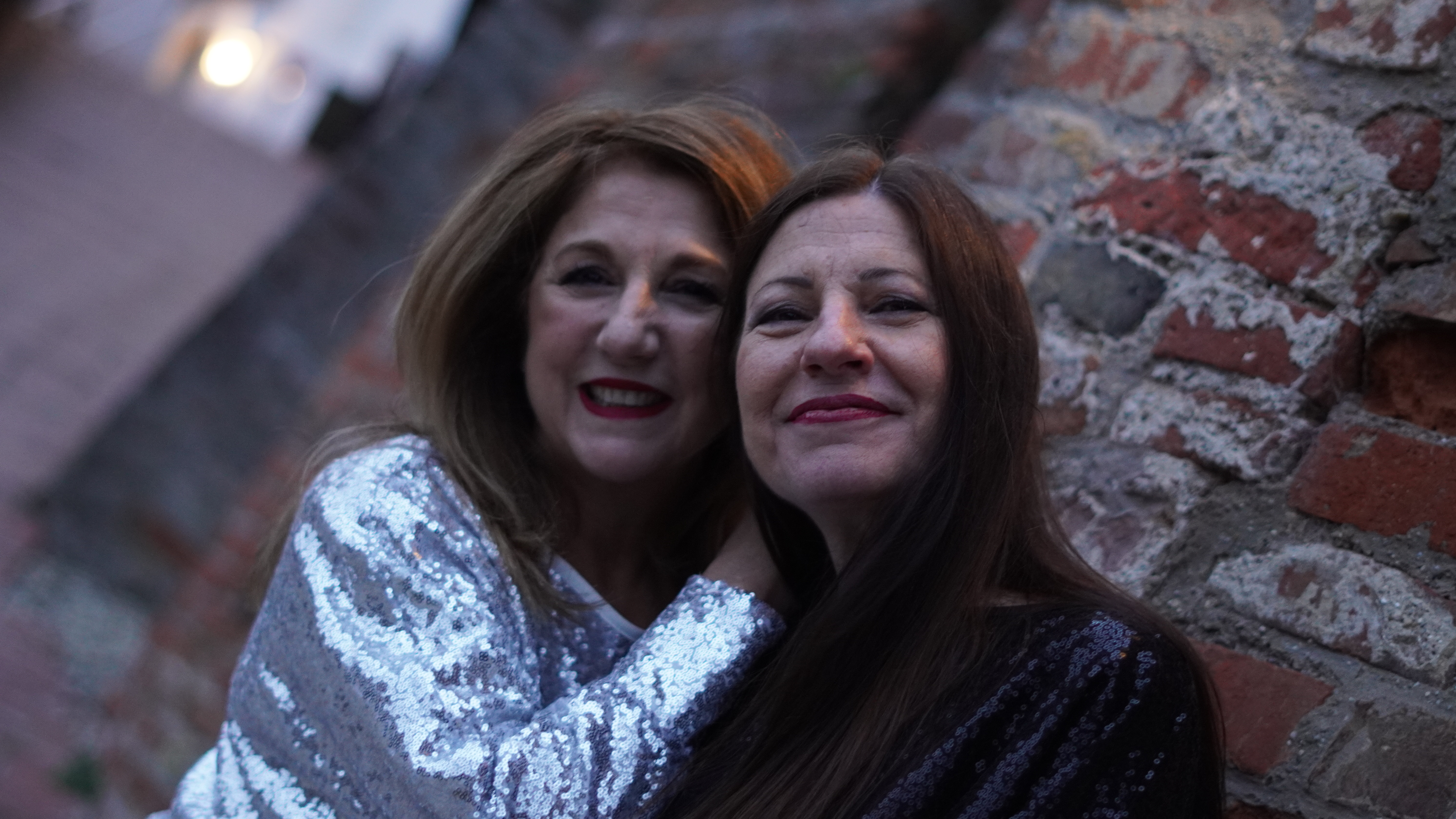
Sevilla and De Quiroga in 2021

After the passing of María Mendiola, Cristina Sevilla decided to continue with the formation, having the property and rights over the brand, as a homage to María Mendiola's legacy. On 26 January 2022, the official announcement was made introducing their new member, Helen de Quiroga, a singer with a long career and known for her work with such artists as Miguel Bosé and Alejandro Sanz. She has also starred in "Cats (musical)" and took part in recording of Spanish versions of Disney films The Little Mermaid and The Lion King. Sevilla and de Quiroga appeared on stage as Baccara for the first time in Kyiv, the capital of Ukraine, in the middle of February 2022.

Cristina Sevilla's Baccara is not a tribute band. It's Baccara with officially registered rights at both the European Union Intellectual Property Office (EUIPO) and the UK Intellectual Property Office (IPO).

Throughout 2022, Sevilla and de Quiroga performed at various events, such as Christian Dior defile in Seville, Madrid Pride Plaza de España stage in Madrid, Guilfest in London, Doune the rabbit hole festival in Scotland, and Kuuslagufestival in Estonia.

In early September 2022, Baccara record label, "Team 33," released digitally Baccara's new single, "Don't Let This Feeling Go Away", produced by Luis Rodríguez (producer).

In October 2022, Sevilla and de Quiroga performed as Baccara at flowers & garden exhibition in Brandenburg, Germany. In November 2022, they traveled to the United States to perform two concerts in California together with Gina T.

In 2023, Baccara continued their international concert tour. In February 2023 they performed in Bolivia at the carnaval of Oruro.

In May 2023, the label "In Out Record" released on vinyl the maxi-single "Don't Let This Feeling Go Away", that featured extended versions of the aforementioned song, as well as "Call Me Up" and "Fantasy Boy", re-recorded with the vocals of Sevilla and de Quiroga.

Later in 2023, Baccara took part in Nostalgia Fest in Latvia and in New Wave Fest in United States in June, played a solo-concert in Kazakhstan in July, took part in Arts & Culture festival in Romania in August, in Etam live show in Paris, France in September and in wine festival in Moldova in November.

In the end of November 2023, 'Team 33' released digitally the new Baccara single, entitled "When I'm with you".

In January 2024, Sevilla and de Quiroga performed in London.

== Discography ==
=== Baccara ===
==== Studio albums ====
Year	Title	Peak chart positions								Label	Certifications
Year	Title	AUS	AUT	FIN	GER	NLD	NOR	SWE	UK	Label	Certifications
1977	Baccara	35	2	1	13	22	1	1	26	RCA Victor	IFPI FIN: 2× Platinum
1978	Light My Fire	—	—	1	—	—	11	10	—	RCA Victor	IFPI FIN: Gold
1979	Colours	—	—	—	—	—	—	—	—	RCA Victor	
1981	Bad Boys	—	—	—	—	—	—	—	—	RCA Victor	

==== Compilation albums ====
- 1978: The Hits of Baccara (RCA Victor)
- 1990: The Original Hits (BMG-Ariola)
- 1991: Star Collection (BMG-Ariola)
- 1993: The Collection (BMG-Ariola)
- 1994: Yes Sir, I Can Boogie (BMG-Ariola)
- 1994: Star Gala (BMG-Ariola/Spectrum)
- 1995: Golden Stars (BMG-Ariola)
- 1998: The Collection (BMG-Ariola)
- 1999: Woman to Woman (BMG-Ariola/Disky Communications)
- 2001: The Best of Baccara – Original Hits (BMG-Ariola/Hot Town Music-Paradiso)
- 2005: The Best of Baccara (Sony BMG/Camden UK)
- 2006: The Very Best of Baccara (Sony BMG)
- 2007: 30th Anniversary (Sony BMG)

==== Singles ====
Year	Title	Peak chart positions										Certifications
Year	Title	AUS	AUT	BEL	GER	IRE	NLD	NOR	SWE	SWI	UK	Certifications
1977	"Yes Sir, I Can Boogie" / "Cara Mia"	9	2	1	1	1	1	1	1	1	1	BPI: Gold; BVMI: Gold
1977	"Sorry, I'm a Lady" / "Love You Till I Die"	96	1	1	1	4	1	1	3	2	8	
1977	"Darling" / "Mad in Madrid"	—	7	14	6	—	17	1	5	9	—	
1977	"Koochie-Koo" / "Number One"	—	—	28	—	—	21	—	—	—	—	
1977	"Granada" / "Sorry, I'm a Lady"	—	—	—	—	—	—	—	—	—	—	
1978	"Parlez-Vous Francais?" / "Amoureux"	—	18	7	21	—	30	—	8	—	—	
1978	"The Devil Sent You to Lorado" / "Somewhere in Paradise"	—	4	18	4	—	—	—	15	5	—	
1979	"Body-Talk" / "By 1999"	—	—	—	26	—	—	—	—	—	—	
1979	"Ay, Ay Sailor" / "One, Two, Three, That's Life"	—	—	—	39	—	—	—	—	—	—	
1979	"Eins Plus Eins Ist Eins" / "For You"	—	—	—	—	—	—	—	—	—	—	
1980	"Sleepy-Time-Toy" / "Candido"	—	—	—	—	—	—	—	—	—	—	
1981	"Colorado" / "Mucho Mucho"	—	—	—	—	—	—	—	—	—	—	
1987	"Call Me Up" (New Baccara)	—	—	—	—	—	—	—	—	—	—	
1999	"Yes Sir, I Can Boogie '99" (Baccara 2000)	—	—	—	—	—	—	—	42	—	—	
2004	"Soy Tu Venus" (Baccara 2000)	—	—	—	—	—	—	—	49	—	—	
2005	"Yes Sir, I Can Boogie 2005" (Baccara)	—	73	—	—	—	—	—	—	—	—	
2021	"Yes Sir, I Can Boogie" (Paul Keenan Remix) (GBX featuring Baccara)	—	—	—	—	—	—	—	—	—	—	

=== Mayte Mateos' Baccara ===
==== Albums ====
- 1994: Our Very Best (Re-recordings plus five new songs)
- 1999: Baccara 2000
- 2004: Soy tu Venus
- 2008: Satin ... In Black & White

==== Maxi singles ====
- 1999: "Yes Sir, I Can Boogie '99"
- 2004: "Soy tu Venus"
- 2008: "Nights in Black Satin"

==== Singles ====
- 1994: "Yes Sir, I Can Boogie" (Italo Disco Mix)
- 1994: "Sorry, I'm a Lady" (Italo Disco Mix)
- 1999: "Yes Sir, I Can Boogie '99"
- 2011: "Christmas Medley" (Radio Edit) [Digital single]
- 2013: "Yes Sir, I Can Boogie 2013" (with Sala & the Strange Sounds)
- 2016: "Dame un Poco de Tu Amor" (with Fundacion Tony Manero)

=== María Mendiola's Baccara / New Baccara ===
==== Albums ====
- 1990: F.U.N.
- 1999: Made in Spain
- 2000: Face to Face
- 2002: Greatest Hits (Re-recordings plus 4 new songs)
- 2006: Singles Collection (Compilation plus 2 new songs)
- 2017: I Belong to Your Heart (11 new songs plus "I Belong to Your Heart" extended and 2017 Fantasy Boy edit)

==== Maxi singles ====
- 1989: "Fantasy Boy"/"Touch Me" (Loading bay Records UK)
- 1989: "Call Me Up"
- 1990: "Yes Sir, I Can Boogie '90"
- 2002: "Wind Beneath My Wings"
- 2005: "Yes Sir, I Can Boogie 2005"
- 2018: "Gimme Your Love" (Bobby To Extended Mix)

==== Singles ====
- 1987: "Call Me Up" / "Talismán"
- 1988: "Fantasy Boy"
- 1989: "Touch Me"
- 1990: "Yes Sir, I Can Boogie '90"
- 1999: "Sorry, I'm a Lady" (Dance Version)
- 2000: "I Want to Be in Love with Somebody"
- 2000: "Face to Face"
- 2002: "Yes Sir, I Can Boogie" (Copa Remix)
- 2005: "Yes Sir, I Can Boogie 2005"
- 2008: "Fantasy Boy 2008" [Digital single]
- 2016: "Yes Sir, I Can Boogie" (Plugin & Baccara) [Digital single]
- 2017: "I Belong to Your Heart"
- 2017: "Super Sexy Baby"
- 2021: "Yes Sir, I Can Boogie" (Paul Keenan Remix)
- 2021: "No Sir, Don't Say Goodbye"

=== Cristina Sevilla's Baccara ===
==== Singles ====
- 2022: "Don't Let This Feeling Go Away" (digital platforms)
- 2023: "When I'm with You" (digital platforms)
- 2024: "Vamos al Cielo" (digital platforms)
- 2025: "The Power of Love" (digital platforms)

==== Maxi singles ====
- 2023: "Don't Let This Feeling Go Away" (with extended versions of "Call Me Up" and "Fantasy Boy")
- 2024: "Vamos al Cielo" / "When I'm with You"

==== Albums ====
- 2025: Evolution

Preceded by Anne-Marie Besse with "Frère Jacques"	Luxembourg in the Eurovision Song Contest; 1978	Succeeded by Jeane Manson with "J'ai déjà vu ça dans tes yeux"
