= Baccara (album) =

Studio album by Baccara
- Released: October 21, 1977
- Recorded: January–August 1977
- Studios: Studio Maschen, Maschen, Germany; Polydor Studios, London
- Genres: Disco; pop
- Length: 42:16
- Label: RCA Victor
- Producer: Rolf Soja

Baccara chronology
Baccara (1977)	Light My Fire (1978)

Alternative cover

Professional ratings
Review scores
Source	Rating
Allmusic	3/5 stars

Baccara is the debut studio album by Spanish duo Baccara, first released on RCA Victor in Germany in 1977. It contains the European hit singles "Yes Sir, I Can Boogie" and "Sorry, I'm a Lady".

The rights to the RCA-Victor back catalogue are currently held by Sony BMG Music Entertainment – the original Baccara album in its entirety remains unreleased on compact disc.

There is an alternative cover for the album from Scandinavia featuring the girls standing with a black background. Some editions of this album feature a limited edition poster. The album was re-released in Germany in 1982 and featured an entirely different picture sleeve.

== Track listing ==
Side A
No.	Title	Writer(s)	Length
1.	"Yes Sir, I Can Boogie"	Frank Dostal, Rolf Soja	4:29
2.	"Love You Till I Die"	Dostal, Soja	4:26
3.	"Granada"	Agustín Lara	4:17
4.	"Gimme More"	Soja, Peter Zentner	3:50
5.	"Koochie-Koo"	Dostal, Soja	4:04

Side B
No.	Title	Writer(s)	Length
6.	"Sorry, I'm a Lady"	Dostal, Soja	3:37
7.	"Cara Mia"	John O'Brien-Docker, Soja	2:53
8.	"Feel Me"	Soja, Zentner	4:20
9.	"Can't Help Falling in Love"	Luigi Creatore, Hugo Peretti, George David Weiss	3:26
10.	"Number One"	Dostal, Soja	2:37
11.	"Don't Play Me a Symphony"	Dostal, Soja	4:17

== Alternative album editions ==
- Additional track Japan and The Netherlands: A6 "Mad In Madrid" (Soja, Dostal) – 3:24.

== Personnel ==
- Mayte Mateos – vocals
- María Mendiola – vocals

== Production ==
- Tracks 1, 4, 5, 6 published by Magazine Music.
- Tracks 2 & 7 published by Cyclus Music.
- Track 3 published by Peermusic.
- Tracks 8–11 published by Intersong.
- Arranged & Produced by Rolf Soja.
- Recorded by Günther Dyke & Günther Zipelius.
- Recorded at Polydor Studio & Studio Maschen.

== Charts ==
Chart (1977–1978)	Peak position
Austrian Albums (Ö3 Austria)	2
Dutch Albums (Album Top 100)	22
Finnish Albums (Suomen virallinen lista)	1
German Albums (Offizielle Top 100)	13
Norwegian Albums (VG-lista)	1
Swedish Albums (Sverigetopplistan)	1
UK Albums (Official Charts)	26

== Certifications and sales ==
Region	Certification	Certified units/sales
Finland (Musiikkituottajat)	2× Platinum	115,000
Norway (IFPI Norway)	Gold	40,000
Sweden	—	322,000
