= Colours (Baccara album) =

Studio album by Baccara
- Released: 1979
- Recorded: 1979
- Genre: Pop; disco
- Label: RCA Victor
- Producer: Rolf Soja

Baccara chronology
The Hits of Baccara (1978)	Colours (1979)	Bad Boys (1981)

Professional ratings
Review scores
Source	Rating
Allmusic	3/5 stars

Colours is the third studio album by Spanish duo Baccara, first released on label RCA-Victor in Germany in 1979. It contains European single releases "Body Talk"/"By 1999" and "Ay Ay Sailor".

The rights to the RCA-Victor back catalogue are currently held by Sony BMG Music Entertainment – the original Colours album in its entirety remains unreleased on compact disc. though it was released on cd in russia, However, all tracks from the album do appear on the German 30th anniversary box set.

"Body Talk"/"By 1999" was released as a 'Special limited edition' 12' single featuring remixed extended versions of both tracks released in Germany. "Ay, Ay Sailor" The first Single issued from the album charted at a 39 in the German charts .

The album cover displays the girls with elaborate painted faces and the back cover features photographs of the girls having their faces painted.

== Track listing ==
=== Side A ===
1. "Ay, Ay Sailor" (Rolf Dostal – Frank Soja) – 3:52
2. "For You" (Rolf Dostal – Frank Soja) – 3:45
3. "One, Two, Three, That's Life" (Rolf Dostal – Frank Soja) – 3:41
4. "I'll Learn to Fly Tonight" (Rolf Soja – Peter Zentner) – 3:29
5. "Boomerang" (Rolf Soja – Peter Zentner) – 3:02

=== Side B ===
1. "Body-Talk" (Frank Dostal – Rolf Soja) – 4:40
2. "Roses in the Snow" (Rolf Soja – Peter Zentner) – 3:55
3. "By 1999 (By Nineteen-Ninety-Nine)" (Frank Dostal – Rolf Soja) – 3:38
4. "Groovy Kinda Lovin'" (Jürgen Schröder – Peter Zentner) – 3:02
5. "Sing Our Love a Lullaby" (Frank Dostal – Rolf Soja) – 3:25

== Personnel ==
- Mayte Mateos – vocals
- María Mendiola – vocals

== Production ==
- Produced and arranged by Rolf Soja.
