= Yes Sir, I Can Boogie =

1977 song by Baccara

Single by Baccara

from the album Baccara
- B-side: "Cara Mia"
- Released: April 1977 (West Germany); November 1977 (Spain)
- Genre: Eurodisco
- Length: 4:37 (album version); 3:15 (single version)
- Label: RCA
- Songwriters: Frank Dostal; Rolf Soja
- Producer: Rolf Soja

Baccara singles chronology
"Yes Sir, I Can Boogie" (1977)	"Sorry, I'm a Lady" (1977)

"Yes Sir, I Can Boogie" is a song by the Spanish disco duo Baccara, released as the first single from their debut studio album Baccara (1977). Written by Frank Dostal and Rolf Soja, and produced by Soja, the song was a hit across Europe and became the duo's sole number one single in the United Kingdom, spending a single week at the top of the UK Singles Chart in October 1977. With 16 million copies worldwide, it is one of the best-selling singles of all time.

Baccara were Spanish flamenco dancers Mayte Mateos and María Mendiola. They were discovered on the island of Fuerteventura in the Canary Islands by RCA Records executive Leon Deane, who saw them dancing flamenco and singing traditional songs for tourists and signed them to the label.

== Other uses ==
- Latvian singer Nora Bumbiere recorded a cover of the song titled in Latvian Es gribu dejot bugi in the 1980s.
- Czech singer Věra Špinarová recorded her cover version Já mám ráda boogie on September 28, 1977.
- Finnish singer Eini had her first hit in Finland with a Finnish-language version called "Yes sir, alkaa polttaa" in 1978.
- British singer Sophie Ellis-Bextor recorded a cover of the song as a bonus track for her second studio album Shoot from the Hip, and released it as the B-side of the single "I Won't Change You". This version would be included in the soundtrack of the 2018 Netflix series The House of Flowers.
- Mexican band La Gusana Ciega covered the track for their 2008 album Jaibol.
- Lola (Chiwetel Ejiofor) performs the song during the closing scene of the 2005 movie Kinky Boots.
- Baccara's version of the song is briefly heard in the 2008 German made-for-TV film Mogadischu, a dramatization of the events surrounding the Lufthansa Flight 181 hijacking.
- In 2014, the song was used in a television advertisement in the United Kingdom for Cadbury Dairy Milk.
- The song was adopted by fans of the Scotland national football team in 2020 following the team's qualification for the UEFA Euro 2020 championships. It had first become notable locally in 2015, due to a stag party video of Aberdeen defender Andrew Considine miming to the song while dressed in drag. Five years later, after Scotland defeated Serbia to reach their first major tournament since 1998, videos of the players (including Considine) chanting the song in celebration after the match went viral on social media. Following the renewed success of the song, one half of Baccara, María Mendiola, said that she would be happy to re-record the song for the people of Scotland. Following renewed popularity, the song re-entered the UK Singles Chart at number 57 on 20 November 2020. In June 2021, Scottish DJ George "GBX" Bowie released a new remixed version of the song for Scottish fans to use as an anthem for UEFA Euro 2020. This dance version included new vocals from Baccara and peaked at number 11 on the UK Singles Chart. The song has since been considered an unofficial anthem of the Scottish national team.
  - Glaswegian band the Fratellis performed a live version of "Yes Sir, I Can Boogie" for their appearance on The Chris Evans Breakfast Show on 26 March 2021. The positive response to their version prompted the band to release a recording of their performance of the song as part of the Charity Boogie Bundle, a special edition digital download of their then-latest album Half Drunk Under a Full Moon, with all profits going to the Tartan Army Children's Charity, Soccer Aid and the Eilidh Brown Memorial Fund. The band also announced plans to record a studio version of their cover with new lyrics, which would be released ahead of the Scotland national football team's opening game at Euro 2020 against the Czech Republic on 14 June 2021. While Mary Dostal and Marie-Luise Soja, widows of the song's writers Frank Dostal and Rolf Soja respectively, endorsed the Fratellis' version of the song and asserted that their late husbands would have also approved, Baccara vocalist María Mendiola was less keen on it, stating that she felt that they made the song sound more like the James Last Orchestra instead of disco. Having said that, Mendiola still considered the Fratellis "fantastic" and would be happy for their version of the song to be successful.
- In 2022, clothing chain store H&M used the song in an advertisement.
- In 2023, It was featured in an episode of The Continental: From the World of John Wick.
- In 2023, it was featured in Sofia Exarchou's feature film Animal.
- In 2023, it featured in the Wicked Little Letters movie trailer for cinema release in 2024.
- In 2024, it featured in the movie about the relationship between Roy Cohn and Donald Trump, The Apprentice.
- In 2026, the song featured in a UK TV advert for the retailer Primark.

== Track listings ==
7" single (Europe & US)

1. "Yes Sir, I Can Boogie" – 4:28
2. "Cara Mia" – 2:53

12" maxi single (US only)

1. "Yes Sir, I Can Boogie" – 6:50
2. "Yes Sir, I Can Boogie" – 6:50

== Charts ==
=== Weekly charts ===
Chart (1977–1978)	Peak position
Australia (Kent Music Report)	9
Austria (Ö3 Austria Top 40)	2
Belgium (Ultratop 50 Flanders)	1
Belgium (Ultratop 50 Wallonia)	1
Belgium (VRT Top 30 Flanders)	1
Denmark (Tracklisten)	1
Europe (Eurochart Hot 100 Singles)	1
Finland (Suomen virallinen lista)	1
France (IFOP)	5
Ireland (IRMA)	1
Italy (Musica e dischi)	13
Netherlands (Dutch Top 40)	1
Netherlands (Single Top 100)	1
New Zealand (Recorded Music NZ)	33
Norway (VG-lista)	1
Spain (AFYVE)	2
Sweden (Sverigetopplistan)	1
Switzerland (Schweizer Hitparade)	1
UK Singles (Official Charts)	1
West Germany (GfK)	1

=== Year-end charts ===
Chart (1977)	Position
Austria (Ö3 Austria Top 40)	4
Belgium (Ultratop Flanders)	10
Netherlands (Dutch Top 40)	6
Netherlands (Single Top 100)	8
Switzerland (Schweizer Hitparade)	5
West Germany (Official German Charts)	3
Chart (1978)	Position
Australia (Kent Music Report)	35

== Certifications and sales ==
Certifications and sales for "Yes Sir, I Can Boogie"
Region	Certification	Certified units/sales
Germany (BVMI)	Gold	700,000
Japan	—	750,000
Norway	—	300,000
Sweden	—	100,000
United Kingdom (BPI)	Gold	500,000^{^}
United Kingdom (BPI) Sales since 2004	Platinum	600,000^{‡}
^{^} Shipments figures based on certification alone.^{‡} Sales+streaming figures based on certification alone.

== See also ==
- List of best-selling singles
- List of best-selling singles in Japan
- List of best-selling singles by country
