= Frank Dostal =

- Born: 16 December 1945; Flensburg, Germany
- Died: 18 April 2017 (aged 71)
- Occupations: songwriter, record producer
- Years active: 1960s–2017

Frank Dostal (16 December 1945 – 18 April 2017) was a German songwriter and music producer. In the late 1960s, he was a singer with the rock band The Rattles, who were consistently successful in Germany, and Wonderland. In the late 1970s, he was a co-writer for the internationally successful vocal duo Baccara.

== Biography ==
Frank Dostal was born in Flensburg and raised in Hamburg. Before taking his Abitur exams, he left school to become a rock singer. With a band called The Faces (not to be confused with the 1970s British band of the same name) he won a talent contest. He joined The Rattles and, in 1968, founded Wonderland with fellow ex-Rattle Achim Reichel. With Wonderland, he sang lead vocals and played bongos, bass guitar and organ. He also wrote the lyrics to Reichel's compositions for the band. The two of them later produced records for children, including "Die große Kinderparty" ("The great children's party").

Later, Dostal devoted himself exclusively to writing lyrics. In the second half of the 1970s, his lyrics frequently appeared on the German Hit parade. He worked for Father Abraham ("Das Lied der Schlümpfe", the German version of "The Smurf Song"), Nana Mouskouri, the Goombay Dance Band and many others.

Dostal came to international fame as a co-writer of songs of the vocal duo Baccara: "Yes Sir, I Can Boogie", "Sorry, I'm a Lady", and "Parlez-vous français?".

Frank Dostal was married to Mary McGlory, a former bass guitar player of Liverpool all-female beat group The Liverbirds. They had two children.
