= Light My Fire (Baccara album) =

Studio album by Baccara
- Released: August 1978 (UK: 1979)
- Recorded: 1977–1978
- Genres: Disco; pop
- Label: RCA Victor
- Producer: Rolf Soja

Baccara chronology
Baccara (1977)	Light My Fire (1978)	The Hits of Baccara (1978)

Professional ratings
Review scores
Source	Rating
Allmusic	3/5 stars

Light My Fire is the second studio album by Spanish duo Baccara, first released on label RCA-Victor in Germany in August 1978. It contains the European hit singles "Darling" and "Parlez-Vous Français?", their entry for the 1978 Eurovision Song Contest. Baccara represented Luxembourg and performed their song in French.

The rights to the RCA-Victor back catalogue are currently held by Sony BMG Music Entertainment – the original Light My Fire album in its entirety remains unreleased on compact disc.

== Track listing ==
=== Side A ===
1. "Baby, Why Don't You Reach Out?" / "Light My Fire" (Peter Zentner, Rolf Soja) / (Jim Morrison, John Densmore, Ray Manzarek, Robby Krieger) (Full-length version) – 11:48
2. "Parlez-vous français?" (French version) (Frank Dostal, Soja, Zentner) – 4:26

=== Side B ===
1. "La Bamba" (Traditional; arranged by María Mendiola and Rolf Soja) – 3:00
2. "My Kisses Need a Cavalier" (Dostal, Soja) – 4:53
3. "Adelita" (Traditional; arranged by María Mendiola and Rolf Soja) – 2:27
4. "Yummy Yummy Yummy" (Joey Levine, Arthur Resnick) – 3:34
5. "Darling" (Full-length version) (Dostal, Soja) – 5:51

== Alternative album editions ==
Same artwork as per German release back cover a new B/W Photo added to the cover & track listing has changed.

=== Side A ===
1. "The Devil Sent You to Lorado" (Dostal – Soja) – 4:07
2. "Baby, Why Don't You Reach Out?" / "Light My Fire" (Zentner – Soja) / (Morrison, Densmore, Manzarek, Krieger) (Edited version) – 4:44
3. "Somewhere in Paradise" (Soja – Zentner) – 4:12
4. "Parlez-vous français?" (English version) (Dostal – Soja – Zentner) – 4:26

=== Side B ===
1. "La Bamba" (Traditional) – 3:00
2. "My Kisses Need a Cavalier" (Dostal – Soja) – 4:53
3. "Adelita" (Traditional) – 2:27
4. "Yummy Yummy Yummy" (Levine – Resnick) – 3:34
5. "Darling" (Full-length version) (Dostal – Soja) – 5:51

== Personnel ==
- Mayte Mateos – vocals
- María Mendiola – vocals

== Production ==
- Produced and arranged by Rolf Soja.
- "La Bamba" and "Adelita" arranged by Mayte Mateos, María Mendiola & Rolf Soja.

== Charts ==
Chart performance for Light My Fire
Chart (1978)	Peak position
Finnish Albums (Suomen virallinen lista)	7
Norwegian Albums (VG-lista)	11
Swedish Albums (Sverigetopplistan)	10

== Certifications ==
Certifications for Light My Fire
Region	Certification	Certified units/sales
Finland (Musiikkituottajat)	Gold	25,000
