= Sorry, I'm a Lady =

Single by Baccara

from the album Baccara
- B-side: "Love You Till I Die"
- Released: 7 August 1977
- Label: RCA
- Songwriters: Rolf Soja & Frank Dostal
- Producer: Rolf Soja

Baccara singles chronology
"Yes Sir, I Can Boogie" (1977)	"Sorry, I'm a Lady" (1977)	"Granada" (1977)

"Sorry, I'm a Lady" is a song co-written by Rolf Soja and Frank Dostal, and performed by Spanish duo Baccara. It was released in 1977 as the second single from their debut album, Baccara (1977). The song was a number one hit in Austria, Belgium, the Netherlands, Norway and West Germany.

== Charts ==
=== Weekly charts ===
Chart (1977)	Peak position
Austria (Ö3 Austria Top 40)	1
Belgium (Ultratop 50 Flanders)	1
Belgium (Ultratop 50 Wallonia)	1
Finland (Suomen virallinen lista)	3
Netherlands (Dutch Top 40)	1
Netherlands (Single Top 100)	1
Norway (VG-lista)	1
Sweden (Sverigetopplistan)	3
Switzerland (Schweizer Hitparade)	2
UK Singles (Official Charts)	8
West Germany (GfK)	1

=== Year-end charts ===
Chart (1977)	Position
Austria (Ö3 Austria Top 40)	18
Belgium (Ultratop Flanders)	16
Netherlands (Dutch Top 40)	30
Netherlands (Single Top 100)	23
Switzerland (Schweizer Hitparade)	14
West Germany (Official German Charts)	31

== Other uses ==
- The duo Frecuencia Mod did a cover of the song in Spanish with the name "Yo Soy Una Dama" in the year 1978.
- Leni released a Finnish language version of the song, "Sorry, Jos Oon Lady" in 1978.
- The song appears in the soundtrack of the 1978 British movie The Stud.
- The song appears in the soundtrack of the 2010 Italian movie Loose Cannons.
