= María Mendiola =

Spanish singer (1952–2021)

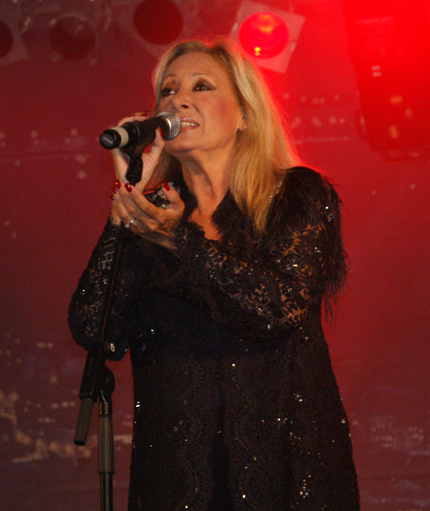
- Mendiola during a performance in Bilbao in 2011

Background information
- Born: María Eugenia Martínez Mendiola; April 4, 1952; Madrid, New Castile, Francoist Spain
- Died: September 11, 2021 (aged 69) Madrid, Community of Madrid, Spain
- Occupations: Singer; dancer; actress
- Years active: 1968–2021
- Labels: RCA; EMI Electrola; CBS; Baby Records; Virgin; Movieplay; Neon; Team 33 Music
- Formerly of: Baccara; New Baccara
- Spouses: Jimmy Lim (divorced); Jan-Erik Olsson (m. 1992)

María Eugenia Martínez Mendiola (April 4, 1952 – September 11, 2021), known as María Mendiola, was a Spanish singer, dancer and actress, who was the creator and founder of the musical duo Baccara together with Mayte Mateos.

== Life and career ==
=== Early life ===
Mendiola's mother, Lola Mendiola, was a housewife; her father, Emilio Martínez, was a police officer at Madrid Airport. From a very young age Mendiola showed interest in the world of dance and trained in her native city, Madrid – taking dance, singing, recitation and interpretation classes. Mendiola studied at an Italian school in Madrid and trained to be a ballet dancer at the national school there, before joining the Spanish state broadcaster's dance troupe. Mendiola made her debut in the flamenco and Spanish dance companies of María Rosa and the legendary Antonio el Bailarín, with whom she toured the world; Mendiola even performed in Japan.

Alberto Portillo, choreographer of the Spanish Radio Television ballet, chose her as the first dancer, and with the other members of the corps de ballet Mendiola was taking part in the most popular Spanish television programs in the early 70s.

=== Baccara (1977–1981) ===
In 1976, assuming that the dancer's life was short professionally, Mendiola proposed to one of her ballet colleagues, Mayte Mateos, to form a musical duo. Inspired by the popular Kessler sisters and with Paco Bermúdez as their representative, the duo Venus was born, debuting under this stage name on Enrique Martí Maqueda's program Palmarès.

After a failed attempt to perform at the "Cancela" venue in Zaragoza, in January 1977 Mendiola asked her husband Jimmy Lim, who was at that time managing the hotel Tres Islas in Fuerteventura, to perform there. That performance was seen by Leon Deane and other executives from the German record label RCA, who happened to stay in the hotel. The duo was invited to Hamburg, and after the test recording in the studio they signed a record deal with RCA. The duo was renamed from Venus to Baccara after the type of dark-red roses.

As a member of Baccara duo, Mendiola recorded hits like "Yes Sir, I Can Boogie", "Cara Mía" and "Sorry, I'm a Lady"; represented Luxembourg in the Eurovision Song Contest 1978 with "Parlez-vous français ?", and entered in the Guinness Book of Records as the female musical duo with the highest number of sales with a single. Baccara was acclaimed worldwide and recognised for what the Baccara concept brings to the world of entertainment: two young girls, one in white and the other in black, who combine music with dance, always with a touch of sophistication and elegance.

After four years together and four albums released, the original line-up of the duo, created by María Mendiola broke up in 1981. From that moment on, each of the members of the original duo tried to launch their solo-careers – but without much success; and later each created their own line-ups of Baccara, with new stage companions.

=== Solo career ===
As a solo-singer, Mendiola recorded the album Born Again with singles such as "Sugar Boom Boom", "I Wanna See the World", "Stupid Cupid" (cover of a Neil Sedaka song) and followed the tendencies of the early '80s with "Aerobic".

When Fernando García de la Vega was preparing the series La Comedia Musical Española for RTVE and Mendiola was invited to be part of four of the musical episodes in the series; Las Leandras with Paloma San Basilio, Róbame Esta Noche with María José Cantudo, Luna de Miel en El Cairo with Teresa Rabal, and El Sobre Verde.

For her work in La Comedia Musical Española Mendiola received a Premios Revelación in the television category, at a gala organized by the Vanity nightclub. María José Cantudo, who had met Mendiola in the Fernando García de la Vega series, invited her to be part of the cast of the musical show, "Doña Mariquita de mi Corazón", authentic success of the 1985 theater season in Madrid at the Teatro Calderón.

=== Return to Baccara ===
It is at this moment when Mendiola decided to re-create the duo that she founded at the end of the seventies, and for this new line-up she invited an old colleague from the RTVE ballet; Maryse Pérez. The duo was named New Baccara and its first appearance before the media took place at the Theater La Latina, owned by Lina Morgan. For their debut, Mendiola and Pérez released the songs Esta Noche No and Cuerpo, Alma y Corazón. Mendiola and Perez re-entered the charts thanks to the hit Call Me Up – written by Ian Cussick, produced by Luis Rodríguez. Mendiola wrote the lyrics for the Spanish version of this song, entitled Talisman. "New Baccara" released three dance-singles, that brought the duo back to the charts. Together with Pérez and during the 25 years they worked together, Mendiola released several albums: F.U.N (1990), Made in Spain (1999), Face to Face (2000), Greatest Hits for Universal in 2002 and Singles Collection with Divucsa in 2006.

Pérez had to leave the duo due to a health problem that prevented her from dancing; and Mendiola chose the Madrid-native singer Cristina Sevilla as a stage partner. Together with Sevilla, Mendiola worked her last twelve years of professional life, and the duo continued to perform all over the world. On the occasion of the 40th anniversary of the original formation they released the album I Belong To Your Heart, produced by Luis Rodríguez for the Team 33 record label.

In November 2020, Yes Sir, I Can Boogie returned to the UK charts thanks to the Scottish football team and in particular one of its players, Andy Considine. For that reason, Mendiola received a lot of interview requests from the British media – and she gave a lot of interviews for the most prominent tabloids, radio and television stations, including BBC.

As a consequence, the main hit of Baccara was re-recorded by Mendiola and Sevilla – and released together with Scottish DJ George "GBX" Bowie. In 2021 the single No Sir, Don't Say Goodbye was released by Team 33.

=== Private life ===
From her first marriage with Jimmy Lim, Mendiola had a son, Jaime Emilio Lim Martínez, who is now the owner and director of Higher School of Music in Madrid. One of the auditoriums in that educational institution now bears the name of María Mendiola.

Mendiola's second marriage, that lasted nearly 3 decades, was to Swedish businessman Jan-Erik Olsson, whom she met on an airplane in May 1991.

=== Death ===
On September 11, 2021, Mendiola died at the age of 69. Many media organisations published obituaries, such as The New York Times who stated, regarding the cause of death, that "she had been dealing with a blood deficiency for two decades".

== Discography ==
Album

- 1981: Born Again (EMI Electrola – Germany; CBS – Spain; Baby Records – Netherlands)

Singles

- 1981: "Higher and Higher" / "Luxury Life" (EMI Electrola – 1C 006-64 555) (Germany)
- 1982: "Sugar Boom Boom" / "Hungry for Love" (CBS – CBS A-2268) (Spain)
- 1982: "Sugar Boom Boom" / "(When They Believed) They Were an Angel" (Baby Records – BR-1468) (Netherlands)
- 1982: "I Wanna See the World" / "(When They Believed) They Were an Angel" (EMI Electrola – 1C 006-46 549) (Germany)
- 1982: "I Wanna See the World" / "Caribamerica" (CBS – A-2763) (Spain)
- 1982: "I Wanna See the World" / "Born Again" (Baby Records – BR 50.003) (Netherlands)
- 1983: "Stupid Cupid" / "Hit on the Radio" (Virgin – 105 783-100) (Europe)
- 1983: "Stupid Cupid" / "The Time of Your Life" (Movieplay – 02.3690/0) (Spain)
- 1983: "Stupid Cupid" / "Hit on the Radio" (Baby Records – BR 50304) (Italy)
- 1983: "Aerobic (Gets Your Body Fit)" / "Aerobic (Sigue Sin Parar)" (Movieplay – 02.3620/9) (Spain)

Maxi singles

- 1983: "Stupid Cupid" / "Hit on the Radio" (Virgin – 600 979-213) (Germany)
- 1983: "Stupid Cupid" / "Hit on the Radio" (Neon – N1245005) (France)
- 1983: "Stupid Cupid" / "The Time of Your Life" (Movieplay – 05.3690/3) (Spain)
- 1983: "Aerobic (Gets Your Body Fit)" / "Aerobic (Sigue Sin Parar)" (Movieplay – 05.3620/2) (Spain)

Appearances (compilations)

- 1981: Single News 9'81 – Higher and Higher (EMI Electrola – P 518 108) (Germany)
- 1982: Single News 3'82 – I Wanna See the World (EMI Electrola – P 518 203) (Germany)
- 1982: Un Verano Caliente CBS 1982 – Sugar Boom Boom (CBS) (Spain)
- 1983: Die Neue Ronny's Pop Show – Stupid Cupid (CBS – 24025) (Germany)
- 1983: Movie Dance – Especial Disco – Stupid Cupid (Movieplay – 17.3695/8) (Spain)
- 1983: Fascination (16 Hits of Today) – Stupid Cupid (Virgin – 40 143 0) (Germany)
- 1985: Paloma San Basilio – Las Leandras (tracks: A4, B1, B4, B5) (Hispavox – 160 340) (Spain)
- 1985: María José Cantudo – Robame Esta Noche (Hispavox – 160 341) (Spain)
- 1985: Teresa Rabal – Luna De Miel En El Cairo (tracks: A1, A2, A4, B3) (Hispavox – 0602 160 348) (Spain)

== Filmography ==
Television:

- 1975/1976: La hora de...
- 1975: Felices Pascuas
- 1975/1976: Especial Nochebuena
- 1982/1983: Estudio Abierto
- 1985: La Comedia Musical Española "Las leandras", "Luna de Miel en El Cairo", "Róbame esta noche", "El sobre verde"
- 1986: Un, dos, tres... responda otra vez "La oficina siniestra"
- 1995/1996: La Revista "Si fausto fuera faustina", "La de los ojos en blanco"
