= UK Eurovision Song Contest entries discography =

This is a discography of the United Kingdom entries for the Eurovision Song Contest, featuring the highest chart placing attained on the UK Singles Chart.

== 1957–1969 ==
Year	Single	Artist	UK Chart peak	Year End Chart	Label	Album
1957	"All"	Patricia Bredin	NR (Note: Not released as a single or on an album (barring compilation albums))		—N/a	Non-album single
1959	"Sing Little Birdie"	Pearl Carr & Teddy Johnson	12	87	Columbia	Non-album single
1960	"Looking High, High, High"	Bryan Johnson	20	—	Decca	Non-album single
1961	"Are You Sure?"	The Allisons	2	8	Fontana	Non-album single
1962	"Ring-A-Ding Girl"	Ronnie Carroll	46	—	Philips	Non-album single
1963	"Say Wonderful Things"	Ronnie Carroll	6	65	Philips	Non-album single
1964	"I Love the Little Things"	Matt Monro	—	—	Parlophone	Non-album single
1965	"I Belong"	Kathy Kirby	36	—	Decca	Non-album single
1966	"A Man Without Love"	Kenneth McKellar	30	—	Decca	Non-album single
1967	"Puppet on a String"	Sandie Shaw	1	6	Pye	Non-album single
1968	"Congratulations"	Cliff Richard	1	19	Columbia	Non-album single
1969	"Boom Bang-a-Bang"	Lulu	2	44	Columbia	Non-album single
"—" denotes a recording that did not chart.

== 1970–1989 ==
Year	Single	Artist	UK Chart peak	Year End Chart	Label	Album
1970	"Knock, Knock Who's There?"	Mary Hopkin	2	36	Apple	Non-album single
1971	"Jack in the Box"	Clodagh Rodgers	4	73	RCA	Rodgers & Heart
1972	"Beg, Steal or Borrow"	The New Seekers	2	14	Polydor	We'd Like to Teach the World to Sing
1973	"Power to All Our Friends"	Cliff Richard	4	46	EMI	Non-album single
1974	"Long Live Love"	Olivia Newton-John	11	—	Pye International	Long Live Love
1975	"Let Me Be the One"	The Shadows	12	—	EMI	Specs Appeal
1976	"Save Your Kisses for Me"	Brotherhood of Man	1	1	Pye	Love and Kisses
1977	"Rock Bottom"	Lynsey de Paul & Mike Moran	19	—	Polydor	Non-album single
1978	"The Bad Old Days"	Co-Co	13	—	Ariola / Hansa	Bad Old Days
1979	"Mary Ann"	Black Lace	42	—	EMI	Non-album single
1980	"Love Enough for Two"	Prima Donna	48	—	Ariola	Non-album single
1981	"Making Your Mind Up"	Bucks Fizz	1	7	RCA	Bucks Fizz
1982	"One Step Further"	Bardo	2	79	Epic	Non-album single
1983	"I'm Never Giving Up"	Sweet Dreams	21	—	Ariola	Non-album single
1984	"Love Games"	Belle and the Devotions	11	—	CBS	Non-album single
1985	"Love Is"	Vikki	49	—	PRT	Non-album single
1986	"Runner in the Night"	Ryder	98	—	10	Non-album single
1987	"Only the Light"	Rikki	96	—	OK	Only the Light
1988	"Go"	Scott Fitzgerald	52	—	PRT	Non-album single
1989	"Why Do I Always Get it Wrong?"	Live Report	73	—	Brouhaha	Non-album single
"—" denotes a recording that did not chart.

== 1990–2009 ==
Year	Single	Artist	UK Chart peak	Year End Chart	Label	Album
1990	"Give a Little Love Back to the World"	Emma	33	—	Big Wave	Non-album single
1991	"A Message to Your Heart"	Samantha Janus	30	—	Hollywood	Non-album single
1992	"One Step Out of Time"	Michael Ball	20	—	Polydor	Michael Ball
1993	"Better the Devil You Know"	Sonia	15	—	Arista	Better the Devil You Know
1994	"Lonely Symphony (We Will Be Free)"	Frances Ruffelle	25	—	Virgin	Fragile
1995	"Love City Groove"	Love City Groove	7	78	Planet 3	Hard Times
1996	"Ooh Aah...Just a Little Bit"	Gina G	1	4	Warner Music	Fresh!
1997	"Love Shine a Light"	Katrina and the Waves	3	64	Warner Music	Walk on Water
1998	"Where Are You?"	Imaani	15	—	EMI	Non-album single
1999	"Say It Again"	Precious	6	—	EMI	Precious
2000	"Don't Play That Song Again"	Nicki French	34	—	RCA	Non-album single
2001	"No Dream Impossible"	Lindsay Dracass	32	—	Universal	Non-album single
2002	"Come Back"	Jessica Garlick	13	—	Columbia	Non-album single
2003	"Cry Baby"	Jemini	15	—	Integral	Non-album single
2004	"Hold On to Our Love"	James Fox	13	—	Sony Music	Non-album single
2005	"Touch My Fire"	Javine	18	—	Island	Non-album single
2006	"Teenage Life"	Daz Sampson	8	—	Sony / BMG	Non-album single
2007	"Flying the Flag (For You)"	Scooch	5	—	Warner Music	Non-album single
2008	"Even If"	Andy Abraham	67	—	B-Line	Even If
2009	"It's My Time"	Jade Ewen	27	—	Polydor	Non-album single
"—" denotes a recording that did not chart.

== 2010–present ==
Year	Single	Artist	UK Chart peak	Year End Chart	Label	Album
2010	"That Sounds Good to Me"	Josh Dubovie	179	—	Saw Productions	Non-album single
2011	"I Can"	Blue	16	—	Blueworld	Roulette
2012	"Love Will Set You Free"	Engelbert Humperdinck	60	—	Conehead UK	Release Me - The Best Of Engelbert Humperdinck
2013	"Believe in Me"	Bonnie Tyler	93	—	ZYX Music	Rocks and Honey
2014	"Children of the Universe"	Molly	23	—	East West	Non-album single
2015	"Still in Love with You"	Electro Velvet	114	—	Right Track Records	Non-album single
2016	"You're Not Alone"	Joe and Jake	81	—	Sony Music	Non-album single
2017	"Never Give Up on You"	Lucie Jones	73	—	ArtPeople	Non-album single
2018	"Storm"	SuRie	50	—	MMP	Non-album single
2019	"Bigger than Us"	Michael Rice	– (Note: "Bigger than Us" charted at 35 in the Scottish Singles Chart and at 27 in the UK Singles Downloads Chart.)	—	Spinnup	Non-album single
2020	"My Last Breath"	James Newman	– (Note: "My Last Breath" charted at 23 in the Scottish Singles Chart and in the UK Singles Downloads Chart.)	—	BMG	The Things We Do (EP)
2021	"Embers"	James Newman	47	—	BMG	Non-album single
2022	"Space Man"	Sam Ryder	2	66	Parlophone	There's Nothing but Space, Man!
2023	"I Wrote a Song"	Mae Muller	9	—	Universal/Capitol/EMI	Sorry I'm Late
2024	"Dizzy"	Olly Alexander	42	—	Polydor	Polari
2025	"What the Hell Just Happened?"	Remember Monday	31	—	The Other Songs	Non-album single
2026	"Eins, zwei, drei"	Look Mum No Computer	83	—	Look Mum No Label	Non-album single
"—" denotes a recording that did not chart.

== See also ==
- UK national selection for the Eurovision Song Contest
- List of contestants from the UK national selection for the Eurovision Song Contest
