= UK national selection for the Eurovision Song Contest =

BBC television show

Eurovision: You Decide (Note: Previously Festival of British Popular Songs, Eurovision Song Contest British Final, A Song for Europe, The Great British Song Contest, Eurovision: Making Your Mind Up, Eurovision: Your Decision, and Eurovision: Your Country Needs You)
- Logo for the fourth edition of You Decide, the most recent edition of the national final.
- Genre: Music, entertainment
- Created by: BBC Studios
- Directed by: Richard Valentine (2004–2006, 2018); Helen Spencer (2009); Nikki Parsons (2009); Tim van Someren (2010); Simon Staffurth (2016–2017, 2019)
- Presented by: see list of presenters
- Starring: See list of contestants
- Judges: See below
- Country of origin: United Kingdom
- Original language: English

Production
- Executive producers: Kevin Bishop (2007–2008); Clare Pizey, Moira Ross, Martin Scott (2009); Phil Parsons (2008, 2010); Guy Freeman (2016–2018); Mel Balac (2019)
- Producers: Dominic Smith (2004–2007); Helen Tumbridge (2008, 2010); Kate Maddigan (2009); Helen Riddell (2016–2018); Lee Smithurst (2019)
- Production locations: The O2 Forum (2016); Hammersmith Apollo (2017); Brighton Dome (2018); Dock10 (2019)
- Running time: 10–90 minutes

Original release
- Network: BBC One (1957–2010) (Note: Except on two occasions. In 1977 it was not televised, due to industrial action by BBC cameramen and technicians minutes before the show went live. A recording of the contest was transmitted a few hours later on BBC Radio 2. The 1979 edition of A Song for Europe did not take place, it was abandoned due to a strike by BBC sound engineers.); BBC Radio 2 (TV final: 1977, 1986–1995; (Note: BBC Radio 2 did not broadcast the A Song for Europe result shows from 1991 to 1995.) semi-finals, 1997–2003)
- Release: 22 January 1957 – 4 March 2010
- Network: BBC Red Button (Note: The announcement of the internally selected artist and song was revealed in a special programme broadcast via the BBC Red Button service where they were interviewed by host Scott Mills.)
- Release: 3 March 2014 – 7 March 2015
- Network: BBC Four (2016); BBC Two (2017–2019)
- Release: 26 February 2016 – 8 February 2019

Related
- Eurovision Song Contest Previews (1971–1994, 2002–2004); Wogan (1985–1992); A Song for Europe Preview (1993–1994); Top of the Pops (1995–1996, 1999, 2004); Live & Kicking (1996); The National Lottery Live (1997–1998)

Eurovision: You Decide is the most recent name of a BBC television programme that was broadcast annually to select the United Kingdom's entry for the Eurovision Song Contest. The show had previously gone under several other names, including Festival of British Popular Songs (1957), Eurovision Song Contest British Final (1959–1960), The Great British Song Contest (1996–1999), Eurovision: Making Your Mind Up (2004–2007), Eurovision: Your Decision (2008), and Eurovision: Your Country Needs You (2009–2010), but was known, for most of its history, as A Song for Europe (1961–1995, 2000–2003).

The selection process, originally broadcast on BBC One, has varied between selecting both the performer and song, or just the song in some years, and has been hosted by a variety of presenters over the years. For most years the public has been able to vote for the winner, in the past with postcard voting, where the viewers sent postcards with their vote to the BBC, but more recently televoting and online. In 2009 and 2010, the singer was chosen by a public vote and the song internally selected.

The most recent name and format, Eurovision: You Decide, was adopted in 2016, as between 2011 and 2015 the UK representative had been internally selected by the BBC, resulting in the televised selection show being suspended. The 2016 edition of You Decide was broadcast on BBC Four, while the You Decide editions between 2017 and 2019 were aired on BBC Two. In September 2019, the You Decide format was dropped in favour of a return to the internal selection method, in which BBC Studios partners with a music company (BMG in 2020 and 2021, and TaP in 2022 and 2023) to select and produce its entry. The internal selection process continues to be used as of 2026.

== History ==
=== Early days ===
The format of the show and the manner in which the winner is chosen has gone through many mutations. In its early days, there was a round of televised semi-finals, with the winner chosen by regional juries situated across the country. This format was used until 1960. During this era the show was known as the "Festival of British Popular Songs" (1957) and "Eurovision Song Contest British Finals" (1959 and 1960).

In 1961 the show became known by its more familiar title, "A Song For Europe", with regional juries once more deciding the winner. Typically, during that period, singers would be invited by the BBC to choose and perform a song that they liked from the shortlist available. Household names such as Petula Clark, Lita Roza, Anne Shelton, Frank Ifield, Ronnie Hilton and David Hughes were amongst the contenders for the UK competition, none of whom were able to secure the much cherished ticket to the Eurovision final. In the early 1960s, record companies became involved in the selection process for the first time and submitted songs by their artists. This produced hits for Craig Douglas, Karl Denver, Jackie Lee, Kenny Lynch, Vince Hill and Ricky Valance, but again, none of them were selected to go forward to the Eurovision Song Contest final itself.

From 1964 up until 1975, an artist would be chosen by the BBC, and that artist would sing all six songs (five in 1966 and 1967) in the selection, and the public (bar 1964 and 1971) would choose by postcard which song they would like to represent them in the contest. Regional juries selected the winner in 1964. A postal strike in 1971 prevented the ballot from taking place, so regional juries were once again constructed to pick the winner. In 1972, national power cuts meant that the broadcast of the show was blacked out in many areas, leading to a much lower postal vote. In its early days of this format, only "light entertainment" singers were used, such as Kenneth McKellar and Kathy Kirby. However, the poor showing of McKellar in Luxembourg (he placed 9th of 18 entries with scores from only 2 countries, including top marks from Ireland) prompted the BBC to use more mainstream pop stars, which led to a run of successful results for the UK. This idea was dropped due to the low number of postal votes cast in the contest of 1975, in which all six songs were performed by The Shadows, and after objections from songwriters who felt The Shadows, and the BBC's selections in general, were not the sort of artists they wanted to represent their music.

After 1964, the "Song For Europe" selection process was incorporated into other BBC light entertainment shows, in addition to the songs being broadcast on BBC Radio programmes. Typically, the performer would sing one song a week either on their own series or as a guest on another regular BBC TV show, more often than not, televised on Saturdays. This culminated with the performer singing all the songs one after another in a special edition of the given show. From 1968 to 1975, these performances were then immediately repeated before viewers were asked to cast their votes by mail. The following week, the winning song would be announced and performed once more, although there was a two-week wait in 1965.

In 1968, Cliff Richard performed the songs only in a special edition of Cilla Black's eponymous TV series (broadcast on Tuesdays), without having sung them weekly beforehand. The various shows chosen for the "Song For Europe" performances were The Kathy Kirby Show (1965 shown on Fridays), Kenneth McKellar's A Song For Everyone (1966 shown on Thursdays), The Rolf Harris Show (1967), Cilla (1968 and 1973), Lulu (1969 and 1975), It's Cliff Richard! (1970, 1971 and 1972) and Clunk, Click... As It Happens (1974) – when in a break with the format, Olivia Newton-John performed three songs a week for two weeks rather than one a week for six weeks. Originally, Cilla Black's 1974 nine-part BBC series was also scheduled to feature the 'Song for Europe' process, but Black was uncomfortable at promoting another female singer (Newton-John) each week throughout the series' run and in a rather last minute decision, the BBC arranged to move the process to another show, necessitating the contracted process.

This period was highly successful for the UK in the Eurovision Song Contest. Author and historian John Kennedy O'Connor notes in his book The Eurovision Song Contest – The Official History, that every UK entry to the contest from 1967 to 1977 finished in the top four, with only three songs not being first or second. Indeed, the UK were only 7 points short of four consecutive victories from 1967 to 1970.

=== 1970s and 1980s ===
In 1976, the method used from 1961 – 1963 was reinstated. Twelve songs were performed by artists chosen by the songwriters themselves and the winner was chosen by regional juries across the country during a stand-alone show called "A Song For Europe". This system produced an immediate success by choosing the song which went on to be the Eurovision winner that year, "Save Your Kisses for Me" by Brotherhood of Man. The first few years of the revamped format also saw a plethora of well-known names take part in the competition. Frank Ifield, Tammy Jones, Sweet Sensation, Lyn Paul, Tony Monopoly, Carl Wayne, Hazell Dean, Tony Christie, The Foundations, Labi Siffre, Guys 'n' Dolls, The Nolan Sisters, Polly Brown and Sweet Dreams all took part in the competition, but none were successful. Likewise, the first two winners of the contest, Brotherhood of Man and Lynsey de Paul & Mike Moran, had many hits under their belts before attempting Eurovision.

In 1977, a strike by BBC cameramen led to the contest being blacked out on TV, although the show went ahead and the audio portion was later broadcast on BBC Radio 2. The TV programme has never been broadcast and is not listed in the BBC archives, yet it was transmitted to the various regional juries in BBC studios around the country, in order for them to cast their votes. The 1979 "A Song For Europe" final was never held at all, due to a strike by BBC sound engineers. The juries had to judge using audio recordings of the rehearsals. The songs were presented to the public on Terry Wogan's radio show the following day, after the result was known, followed later in the day with a spot on the TV magazine show Nationwide, where the top 5 were revealed and the winners, Black Lace, were interviewed as guests on the show. As a result of this industrial action, all future contests were staged at BBC studios and not as outside broadcasts from venues.

The 1980 result ended in a tie between Prima Donna's "Love Enough for Two" and Maggie Moone's "Happy Everything". To resolve this, in an unrehearsed panic, host Terry Wogan called back the juries to announce their favourite of the two songs. This led to extreme confusion when the scoreboard failed to keep up and some juries contradicted the results they had given earlier. Prima Donna won, with eight juries to Maggie Moone's six. A detailed check of the votes after the show did confirm that Prima Donna were the correct winners. Prima Donna were the first winners of the competition specifically formed to take part in Eurovision. This became the norm in the 1980s and the artists taking part in the contest became more and more obscure and amateurish. However, a few notable acts did enter the contest in the 1980s, with scant success. Liquid Gold, Alvin Stardust, Sinitta and Hazell Dean all failed to come through the heats.

By 1981, the number of songs had dropped to eight, and interest had started to wane. Four out of eight songs in both the 1982 and 1984 events were written by Paul Curtis, who was responsible for the 1984 winner; "Love Games". Following Belle & The Devotions' performance at the 1984 Eurovision contest in Luxembourg, the audience audibly booed them from the stage in an orchestrated demonstration against the song's supposed plagiarism, and by the local audience retaliating against a particularly shocking violent attack by English soccer fans. For 1985, the BBC wanted to revert to having one singer of their choice perform all the short listed songs and approached Bonnie Tyler and when she was unavailable, Lena Zavaroni for the task. However, the Music Publisher's Association blocked the move, wanting their members the choice of their own singers to represent their music. A compromise was reached and only solo artists or duets – no "made for Eurovision" acts – were permitted to take part in the 1985 UK selection process and limited two entries per songwriter. Despite this rule, both songs submitted by Paul Curtis reached the final eight. They reverted to allowing all-comers for 1986. Starting in 1985, the songs were also 'previewed' on Terry Wogan's prime time chat show on BBC1 ahead of the final. When the series ended in 1992, the songs were presented in 1993 and 1994 in stand-alone programmes, hosted by Wogan.

The number of entries briefly increased to ten in 1987 when record companies were invited to submit songs, but after a poor result from Rikki in the Eurovision final of 1987, the regional juries were disbanded, and the final decision given to the public through telephone voting, with a celebrity panel offering comments on the entries intended to guide viewers. This proved to be a relative success, accruing two second places and a sixth place (Zagreb, 1990). However, a disappointing 10th place in Rome obtained by Samantha Janus led the BBC to rethink the standard of performers in the competition.

=== 1990s ===
As a result of the disappointing results in 1990 and 1991, the system that was used between 1964 and 1975 was resurrected, with the BBC's head of light entertainment, Jim Moir choosing one artist to perform all the songs in the UK final.West End singer Michael Ball was the first option in 1992, and went on to win second place. Sonia Evans was also second the following year. However, after a suggestion by Don Black to the BBC's new head of light entertainment David Liddiment in 1994, Tony Award winning stage star Frances Ruffelle was offered the job of representing the UK. A virtually unknown singer, meant that interest was low. Her final position in the Eurovision Song Contest held in Dublin was a disappointing tenth, the same achieved by Samantha Janus in 1991.

A dramatic modernisation was introduced in 1995 in an attempt to boost the profile of the contest. Jonathan King was drafted in as Executive Producer to make the event more modern. The 1995 event had a diverse range of songs and some relatively well-known acts performing, such as Londonbeat who had a hit with "I've Been Thinking About You", pop-combo Deuce and Sox, which featured singer and former Page 3 model Samantha Fox. All songs were presented on a special edition of Top of the Pops prior to the live final. On the night, the well-known artists were all beaten by rap act Love City Groove, whose eponymous song could only manage a disappointing tenth in Dublin that year. On a positive note, the songs by Love City Groove and Deuce ("I Need You") made the top 10 in the UK singles charts, reaching #7 and #10 respectively, while three other entries – Dear Jon "One Gift of Love" at #68, Londonbeat "I'm Just Your Puppet on A... (String!)" at #55 and Sox "Go for the Heart" at #47 – all reached the UK top 100.

In 1996, a semi-final was reintroduced for the first time since 1960 and the show's name was changed to The Great British Song Contest. All eight songs were performed on Top of the Pops on 1 March, and the public voted to decide the four finalists. The results were announced the following day, but there was no information given on who finished where. On 8 March the final was held, with Gina G winning very easily with her dance number "Ooh Aah... Just A Little Bit". The song became an instant hit in the charts, reaching Number 1 on the UK Singles Chart. It was the first UK non-winner to do so since 1968 but it was not as successful in the Eurovision Contest itself. In Oslo, Gina could only manage eighth place, but was perhaps consoled by her Europe-wide hit with the song, which also became one of the few Eurovision songs, and one of the relatively few dance songs, to be a major hit in the United States where it peaked at #12 on the Billboard Hot 100, was #1 on their Dance Chart and earned a Grammy nomination for Best Dance Recording.

Jonathan King resigned, certain that, if Gina G could not win, nothing he selected could, but the BBC persuaded him to stay in charge and he decided to retain the same formula again, but with an added twist. All eight contestants would be heard on Ken Bruce's radio show on BBC Radio 2, with a public vote to decide the four finalists. The four would perform on The National Lottery Live until 1998, and then on Top of the Pops in 1999. The final itself would just consist of repeats of the performances made in the above shows, in a special programme on a Sunday afternoon. King persuaded his friends Katrina and Kimberley Rew, who had hit with "Walking on Sunshine", to enter a new track, "Love Shine A Light". This produced a win in the Eurovision Contest itself for the United Kingdom and for Katrina and the Waves in 1997, and followed with a second place for Imaani in 1998, but disappointment in 1999 for the all-female band Precious.

=== 2000s ===
In 2000, the same format continued, but the final four songs were performed live in A Song For Europe, still shunted to a graveyard Sunday afternoon slot. The result proved disappointing. Nicki French gave what author John Kennedy O'Connor describes in his book The Eurovision Song Contest – The Official History as a far from strong performance, despite her previous chart success and attained the UK's worst ever placing at the time, a mere 16th in Stockholm with "Don't Play That Song Again". This format continued the following year, and another poor showing for the UK. Lindsay D only got one place higher in Copenhagen. The entries from Six Chix in 2000 and Luke Galliana, the latter of which did not make the 2001 final, became minor hits, with Galliana just failing to make the Top 40, but becoming a popular hit on cable request line music channel The Box.

The 2002 A Song For Europe generated a lot of publicity, because three of the four acts that made the final were relatively well known to TV viewers, albeit not necessarily for their singing ability. Surf 'n' Turf included Jonathan Maitland who is a TV presenter of consumer advice shows such as Watchdog and House of Horrors. Tricia Penrose is an actress who played Gina in the 60s retro drama Heartbeat on ITV, and Jessica Garlick had made the final stages of another ITV show Pop Idol. The standard of songs was stronger than previous years, and Jessica Garlick had a runaway victory of nearly 70,000 votes with her ballad "Come Back". The song was also a success in Eurovision with it finishing joint third with host country Estonia.

2003 saw terrible disappointment. The new voting system of regional televoting, where 9, 10 and 12 points were awarded to the top three songs, led to an unsuccessful winner. Jemini's "Cry Baby" won by four points over "Help Me" by Emily Reed. Confidence in the UK entry was low for both fans and the public, and in the actual contest held in Riga, Jemini picked up the UK's worst-ever showing, scoring "nul points" and finishing last, due to a very poor performance, although some reports attempted to blame European disapproval of the US-UK invasion of Iraq for the failure of any nation to give the UK even one point. As noted by author John Kennedy O'Connor, with 26 entries in the Eurovision field, this made "Cry Baby" the least successful song in the entire history of the contest. No song in the Eurovision final scored "nul points" again until 2015.

Making Your Mind Up logo (2004–2006)

The 2004 selection was completely different and had a hugely increased budget. Gone was the Song For Europe name, replaced with Making Your Mind Up. The radio semi-final was also gone, although the songs were presented on a regular edition of Top of the Pops two weeks prior to the live final. The six songs were performed live in a prime time Saturday night show hosted by Terry Wogan and Gaby Roslin with additional programmes on BBC Three hosted by Paddy O'Connell and Lorraine Kelly. Last year's ESC winner Sertab Erener performed "Everyway That I Can" to open the show. This raised the profile of the competition, although there was criticism of the fact that four of the six acts were from reality TV shows. The winner, chosen by 70% regional televoting (regions awarding 0,2,4,6,8 and 12 points) and 30% SMS and Interactive voting, was James Fox, who had finished fifth in the second series of Fame Academy, with a gentle ballad "Hold on To Our Love", written by Gary Miller and Tim Woodcock. Viewing figures were peaked at over 7 million for the results show. The song finished 16th at the contest in Istanbul.

For 2005, six songs dropped to five, and the show was moved to an early Saturday evening slot on 5 March, to avoid a clash with Comic Relief Does Fame Academy; and Natasha Kaplinsky replaced Gaby Roslin as co-host with Sir Terry Wogan. The press focused on two performers. Javine Hylton who is a relatively well-known urban singer, and Katie Price, aka Jordan, a famous glamour model. The other contestants included former 3SL bandmember Andy Scott-Lee, the 1996 British Eurovision entry Gina G and unknown opera trio Tricolore. The voting itself was the same format as the previous year, but this time an online jury was added to decide between the contestants to take account of the views of those watching in the rest of Europe to get a sense of how the songs would fare at the Contest. After an exciting voting sequence, Javine came out on top with her ethno-urban song "Touch My Fire", although she also caused some controversy when she briefly fell out of her top during an energetic dance routine. At the 50th Eurovision Song Contest held in Kyiv, Javine finished 22nd out of 24 participants in the final, the UK's second poorest finish ever.

In February 2006 it was announced that artists competing in the 2006 contest would include Kym Marsh and Antony Costa, both relatively well known in the UK for their past involvement with music bands (the former appearing in Hear'say and the latter in boy band Blue). Following the format of the previous year (and with six songs this time), Making Your Mind Up returned in 2006 in a prime-time Saturday evening slot, and was broadcast on 4 March on BBC One. Terry Wogan and Natasha Kaplinsky once again presented and were accompanied by a 'Celebrity Jury' that included chat-show host Jonathan Ross, pop star Kelly Osbourne and Top of the Pops presenter Fearne Cotton. The eventual winner of the 2006 contest (after the 7 tele-juries from around the UK and mobile and web votes) was Daz Sampson and his song "Teenage Life". Although it brought another disappointing result for the United Kingdom, with Daz finishing 19th in the contest out of 24 competing countries, the following week his single reached Number 8 in the UK charts.

During a press conference on 28 February 2007, the BBC confirmed that the artists taking part in Making Your Mind Up would include Big Brovaz, an RnB group who had 4 UK Top 10 singles in 2002–2003, Brian Harvey, a former member of the boy band East 17; Cyndi; Justin Hawkins of The Darkness, performing a duet with Beverlei Brown; Liz McClarnon, formerly of girl group Atomic Kitten; and Scooch, the eventual winners with "Flying the Flag (for You)". Scooch sang their entry in the Eurovision Song Contest 2007 on 12 May 2007 in Helsinki, Finland and finished in second-to-last place with 19 points, ahead of Ireland who placed last.

For the first time, the show was filmed at The Maidstone Studios in Kent. The hour long final was broadcast at 7:30 pm on 17 March 2007 on BBC One, with the half hour results show showing at 9:30 pm on the same date. Although this was past the 12 March cut-off set by the EBU, the BBC were given a special extension because the EBU were made aware of this over a year in advance.

The show ended in disarray when Fearne Cotton shouted out that the winner was Scooch, while co-host Terry Wogan simultaneously announced the winner to be Cyndi. After some confusion from both performers, each thinking the other had won, it was revealed that the true winner was Scooch.

In 2008 the show's name was changed to Eurovision: Your Decision. It was screened in two parts in March 2008, and was hosted by Claudia Winkleman and Sir Terry Wogan. The six competing acts were paired as girl groups (LoveShy and The Revelations), soloists (Michelle Gayle and Andy Abraham), and "Joseph and Maria" contestants (Rob McVeigh and Simona Armstrong) from the BBC talent shows Any Dream Will Do and How Do You Solve A Problem Like Maria?. A panel of three judges (John Barrowman, Carrie Grant, and Terry Wogan) decided which artists to put through to a semi-final after each pair had performed. Terry Wogan then allowed one of the rejected acts through as a "wild card" before viewers were invited to vote by phone to decide which two would perform again in the final. The two finalists chosen by the viewers were Michelle Gayle singing "Woo (You Make Me)", and Andy Abraham singing "Even If". Despite having been originally eliminated at the first stage, Terry Wogan's "wild card" pick turned out to be the winner when the viewers voted Andy Abraham the victor with "Even If". This received a total of 14 points in the Eurovision Song Contest 2008 on 24 May 2008 in Belgrade, finishing in last place, although sharing the same score with Poland (24th) and Germany (23rd).

Andrew Lloyd Webber in a promotional image for Your Country Needs You 2009

The BBC announced in a televised call for talent on 18 October 2008, that in 2009 there would be another change to the national final. The show was renamed Eurovision: Your Country Needs You, hosted by Graham Norton, and followed a format similar to popular BBC talent shows I'd Do Anything and Any Dream Will Do. The multi-week format had members of the public (amateur or professional) compete to represent the UK at the Eurovision Song Contest 2009, which was to be held in Moscow, Russia. In the final the three remaining contestants performed the song "It's My Time", composed by Andrew Lloyd Webber with lyrics by Diane Warren. The winner of the contest was Jade Ewen who went on to score a credible fifth place at the Eurovision final in Moscow.

=== 2010s ===
For 2010, the BBC announced on 29 January 2010, that songwriter and music producer Pete Waterman would be writing the UK's entry for the Eurovision Song Contest in Oslo, Norway, on 29 May. Waterman's writing partner was Mike Stock and the singer was chosen on 12 March, in a live show featuring six potential artists broadcast on BBC One, hosted by Graham Norton. Waterman chose three of the six acts to perform his song "That Sounds Good To Me", with the televiewers then selecting the winner. The winner was Josh Dubovie, who represented the UK in Oslo on 29 May and finished last with 10 points. The 2010 song was heavily criticised by fans and the media. Celebrity gossip blogger Christopher Couture went as far as to say "...last year, Andrew Lloyd Webber and Jade Ewen proved a good song and a good singer can get us a good score. This year, we're back to the bottom of the leaderboard as Pete 'stuck in the 80's' Waterman offers a song that even Butlins would call tacky."

On 29 January 2011, the BBC confirmed that boy band Blue had been chosen to represent the UK in the 2011 contest in Düsseldorf with the composition "I Can" written by Duncan James, Lee Ryan, Ciaron Bell, Ben Collier, Ian Hope, Liam Keenan and 'StarSign'. Band member Antony Costa had tried to represent the UK in 2006 as a soloist, placing second in the heat behind Daz Sampson. Other Blue personnel Lee Ryan had written one of the finalists in the 2005 UK heat and Duncan James was a panellist in the 2009 heat, going on to announce the UK scores at the Eurovision final from Moscow. James posted in a separate Twitter message that they have pre-selected their own song. The process thus excludes the UK viewing public from any participation in the British Eurovision selection for the first time. Blue became the first UK representatives since The Shadows in 1975 to have had multiple No.1 singles in the UK chart prior to appearing in Eurovision, and the first since Sonia in 1993 to have had a chart-topper at all. A documentary entitled Eurovision: Your Country Needs Blue was produced for BBC One broadcast on Saturday 16 April 2011. The group placed 11th at the Eurovision final with 100 points and peaked at no.16 in the UK singles chart.

For 2012, Engelbert Humperdinck was selected internally by the BBC to represent the UK in Baku, Azerbaijan with the song "Love Will Set You Free". The song is written by Grammy award-winning producer Martin Terefe and Ivor Novello winner Sacha Skarbek, who co-wrote James Blunt hit "You're Beautiful". It was reportedly recorded in London, Los Angeles and Nashville. At 76 years of age, Humperdinck was the oldest artist ever to appear for the UK at the Eurovision Song Contest and the first UK artist since 1976 to sing first. He placed second-to-last, only beating Norway.

Another internal selection took place for 2013, with Bonnie Tyler being chosen by the BBC to represent the UK in Malmö, Sweden. She came 19th in the Eurovision contest.

A fourth internal selection followed in 2014, with Molly Smitten-Downes, under her artist name of Molly, being chosen to represent the UK with the song "Children of the Universe", written and composed by Smitten-Downes herself. However, Smitten-Downes was an unknown artist who was chosen through the BBC Introducing scheme. The announcement of the selected artist and song was revealed on 3 March 2014 in a show entitled The UK Launch, and broadcast via the BBC Red Button service. The song finished in 17th place at the Eurovision Song Contest.

A fifth internal selection in 2015 selected the unknown act 'Electro Velvet' who went on to represent the UK with the song "Still in Love with You". The song was met with a mixed to negative reaction by the media and public. The artists and song were presented to the public in a special presentation show titled Our Song for Eurovision 2015 broadcast via the BBC Red Button service in March 2015. In the final the UK could only manage 24th place out of the 27 entries.

Original Eurovision: You Decide logo, inspired by Eurovision's Greatest Hits

Modified logo used for the first three editions of Eurovision: You Decide

The BBC announced on 30 September 2015 that the national public vote format would be returning to select the entry for the 2016 contest. The 2016 competition consisted of six entrants, performed and broadcast live on BBC Four from The O2 Forum in Kentish Town, London on 26 February and hosted by Mel Giedroyc. The six acts were selected by the UK branch of the international OGAE fan club, the British Academy of Songwriters, Composers and Authors (BASCA) and Hugh Goldsmith, former managing director of RCA Records and founder of Innocent Records. The six competing songs were premiered during The Ken Bruce Show on BBC Radio 2 on 22 February 2016. "You're Not Alone" performed by Joe and Jake won the national final; 746,000 viewers watched the show either live or within 7 days of its broadcast, making it the third highest rating programme for BBC Four in the week ending 28 February 2016. The duo placed 24th out of 26 entries at the Eurovision final in Stockholm, peaking at No.81 in the UK singles chart.

On 6 October 2016, the BBC announced that the You Decide show would return in 2017 with more details to be announced later in the year. On 9 December 2016, it was confirmed that Eurovision: You Decide would return on 27 January 2017. The 2017 competition consisted of six entrants, performed and broadcast live on BBC Two from the Eventim Apollo, in Hammersmith, London. The songs were revealed on 23 January during The Ken Bruce Show on BBC Radio 2. Six acts competed in the national final. The winner was selected through a public vote and, for the first time, the votes of a professional jury panel. Lucie Jones with the song "Never Give Up on You", written by Lawrie Martin, The Treatment and Danish Eurovision 2013 winner Emmelie de Forest, won the show. At the contest in Kyiv, Jones finished in 15th place, having placed 10th on jury votes alone, but attaining a weak score from public voting.

On 29 September 2017, it was confirmed that Eurovision: You Decide would return in 2018 on BBC Two. On 16 November 2017, Måns Zelmerlöw was announced as co-host for the UK national selection, which took place on 7 February 2018 at the Brighton Dome. The Dome was the venue for the Eurovision Song Contest 1974. The contest was won by SuRie performing "Storm" written and composed by Nicole Blair, Gil Lewis and Sean Hargreaves. The national final was watched by 900,000 viewers in the United Kingdom with a market share of 4.8% and thus failed to register in the Top 30 programmes viewed on BBC Two for the week. At the contest, the song placed 24th, but became infamous for its performance being disrupted at the live Grand Final in Lisbon by a stage invader.

Song submissions for the 2019 edition opened on 19 September 2018. On 30 November, the BBC announced that a new format would be used for 2019. Three songs, selected with the help of an international jury, were each performed in two musically different styles by two different artists, with one act from each pair going through to a final public vote. For the first time, the national final was broadcast live from Dock10, MediaCityUK in Salford. On 11 January, the date of the national final was confirmed as 8 February. Michael Rice's rendition of "Bigger than Us", written and composed by Laurell Barker, Anna-Klara Folin, John Lundvik and Jonas Thander, won the national final. However, the song finished last in the Grand Final in Tel Aviv, making it the fourth time in the past 16 years that the United Kingdom has finished at the bottom of the scoreboard.

=== 2020s ===
On 16 September 2019, it was announced that You Decide had been axed and that the song selection would return to the internal selection format most recently used between 2011 and 2015. The entry for the 2020 contest was chosen in collaboration with BMG. It was announced on 27 February 2020 that James Newman would represent the UK with the song "My Last Breath", however the contest was cancelled due to the COVID-19 pandemic. On 19 February 2021, BBC confirmed that Newman will represent the United Kingdom in the 2021 contest. The BBC also announced the renewed collaboration between BBC Studios and record label BMG. The song "Embers" was released and published by BMG and was revealed in March 2021. Newman went on to place last in the Eurovision final, scoring no points from either the jury or the televote.

On 21 October 2021, it was confirmed that BBC Studios would partner with TaP Music to select and produce its entry for the 2022 contest, and that the UK's television coverage would be produced and broadcast from Salford, with the points awarded by the UK jury announced live from Dock10 studios. The song "Space Man" performed by Sam Ryder was revealed as the UK entry on 10 March 2022. Ryder finished in second place at the Eurovision final with 466 points, becoming the highest-scoring UK Eurovision entrant. He won the jury vote and also scored the UK its best result since 1998 and its first top three since 2002. Ryder also won the Marcel Bezençon Press Award, becoming the first UK act to win a Bezençon Award. TaP Music partnered with the BBC again in 2023 to select Mae Muller to perform "I Wrote a Song" in the contest in Liverpool on 13 May. It finished in 25th place with 24 points overall. Later that year, TaP Music ended its partnership with the BBC.

On 16 December 2023, Olly Alexander was announced as the selected artist for the 2024 contest in Malmö. Alexander made the announcement during the final of the 21st series of Strictly Come Dancing. His song for the contest "Dizzy", co-written with Danny L Harle, was released on 1 March 2024. Girl band Remember Monday were announced as the UK's 2025 representatives on 7 March 2025. Another internal selection followed in 2026, when Sam Battle under his performance name of Look Mum No Computer was confirmed as the artist representing the UK in Vienna with the song "Eins, Zwei, Drei"; the first British Eurovision entry with a non-English title, although the lyrics are predominately English. The track is written by Battle, Thomas Stengaard, Lasse Midtsian Nymann and Julie Aagaard.

== Winners ==
For UK Singles Chart positions, only tracks that have appeared in the officially recognised and published Top 50 (to 1978), Top 75 (to 2012) and Top 100 (from 2012) are included. Any track that fell below the published threshold was not a UK chart hit.

=== Festival of British Popular Songs (1957) ===
Year	Artist	Song	UK Chart	At Eurovision
1957	Patricia Bredin	"All"	Not recorded or released	7th

=== Eurovision Song Contest British Final (1959–1960) ===
Year	Artist	Song	UK Chart	At Eurovision
1959	Pearl Carr & Teddy Johnson	"Sing, Little Birdie"	12	2nd
1960	Bryan Johnson	"Looking High, High, High"	20	2nd

=== A Song for Europe (1961–1995) ===
Year	Artist	Song	UK Chart	At Eurovision
1961	The Allisons	"Are You Sure?"	2	2nd
1962	Ronnie Carroll	"Ring-A-Ding Girl"	46	4th
1963	Ronnie Carroll	"Say Wonderful Things"	6	4th
1964	Matt Monro	"I Love the Little Things"	Failed to chart (Note: Although "I Love The Little Things" failed to reach the official top 50 singles chart in 1964, the EP release containing the track and the other UK finalists reached #16 in the official EP charts.)	2nd
1965	Kathy Kirby	"I Belong"	36	2nd
1966	Kenneth McKellar	"A Man Without Love"	30	9th
1967	Sandie Shaw	"Puppet on a String"	1	1st
1968	Cliff Richard	"Congratulations"	1	2nd
1969	Lulu	"Boom Bang-a-Bang"	2	1st
1970	Mary Hopkin	"Knock Knock, Who's There?"	2	2nd
1971	Clodagh Rodgers	"Jack in the Box"	4	4th
1972	The New Seekers	"Beg, Steal or Borrow"	2	2nd
1973	Cliff Richard	"Power to All Our Friends"	4	3rd
1974	Olivia Newton-John	"Long Live Love"	11	4th
1975	The Shadows	"Let Me Be the One"	12	2nd
1976	Brotherhood of Man	"Save Your Kisses for Me"	1	1st
1977	Lynsey de Paul & Mike Moran	"Rock Bottom"	19	2nd
1978	Co-Co	"The Bad Old Days"	13	11th
1979	Black Lace	"Mary Ann"	42	7th
1980	Prima Donna	"Love Enough for Two"	48	3rd
1981	Bucks Fizz	"Making Your Mind Up"	1	1st
1982	Bardo	"One Step Further"	2	7th
1983	Sweet Dreams	"I'm Never Giving Up"	21	6th
1984	Belle and the Devotions	"Love Games"	11	7th
1985	Vikki	"Love Is"	49	4th
1986	Ryder	"Runner in the Night"	98 (Note: Both "Runner in the Night" and "Only The Light" reached the lower end of the top 100 of the singles chart reserved for new releases that were 'bubbling under' the official Top 75, but failed to register in the official top 75 itself.)	7th
1987	Rikki	"Only the Light"	96	13th
1988	Scott Fitzgerald	"Go"	52	2nd
1989	Live Report	"Why Do I Always Get it Wrong?"	73	2nd
1990	Emma	"Give a Little Love Back to the World"	33	6th
1991	Samantha Janus	"A Message to Your Heart"	30	10th
1992	Michael Ball	"One Step Out of Time"	20	2nd
1993	Sonia	"Better the Devil You Know"	15	2nd
1994	Frances Ruffelle	"We Will Be Free (Lonely Symphony)"	25	10th
1995	Love City Groove	"Love City Groove"	7	10th

=== The Great British Song Contest (1996–1999) ===
Year	Artist	Song	UK Chart	At Eurovision
1996	Gina G	"Ooh Aah... Just a Little Bit"	1	8th
1997	Katrina and the Waves	"Love Shine a Light"	3	1st
1998	Imaani	"Where Are You?"	15	2nd
1999	Precious	"Say It Again"	6	12th

=== A Song for Europe (2000–2003) ===
Year	Artist	Song	UK Chart	At Eurovision
2000	Nicki French	"Don't Play That Song Again"	34	16th
2001	Lindsay D	"No Dream Impossible"	32	15th
2002	Jessica Garlick	"Come Back"	13	3rd
2003	Jemini	"Cry Baby"	15	26th (0)

=== Eurovision: Making Your Mind Up (2004–2007) ===
Year	Artist	Song	UK Chart	At Eurovision
2004	James Fox	"Hold On to Our Love"	13	16th
2005	Javine	"Touch My Fire"	18	22nd
2006	Daz Sampson	"Teenage Life"	8	19th
2007	Scooch	"Flying the Flag (for You)"	5	22nd

=== Eurovision: Your Decision (2008) ===
Year	Artist	Song	UK Chart	At Eurovision
2008	Andy Abraham	"Even If"	67	25th

=== Eurovision: Your Country Needs You (2009–2010) ===
Year	Artist	Song	UK Chart	At Eurovision
2009	Jade Ewen	"It's My Time"	27	5th
2010	Josh Dubovie	"That Sounds Good to Me"	Failed to chart (Note: The track reached 179 as stated on the official charts website.)	25th

=== Internal selection (2011–2015) ===
Year	Artist	Song	UK Chart	At Eurovision
2011	Blue	"I Can"	16	11th
2012	Engelbert Humperdinck	"Love Will Set You Free"	60	25th
2013	Bonnie Tyler	"Believe in Me"	93	19th
2014	Molly	"Children of the Universe"	23	17th
2015	Electro Velvet	"Still in Love with You"	Failed to chart (Note: Failed to Chart.)	24th

=== Eurovision: You Decide (2016–2019) ===
Year	Artist	Song	UK Chart	At Eurovision
2016	Joe and Jake	"You're Not Alone"	81	24th
2017	Lucie Jones	"Never Give Up on You"	73	15th
2018	SuRie	"Storm"	50	24th
2019	Michael Rice	"Bigger than Us"	Failed to chart (Note: The track reached No.27 in the download only singles chart, but failed to register in the Official Top 100 Singles Chart.)	26th

=== Internal selection (2020–present) ===
Year	Artist	Song	UK Chart	At Eurovision
2020	James Newman	"My Last Breath"	Failed to chart (Note: The track reached No.23 in the download only singles chart, but failed to register in the Official Top 100 Singles Chart.)	Contest cancelled (Note: The 2020 contest was cancelled due to the COVID-19 pandemic.)
2021	James Newman	"Embers"	47	26th (0)
2022	Sam Ryder	"Space Man"	2	2nd
2023	Mae Muller	"I Wrote a Song"	9	25th
2024	Olly Alexander	"Dizzy"	42	18th
2025	Remember Monday	"What the Hell Just Happened?"	31	19th
2026	Look Mum No Computer	"Eins, Zwei, Drei"	83	25th

== Broadcast ==
From 1964 to 1975, the Song for Europe programme was pre-recorded, often several weeks in advance. The result was typically broadcast one week after each Song for Europe programme. From 1988 to 1991, in 1995, and again from 2004 to 2008 the result was broadcast in a separate programme, shown later the same night as the performances. From 1986 to 1995, A Song for Europe was also broadcast on BBC Radio 2 with commentary by Ray Moore in 1986–87 and later by Ken Bruce from 1988, although Radio 2 did not broadcast the results show from 1991 onwards.

From 1992 to 1994, the programme was again pre-recorded, but the result show was live and broadcast on the same, or following night. In 1997 and 1998, the results were announced the following Saturday after the final and on the following Friday in 1999.

From 1957 to 1960, there were various televised semi-finals ahead of the UK final. This was reintroduced in 1996, with a preliminary round of voting to eliminate 4 of the 8 songs. This was televised in 1996 but switched to radio from 1997 to 2003.

=== Venues and presenters ===
Year	Selection show	Main venue	National final		
Year	Selection show	Main venue	Main presenter	Co-host	Semi-final/heat host
1957	Festival of British Popular Songs	The King's Theatre	David Jacobs	No co-host	David Jacobs
1959	Eurovision Song Contest British Final	BBC Television Theatre	Pete Murray	No co-host	Pete Murray
1960	Eurovision Song Contest British Final	BBC Television Theatre	David Jacobs	No co-host	David Jacobs
1961	A Song for Europe	BBC Television Theatre	Katie Boyle	No co-host	No semi final/heat
1962	A Song for Europe	BBC Television Theatre	David Jacobs	No co-host	No semi final/heat
1963	A Song for Europe	BBC Television Theatre	David Jacobs	No co-host	No semi final/heat
1964	A Song for Europe	BBC Television Theatre	David Jacobs	No co-host	No semi final/heat
1965	A Song for Europe	BBC Television Theatre	David Jacobs	No co-host	No semi final/heat
1966	A Song for Europe	BBC Television Theatre	David Jacobs	No co-host	No semi final/heat
1967	A Song for Europe	BBC Television Theatre	Rolf Harris	No co-host	No semi final/heat
1968	A Song for Europe	BBC Television Theatre	Cilla Black	No co-host	No semi final/heat
1969	A Song for Europe	BBC Television Theatre	Michael Aspel	No co-host	No semi final/heat
1970	A Song for Europe	BBC Television Theatre	Cliff Richard	No co-host	No semi final/heat
1971	A Song for Europe	BBC Television Theatre	Cliff Richard	No co-host	No semi final/heat
1972	A Song for Europe	BBC Television Theatre	Cliff Richard	No co-host	No semi final/heat
1973	A Song for Europe	BBC Television Theatre	Cilla Black	No co-host	No semi final/heat
1974	A Song for Europe	BBC Television Theatre	Jimmy Savile	No co-host	No semi final/heat
1975	A Song for Europe	BBC Television Theatre	Lulu	No co-host	No semi final/heat
1976	A Song for Europe	Royal Albert Hall	Michael Aspel	No co-host	No semi final/heat
1977	A Song for Europe	New London Theatre	Terry Wogan	No co-host	No semi final/heat
1978	A Song for Europe	Royal Albert Hall	Terry Wogan	No co-host	No semi final/heat
1979	A Song for Europe	Royal Albert Hall	Terry Wogan	No co-host	No semi final/heat
1980	A Song for Europe	BBC Television Theatre	Terry Wogan	No co-host	No semi final/heat
1981	A Song for Europe	BBC Television Theatre	Terry Wogan	No co-host	No semi final/heat
1982	A Song for Europe	BBC Television Centre	Terry Wogan	No co-host	No semi final/heat
1983	A Song for Europe	BBC Television Theatre	Terry Wogan	No co-host	No semi final/heat
1984	A Song for Europe	BBC Television Centre	Terry Wogan	No co-host	No semi final/heat
1985	A Song for Europe	BBC Television Centre	Terry Wogan	No co-host	No semi final/heat
1986	A Song for Europe	BBC Television Centre	Terry Wogan	No co-host	No semi final/heat
1987	A Song for Europe	BBC Television Centre	Terry Wogan	No co-host	No semi final/heat
1988	A Song for Europe	BBC Television Centre	Terry Wogan	No co-host	No semi final/heat
1989	A Song for Europe	BBC Television Centre	Terry Wogan	No co-host	No semi final/heat
1990	A Song for Europe	BBC Television Centre	Terry Wogan	No co-host	No semi final/heat
1991	A Song for Europe	BBC Television Centre	Terry Wogan	No co-host	No semi final/heat
1992	A Song for Europe	BBC Television Centre	Terry Wogan	No co-host	No semi final/heat
1993	A Song for Europe	BBC Television Centre	Terry Wogan	No co-host	No semi final/heat
1994	A Song for Europe	BBC Television Centre	Terry Wogan	No co-host	No semi final/heat
1995	A Song for Europe	BBC Television Centre	Terry Wogan	No co-host	No semi final/heat
1996	The Great British Song Contest	BBC Television Centre	Terry Wogan	No co-host	Nicky Campbell
1997	The Great British Song Contest	BBC Television Centre	Dale Winton	No co-host	Ken Bruce; Terry Wogan
1998	The Great British Song Contest	BBC Television Centre	Terry Wogan	Ulrika Jonsson	Ken Bruce; Terry Wogan
1999	The Great British Song Contest	BBC Elstree Studios	Ulrika Jonsson	No co-host	Ken Bruce; Terry Wogan
2000	A Song for Europe	BBC Elstree Studios	Katy Hill	No co-host	Ken Bruce; Terry Wogan
2001	A Song for Europe	BBC Elstree Studios	Katy Hill	No co-host	Ken Bruce; Terry Wogan
2002	A Song for Europe	BBC Elstree Studios	Christopher Price	Claire Sweeney	Ken Bruce; Terry Wogan
2003	A Song for Europe	BBC Television Centre	Terry Wogan	No co-host	Ken Bruce; Terry Wogan
2004	Eurovision: Making Your Mind Up	BBC Television Centre	Terry Wogan	Gaby Roslin	No semi-final/heat
2005	Eurovision: Making Your Mind Up	BBC Television Centre	Terry Wogan	Natasha Kaplinsky	No semi-final/heat
2006	Eurovision: Making Your Mind Up	BBC Television Centre	Terry Wogan	Natasha Kaplinsky	No semi-final/heat
2007	Eurovision: Making Your Mind Up	The Maidstone Studios	Terry Wogan	Fearne Cotton	No semi-final/heat
2008	Eurovision: Your Decision	BBC Television Centre	Terry Wogan	Claudia Winkleman	No semi-final/heat
2009	Eurovision: Your Country Needs You	BBC Television Centre	Graham Norton	No co-host	Graham Norton
2010	Eurovision: Your Country Needs You	BBC Television Centre	Graham Norton	No co-host	No semi-final/heat
2011	Internal selection				
2012	Internal selection				
2013	Internal selection				
2014	The UK Launch	One MayFair	Internal selection		
2015	Our Song for Eurovision 2015	Café de Paris	Internal selection		
2016	Eurovision: You Decide	The O2 Forum	Mel Giedroyc	No co-host	No semi-final/heat
2017	Eurovision: You Decide	Eventim Apollo	Mel Giedroyc	No co-host	No semi-final/heat
2018	Eurovision: You Decide	Brighton Dome	Mel Giedroyc	Måns Zelmerlöw	No semi-final/heat
2019	Eurovision: You Decide	Dock10, MediaCityUK	Mel Giedroyc	Måns Zelmerlöw	No semi-final/heat
2020	Internal selection				
2021	Internal selection				
2022	Internal selection				
2023	Eurovision 2023: Meet the UK Act (Note: The internally selected artist appeared in a special programme on BBC One where they were interviewed by the host (Mills in 2023 and Norton since 2024). This was followed by the first full televised broadcast of the song's music video.)	Internal selection			
2024	Graham Meets Olly	Internal selection			
2025	When Graham Met Remember Monday	Internal selection			
2026	Internal selection				

== Guest commentators, panellists and judges ==
Featured in 1988–1990, 1994–1995, 2004–2010 and 2016–2019.

Year	Commentators and panellists
1988	Gloria Hunniford, George Martin, Bruce Welch, Mike Batt
1989	Deke Arlon, Gary Davies, Leslie Bricusse, Lulu
1990	Cathy McGowan, Gloria Hunniford, Carl Davis, Tim Rice
1994	Richard O'Brien, Jonathan King
1995	Jonathan King, Mike Read, Cheryl Baker, Tony Mortimer, Ian Dury, Let Loose, Bruno Brookes, Scarlet
2004	Lorraine Kelly, Harry Hill, Carrie Grant
2005	Jonathan Ross, Bruno Tonioli, Paddy O'Connell, Natalie Cassidy
2006	Jonathan Ross, Bruno Tonioli, Fearne Cotton, Kelly Osbourne
2007	John Barrowman, Mel Giedroyc
2009	Lulu, (Note: Appeared as a panelist in the televised heats; Lulu in the first and second, Phillips in the first, James in the second, Bunton and Dixon in the third) (Note: Appeared as a panelist in the televised final) Arlene Phillips, Duncan James, Emma Bunton, Alesha Dixon
2010	Bruno Tonioli, Jade Ewen, Mike Stock
2016	Carrie Grant, Katrina Leskanich, Jay Revell
2017	Bruno Tonioli, Sophie Ellis-Bextor, CeCe Sammy
2018	Rylan Clark-Neal, Rochelle Humes, Tom Fletcher
2019	Rylan Clark, Marvin Humes, Mollie King

Year	Judges
2008	John Barrowman, (Note: Acted as "judges" to eliminate contestants in preliminary rounds) Carrie Grant, Terry Wogan (Note: Acted as "judges" to 'save' contestants from elimination)
2009	Andrew Lloyd Webber, Colin Barlow (auditions)
2010	Pete Waterman
2017 (Note: The names of five of the eight-member professional jury panel were not made public)	Bruno Tonioli, Sophie Ellis-Bextor, CeCe Sammy
2018	Caroline Sullivan, Roisin O'Connor, Steve Tandy, Sara Sesardic, Alastair Webber, Marco Sensi, David Grant, Kele Le Roc
2019	Rylan Clark, Marvin Humes, Mollie King

== Regional vote announcers ==
Featured in 1957, 1959 to 1964, 1976 to 1978, 1980 to 1987 and from 2003 to 2006. Although regional juries were used in 1979, the broadcast was abandoned and the scores tallied without announcements.

In 1976, host Michael Aspel did not name any of the jury spokesman (there were no women announcing any of the scores) and none of them identified themselves; despite some of the voices being familiar to BBC viewers and listeners. The list provided is thus independently researched.

1976
Jury Spokespersons
Jury	Spokesperson
Bristol	Chris Denham
Bangor	Elfyn Thomas
Leeds	Brian Baines
Norwich	John Crowest
Newcastle	Mike Neville
Aberdeen	Gerry Davis
Birmingham	Tom Coyne
Manchester	Mike Riddoch
Belfast	Michael Baguley
Cardiff	Iwan Thomas
Plymouth	Donald Heighway
Glasgow	David Findlay
Southampton	Peter Macann
London	Ray Moore

1977
Jury Spokespersons
Jury	Spokesperson
Belfast	Michael Baguley
Bristol	Chris Denham
Aberdeen	Gerry Davis
Leeds	Brian Baines
Bangor	Emrys Jones
London	Ray Moore
Birmingham	David Shoot
Cardiff	Frank Lincoln
Glasgow	David Findlay
Manchester	Mike Riddoch
Southampton	Paul Harris
Norwich	Ian Masters
Newcastle	Mike Neville
Plymouth	Kevin Crooks

1978
Region	Announcer
Aberdeen	Gerry Davis
Norwich	Chris Denham
Manchester	Mike Riddoch
Bangor	Gwyn Llewelyn
Southampton	Peter Macann
Leeds	Brian Baines
Belfast	Michael Baguley
Bristol	Derek Jones
Glasgow	Ken Bruce
Birmingham	Tom Coyne
London	Ray Moore
Cardiff	Frank Lincoln
Newcastle	Mike Neville
Plymouth	Donald Hayway

1980
Region	Announcer
Aberdeen	Gerry Davis
Newcastle	Mike Neville
Plymouth	Donald Hayway
Leeds	Brian Baines
Southampton	Peter Macann
Bangor	Alan Evans
London	Colin Berry
Cardiff	Iwan Thomas
Birmingham	David Stevens
Glasgow	Douglas Brock
Belfast	Mike Baguley
Bristol	Derek Jones
Norwich	Jill Hewitt
Manchester	John Mundy

1981
Region	Announcer
Birmingham	David Stevens
Cardiff	Iwan Thomas
Manchester	John Mundy
Belfast	Peter Dickson
Edinburgh	Jim O'Hara
London	Ray Moore
Bristol	Andy Batten-Foster

1982
Region	Announcer
Glasgow	Ken Bruce
Birmingham	David Freeman
Bristol	Andy Batten-Foster
Belfast	David Olver
London	Ray Moore
Manchester	John Mundy
Cardiff	Iwan Thomas

1983
Region	Announcer
Cardiff	Iwan Thomas
Belfast	David Olver
Norwich	Ian Masters
Glasgow	Ken Bruce
Bristol	Andy Batten-Foster
Birmingham	Marjorie Lofthouse
Manchester	John Mundy
London	Colin Berry

1984
Region	Announcer
Edinburgh	Ken Bruce
Norwich	Judi Lines
Belfast	Diane Harron
London	Colin Berry
Cardiff	Iwan Thomas
Manchester	Alan Yardley
Bristol	Vivien Creegor
Birmingham	Paul Coia

1985
Region	Announcer
Belfast	Jim Neely
Birmingham	Paul Coia
Cardiff	Iwan Thomas
Glasgow	Viv Lumsden
London	Colin Berry
Norwich	Stuart White
Bristol	Vivien Creegor
Manchester	John Mundy
Plymouth	Christopher Slade

1986
Region	Announcer
Birmingham	Paul Coia
Manchester	John Mundy
Bristol	Angela Rippon
Norwich	David Platen
Newcastle	Mike Neville
Cardiff	Maureen Staffer
London	Colin Berry
Leeds	Linda Driburgh-Smith
Glasgow	Dougie Donnelly
Plymouth	Christopher Slade
Belfast	Rose Neill

1987
Region	Announcer
Belfast	Stephanie Callister
Birmingham	Pamela Armstrong
Bristol	Angela Rippon
Edinburgh	Louise Welsh
Cardiff	Iwan Thomas
Manchester	John Mundy
London	Colin Berry
Newcastle	Simon Willis
Norwich	Susan Osman

2003
Region	Announcer
South England	Esther Rantzen
Wales	Jessica Garlick
Northern Ireland	Joe Mace
Midlands England	Mel and Sue
North England	Matt Baker
Scotland	Nicholas Parsons

2004
Region/vote	Announcer(s)
South East England	Fearne Cotton
Scotland	Colin McAllister and Justin Ryan
Northern Ireland	Malachi Cush
Wales	Colin Jackson
North England	Sonia
Midlands England	Hayley Evetts
South West England	Sharron Davies
SMS	Lorraine Kelly

2005
Region/vote	Announcer(s)
Northern Ireland	Zöe Salmon
North England	Stuart Hall
Scotland	Colin McAllister and Justin Ryan
Wales	James Fox
South West England	Sharron Davies
Midlands England	Denise Lewis
South East England	Fearne Cotton
Internet	Ruslana
SMS	Sandie Shaw

2006
Region	Announcer(s)
Scotland	Michelle McManus
Wales	Maggot
Northern Ireland	Roy Walker
North England	Kelli Young
Midlands England	Rustie Lee
South East England	Alistair Appleton
South West England	Simon Grant
Internet	Javine Hylton
SMS	Helena Paparizou

== Viewing figures ==
Year	Nominal	Share	Channel
1998	2,660,000	Unknown	BBC One
1998	9,810,000	Unknown	BBC One
1999	3,140,000	Unknown	BBC One
1999	3,040,000	Unknown	BBC Two
2004	7,200,000	Unknown	BBC One
2005	7,500,000	Unknown	BBC One
2006	2,800,000	Unknown	BBC One
2006	6,100,000	Unknown	BBC One
2007	5,100,000	22.6%	BBC One
2007	5,600,000	25.7%	BBC One
2008	5,000,300	24%	BBC One
2009	5,610,000	25%	BBC One
2010	2,920,000	12.5%	BBC One
2016	680,000	3.2%	BBC Four
2017	1,260,000	6.6%	BBC Two
2018	900,000	4.8%	BBC Two
2019	1,170,000	6.4%	BBC Two

== Discography ==
=== UK singles chart successes for all entries to the UK final ===
Only tracks that have appeared in the officially recognised Top 50 (to 1978), Top 75 (to 2012) and Top 100 (from 2012) are included:

Year	Chart	Song title	Artist
1959	12	"Sing Little Birdie"	Pearl Carr and Teddy Johnson
1960	20	"Looking High, High, High"	Bryan Johnson
1961	27	"Dream Girl"	Mark Wynter
1961	2	"Are You Sure?"	The Allisons
1962	46	"Ring-a-Ding Girl"	Ronnie Carroll
1962	9	"Never Goodbye"	Karl Denver
1963	6	"Say Wonderful Things"	Ronnie Carroll
1965	36	"I Belong"/"I'll Try Not to Cry"	Kathy Kirby
1966	30	"A Man Without Love"/"Country Girl"	Kenneth McKellar
1967	1	"Puppet on a String"/"Tell the Boys"	Sandie Shaw
1968	1	"Congratulations"/"High 'n' Dry"	Cliff Richard
1969	2	"Boom Bang-a-Bang"/"March"	Lulu
1970	2	"Knock, Knock (Who's There)?"/"I'm Gonna Fall in Love Again"	Mary Hopkin
1971	4	"Jack in the Box"/"The Wind of Change"/"Someone to Love Me"	Clodagh Rodgers
1971	13	"Another Time, Another Place"	Engelbert Humperdinck (Note: "Another Time, Another Place" was included on the 1972 budget LP Clodagh Rodgers, after it had become a No.13 hit single for Engelbert Humperdinck. It also charted in the United States at No.25.)
1972 (Note: A cover version of "Songs Of Praise" from the 1972 contest was featured as the B-side of "Dear Elaine", a number 18 UK hit in 1973 for the song's composer, Roy Wood.)	2	"Beg, Steal or Borrow"/"One by One"	The New Seekers
1973	4	"Power to All Our Friends"/"Come Back Billie Jo"	Cliff Richard
1973	29	"Help It Along"/"Tomorrow Rising"/"Ashes to Ashes"/"Days of Love"	Cliff Richard
1974	11	"Long Live Love"/"Angeleyes"	Olivia Newton-John
1975	12	"Let Me Be the One"/"Stand Up Like a Man"	The Shadows
1975	20	"Don't Throw It All Away"	Gary Benson (Note: Benson released his own recording of "Don't Throw It All Away", written by himself and David Mindel, which had placed 4th in the national final performed by The Shadows.)
1976	1	"Save Your Kisses for Me"	Brotherhood of Man
1977	19	"Rock Bottom"	Lynsey de Paul and Mike Moran
1978	13	"The Bad Old Days"	Co-Co
1979	42	"Mary Ann"	Black Lace
1980	48	"Love Enough for Two"	Prima Donna
1981	1	"Making Your Mind Up"	Bucks Fizz
1981	42	"Don't Panic"	Liquid Gold
1981	10	"Have You Ever Been in Love?"	Leo Sayer (Note: "Have You Ever Been In Love?", composed by Andy Hill, Peter Sinfield and John Danter and performed by Gem in the national final, was a UK no.10 hit for Sayer in 1982, also reaching no.4 in Australia.)
1982	2	"One Step Further"	Bardo
1983	21	"I'm Never Giving Up"	Sweet Dreams
1984	11	"Love Games"	Belle and the Devotions
1985	49	"Love Is..."	Vikki
1985	85	"The Clock on the Wall"	Alvin Stardust (Note: "The Clock On The Wall" appears on EP "So Near To Christmas".)
1986	98	"Runner in the Night"	Ryder (Note: Technically not a hit as the UK chart only officially recorded a Top 75 for singles at the time. The positions 76–100 at this time were only for releases that had not yet appeared in the Top 75, but were 'bubbling under' the Top 75.)
1987	96	"Only the Light"	Rikki
1988	52	"Go"	Scott Fitzgerald
1989	73	"Why Do I Always Get It Wrong?"	Live Report
1990	33	"Give a Little Love Back to the World"	Emma
1991	30	"A Message to Your Heart"	Samantha Janus
1992	20	"One Step Out of Time"	Michael Ball
1993	15	"Better the Devil You Know"	Sonia
1994	25	"Lonely Symphony (We Will Be Free)"	Frances Ruffelle
1995	7	"Love City Groove"	Love City Groove
1995	10	"I Need You"	Deuce
1995	55	"I'm Just Your Puppet (On a String)"	Londonbeat
1995	47	"Go for the Heart"	Sox
1995	68	"One Gift of Love"	Dear Jon
1996	1	"Ooh Aah... Just a Little Bit"	Gina G
1996	50	"I Gave You Everything"	Code Red
1997	3	"Love Shine a Light"	Katrina and the Waves
1998	15	"Where Are You?"	Imaani
1999	6	"Say It Again"	Precious
2000	34	"Don't Play That Song Again"	Nicki French
2000	72	"Only the Women Know"	Six Chix
2001	32	"No Dream Impossible"	Lindsay D
2001	42	"To Die For"	Luke Galliana
2002	13	"Come Back"	Jessica Garlick
2003	15	"Cry Baby"	Jemini
2004	13	"Hold On to Our Love"	James Fox
2005	18	"Touch My Fire"	Javine
2006	8	"Teenage Life"	Daz Sampson
2007	5	"Flying the Flag (For You)"	Scooch
2008	67	"Even If"	Andy Abraham
2009	27	"It's My Time"	Jade Ewen
2011	16	"I Can"	Blue
2012	60	"Love Will Set You Free"	Engelbert Humperdinck
2013	93	"Believe in Me"	Bonnie Tyler
2014	23	"Children of the Universe"	Molly
2016	81	"You're Not Alone"	Joe and Jake
2017	73	"Never Give Up on You"	Lucie Jones
2018	50	"Storm"	SuRie
2021	47	"Embers"	James Newman
2022	2	"Space Man"	Sam Ryder
2023	9	"I Wrote a Song"	Mae Muller
2024	42	"Dizzy"	Olly Alexander
2025	31	"What the Hell Just Happened?"	Remember Monday
2026	83	"Eins, Zwei, Drei"	Look Mum No Computer

==== UK year end chart positions ====
Positions achieved in the year end UK Singles Chart.

Year	Chart	Song	Artist	Ref.
1959	87	"Sing Little Birdie"	Pearl Carr and Teddy Johnson	
1961	8	"Are You Sure?"	The Allisons	
1962	49	"Never Goodbye"	Karl Denver	
1963	65	"Say Wonderful Things"	Ronnie Carroll	
1967	6	"Puppet on a String"	Sandie Shaw	
1968	19	"Congratulations"	Cliff Richard	
1969	44	"Boom Bang-a-Bang"	Lulu	
1970	36	"Knock, Knock (Who's There?)"	Mary Hopkin	
1971	73	"Jack in the Box"	Clodagh Rodgers	
1972	14	"Beg, Steal or Borrow"	The New Seekers	
1973	46	"Power to all our Friends"	Cliff Richard	
1976	1	"Save Your Kisses for Me"	Brotherhood of Man	
1981	7	"Making Your Mind Up"	Bucks Fizz	
1982	79	"One Step Further"	Bardo	
1995	78	"Love City Groove"	Love City Groove	
1996	4	"Ooh Aah... Just a Little Bit"	Gina G	
1997	64	"Love Shine a Light"	Katrina and the Waves	
2022	66	"Space Man"	Sam Ryder	

=== UK extended play chart successes ===
From 1964 to 1968, Extended Play, 7-inch singles containing all of the entries from the UK heats were issued, although in 1967, the winning song was omitted from the release. A separate EP chart was established at the time for such releases that were not eligible for the standard UK Singles Chart; it was discontinued after 1967.

Year	Title	Songs	Artist	Chart	Label
1964	A Song for Europe	"I Love the Little Things"; "Choose"; "Ten Out of Ten"; "Wonderful, Wonderful"; "I've Got the Moon on My Side"; "It's Funny How You Know"	Matt Monro	16	Parlophone
1965	BBC TV's Song for Europe	"I Belong"; "I'll Try Not to Cry"; "One Day"; "My Only Love"; "I Won't Let You Go"; "Sometimes"	Kathy Kirby	9	Decca
1967	Tell the Boys	"Tell the Boys"; "Had a Dream Last Night"; "Ask Any Woman"; "I'll Cry Myself to Sleep"	Sandie Shaw	4	Pye

== Trivia ==
- According to John Kennedy O'Connor's book The Eurovision Song Contest – The Official History, the selection of Clodagh Rodgers in 1971 was due in part at nervousness within the BBC as to what reception the UK entrant would receive on stage in Dublin at the Eurovision final due to the unrest in Northern Ireland at the time.
- Paul Curtis holds the record for writing/composing the most number of winning songs, having won the UK heat on four occasions (1975, 1984, 1990 and 1991). The other writers/composers to win the contest more than once are Syd Cordell and Stan Butcher, who won the contest with a joint composition in both 1959 and 1962; Bill Martin and Phil Coulter won in 1967 and 1968, going on to win the Eurovision Song Contest in 1967; and Stephanie de Sykes and Stuart Slater won the contest together in 1978 and 1980.
- Paul Curtis also holds the record for writing/composing the most number of entries in the UK domestic competition. Between 1975 and 1992, 22 of his songs appeared in the UK final. From 1982 to 1984, he composed 8 of the 24 finalists.
- Authors and composers from four of the five teams who won the UK domestic heat and went on to win the Eurovision Song Contest subsequently (Bill Martin, Phil Coulter, Lee Sheridan, Martin Lee, Tony Hiller, Andy Hill, John Danter and Kimberley Rew) all made multiple attempts to write songs for Eurovision; all reaching the UK final with other songs. Only the 1969 winners Peter Warne and Alan Moorhouse never had songs featured in the UK heat other than their winning song.
- Lita Roza, Anne Shelton, Ronnie Hilton, Craig Douglas, Ricky Valance, Sandie Shaw, Cliff Richard, Mary Hopkin, The New Seekers/Lyn Paul, The Shadows, Frank Ifield, The Foundations, Sweet Sensation, Carl Wayne (of The Move), Alvin Stardust, Les McKeown (of Bay City Rollers), Sonia, Antony Costa (of Blue), Brian Harvey (of East 17), Liz McClarnon (of Atomic Kitten), Blue, Engelbert Humperdinck and Bonnie Tyler had all enjoyed a number one UK single prior to putting themselves forward for Eurovision.
- Sandie Shaw, Cliff Richard, Brotherhood of Man, Bucks Fizz and Gina G are the only acts to take their song from the UK final to number one in the UK singles chart.
- Only Frank Ifield, Cliff Richard, Lulu, The New Seekers, Olivia Newton-John, Brotherhood of Man, Tony Christie, Bucks Fizz and Michael Ball have been able to reach the pinnacle of the top of the UK singles chart after appearing in the contest. Ball's first number one single was achieved 28 years after his Eurovision appearance. Additionally, other Song for Europe contestants, Kenny Lynch, The Nolans, Black Lace and Tony Christie all took part in the charity supergroup project The Crowd, formed specifically to produce a charity record for the Bradford City stadium fire, in which 56 people died on 11 May 1985. Their song "You'll Never Walk Alone" topped the UK singles chart in June 1985. Another 'charity supergroup' named Ferry Aid topped the UK singles chart in 1987 with the single Let It Be. This group featured contributions from Hazell Dean, Bucks Fizz, Bobby McVay, The New Seekers, The Nolans, Alvin Stardust and Bonnie Tyler. Another Song for Europe veteran, Des Dyer (1983 and 1985), provided the vocals on behalf of Robson & Jerome for three UK number one singles in the 1990s.
- Polly Brown is the only artist in a multi-artist final to perform two songs. She appeared as a soloist and as one half of Sweet Dreams in the 1976 competition, finishing 10th and 4th respectively. Catherine Porter had two songs in the 2000 competition, but only one reached the televised final.
- The Sweet Dreams who placed 4th in 1976 are no relation to the Sweet Dreams that won the contest in 1983. The first is a male/female duo, the second is a trio of two girls and one boy. Carrie Grant, who works extensively on British TV as a voice coach, was a member of the Sweet Dreams trio.
- The Pearls, a female quartet formed specifically for the 1989 contest are no relation to The Pearls, a female duo who had some minor chart hits in the early 1970s. Similarly, Joanne Castle, a female soloist who performed under the name 'Christie' in the 1991 contest, is no relation to the male group Christie that topped the UK charts with the song "Yellow River".
- 'Beano' participated in the 1977 contest, placing 10th with a song written by Paul Curtis, who wrote four UK Eurovision entries, before returning in 1980 as 'Scramble' to place 6th, with a song written by the composer of the 1979 UK Eurovision entry, Peter Morris.
- Ronnie Carroll, Cheryl Baker and Sally-Ann Triplett are the only singers to win the A Song for Europe contest twice. Cliff Richard represented the UK twice but he was chosen by the BBC to sing the UK entry internally, with the public choosing his song from a shortlist. Similarly, James Newman was internally selected by the BBC to sing the UK entry in both 2020 and 2021, although the 2020 Eurovision contest was later cancelled due to the COVID-19 pandemic. Baker was a member of Co-Co in 1978 and Bucks Fizz in 1981. In addition, Baker took part in two UK finals as part of Co-Co in 1976 and The Main Event in 1980. Triplett was part of Prima Donna in 1980 and Bardo in 1982.
- Sally-Ann Triplett is the only multiple contender to win the contest at all attempts.
- Cheryl Baker and Gina G are the only artists from multi-artist contests to finish both first and last. Baker did so in consecutive years, 1980 and 1981. Gina G is the only solo returning winner to finish last, albeit being fifth in a field of five.
- Ronnie Carroll and James Newman are the only artists to represent the UK at Eurovision in consecutive years, although Newman did not get to participate in the cancelled 2020 competition.
- Singers who have won the A Song for Europe contest and later returned to take part again, are Pearl Carr and Teddy Johnson, Bryan Johnson, Ronnie Carroll, Lyn Paul of The New Seekers, Terry Bradford, Keith Hasler and Cheryl Baker of Co-Co (renaming themselves The Main Event), Sally-Ann Triplett, Lance Aston & Jane Robbins of Prima Donna and Gina G. Bryan Johnson, Ronnie Carroll, the same members of Co-Co and Bobby McVay, the lead singer of 1983 winning group Sweet Dreams, had entered the contest prior to winning. Johnson in 1959, Carroll in 1960, Co-Co in 1976 and McVay in 1982 as the lead singer of Lovin' Feeling.
- Including backing singers and musicians, several other artists have represented the UK multiple times without credit. The Ladybirds sang backing vocals for the UK entry in 1967, 1974 and 1977. The Breakaways were the backing singers in 1968 and 1971 and additionally sang backing vocals for the 1977 Israeli entry. Lavinia Rodgers joined The Breakaways for backing vocal duty at the 1971 Eurovision final, backing her sister Clodagh and later took part in the 1982 UK final as a member of 'Good Looks'. (Likewise, Sonia also had her sister perform backing vocals at the 1993 Eurovision final, the second of only three siblings ever to represent the UK at Eurovision.) Sisters Sue and Sunny sang backing vocals in 1969 and 1985, also singing the German backing vocals in 1975. One half of Sunny and Sue (Sue Glover) was the lead singer of the group 'Unity' who took part in the 1981 UK final. Brian Bennett sang backing vocals in 1970, before drumming with his group The Shadows representing the UK in 1975. John Farrar and Alan Tarney backed Cliff Richard in 1973 and both were short lived members of The Shadows in 1975. Kit Rolfe was the lead singer of Belle and the Devotions in 1984 and provided off screen backing vocals for the 1983 and 1991 UK entries, as did Hazell Dean. Miriam Stockley was a backing vocalist for the UK in both 1990 and 1997. Bobby G of Bucks Fizz sang the backing vocals for Bardo at the 1982 A Song for Europe contest, but was unavailable to do the same at the Eurovision final in Harrogate. Nichola Martin was a member of both 'Rags' in the 1977 A Song for Europe and 'Gem' (aka 'Paris') in 1981. Martin sang backing vocals for Bucks Fizz at the Eurovision Song Contest 1981, albeit off-camera. Des Dyer failed to win the Song for Europe contest in both 1983 (with 'Casablanca') and 1985, but sang backing vocals for Scott Fitzgerald at the Eurovision Song Contest 1988, alongside Julie Forsyth and Dominic Grant, who with 'Guys & Dolls' had taken part in the 1979 UK final. Sam Blue was one of the UK's backing singers at Eurovision 1990 and he twice took part in the UK heats in his own right; as lead singer of 'Essenes' in 1996 and as a soloist in 1997. Emily Reed finished second in the 2003 UK final and was later one of Daz Sampson's backing singers at the 2006 Eurovision final.
- Brothers Teddy and Bryan Johnson were the first siblings to represent the UK in 1959 and 1960 respectively. After sisters Sue and Sunny performed backing vocals for Lulu at Eurovision 1969, the other siblings to represent the UK were Jane and Kate Robbins (with Prima Donna) in 1980; Lance Aston (Prima Donna) and Jay Aston (Bucks Fizz); while Pam Evans sang backing vocals for her sister Sonia in 1993.
- Pearl Carr and Teddy Johnson are the only married couple to win the Song for Europe competition and represent the UK at Eurovision, although Dominic Grant and Julie Forsyth sung backing vocals uncredited in 1988. Martin Lee and Sandra Stevens, of Brotherhood of Man, married some time after winning Eurovision 1976. Eve Graham (of The New Seekers) and Danny Finn (of Prima Donna) married after Graham's appearance in the 1972 contest and before Finn appeared in 1980. Stephanie de Sykes and Stuart Slater twice won the Song for Europe contest as a songwriting team, but despite always being described as husband and wife, they were in actuality not married to each other.
- Terry Wogan has hosted the contest more times than any other presenter and he also hosted the Eurovision Song Contest itself, as did two other hosts of the UK heats and finals; Katie Boyle and Ulrika Jonsson. Angela Rippon hosted the Eurovision Song Contest 1977 and was the Bristol jury spokesperson at the 1986 and 1987 A Song for Europe shows.
- Cilla Black hosted both the 1968 and 1973 contests when the show was a segment of her BBC1 variety series. Black was the original choice to sing the UK entry in 1968, but turned it down as she felt it unlikely the UK could score back-to-back wins. She also turned down the chance in 1970 as she was expecting her first child. Other singers who were reported to have turned down the invitation include Slade and Peters and Lee in the 1970s, Bucks Fizz in 1986 and Elaine Paige in the 1990s. Bonnie Tyler was invited to represent the UK for 1985, but was unavailable. Tyler finally represented the UK in 2013.
- When Belle and the Devotions were booed from the stage at Eurovision 1984, the BBC wanted to revert to inviting one singer to perform all the songs in the A Song For Europe contest for 1985. After Bonnie Tyler was unavailable, Lena Zavaroni was approached by the BBC. This move was blocked by the Music Publishers Association, who preferred to let the writers choose their own performers. In the end, for 1985, only soloists or duets were permitted to take part – no "made for Eurovision" acts – with songwriters limited to two entries each. This rule was only in place for one year.
- Malcolm Roberts tried to represent the UK in 1991, having previously represented Luxembourg at Eurovision in 1985. Katrina Leskanich won Eurovision in 1997 for the UK and later attempted to represent Sweden. Nanne Grönvall represented Sweden in 1996 with the group One More Time before attempting to represent the UK in 2001. Simon Foster (aka Dan Duskey) represented Ireland in the 1982 Eurovision final as part of The Duskeys, before leading the group Palace (as Michael Palace) in the 1986 A Song For Europe contest. Ray Caruana, the lead singer of Live Report who represented the UK at Eurovision in 1989, later tried to represent Malta in the 1994 contest, but failed to win the Maltese heat.
- Songs that failed to make the UK final but still went on to be hits include "Even the Bad Times Are Good". This was entered for Sandie Shaw in 1967 but went on to reach #4 for The Tremeloes, as did 1968 reject "Hello World", which reached #14. "Turn On The Sun" was turned down for Mary Hopkin in 1970 but later became identified with Nana Mouskouri. Likewise in 1971, "Something Old, Something New" failed to make Clodagh Rodgers' final six but was released by The Fantastics, reaching #9. Andrew Lloyd Webber and Tim Rice submitted a song for the 1969 contest, "Try It and See", which was rejected. It was later re-written and became "King Herod's Song" in the musical Jesus Christ Superstar. Lloyd Webber returned to compose the 2009 UK entry, "It's My Time", in collaboration with Diane Warren.

== See also ==
- United Kingdom in the Eurovision Song Contest
- UK Eurovision Song Contest entries discography

== Notes and references ==
=== Works cited ===
- Roxburgh, Gordon (2020). Songs for Europe: The United Kingdom at the Eurovision Song Contest. Vol. Four: The 1990s. Prestatyn: Telos Publishing. ISBN 978-1-84583-163-9.
