= Jane Robbins (sculptor) =

British sculptor

Jane Robbins (born 1962) is a sculptor. She works in cast bronze, resin and also other materials, primarily to make figurative and portrait sculptures. Her sculptures have been commissioned as public art in the UK as well as private works.

== Early life and education ==
Jane Robbins was born in 1962. She trained initially at the Guildhall School of Music & Drama and later studied traditional figurative sculpture at the Stafford Art College.

== Career ==
For a short time Robbins, along with her sister Kate and others were the group Prima Donna. In 1980 the group represented the UK in the Eurovision Song Contest, finishing in third place with the song Love Enough for Two.

Robbins career started as working in theatre and television to produce props and sets, making use of sculpting and painting Her practice has developed into primarily making commissions of figurative and portrait sculptures in bronze or resin, along with some continuing work for television (e.g. props for In the Night Garden... on BBC). Her bronze sculptures are cast in mid-Wales.

Her monumental cast bronze sculptures include: Fred Dibnah, 9 feet (2.7 m) tall, located Oxford Street in Bolton; a seated life size statue of Linda McCartney holding a lamb (2002) installed in the grounds of the Campbeltown Museum, on the Kintyre peninsula in Scotland; a bust of Ken Dodd that is now in Liverpool Central Library and a statue of the cartoon character Andy Capp standing in a small park between Croft Terrace and York Place, Hartlepool, County Durham. In 2010 a sculpture by Robbins of a miner was installed to commemorate the 100th anniversary of the Pretoria Pit disaster at a coalmine in Lancashire.

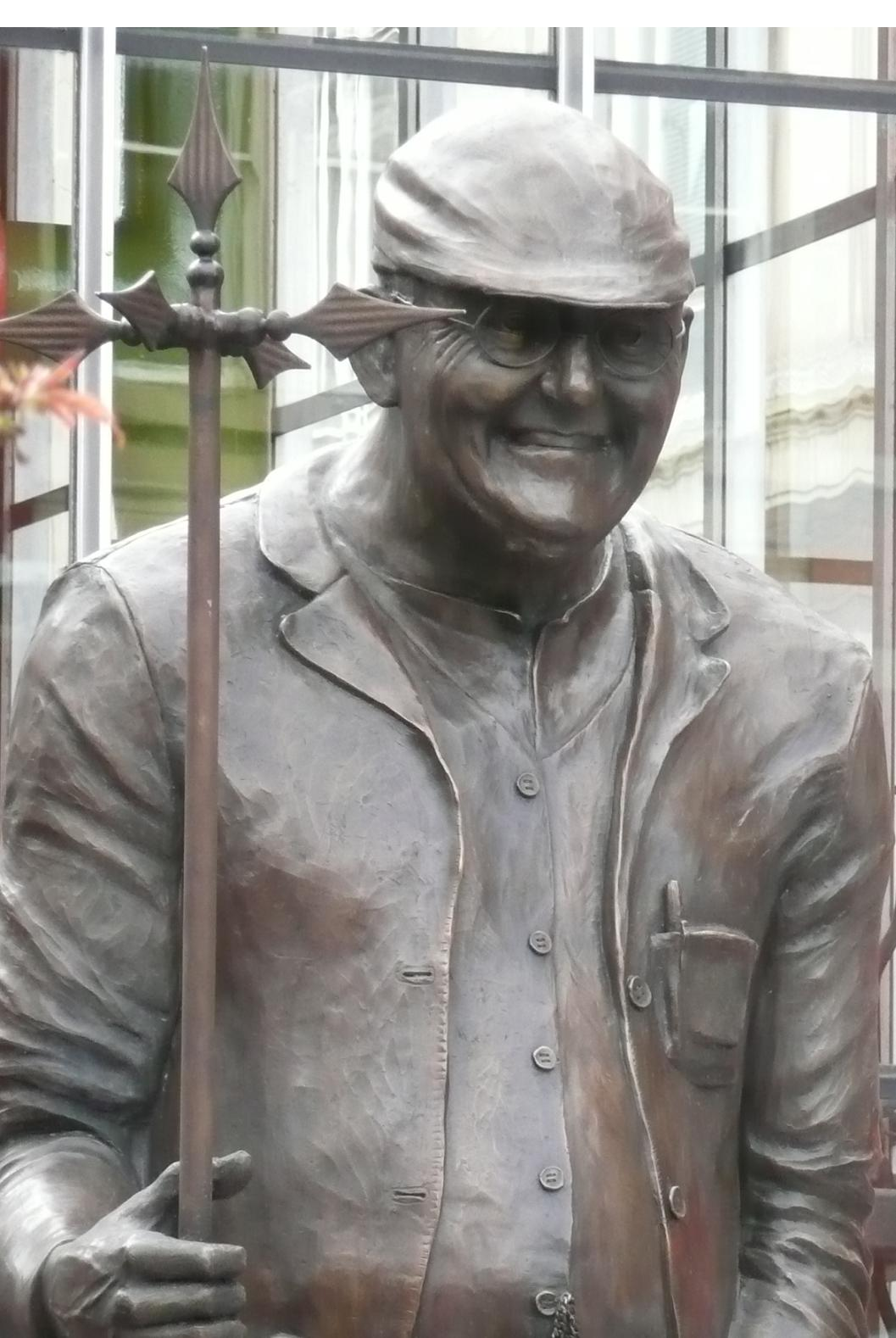
Statue of Fred Dibnah, steeplejack and TV personality, in Bolton

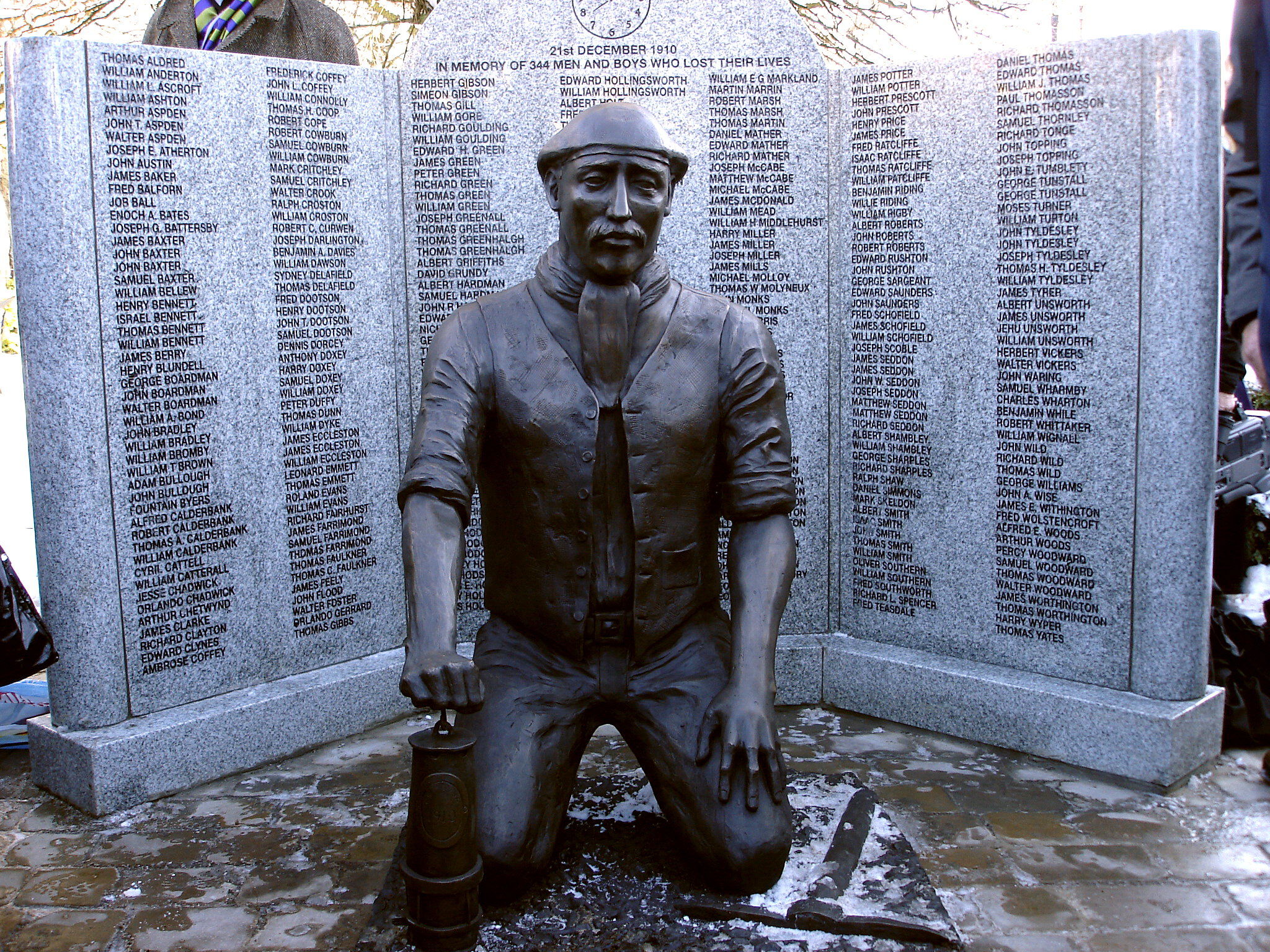
Memorial to the 344 Pretoria Pit miners in Lancashire killed 12 December 1910

She was commissioned by the Monumental Welsh Women project to make a statue of Margaret Haig Thomas, 2nd Viscountess Rhondda, businesswoman and suffragette, which was installed in Newport in 2024.
