= Stephen Fischer =

British singer

Stephen Fischer (a.k.a. Stephen Fletcher) is a British singer and participant in the 1982 Eurovision Song Contest as part of the duo Bardo. He is married with two children and lived in London.

Fischer and Sally Ann Triplett (who were a couple in real life at the time) represented United Kingdom in the Eurovision Song Contest 1982 as the double act Bardo. The entry song, "One Step Further" finished seventh in the contest, but reached No. 2 in the UK Singles Chart.

Fischer was originally suggested to join the original Bucks Fizz line-up for the 1981 Eurovision entry, but was unavailable due to his contract with the musical Godspell. He has also worked with Bob Geldof, Debbie McGee, Boy George, Paul Brady, Murray Head and the Penguin Cafe Orchestra as a keyboard player and singer.
