= Maggie Moone =

British singer

- Born: Sandra Lippitt; Birmingham, England
- Website: http://www.maggiemoone.com/

Maggie Moone (born Sandra Lippitt) is a British singer, best remembered for her role on the UK version of Name That Tune.

Sandra Lippitt was born in Aston, Birmingham, to a fireman father. In 1978, Moone released "I'll Put You Together Again", which peaked at number 98 in Australia.

In 1980 she participated in A Song For Europe, aiming to become the United Kingdom's entry to that year's Eurovision Song Contest to be staged in The Hague, The Netherlands. Her song "Happy Everything", was defeated by Prima Donna singing "Love Enough For Two", who won the UK heat. The voting sequence had ended in a tie, with the 14 regional juries having awarded both songs the same score. In an unrehearsed panic, host Terry Wogan called back each of the juries to cast one deciding vote for either song. Some juries simply gave their casting vote to the song that had received their higher mark. Others opted for a show of hands. In some cases, the juries contradicted the marks they had given earlier. In addition, the scoreboard was unable to keep up with this sudden death voting. In the final count, Moone lost by 8 juries to 6 and, as such, she failed to go to The Hague. A detailed check of the votes after the show confirmed that this was the correct result, despite all the on-screen confusion.

Her first husband was Colin Davies; she married secondly, in 2004, Sir William Edward Doran Gibbons, 9th Baronet.

Preceded by (Germany) Paola	OGAE Second Chance Contest winner Retrospective; 1980	Succeeded by (United Kingdom) Liquid Gold
