= SuRie =

English singer (born 1989)

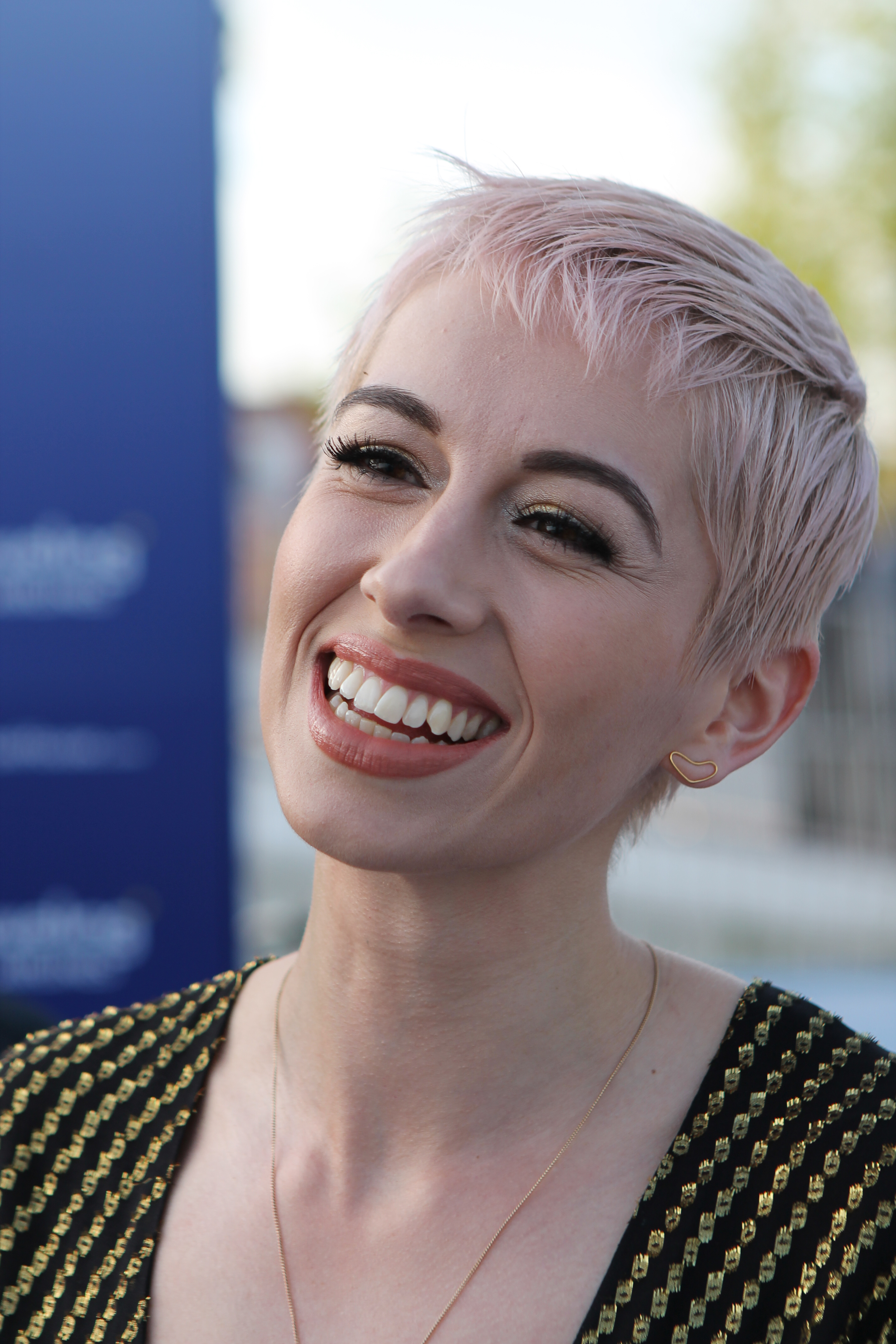
- SuRie in 2018

Background information
- Born: Susanna Marie Cork; 18 February 1989 (age 37); Harlow, Essex, England
- Origin: Bishop's Stortford, England
- Occupations: Singer; songwriter
- Years active: 2015–present
- Labels: MMP; Scarlett Audio
- Website: www.surie.me

Susanna Marie Cork (born 18 February 1989), known professionally as SuRie, is an English singer and songwriter. She was born in Harlow, Essex, and raised in Bishop's Stortford, Hertfordshire.

== Early life and career ==
SuRie was born Susanna Marie Cork to Andrew Cork and Julia (née Kornberg). Her maternal grandfather, Sir Hans Kornberg, is a German-born British-American biochemist, whose own parents were murdered in the Holocaust. Her stage name SuRie is a combination of first names Susanna Marie. SuRie attended Hills Road Sixth Form College and later graduated from the Royal Academy of Music. Initially trained classically, she can play piano and oboe. She also trained as a vocalist. She started writing at 12-years-old. She has had residencies in Jazz lounges in London. Her younger brother is singer-songwriter Benedict Cork.

She performed in front of the former Prince of Wales as a child soloist and appeared in different British venues such as The Royal Albert Hall and St. Paul's Cathedral and at venues all around the world, including St. Mark's Basilica in Venice.

=== Eurovision Song Contest 2018 ===
In January 2018, SuRie was confirmed as one of six artists competing in Eurovision: You Decide, the British national selection show for the Eurovision Song Contest 2018. On 7 February 2018, she won the show with the song "Storm", written and composed by Nicole Blair, Gil Lewis, and Sean Hargreaves, and represented the United Kingdom in the Eurovision Song Contest 2018 in Lisbon.

SuRie greets from Eurovision Spain PreParty in Madrid (2018)

She has a previous experience in the contest, as a backing vocalist and dancer for Loïc Nottet who represented Belgium in Eurovision 2015 in Vienna, Austria with "Rhythm Inside" and she also appeared as a musical director for Blanche’s "City Lights" in Kyiv, Ukraine in Eurovision 2017.

As the United Kingdom is a member of the "Big Five", SuRie automatically qualified to the grand final of the contest, which took place on 12 May 2018 in Lisbon after Salvador Sobral's win in 2017.

SuRie's performance in the final was disrupted by Dr ACactivism who grabbed her microphone and shouted "Modern nazis of the UK media, we demand freedom, war is not peace." She was able to complete her performance, and the broadcast cut to an unscheduled interview in the green room following the song. As a result, SuRie was given permission to perform again after the final performance, but she subsequently declined to do so, saying she was proud of her one performance.

== Discography ==
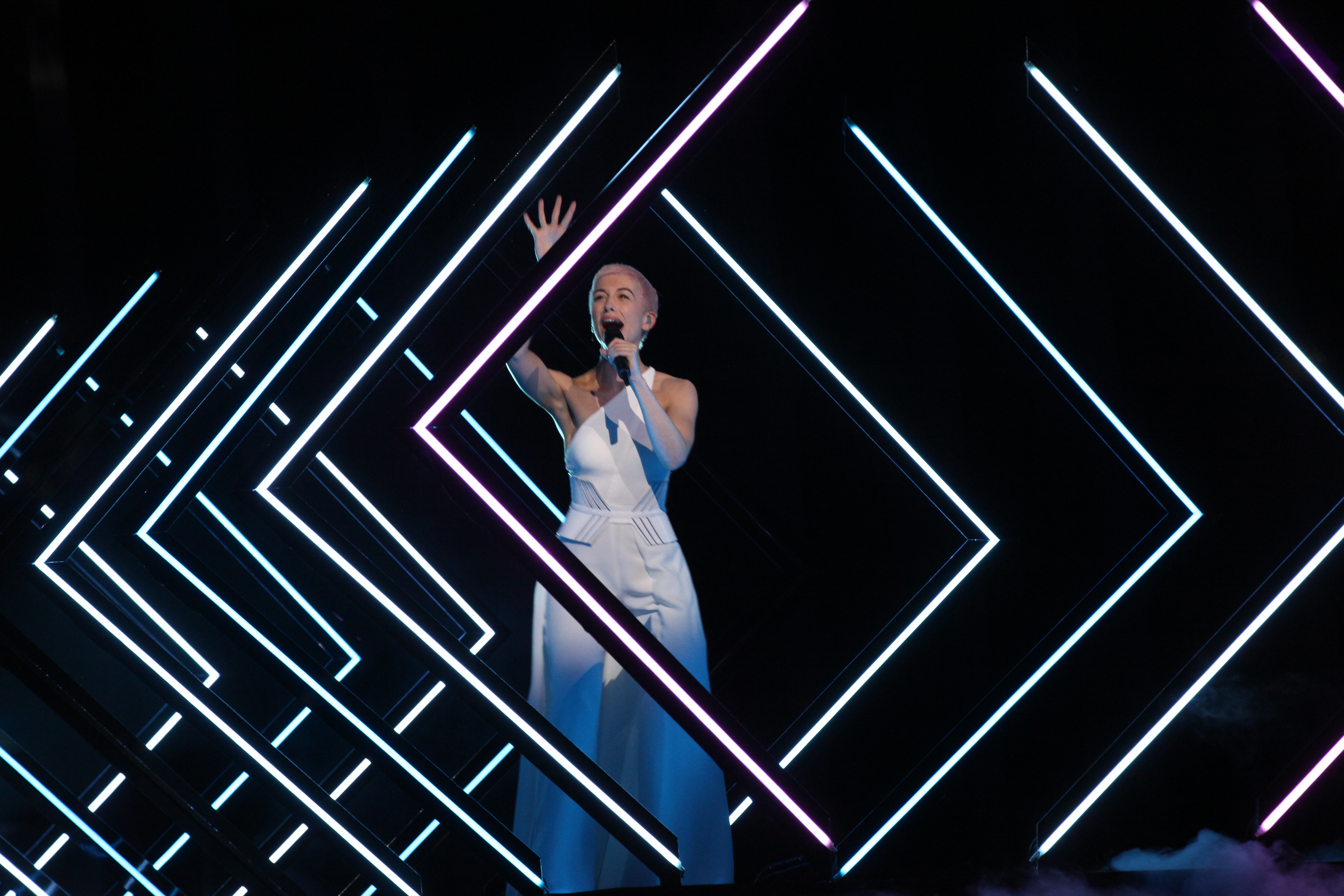
SuRie performing at ESC 2018

=== Studio albums ===
| Title | Details |
|---|---|
| Something Beginning With ... | Released: 2 December 2016; Label: MMP; Format: Digital download, CD |
| Dozen | Released: 18 February 2019; Label: MMP; Format: Digital download, CD |
| Building A Woman | Released: 14 May 2023; Label: MMP; Format: Digital download, CD, Vinyl |

=== Extended plays ===
| Title | Details |
|---|---|
| Rye | Released: 15 May 2020; Label: MMP; Format: Digital download |

=== Singles ===
| Title | Year | Peak chart positions | | Album |
| Title | Year | UK | FRA | Album |
|---|---|---|---|---|
| "Lover, You Should've Come Over" | 2017 | — | — | Non-album singles |
| "Storm" | 2018 | 50 | 103 | Non-album singles |
| "Taking It Over" | 2018 | — | — | Non-album singles |
| "Only You and I" | 2019 | — | — | Non-album singles |
| "Last Christmas" | 2020 | — | — | Non-album singles |
| "Best of You" | 2022 | — | — | Non-album singles |
| "Somebody" | 2022 | — | — | Non-album singles |
| "Who Do You Think You Are" | 2022 | — | — | Non-album singles |
| "They Won't Go When I Go" | 2022 | — | — | Non-album singles |
| "Best of You" | 2023 | — | — | Non-album singles |
| "Because the Night" | 2023 | — | — | Non-album singles |
| "When It All Goes Quiet" | 2023 | — | — | Building A Woman |
| "Treading Water" | 2023 | — | — | Building A Woman |
"—" denotes a single that did not chart or was not released.

| Preceded by Lucie Jones with "Never Give Up on You" | United Kingdom in the Eurovision Song Contest; 2018 | Succeeded by Michael Rice with "Bigger than Us" |
