= Co-Co (band) =

British band

- Also known as: Mothers Pride; The Main Event
- Origin: United Kingdom
- Genres: Pop
- Years active: 1974–1980
- Labels: Pye; Ariola/Hansa; RCA; Carrere
- Past members: Terry Bradford; Josie Andrews; Cheryl Baker; Keith Hasler; Paul Rogers; Peter Perrera; Charlie Brennan; Helen Bailey; Vivien Banks; Sue Lane

Co-Co was a six-piece British band which represented the United Kingdom in the Eurovision Song Contest 1978, staged at the Palais de Congrès in Paris, France, on 22 April 1978, with the song "The Bad Old Days". The song was written by the song writing team Stephanie de Sykes and Stuart Slater (aka Stewart James). It was finally placed eleventh of the 20 entries, which at the time was the worst showing ever for a UK entry. It would not be until 1987 that any British song fared worse in Eurovision. The group were originally called Mothers Pride.

== Eurovision ==
At the time, the group consisted of Terry Bradford, Josie Andrews, Cheryl Baker, Keith Hasler and Paul Rogers. For their performance in Paris, a drummer named Charlie Brennan was added to the group. They won the preliminary heat A Song for Europe, having previously placed second, again as a quintet, but with only Bradford, Hasler and Baker in the original line-up, together with Peter Perrera and another female singer, Vivien Banks (who would later join The New Seekers) when they appeared in the 1976 UK final, singing Wake Up written by the Arrows I Love Rock 'n' Roll songwriting team of Alan Merrill and Jake Hooker. Perrera appeared in the 1976 contest with a shaved head, having promised his bandmates he would go bald if they made the final. Additionally, the group returned as a quartet (minus Andrews and Rogers, but with a new female singer Helen Bailey) as The Main Event, for the 1980 A Song for Europe contest. Oddly, despite this new line-up, Josie Andrews still appeared on stage with the group, providing backing vocals to the main quartet. On this occasion they placed last with the song Gonna Do My Best, written by Bradford. Bradford also wrote a song for the 1979 UK final, Harry, My Honolulu Lover, performed by The Nolan Sisters, which placed fourth, having originally been recorded as a demo by Co-Co featuring vocals by Cheryl Baker. Stephanie de Sykes and Stuart Slater went on to win the A Song for Europe contest a second time, in 1980, with the song Love Enough for Two performed by Prima Donna, ironically beating the new line up of Co-Co in the process.

== Cheryl Baker in Bucks Fizz ==
In 1981, Cheryl Baker returned to the UK contest, as part of the group Bucks Fizz. When Bucks Fizz won the UK final, Baker thus became only the third singer ever to represent the UK twice, following in the footsteps of Ronnie Carroll and Cliff Richard. When Bucks Fizz went on to win the Eurovision Song Contest 1981 with the song "Making Your Mind Up", Baker became one of the few artists to take part in Eurovision to win at their second attempt. According to The Eurovision Song Contest - The Official History by John Kennedy O'Connor, Baker also made the second biggest improvement by a Eurovision competitor in the contest, moving up from eleventh in 1978 to first in 1981.

== Post Eurovision ==
"The Bad Old Days" reached number 13 on the UK Singles Chart. The group had no further hit singles, and only released one album, Bad Old Days in 1978.

Bradford and Hasler continued to work together long after the group's demise in 1980 and are writing and producing new work in the 21st century. In 2020, together with Sussie Arvesen, they released several new tracks including "Road to the Unknown" as COCO featuring Terry Bradford, Sussie Arvesen & Keith Hasler.

== Discography ==
=== Albums ===
Co-Co

- 1978 – Bad Old Days (Hansa International)

=== Singles ===
Mothers Pride

- 1974 – "Follow the Man with the Music" (Pye)
- 1975 – "Oh Well, Oh Well" (Pye)

Co-Co

- 1976 – "Wake Up" (Pye)
- 1976 – "Don't Push Me 'Round" (Pye)
- 1977 – "Money Song" (Ariola)
- 1978 – "Bad Old Days" (Ariola)
- 1978 – "I Can't Talk Love on the Telephone" (Ariola)
- 1978 – "Way Out" (Ariola)
- 1980 – "Keep On Dancing" (RCA)

The Main Event

- 1980 – "Gonna Do My Best" (Carrere)

Awards and achievements
| Preceded by Lynsey de Paul and Mike Moran with "Rock Bottom" | UK in the Eurovision Song Contest; 1978 | Succeeded by Black Lace with "Mary Ann" |
