= Prima Donna (British band) =

British band

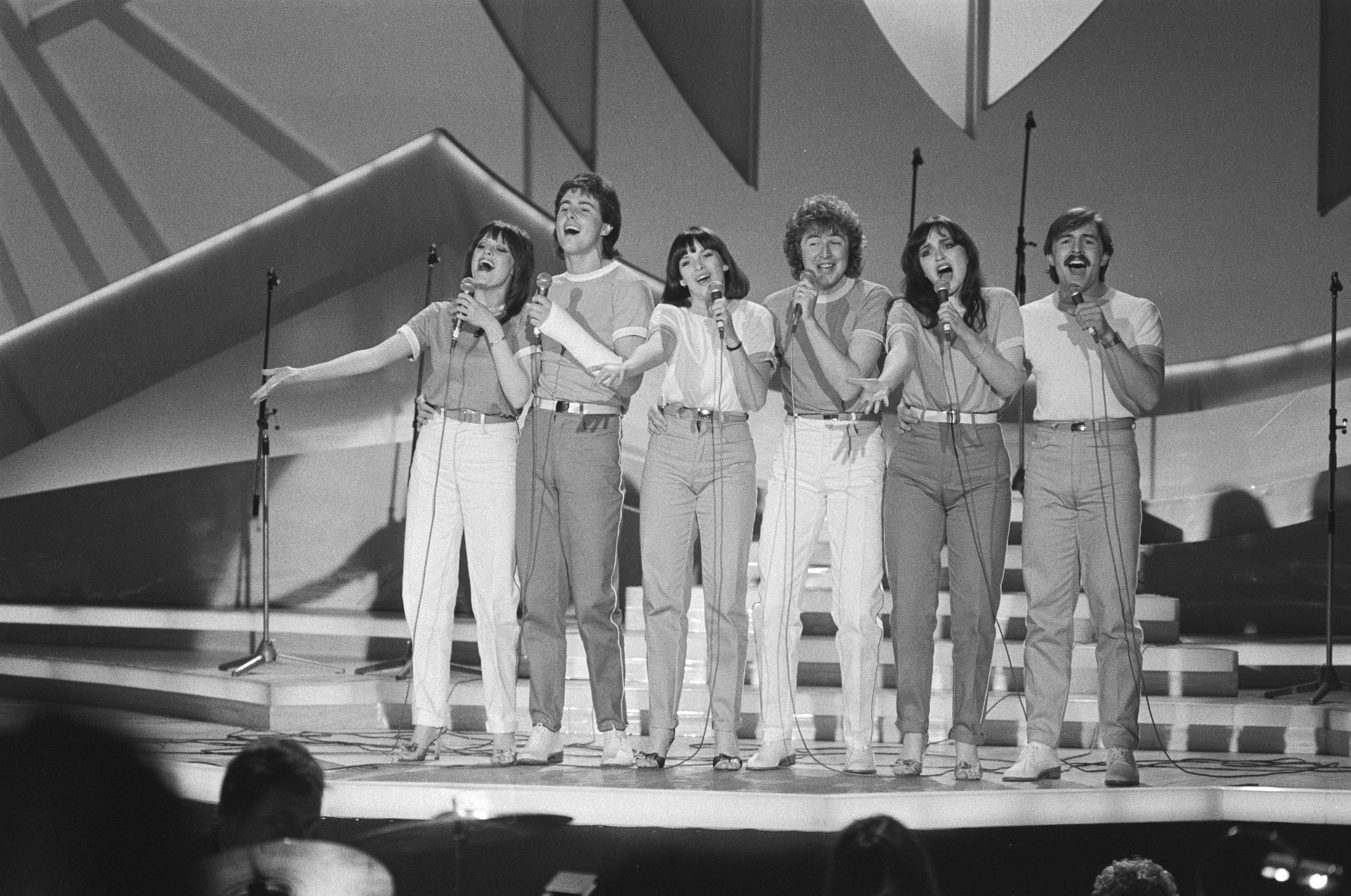
- Prima Donna during rehearsal for Eurovision Song Contest 1980

Background information
- Origin: United Kingdom
- Genres: Pop
- Years active: 1980–1981
- Label: Ariola
- Past members: Kate Robbins; Jane Robbins; Danny Finn; Sally Ann Triplett; Alan Coates; Lance Aston

Prima Donna were the United Kingdom representatives in the Eurovision Song Contest 1980. The group comprised sisters Kate and Jane Robbins, Sally Ann Triplett, Danny Finn, Alan Coates and Lance Aston (brother of Jay Aston, who performed with Bucks Fizz, the following year's contest winners). Finn was a former member of The New Seekers and was married to fellow ex-New Seeker Eve Graham. Robbins later embarked on a successful career as a comedian, impressionist and actress.

== Career ==
Prima Donna performed the song "Love Enough for Two" which finished in third place, with 106 points. The song was written and composed by Stephanie de Sykes and Stuart Slater. It was their second entry to reach the Eurovision final, having also composed "The Bad Old Days" in 1978 for Co-Co (which until 1987, was the worst placed UK entry in Eurovision history).

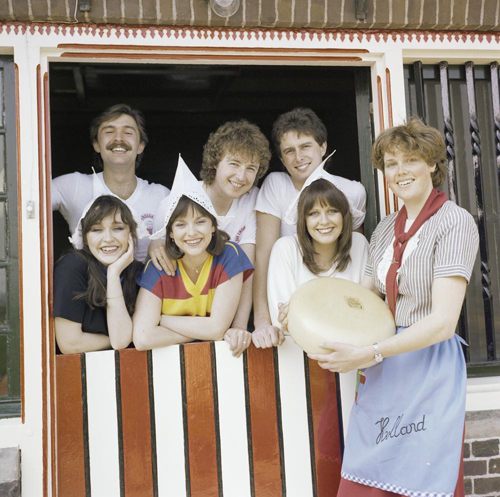
Prima Donna during postcard filming for Eurovision 1980

Their journey to the Eurovision Song Contest final in The Hague was not straightforward. They only won the UK heat A Song For Europe after a countback after the initial regional voting had placed them joint first with Maggie Moone. In an unrehearsed panic, host Terry Wogan asked each of the fourteen regional juries to cast a single vote for which of the songs they preferred. Some juries voted against the way they had earlier in the show and with the scoreboard unable to keep up, the entire process descended into farce. Regardless, Prima Donna were declared the winners and went forward to Eurovision.

Triplett is one of only four singers to have sung for the United Kingdom in the competition twice, alongside Ronnie Carroll, Cliff Richard and Cheryl Baker of Bucks Fizz. O'Connor also noted that this was the first UK entry, since 1964, not to make the UK Singles Chart prior to the Eurovision final, eventually peaking there at #48. The group released one more single in September 1980, "Just Got to be You", but failed to chart. They disbanded soon after, with member Kate Robbins scoring a UK No.2 hit single a few months later.

== After Prima Donna ==
Triplett returned to Eurovision in 1982, as one half of the group Bardo, who although did not win scored a big hit with the song "One Step Further", which reached No.2 in the UK Singles Chart. Aston tried again to reach the Eurovision final, performing with another ex-New Seeker Kathryn Ann Rae, in the 1983 A Song For Europe contest, as part of the group Audio. They finished fourth of the eight shortlisted entries with the song "Love On Your Mind", written by Trevor Spencer and Marty Kristian, another New Seeker. Jane Robbins', sister, Emma Robbins, also had another attempt at the UK Eurovision ticket, in 1989 as part of female quartet The Pearls. They were also placed fourth of eight entries in the contest with the song "Love Come Down". Danny (real name Kevin) Finn periodically toured the UK with wife Eve Graham, and later worked at a theme park design company. He died in February 2016. Alan Coates went on to be a songwriter, while Kate Robbins forged a successful career as a singer, actress and comedian.

== Discography ==
=== Singles ===
They only released two singles:

- Love Enough For Two / Missing Out On Love (1980)
- Just Got To Be You / Let's Take Our Chances (1980)

Awards and achievements
| Preceded by Black Lace with "Mary Ann" | UK in the Eurovision Song Contest; 1980 | Succeeded by Bucks Fizz with "Making Your Mind Up" |
