= Storm (SuRie song) =

2018 song by SuRie

Single by SuRie
- Released: 7 March 2018
- Recorded: 2017
- Genre: Dance-pop
- Length: 2:57
- Label: MMP
- Songwriter(s): Nicole Blair; Gil Lewis; Sean Hargreaves

SuRie singles chronology
"Lover, You Should've Come Over" (2017)	"Storm" (2018)	"Taking It Over" (2018)

Music video
- "Storm" on YouTube

Eurovision Song Contest 2018 entry
- Country: United Kingdom
- Artist(s): SuRie
- Language: English
- Composer(s): Nicole Blair, Gil Lewis, Sean Hargreaves
- Lyricist(s): Nicole Blair, Gil Lewis, Sean Hargreaves

Finals performance
- Final result: 24th
- Final points: 48

Entry chronology
- ◄ "Never Give Up on You" (2017)
- "Bigger than Us" (2019) ►

"Storm" is a song performed by singer SuRie, and represented the United Kingdom in the Eurovision Song Contest 2018 in Lisbon, Portugal. The song is written and composed by Nicole Blair, Gil Lewis and Sean Hargreaves. An updated version was released as a download on 7 March. It peaked at number 50 on the UK Singles Chart.

== Eurovision Song Contest ==
SuRie was announced as the British act for the 2018 contest on 7 February 2018, after being selected to represent the United Kingdom on Eurovision: You Decide. As the United Kingdom is a member of the Big Five, SuRie directly qualified for and performed in the final of the Eurovision Song Contest on 12 May 2018.

During her performance of the song at the final, SuRie's microphone was taken by a stage invader, who then yelled into the microphone "modern Nazis of the UK media, we demand freedom, war is not peace", before being dragged offstage by security and taken into custody shortly afterwards. She was given the opportunity to perform again by the EBU but declined, stating that she was proud of her performance."

== Track listing ==
Digital download
No.	Title	Length
1.	"Storm"	2:57

Instrumental
No.	Title	Length
1.	"Storm" (Instrumental)	2.57

7th Heaven Club Mix
No.	Title	Length
1.	"Storm" (7th Heaven Club Mix)	6.52

7th Heaven Radio Edit
No.	Title	Length
1.	"Storm" (7th Heaven Radio Edit)	3.30

Acoustic
No.	Title	Length
1.	"Storm" (Acoustic)	2.35

== Charts ==
Chart (2018)	Peak position
Euro Digital Songs (Billboard)	18
Scotland (OCC)	13
UK Singles (OCC)	50

== Release history ==
Region	Date	Format	Label
United Kingdom	7 March 2018	Digital download	MMP
