= Bigger than Us (Michael Rice song) =

2019 single by Michael Rice

Single by Michael Rice
- Released: 8 March 2019
- Recorded: 2018
- Length: 2:58
- Label: Spinnup
- Songwriters: Laurell Barker; Anna-Klara Folin; John Lundvik; Jonas Thander

Michael Rice singles chronology
"Bruised" (2018)	"Bigger than Us" (2019)	"Somebody" (2019)

Music video
- "Bigger than Us" on YouTube

Eurovision Song Contest 2019 entry
- Country: United Kingdom
- Artist: Michael Rice
- Language: English
- Composers: Laurell Barker; Anna-Klara Folin; John Lundvik; Jonas Thander
- Lyricists: Laurell Barker; Anna-Klara Folin; John Lundvik; Jonas Thander

Finals performance
- Final result: 26th
- Final points: 11

Entry chronology
- ◄ "Storm" (2018)
- "My Last Breath" (2020) ►

"Bigger than Us" is a song written by Laurell Barker, Anna-Klara Folin, Jonas Thander, and John Lundvik and performed by Michael Rice. He performed the song at the Eurovision Song Contest 2019, and came in 26th place. The song was chosen on 8 February 2019 at BBC's national selection show Eurovision: You Decide. The song was used as the theme music for the Pride of Britain Awards 2019 and 2020.

== At Eurovision ==
=== Eurovision: You Decide ===
The song was chosen at Eurovision: You Decide by the British public and three judges selected by the BBC. After receiving confirmation from the three judges, Michael won the final, beating Jordan Clarke with the song "Freaks" and Kerrie-Anne with the song "Sweet Lies".

The song was originally chosen for Melodifestivalen 2019 to be performed by Swedish singer-songwriter John Lundvik, however Lundvik decided on another song and entered "Bigger than Us" to Eurovision: You Decide as a songwriter.

Lundvik won Melodifestivalen 2019 with his song "Too Late for Love", and competed against "Bigger than Us" in the Eurovision Song Contest 2019. Lundvik finished 5th.

=== In Tel Aviv ===
As the United Kingdom is a member of the "Big Five", the song automatically advanced to the grand final, which was held on 18 May 2019 at the Expo Tel Aviv in pavilion 2.

=== Grand Final ===
The song finished 26th with a total of 11 points in the Eurovision Song Contest 2019 grand final in Tel Aviv, becoming the 4th act from the United Kingdom to finish last in the grand final.

== Critical reception ==
Charlotte Runcie of The Daily Telegraph approved of the choice of song for the United Kingdom's Eurovision entry, praising Michael Rice's vocals and calling the track "a perfectly respectable Eurovision-friendly power ballad with a key change. Nothing special but, crucially, nothing embarrassing."

== Charts ==
Chart (2019)	Peak position
Scottish Singles Sales (Official Charts)	35
Sweden Heatseeker (Sverigetopplistan)	8
UK Singles Downloads (Official Charts)	27
