= One Step Further =

1982 single by Bardo

Single by Bardo
- B-side: "Lady of the Night"
- Released: 2 April 1982
- Genre: New pop
- Length: 3:00
- Label: Epic
- Songwriter: Simon Jefferis
- Producer: Andy Hill

Eurovision Song Contest 1982 entry
- Country: United Kingdom
- Artists: Sally Ann Triplett, Stephen Fischer
- As: Bardo
- Language: English
- Composer: Simon Jefferis
- Conductor: Ronnie Hazlehurst

Finals performance
- Final result: 7th
- Final points: 76

Entry chronology
- ◄ "Making Your Mind Up" (1981)
- "I'm Never Giving Up" (1983) ►

"One Step Further", written by Simon Jefferis, was the United Kingdom's entry at the Eurovision Song Contest 1982, performed by the duo Bardo, comprising Sally Ann Triplett and Stephen Fischer.

== Background ==
Bardo were chosen to perform at the 1982 Eurovision Song Contest in Harrogate by winning the UK national final, A Song for Europe. On the day of the main contest, bookmakers Ladbrokes rated the song as the favourite to win at odds of 5–2. Commentator Terry Wogan also thought the song would be the "outright winner". DJ and well-known Eurovision fan John Peel stated in an interview that "One Step Further" was his favourite Eurovision song of all time.

At Harrogate, the song was performed fourth on the night. At the end of judging that evening, "One Step Further" finished in seventh place with 76 points. Luxembourg and Austria both awarded Bardo the maximum 12 points that night.

At the night of the contest itself, the orchestra played the tune in a retro style. The single version and subsequent live versions used many electronic musical instruments popular in the early 1980s and had more of a contemporary feel than many Eurovision entries.

After Eurovision, the song reached No. 2 on the UK Singles Chart. No further UK Eurovision entries would chart so highly until 1996. The song was the 75th-best-selling single of 1982 in the UK, achieving a Silver disc for sales of over 250,000.

The song was featured in episode one of the second series of Peter Kay's Car Share, which was first broadcast on BBC One on 11 April 2017.

== Charts ==
Chart performance for "One Step Further"
Chart (1982)	Peak position
UK Singles (OCC)	2

irl 5
