= Mary Ann (Black Lace song) =

1979 song by Black Lace

Single by Black Lace
- Released: 1979
- Songwriter: Peter Morris

Eurovision Song Contest 1979 entry
- Country: United Kingdom
- Artists: Alan Barton; Colin Routh; Terry Dobson; Steve Scholey
- As: Black Lace
- Language: English
- Composer: Peter Morris
- Lyricist: Peter Morris
- Conductor: Ken Jones

Finals performance
- Final result: 7th
- Final points: 73
- ◄ "The Bad Old Days" (1978)
- "Love Enough for Two" (1980) ►

"Mary Ann" is a song written by Peter Morris and performed by Black Lace. It represented the United Kingdom in the Eurovision Song Contest 1979.

The song is about a man who is estranged from his girlfriend Mary Ann after her friend caught him with another woman, and is desperate to be reconciled with her.

== Background ==
After seeing a promotional video, the band had made for agents in a bid to get more work around the country, songwriter Peter Morris approached Black Lace with a view to recording his song "Mary Ann". He wanted the group to sound like chart-topping band Smokie.

It was decided that Alan Barton would take the lead vocal. This was a controversial decision at that time: Barton had not sung lead before and Steve Scholey, the band's lead singer, felt that his position within the band was being jeopardized.

The band travelled to London to record a rough demo of the song at ATV's studio, which was then sent to EMI Records. EMI had booked Berwick Street Studios in Soho for a twelve-hour day with engineer Gwyn Mathias, to record songs by six artists. Each artist was allotted 2 hours to record and mix their record. Black Lace was one of the six acts. Amongst the others were The Swinging Blue Jeans. The record company liked the result, and within a few weeks the band returned to London and signed a recording contract. That second recording session was released by EMI as the single. it took just two hours to record their first official single "Mary Ann". A day was booked at Berwick Street a couple of weeks later to record the B-side ("Drivin") written by Alan Barton and Colin Routh.

Smokie's publishers, RAK Music, claimed that "Mary Ann" was a rip-off of their song "Oh Carol" and threatened to take legal action. The song's publishing company, ATV Music, insisted that any similarity was coincidental, and since they showed that the notation of the two songs were different the case was dropped.

== At Eurovision ==
The song was performed 17th on the night, following Norway's Anita Skorgan with "Oliver" and preceding Austria's Christina Simon with "Heute in Jerusalem". Despite taking the lead after Denmark had awarded the song 10 points, at the close of voting, it had received 73 points, placing it seventh in a field of 19. Norway also awarded the song 10 points, the highest marks received.

It was succeeded as British representative at the 1980 contest by Prima Donna with "Love Enough for Two".

== Charts ==
The single reached No.42 in the UK charts, the lowest placing for a Eurovision entrant in several years, although Black Lace would later go on to greater chart success in the United Kingdom in the 1980s with singles such as "Agadoo".

Chart (1979)	Peak position
UK Singles Official Charts Company	42

Preceded by "Bad Old Days" by Co-Co	United Kingdom in the Eurovision Song Contest; 1979	Succeeded by "Love Enough for Two" by Prima Donna
