= Rock Bottom (Lynsey de Paul and Mike Moran song) =

1977 song by Lynsey de Paul and Mike Moran

Single by Lynsey de Paul and Mike Moran
- Released: 18 March 1977
- Label: Polydor
- Songwriters: Lynsey de Paul; Mike Moran

Eurovision Song Contest 1977 entry
- Country: United Kingdom
- Artists: Lynsey de Paul and Mike Moran
- Language: English
- Composers: Lynsey de Paul; Mike Moran
- Lyricists: Lynsey de Paul; Mike Moran
- Conductor: Ronnie Hazlehurst

Finals performance
- Final result: 2nd
- Final points: 121

Entry chronology
- ◄ "Save Your Kisses for Me" (1976)
- "Bad Old Days" (1978) ►

"Rock Bottom" is a song written and performed by Lynsey de Paul and Mike Moran. It represented the United Kingdom in the Eurovision Song Contest 1977. It was also produced by de Paul and Moran and released on the Polydor record label. Originally it was written for the group Blue Mink; and submitted unbeknown to de Paul and Moran as an entry for A Song For Europe by the publishers; when it was selected, de Paul agreed to perform the song if Moran would join her. On 9 March 1977, "Rock Bottom" was selected to represent the UK at the A Song for Europe 1977 event held at the New London Theatre, presented by Terry Wogan.

== History ==
The song says that when people are in a bad situation they should work to solve problems and not be pessimistic about tragedies.

Eurovision 1977 was almost cancelled due to budget restrictions and it was delayed by five weeks due to a strike by cameramen and technicians. "Where Were You When I Needed Your Love?" by The Foundations was a favorite to be selected. However the strike happened just before the song was to be broadcast and it ensured "Rock Bottom" to be the favorite in the running. The BBC, who had to host the contest that year, did not give the song its whole-hearted support because it was the favourite to win the contest and, if it had won, then they would have to finance and host the 1978 contest, inspiring the plot used in the movie Eurovision Song Contest: The Story of Fire Saga. Eurovision: Secrets & Scandals, a one hour long Channel 5 documentary, shown on 13 May 2022, also confirmed that the BBC was secretly relieved that "Rock Bottom" did not win because they definitely did not want to host the 1978 contest.

The song contest was planned to take place on 2 April due to the cameramen and technicians being on strike, but it was rescheduled and finally took place on 7 May. The song was performed ninth on the night, following Portugal's Os Amigos with "Portugal no coração" and preceding Greece's Pascalis, Marianna, Robert & Bessy with "Mathima solfege". At the close of voting, it had received 121 points, placing second in a field of 18 entries. Lionel Blair choreographed de Paul and Moran's piano seated performance, as he had done for the programme deciding the UK's entry that year. In an interview with Gala magazine, Marie Myriam, the contest winner stated that she loved "Rock Bottom".

It was preceded by "Save Your Kisses for Me" by Brotherhood of Man as the British representative at the 1976 Eurovision Song Contest and succeeded by Co-Co with "Bad Old Days" in 1978. De Paul was the last established and well-known international artist to enter the contest for the UK, until Scott Fitzgerald in 1988.

"Rock Bottom" charted in several European countries, topping the charts in Switzerland, number 2 in Austria, number 4 in Germany, number 4 in Portugal, number 6 in Sweden (number 4 on the Poporama chart), number 7 in Ireland and Norway, number 8 in Belgium, number 21 in Finland and number 10 in France and Israel. In the UK Singles Chart, it reached number. 19 but on the UK Juke Box Top 20 it reached number 8. It also made number 7 on the Europarade chart, number 13 on the Radio Luxembourg Top 30. On the basis of sales from the record-buying public of Europe, it was the winning entry, outperforming the contest's winner, a quarter of a million copies being sold in Germany alone, where it was the 38th best selling single of 1977. It was the 61st best selling single in the French 1977 year end chart. The single was also released on the Polydor label in Japan in July 1977.

In a ranking by The Daily Telegraph of all of the UK's Eurovision Song Contest entries over the last 59 years, "Rock Bottom" came in at number 9 and a year later they wrote "Not just a fun, honky-tonk tune, but also a rather memorable performance. Moran and de Paul were dressed in fetching Edwardian morning-suits, sat back-to-back playing a pair of duelling grand pianos." In an analysis of all Eurovision Song Contest songs that entered the German singles chart, it was ranked number 20, based on number of weeks on the chart and chart positions achieved.

== Cover versions ==
The duo also recorded a German version of "Rock Bottom" called "Für Immer" with German lyrics by Marianne Rebesky, which also had healthy sales figures in German speaking countries, and this version was covered by the band Wir. De Paul and Moran's version of "Für Immer" appeared on the 1977 compilation album, Feuerwerk Der Stars, as well as on a number of other compilation albums. It was also released on De Paul's CD album Greatest Hits - Lynsey de Paul. After the Eurovision Song Contest, it was released as one of the tracks on an EP in Portugal entitled "Conjunto Pentagrama" ("Pentogram Set"), together with the French entry "L'Oiseau Et L'Enfant", the Irish entry "It's Nice To Be In Love Again" and the Monaco entry "Une petite française". Instrumental versions of the song also appeared on James Last's album Auf Last Geht's Los. Other versions have been recorded by the Studio Group, Armi & Danny (in Finnish as Päin Seinää), Jörgen Petersenin Orkesteri, Ted Weber, Brothers Of The World, Leni, Günter Noris, Inger Lise & Stein (in Norwegian as Norsktoppen), Daniel Janin, Annette Klingenberg & Johnny Reimar, Bingos, and The Hiltonaires and, most recently by the jazz guitarist Denny Wright. It was performed by Lilo Wanders and Jurgen Drews on the German TV program Der schönste Grand Prix - mit den größten Hits aus 40 Jahren - mit Götz Alsmann on 18 April 1998 to celebrate the 40th anniversary of the Eurovision Song Contest.

== Compilation album inclusions ==
The song has featured on Eurovision compilation albums such as This Is... Eurovision, Ultimate Eurovision Party!, Favoriet Van Follet - 18 Unieke Eurovisiesongs (18 unique Eurovision songs) and Stars Of Eurovision, as well as a number of de Paul's compilation CDs. It was also a track on the CD double album Die Ultimative Chart Show - Die erfolgreichsten Piano-Hits aller Zeiten in 2010, which made number one in the German albums chart as well as making the Swiss and Austrian albums charts. In 2018, the song was one of 16 songs chosen as 1970s Eurovision classics on a specially released vinyl album that also featured ABBA, Brotherhood Of Man, Baccara, The New Seekers, Anne-Marie David and Gigliola Cinquetti. It was also included as a track on the 2021 album, Now That's What I Call Eurovision, which reached number one on the UK Official Compilations Chart.

== All Time Eurovision listings ==
In 2021, PRS for Music revealed a top 20 of most played UK Eurovision entries and "Rock Bottom" was number 13. BBC Radio 2 conducted a listener vote in 2023 to discover the UK’s favourite Eurovision entry and "Rock Bottom" was voted number 20 Ultimate UK Eurovision Song. It ranks number 47 in a listing of the top 100 Eurovision Song Contest songs by percentage of the maximum vote.

== Charts ==
=== Weekly charts ===
| Chart (1977) | Peak position |
|---|---|
| Austria (Ö3 Austria Top 40) | 2 |
| Belgium (Ultratop 50 Flanders) | 11 |
| Belgium (Ultratop 50 Wallonia) | 18 |
| Denmark (Tracklisten) | 15 |
| Finland (Suomen virallinen lista) | 21 |
| France (SNEP) | 15 |
| Ireland (IRMA) | 7 |
| Norway (VG-lista) | 7 |
| Portugal (AFP) | 4 |
| Sweden (Sverigetopplistan) | 6 |
| Switzerland (Schweizer Hitparade) | 1 |
| UK Singles (Official Charts) | 19 |
| West Germany (GfK) | 4 |

=== Year-end charts ===
| Chart (1977) | Position |
|---|---|
| Austria (Ö3 Austria Top 40) | 21 |
| Switzerland (Schweizer Hitparade) | 15 |
| France (singles chart) | 61 |
| West Germany (Official German Charts) | 38 |

| Preceded by "Save Your Kisses for Me" by Brotherhood of Man | United Kingdom in the Eurovision Song Contest; 1977 | Succeeded by "Bad Old Days" by Co-Co |
