= Bad Old Days =

1978 song by Co-Co

Single by Co-Co
- Released: 1978
- Songwriters: Stephanie de Sykes; Stuart Slater

Eurovision Song Contest 1978 entry
- Country: United Kingdom
- Artists: Terry Bradford; Josie Andrews; Cheryl Baker; Keith Hasler; Paul Rogers
- As: Co-Co
- Language: English
- Composers: Stephanie de Sykes; Stuart Slater
- Lyricists: Stephanie de Sykes; Stuart Slater
- Conductor: Alyn Ainsworth

Finals performance
- Final result: 11th
- Final points: 61

Entry chronology
- ◄ "Rock Bottom" (1977)
- "Mary Ann" (1979) ►

"Bad Old Days" is a song written by Stephanie de Sykes and Stuart Slater, and performed by the band Co-Co. It represented the United Kingdom in the Eurovision Song Contest 1978.

The song is an uptempo love song, with the narrator recalling the 'bad old days' before they met their current partner.

== At Eurovision ==
On the night of the final, 22 April, the song was performed eighth, following Spain's José Vélez with "Bailemos un vals" and preceding Switzerland's Carole Vinci with "Vivre". At the close of voting, it had received 61 points, placing 11th in a field of 20.

At the time, this was the worst showing yet for the UK in Eurovision, lower than the 9th place in 1966 which until 1978 had held the dubious distinction. "Bad Old Days" held the ignominious title until 1987, when the UK finished 13th. Of all the UK entries submitted from 1975-1993, this was the only UK song that did not receive either a 12 or a 10 point score at least once in the voting sequence. The highest score awarded to "Bad Old Days" was 8 points from Germany.

"Bad Old Days" was succeeded as British representative at the 1979 contest by Black Lace with "Mary Ann".

== Charts ==
The single reached No.13 in the UK during a seven-week chart run. The song entered the UK Singles Chart at no.39 for the week the contest was staged. In the following week, it rose rapidly to no.16. Its eventual peak of 13 occurred three weeks after their failure in the contest. It was to be the group's only hit.

Chart (1978)	Peak position
UK Singles Official Charts Company	13

Preceded by "Rock Bottom" by Lynsey de Paul and Mike Moran	United Kingdom in the Eurovision Song Contest; 1978	Succeeded by "Mary Ann" by Black Lace
