= Sally Ann Triplett =

British singer and actress (born 1962)

Sally Ann Triplett (born 15 April 1962, London, England) is a British singer and actress. She participated in two editions of the Eurovision Song Contest and West End productions.

== Career ==
Triplett first represented the United Kingdom in the Eurovision Song Contest 1980 as the lead female vocals of the six-piece band Prima Donna. Prima Donna finished third with their pop-ballad "Love Enough for Two" but the song was a flop in the charts, and the group disbanded after their second single.

Two years later, she again represented United Kingdom in the Eurovision Song Contest 1982, this time as part of a duo, Bardo. Their song, "One Step Further", was a frantic pop number with a complex dance routine. The vigorous choreography noticeably affected the vocals, and not helped by a backing track but instead a live orchestra, the song finished seventh. Author and historian John Kennedy O'Connor notes in his The Eurovision Song Contest – The Official History that Sally-Ann Triplett is one of only four singers to have sung for the United Kingdom in the competition twice, alongside Ronnie Carroll, Cliff Richard and Cheryl Baker of Bucks Fizz. Triplett is the only act to have won the UK heat for Eurovision at both attempts (Cliff Richard was nominated twice without having to compete for the opportunity). The song, however, proved to be a success in the UK Singles Chart when it reached No. 2, and Bardo went on to release two more singles, although no further success followed.

In between her two Eurovision appearances, she was a regular in the BBC television programme Crackerjack!. Triplett has also made many appearances on television. This include Children in Need 2003, EastEnders, Doctors, Down To Earth, Acorn Antiques: The Musical!, Never Mind The Buzzcocks, Holby City and The Fishing Trip.

In a 2009 interview with the BBC, Triplett stated that she had no wish to participate in the Eurovision Song Contest again but, if asked, she would possibly consider it if offered a strong ballad.

== Recordings ==
Triplett has appeared on numerous cast recordings for shows including: Grease, Anything Goes as well as the recent National Symphony Orchestra studio recording of Lionel Bart's Oliver! In 2008 Triplett recorded a song for the CD Act One – Songs From The Musicals of Alexander S. Bermange, an album of twenty recordings by twenty six West End stars, released in November 2008 on Dress Circle Records.

== Personal life ==
She is married to actor/singer/dancer Gary Milner and has two children, Max Milner (from a previous relationship with Gary Dyson, adopted by Milner) and Grace.

== Theatre credits ==
- The Best Little Whorehouse in Texas at the Theatre Royal, Drury Lane
- Follies (as Young Margie) at the Shaftesbury Theatre
- Chess (as Florence) at the Prince Edward Theatre
- Grease (as Betty Rizzo) at the Dominion Theatre
- Jolson The Musical (as Ruby Keeler) opposite Brian Conley at the Victoria Palace Theatre
- Cats (as Grizabella) at the New London Theatre
- The Villain's Opera at the Royal National Theatre
- Anything Goes (as Reno Sweeney) at the Royal National Theatre and the Theatre Royal, Drury Lane
- Guys and Dolls (as Miss Adelaide) at the Piccadilly Theatre
- Carrie - The Musical (as Sue Snell) on Broadway
- Acorn Antiques:The Musical! (as Miss Berta) at the Theatre Royal, Haymarket
- Much Ado About Nothing (as Beatrice) at the Liverpool Playhouse Theatre
- Chicago (as Roxie Hart) at the Adelphi Theatre
- Take Flight (as Amelia Earhart) at the Menier Chocolate Factory
- Make Me A Song produced by Thomas Hopkins at the New Players Theatre
- Mamma Mia! (as Donna) at the Prince of Wales Theatre
- Lend Me A Tenor (as Maria) at the Theatre Royal, Plymouth from 24 September 2010 – 6 October 2010.
- Viva Forever (as Lauren) at Piccadilly Theatre .
- Next To Normal (as Diana) at Drama Center Theatre, Singapore .
- My Judy Garland Life (as Judy/Liza) at Nottingham Playhouse .
- The Last Ship (as Peggy White) at The Bank of America Theatre, Chicago & Neil Simon Theatre, New York .
- A Damsel in Distress (as Billie Dore) at Chichester Festival Theatre .
- Finding Neverland (as Mrs. Emma du Maurier) at Lunt-Fontanne Theatre, Broadway .
- Sweeney Todd (as Mrs. Lovett) at Barrow Street Theatre, New York .
- Oklahoma! (as Aunt Eller) at Wyndham's Theatre .
- The Witches (as Gran) at Royal National Theatre
- Cabaret (as Fräulein Schneider) at Playhouse Theatre
- Truly Scrumptious in a Chitty Chitty Bang Bang at the London Palladium.
