= Michael Moran (music producer) =

English musician, songwriter and record producer (born 1948)

Mike Moran
- Born: Michael Moran; 4 March 1948 (age 78); Leeds, West Riding of Yorkshire, England
- Genres: Pop; rock; classical
- Occupations: Musician; songwriter; composer; record producer
- Instrument: Keyboard
- Years active: 1960s–present
- Labels: Music for Pleasure; Power Exchange Records & Tapes; Polydor; Mercury; Bruton Music; Themes International Music

Michael Moran (born 4 March 1948) is an English musician, songwriter, composer and record producer.

== Early life and education ==
Moran was born 4 March 1948 in Leeds, West Riding of Yorkshire, England.

Moran studied at the Royal College of Music in London prior to becoming a session musician and a composer and arranger.

== Career ==
Moran's work includes writing the scores for such HandMade Films productions as Time Bandits (1981), The Missionary (1982) and Water (1985). His other film scores included Bloodbath at the House of Death (1984), The Turnaround (1995), A Fox's Tale (2008), Blessed (2008) and A Thousand Kisses Deep (2011), as well as arranging the score to Death Wish 3 (1985), and his TV work includes providing music for Strangers (1978), Harry's Game (1982), Taggart (1985), The Bombmaker (2001), and Sherlock: Case of Evil (2002). He also played with the Ian Gillan Band (1975-1976).

"Rock Bottom", which he wrote in partnership with Lynsey de Paul, was the UK entry in the Eurovision Song Contest 1977, and put him in the spotlight for the first time. Although leading early on in the voting, the song eventually came second in the contest. Nevertheless, it went on to become a Top 20 hit in many European countries including France, Germany, Austria and Switzerland, where it reached the top of their singles chart. It was more successful in Continental Europe than in the United Kingdom and was also covered by many local artists in a number of different languages.

De Paul and Moran continued their successful songwriting partnership, notably writing "Let Your Body Go Downtown", a UK Top 40 hit for the Martyn Ford Orchestra, and the follow-up single "Going to a Disco", as well as the songs "Without You" and "Now and Then", which appeared on the de Paul albums Tigers and Fireflies (1979) and Just a Little Time (1994) respectively.

For many years. Moran was the musical director for the UK ITV children's music series Get It Together, performing each week, accompanying the various studio guests and playing the theme music. He had another attempt at writing a UK Eurovision entry in 1990, when he wrote "That Old Feeling Again" for Stephen Lee Garden, which placed fifth out of the eight songs in the UK song selection competition.

Other songs co-written by Moran are "Snot Rap" (recorded by Kenny Everett), as well as "No Mean City" (the theme to the crime drama Taggart, sung by Maggie Bell), "It's Alright" (the theme to the crime drama New Tricks, sung by Dennis Waterman) and the music for the UK game series Chain Letters, Lucky Ladders, The Krypton Factor.

Moran has worked with Ozzy Osbourne, Nicko McBrain, George Harrison, and various members of Queen. He was co-producer, arranger, keyboard player, and co-author of all the tracks on the album Barcelona, the classical crossover collaboration of Queen frontman Freddie Mercury and opera singer Montserrat Caballé, released in 1988. He produced The Queen Album (1988), Piaf (1994) and Essential Musicals (2006) for Elaine Paige.

More recently, Moran appeared in Dragons' Den (series 7, episode 3) as the musical director of a Dusty Springfield musical, and also produced the Tommy Fleming album The West's Awake (2014).

Moran was awarded a Gold Badge from the British Academy of Songwriters, Composers and Authors in 2007 for his service to British music, and a Television and Radio Industries Club (TRIC) award for his theme music on Taggart.

Awards and achievements
Preceded by Brotherhood of Man with "Save Your Kisses for Me"	UK in the Eurovision Song Contest; 1977 (with Lynsey de Paul)	Succeeded by Co-Co with "The Bad Old Days"
