= Bardo (band) =

British band

- Origin: United Kingdom
- Genres: Pop, dance
- Instruments: Vocals
- Years active: 1982–1983
- Label: Epic Records
- Past members: Sally Ann Triplett; Stephen Fischer

Bardo was a male/female pop music duo (Sally Ann Triplett and Stephen Fischer) formed to represent the United Kingdom in the Eurovision Song Contest 1982 with the song "One Step Further".

== Overview ==
Triplett, a children's TV presenter (Crackerjack), was previously a member of the UK's 1980 Eurovision act Prima Donna. Triplett is one of only five acts to have represented the UK in the Eurovision Song Contest twice; the others being Ronnie Carroll, Cliff Richard, Cheryl Baker and James Newman.

On the day of the Eurovision Song Contest 1982, Bardo were rated favourites to win by Ladbrokes bookmakers and were also rated highly by Terry Wogan. On the night, Bardo's performance was criticised for nerves and for placing more emphasis on the dance routines than the singing. "One Step Further" (written by Simon Jefferis) came seventh in the competition, below expectations. The single however performed much better in the UK Singles Chart by reaching No. 2.

Bardo were managed by Nichola Martin, the woman responsible for 1981 Eurovision victors Bucks Fizz, and produced by the same producer, Andy Hill. Signed to Epic Records, plans were in place to continue Bardo's career, but subsequent singles "Talking Out of Line" (written by Andy Hill and Nichola Martin) and "Hang On to Your Heart" (written by Ian Maidman) failed to chart. An album was planned but shelved because of the low sales of the singles.

Triplett and Fischer had by this time become romantically linked and stayed together after the dissolution of Bardo. They also continued to perform together under a different name and spent some time in France. In 1990, Triplett gave birth to their son. They split up some years later. Triplett has since become a successful theatre actress and performer, most notably in the musicals Anything Goes (alongside John Barrowman) and Guys and Dolls. Fischer also continued to perform in the music business, mainly on stage and performed as a pianist and vocalist with the Penguin Cafe Orchestra.

Triplett and Fischer reunited to perform "One Step Further" on stage in London in 2010, wearing their original costumes, to raise money for charity as part of the West End Eurovision night. In 2013 a download album was released on iTunes called The Best of Bardo. This featured the duo's six A and B-sides as well as a number of newly created remixes.

== Discography ==
=== Singles ===
- March 1982 – "One Step Further" (Epic) UK No. 2
- June 1982 – "Talking Out of Line" (Epic)
- January 1983 – "Hang On to Your Heart" (Epic)

Awards and achievements
Preceded by Bucks Fizz with "Making Your Mind Up"	United Kingdom in the Eurovision Song Contest; 1982	Succeeded by Sweet Dreams with "I'm Never Giving Up"
