= Never Give Up on You =

2017 single by Lucie Jones

Single by Lucie Jones
- Released: 27 January 2017; 11 March 2017 (Eurovision version)
- Recorded: 2016
- Genre: Chamber pop
- Length: 2:59
- Label: ArtPeople, LJM
- Songwriters: Emmelie de Forest; Daniel Salcedo; Lawrie Martin

Lucie Jones singles chronology
"The Ballad of Midsomer County" (2015)	"Never Give Up on You" (2017)

Music video
- "Never Give Up on You" on YouTube

Eurovision Song Contest 2017 entry
- Country: United Kingdom
- Artist: Lucie Jones
- Language: English
- Composers: Emmelie de Forest; Daniel Salcedo; Lawrie Martin
- Lyricists: Emmelie de Forest; Daniel Salcedo; Lawrie Martin

Finals performance
- Final result: 15th
- Final points: 111

Entry chronology
- ◄ "You're Not Alone" (2016)
- "Storm" (2018) ►

Official performance video
- "Never Give Up on You" (final) on YouTube

"Never Give Up on You" is a song released by Welsh singer Lucie Jones, on 27 January 2017. The song represented the United Kingdom in the Eurovision Song Contest 2017. It was written by Daniel Salcedo, Lawrie Martin, and Emmelie de Forest, the latter of whom won the Eurovision Song Contest 2013 with the song "Only Teardrops". A new version of the song, and music video was released on 11 March 2017. The single peaked at number seventy three on the UK Singles Chart. It finished 15th place with 111 points, giving the United Kingdom their best result in the contest since 2011.

== Track listing ==
Digital download
No.	Title	Length
1.	"Never Give Up on You"	3:00

Instrumental
No.	Title	Length
1.	"Never Give Up on You" (Instrumental)	3:00

7th Heaven Club Mix [Radio Edit]
No.	Title	Length
1.	"Never Give Up on You" (7th Heaven Club Mix [Radio Edit])	4:09

7th Heaven Club Mix
No.	Title	Length
1.	"Never Give Up on You" (7th Heaven Club Mix)	7:15

Digital EP
No.	Title	Length
1.	"Never Give Up on You"	3:00
2.	"Never Give Up on You" (7th Heaven Club Mix [Radio Edit])	4:09
3.	"Never Give Up on You" (7th Heaven Club Mix)	7:15
4.	"Never Give Up on You" (Instrumental)	3:00

== Charts ==
Chart (2017)	Peak position
Scotland Singles (OCC)	29
UK Singles (OCC)	73

== Release history ==
Region	Date	Format	Label
United Kingdom	27 January 2017	Digital download	ArtPeople

== Lasse Meling version ==
"Never Give Up on You"

Single by Lasse Meling
- Released: 14 April 2017
- Genre: Pop
- Length: 2:42
- Label: AEM, Sony Music
- Songwriters: Emmelie de Forest; Daniel Salcedo; Lawrie Martin
- Producers: Daniel Salcedo; Rune Braager

Lasse Meling singles chronology
"Cannonball" (2016)	"Never Give Up on You" (2017)

Danish singer Lasse Meling released a version of the song on 14 April 2017 through AEM Records and Sony Music. The song was produced by Daniel Salcedo and Rune Braager.

=== Track listing ===
- Digital download
1. "Never Give Up on You" – 2:42
