= Love Enough for Two =

1980 song by Prima Donna

Single by Prima Donna
- Released: 1980
- Songwriters: Stephanie de Sykes; Stuart Slater

Eurovision Song Contest 1980 entry
- Country: United Kingdom
- Artists: Kate Robbins; Lance Aston; Sally Ann Triplett; Jane Robbins; Danny Finn; Alan Coates
- As: Prima Donna
- Language: English
- Composers: Stephanie de Sykes; Stuart Slater
- Lyricists: Stuart Slater; Stephanie de Sykes
- Conductor: John Coleman

Finals performance
- Final result: 3rd
- Final points: 106

Entry chronology
- ◄ "Mary Ann" (1979)
- "Making Your Mind Up" (1981) ►

"Love Enough for Two" is a song written by Stephanie de Sykes and Stuart Slater, and performed by the band Prima Donna. It represented the United Kingdom in the Eurovision Song Contest 1980. The song is uptempo and about the love between two people. It was the second of two UK Eurovision entries written by Stephanie de Sykes and Stuart Slater.

== At Eurovision ==
The song was performed 13th on the night, following Germany's Katja Ebstein with "Theater" and preceding Portugal's José Cid with "Um grande, grande amor". At the close of voting, it had received 106 points, placing 3rd in a field of 19.

It was succeeded as British representative at the 1981 contest by Bucks Fizz with "Making Your Mind Up".

== Charts ==
Chart (1980)	Peak position
UK Singles Official Charts Company	48

Preceded by "Mary Ann" by Black Lace	United Kingdom in the Eurovision Song Contest; 1980	Succeeded by "Making Your Mind Up" by Bucks Fizz
