= Alex Larke =

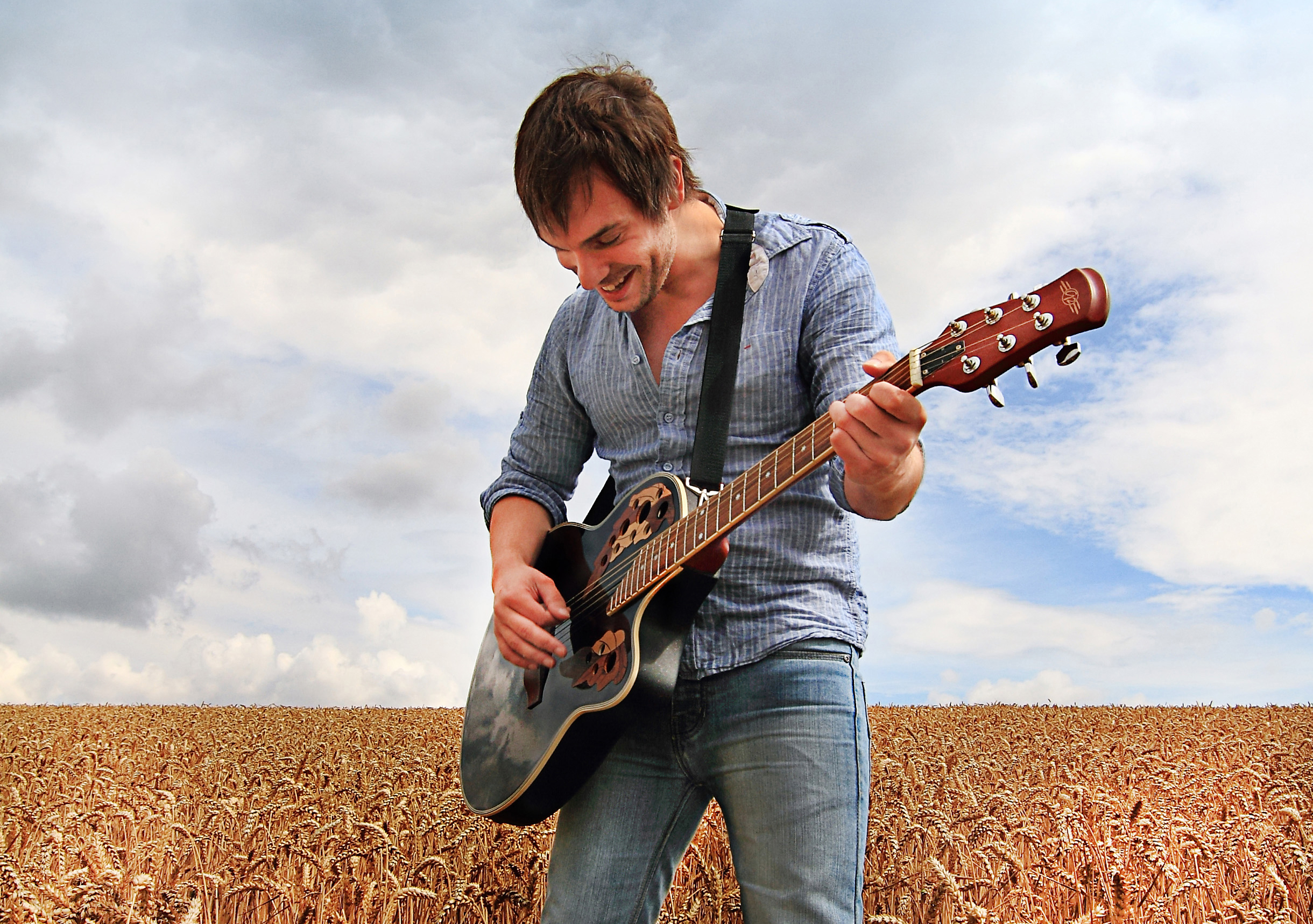
- Alex Larke

Background information
- Born: Alexis Kenneth Larke; 25 May 1979 (age 47); Welwyn Garden City, England
- Genres: Alternative rock, pop, indie rock, electronic
- Occupations: Musician, singer-songwriter
- Instruments: Vocals, guitar, keyboards, harmonica, bass guitar, ukulele
- Years active: 1999–present
- Website: alexlarke.com

Alexis Kenneth Larke (born 25 May 1979), also known as Larkey Larke or Larkey, is a British singer/songwriter who represented the United Kingdom as part of the duo Electro Velvet, in the Eurovision Song Contest 2015 with the song "Still in Love with You". For most of his career, Larke has been a solo artist, although he also worked with British rock bands, X and Manimal, before later collaborating with electronic act Teflon Child and big beat pioneer, Cut La Roc.

In 2017, Larke released his debut solo album, entitled Disposable Love. The album was preceded by two singles, "Shine On" and "Belladonna".

== Career ==
=== Early beginnings ===
Born in Welwyn Garden City, Larke was raised, with his sister Anna, by father Jerry, a motorcycle racer, and his Athens, Greece-born mother Penelope, a seamstress. Living in a council house, Larke had a very modest, but happy working-class upbringing in a home that forever had music playing on the stereo. Bands such as the Kinks, the Rolling Stones, the Who, the Police and Elvis Presley would provide him with the basis of his musical influences that would endure through his career.

Larke has performed for the Rolling Stones tribute group The Rollin' Clones, touring the UK and internationally with the band since 2007.

He has recently worked with big beat pioneer Cut La Roc on his album Larger Than Life, which also features Ice-T collaborator Donald D and Snow Patrol frontman Gary Lightbody.

=== 2015: Eurovision Song Contest ===
Electro Velvet were selected by the BBC to represent the United Kingdom in the Eurovision Song Contest 2015 with their song "Still in Love with You". The entry was presented on 7 March 2015 via the BBC Red Button service. The song received a mixed to negative reception upon its announcement, but reviews were more favourable as time went on. In the Eurovision final they received 5 points and were placed 24th out of 27.

The staging of the song included two pairs of additional dancers, two of whom performed breakdance and acrobatic moves. The television production involved some Busby Berkeley-style shots from above and darkened sequences during which the performer's costumes were illuminated with integral neon strips. There were a couple of pyro effects during the song, including at the very end.

=== New single ===
On 26 October 2016, Alex Larke posted a tweet showing a picture of a video editing suite, with a picture of his face on the right hand screen. The less than cryptic message stated, "Making a music video.... #Shhh #TopSecret", alluding to the fact that Larke is releasing a single in the future.

== Discography ==
=== Extended plays ===
| Album title | Album details |
|---|---|
| Disposable Love | Release date: May 2017; Label: 12 Gods Recordings; Formats: Limited release digital download, compact disc |

=== Singles ===
| Year | Single | Peak chart position | | | Album |
| Year | Single | UK Indie | UK Indie Breakers | AUT | Album |
|---|---|---|---|---|---|
| 2015 | "Still in Love with You" | 8 | 2 | 53 | Non-album single |

| Preceded by Molly Smitten-Downes with "Children of the Universe" | United Kingdom in the Eurovision Song Contest; 2015 | Succeeded by Joe and Jake with "You're Not Alone" |
