= United Kingdom in the Eurovision Song Contest 2015 =

- Eurovision Song Contest 2015
- Participating broadcaster: British Broadcasting Corporation (BBC)
- Country: United Kingdom
- Selection process: Internal selection
- Announcement date: 7 March 2015

Competing entry
- Song: "Still in Love with You"
- Artist: Electro Velvet
- Songwriters: David Mindel; Adrian Bax White

Placement
- Final result: 24th, 5 points

Participation chronology

The United Kingdom was represented at the Eurovision Song Contest 2015 with the song "Still in Love with You", written by David Mindel and Adrian Bax White, and performed by the duo Electro Velvet. The British participating broadcaster, the British Broadcasting Corporation (BBC), internally selected both the song and the performer. Electro Velvet and "Still in Love with You" was announced as the British entry in a special presentation show titled Our Song for Eurovision 2015 broadcast on the BBC Red Button service in March 2015.

As a member of the "Big Five", the United Kingdom automatically qualified to compete in the final of the Eurovision Song Contest. Performing in position 5, the United Kingdom placed 24th out of the 27 participating countries with 5 points.

== Background ==
Prior to the 2015 contest, the British Broadcasting Corporation (BBC) had participated in the Eurovision Song Contest representing the United Kingdom fifty-seven times. Thus far, it has won the contest five times: in 1967 with the song "Puppet on a String" performed by Sandie Shaw, in 1969 with the song "Boom Bang-a-Bang" performed by Lulu, in 1976 with the song "Save Your Kisses for Me" performed by Brotherhood of Man, in 1981 with the song "Making Your Mind Up" performed by Bucks Fizz, and in 1997 with the song "Love Shine a Light" performed by Katrina and the Waves. To this point, the nation is noted for having finished as the runner-up in a record fifteen contests. Up to and including 1998, the UK had only twice finished outside the top 10, in 1978 and 1987. Since 1999, the year in which the rule was abandoned that songs must be performed in one of the official languages of the country participating, the UK has had less success, thus far only finishing within the top ten twice: in 2002 with the song "Come Back" performed by Jessica Garlick and in 2009 with the song "It's My Time" performed by Jade Ewen. For the 2014 contest, the United Kingdom finished in seventeenth place out of twenty-six competing entries with the song "Children of the Universe" performed by Molly.

As part of its duties as participating broadcaster, the BBC organises the selection of its entry in the Eurovision Song Contest and broadcasts the event in the country. The broadcaster announced that it would participate in the 2015 contest on 9 September 2014. Between 2011 and 2013, BBC opted to internally select the British entry, a selection procedure that continued for their 2014 entry.

== Before Eurovision ==
=== Internal selection ===
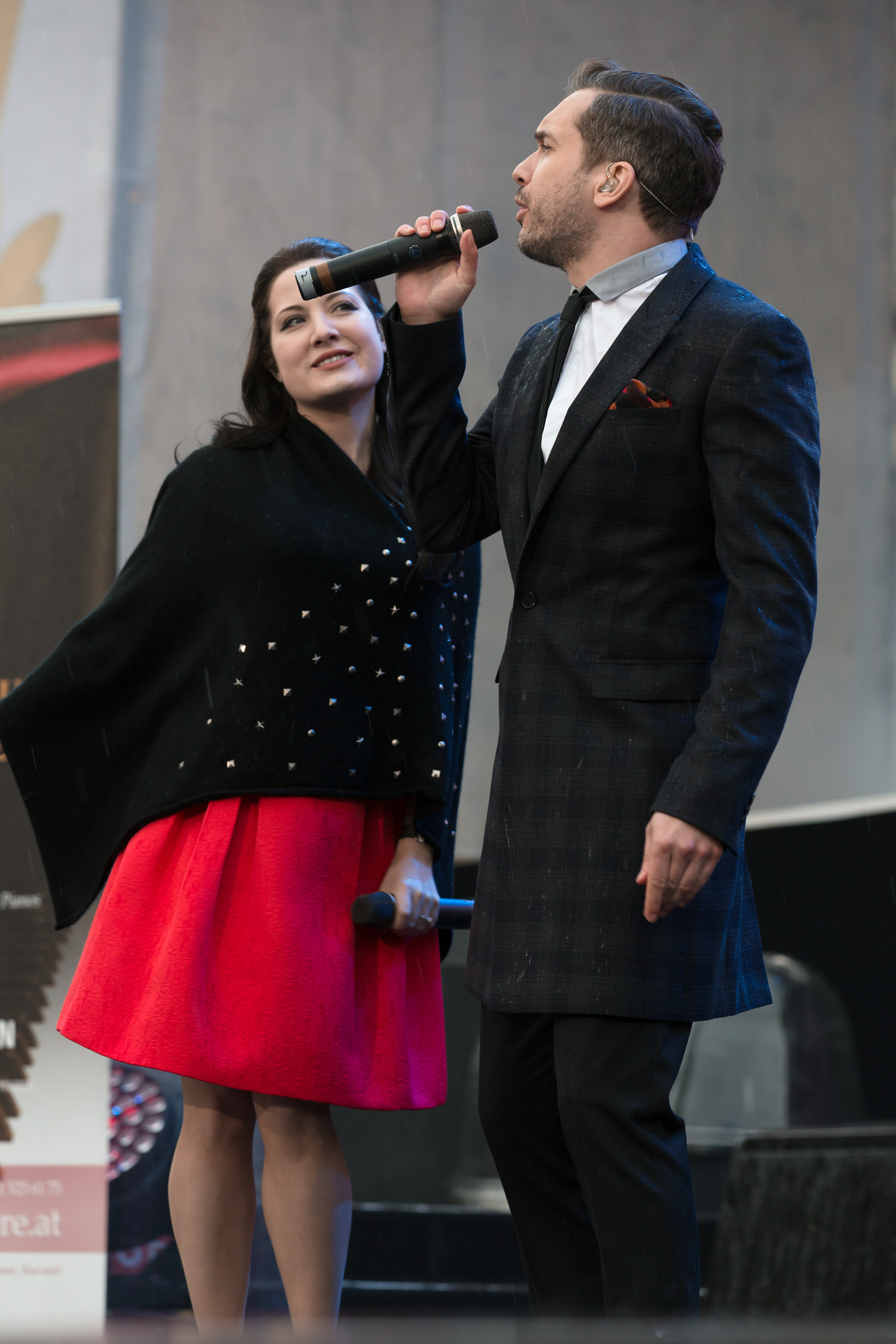
Electro Velvet were internally selected to represent the United Kingdom in the Eurovision Song Contest 2015

On 6 October 2014, BBC announced that the British entry for the Eurovision Song Contest 2015 would be selected internally. An open submission was announced for interested artists to submit their songs in the form of a video recording until 7 November 2014. In addition to the open call, the BBC also considered entries provided by record labels and music industry experts including writers, producers and artists from the BBC Introducing platform. The 300 received submissions were reviewed by a professional panel headed by British Eurovision executive producer and Head of Delegation Guy Freeman, and a twelve-song shortlist was compiled and presented to an alternate twelve-member panel that ultimately selected the British entry. On 24 February 2015, Guy Freeman revealed that the British artist and song would be revealed on 7 March 2015 on the BBC Red Button service.

On 7 March 2015, the song "Still in Love with You" written by David Mindel and Adrian Bax White and performed by the duo Electro Velvet was revealed as the British entry during the show Our Song for Eurovision 2015, hosted by Scott Mills on the BBC Red Button service. The song was also presented to the public on the same day through the release of the official music video via the official Eurovision Song Contest's YouTube channel. Electro Velvet consists of singers Alex Larke and Bianca Nicholas, and was formed specifically for the Eurovision Song Contest.

=== Promotion ===
Electro Velvet made several appearances across Europe to specifically promote "Still in Love with You" as the British Eurovision entry. On 10 April, Electro Velvet performed during the Eurovision PreParty Riga, which was organised by OGAE Latvia and held at the Palladium in Riga, Latvia. On 18 April, Electro Velvet performed during the Eurovision in Concert event which was held at the Melkweg venue in Amsterdam, Netherlands and hosted by Cornald Maas and Edsilia Rombley. On 24 April, Electro Velvet performed during the Eurovision Pre-Party, which was held at the Place de Paris Korston Concert Hall in Moscow, Russia.

In addition to their international appearances, On 26 April, Electro Velvet performed during the London Eurovision Party, which was held at the Café de Paris venue in London, United Kingdom and hosted by Nicki French and Paddy O'Connell. On 8 May, Electro Velvet were part of the guest line-up for the BBC One programme The Graham Norton Show where they performed "Still in Love with You" live and were interviewed by host Graham Norton.

== At Eurovision ==
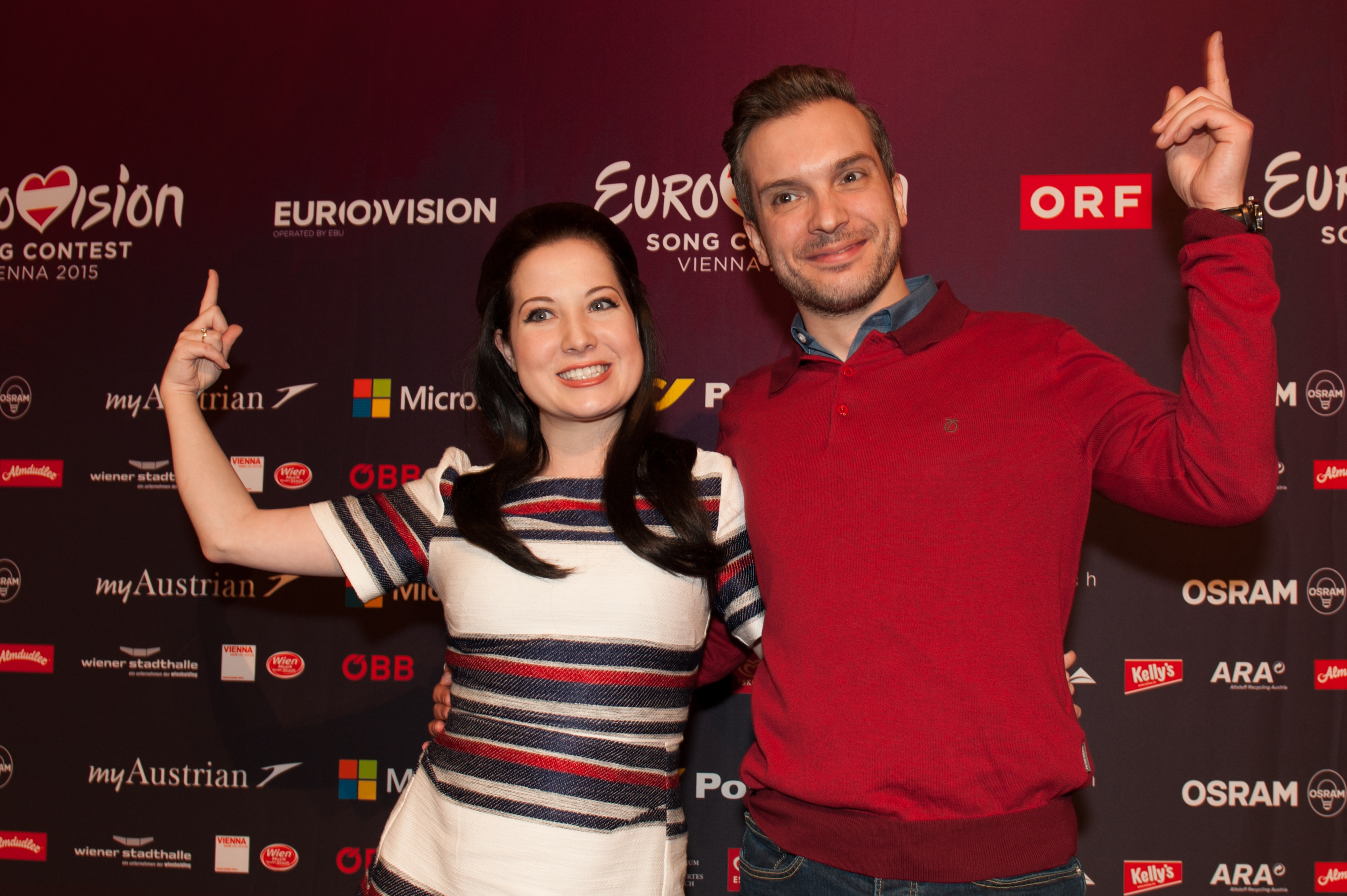
Electro Velvet during a press meet and greet

According to Eurovision rules, all nations with the exceptions of the host country and the "Big Five" (France, Germany, Italy, Spain and the United Kingdom) are required to qualify from one of two semi-finals in order to compete for the final; the top ten countries from each semi-final progress to the final. In the 2015 contest, Australia also competed directly in the final as an invited guest nation. As a member of the "Big Five", the United Kingdom automatically qualified to compete in the final on 23 May 2015. In addition to their participation in the final, the United Kingdom was also required to broadcast and vote in one of the two semi-finals. During the semi-final allocation draw on 26 January 2015, the United Kingdom was assigned to broadcast and vote in the second semi-final on 21 May 2015.

In the United Kingdom, the semi-finals were broadcast on BBC Four with commentary by Scott Mills and Mel Giedroyc. The second semi-final was simulcast on BBC Radio 2 Eurovision, a pop-up DAB station, with commentary from Ana Matronic. The final was televised on BBC One with commentary by Graham Norton and broadcast on BBC Radio 2 and Radio 2 Eurovision with commentary by Ken Bruce. The British spokesperson, who announced the British votes during the final, was Nigella Lawson.

=== Final ===
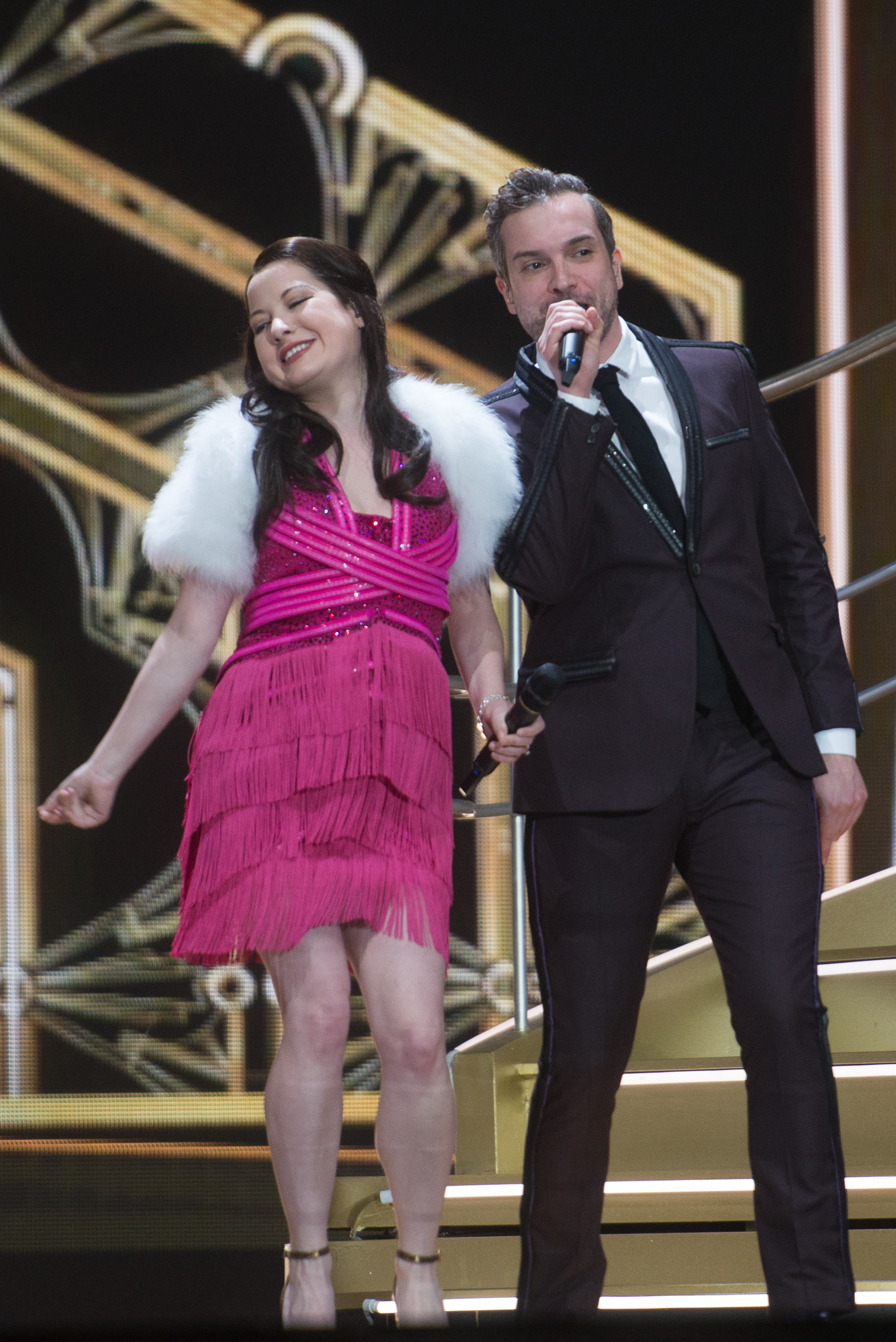
Electro Velvet during a rehearsal before the final

Electro Velvet took part in technical rehearsals on 17 and 20 May, followed by dress rehearsals on 22 and 23 May. This included the jury final where the professional juries of each country watched and voted on the competing entries. After technical rehearsals were held on 20 May, the "Big Five" countries, host country Austria and special guest Australia held a press conference. As part of this press conference, the artists took part in a draw to determine which half of the grand final they would subsequently participate in. The United Kingdom was drawn to compete in the first half. Following the conclusion of the second semi-final, the shows' producers decided upon the running order of the final. The running order for the semi-finals and final was decided by the shows' producers rather than through another draw, so that similar songs were not placed next to each other. The United Kingdom was subsequently placed to perform in position 5, following the entry from Estonia and before the entry from Armenia.

The British performance on stage featured the members of Electro Velvet performing on stage with the LED screens displaying Art Deco designs and flashing lights that transitioned to neon colours. The performance began with each member of the duo making their entrance from a staircase prop and were then joined by two male and two female backing vocalists. Bianca Nicholas was dressed in a cerise pink 1920s style dress while Alex Larke was dressed in an aubergine coloured suit. The female backing vocalists were dressed in purple while the male backing vocalists were dressed in black and white. Each of the performers' outfits and the staircases were also equipped with lights that would turn on when the stage transitioned to darker neon colours. The backing vocalists that joined Electro Velvet for the performance were Scarlette Douglas, Sophie Carmen Jones, Chris Arias and Ryan Heseltine. The United Kingdom placed twenty-fourth in the final, scoring 5 points.

=== Voting ===
Voting during the three shows consisted of 50 percent public televoting and 50 percent from a jury deliberation. The jury consisted of five music industry professionals who were citizens of the country they represent, with their names published before the contest to ensure transparency. This jury was asked to judge each contestant based on: vocal capacity; the stage performance; the song's composition and originality; and the overall impression by the act. In addition, no member of a national jury could be related in any way to any of the competing acts in such a way that they cannot vote impartially and independently. The individual rankings of each jury member were released shortly after the grand final.

Following the release of the full split voting by the EBU after the conclusion of the competition, it was revealed that the United Kingdom had placed twenty-fourth with the public televote and twenty-third with the jury vote. In the public vote, the United Kingdom scored 7 points and in the jury vote the nation scored 12 points.

Below is a breakdown of points awarded to the United Kingdom and awarded by the United Kingdom in the second semi-final and grand final of the contest, and the breakdown of the jury voting and televoting conducted during the two shows:

==== Points awarded to the United Kingdom ====
Points awarded to the United Kingdom (Final)
Score	Country
12 points	
10 points	
8 points	
7 points	
6 points	
5 points	
4 points	
3 points	San Marino
2 points	
1 point	Ireland; Malta

==== Points awarded by the United Kingdom ====
Points awarded by the United Kingdom (Semi-final 2)
Score	Country
12 points	Israel
10 points	Latvia
8 points	Ireland
7 points	Sweden
6 points	Cyprus
5 points	Malta
4 points	Poland
3 points	Lithuania
2 points	Norway
1 point	Portugal

Points awarded by the United Kingdom (Final)
Score	Country
12 points	Sweden
10 points	Australia
8 points	Italy
7 points	Latvia
6 points	Russia
5 points	Israel
4 points	Lithuania
3 points	Belgium
2 points	Poland
1 point	Serbia

==== Detailed voting results ====
The following members comprised the British jury:

- David Arch (jury chairperson) – musical director, musician, composer, arranger
- Mark De-Lisser – vocal coach
- Thomas Blaize – singer, songwriter, composer
- Yvie Burnett – singer, mezzo-soprano, vocal coach
- Pandora Christie – radio/TV presenter

Detailed voting results from the United Kingdom (Semi-final 2)
R/O	Country	D. Arch	M. De-Lisser	T. Blaize	Y. Burnett	P. Christie	Jury Rank	Televote Rank	Combined Rank	Points
01	Lithuania	12	13	10	16	11	14	1	8	3
02	Ireland	9	3	4	4	1	2	6	3	8
03	San Marino	16	16	15	17	17	17	17	17	
04	Montenegro	13	15	8	13	16	15	14	15	
05	Malta	4	5	9	5	3	3	10	6	5
06	Norway	6	6	14	3	6	7	8	9	2
07	Portugal	3	8	16	9	9	9	9	10	1
08	Czech Republic	15	7	5	6	10	8	13	12	
09	Israel	2	2	6	1	2	1	5	1	12
10	Latvia	7	1	3	15	4	4	3	2	10
11	Azerbaijan	17	11	7	10	14	13	16	16	
12	Iceland	14	14	17	12	13	16	12	14	
13	Sweden	1	4	12	7	7	6	4	4	7
14	Switzerland	8	10	13	14	8	11	15	13	
15	Cyprus	10	12	2	2	5	5	7	5	6
16	Slovenia	5	17	1	8	15	10	11	11	
17	Poland	11	9	11	11	12	12	2	7	4

Detailed voting results from the United Kingdom (Final)
R/O	Country	D. Arch	M. De-Lisser	T. Blaize	Y. Burnett	P. Christie	Jury Rank	Televote Rank	Combined Rank	Points
01	Slovenia	8	20	4	10	11	10	23	17	
02	France	21	13	12	21	20	20	26	25	
03	Israel	4	9	6	1	3	3	10	6	5
04	Estonia	20	18	23	23	6	21	12	15	
05	United Kingdom									
06	Armenia	25	25	24	25	23	25	22	26	
07	Lithuania	14	19	13	13	16	14	1	7	4
08	Serbia	18	15	8	9	15	12	9	10	1
09	Norway	7	12	17	14	10	11	17	13	
10	Sweden	1	1	1	3	7	1	3	1	12
11	Cyprus	6	11	9	8	8	7	14	11	
12	Australia	3	3	5	2	1	2	5	2	10
13	Belgium	11	5	2	18	9	8	8	8	3
14	Austria	10	21	22	17	13	16	21	20	
15	Greece	19	17	20	12	14	15	18	16	
16	Montenegro	16	16	15	20	18	18	25	23	
17	Germany	13	10	16	7	2	9	20	14	
18	Poland	12	14	14	22	21	17	2	9	2
19	Latvia	9	2	3	15	5	5	6	4	7
20	Romania	24	24	21	16	24	24	11	18	
21	Spain	17	8	25	5	12	13	13	12	
22	Hungary	15	23	7	24	26	23	19	22	
23	Georgia	23	6	19	19	19	19	16	19	
24	Azerbaijan	22	22	18	11	22	22	24	24	
25	Russia	5	4	11	4	17	6	7	5	6
26	Albania	26	26	26	26	25	26	15	21	
27	Italy	2	7	10	6	4	4	4	3	8
