= Anja Nissen discography =

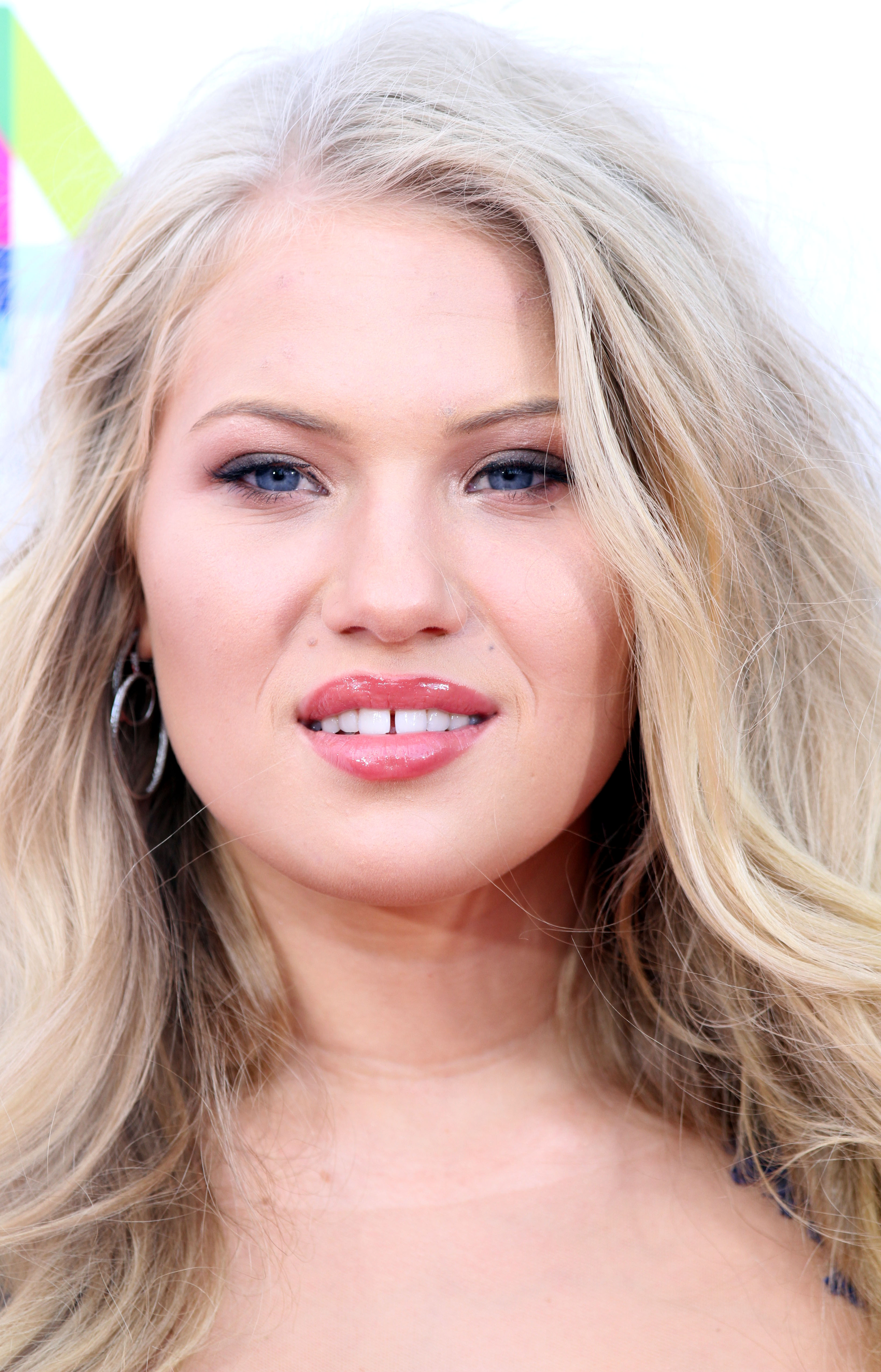
- Nissen at the 2014 ARIA Music Awards
- Studio albums: 1
- EPs: 2
- Singles: 9
- Music videos: 4

Danish-Australian singer and songwriter Anja Nissen has released one studio album, two extended plays, nine singles (including two as featured artist) and four music videos.

== Albums ==
=== Studio albums ===
| Title | Details | Peak chart positions |
| Title | Details | AUS |
|---|---|---|
| Anja Nissen | Released: 1 August 2014; Label: Universal Music Australia; Formats: CD, digital download | 11 |

== Extended plays ==
| Title | Details |
|---|---|
| Where I Am | Released: 5 May 2017; Label: Universal Music Australia; Formats: CD, digital download |
| Same Room | Released: 3 February 2023; Label: Anja Nissen Music; Formats: digital download |

== Singles ==
=== As lead artist ===
| Title | Year | Peak chart positions | Album |
| Title | Year | AUS | Album |
|---|---|---|---|
| "I'm So Excited" (featuring will.i.am and Cody Wise) | 2014 | 42 | Non-album singles |
| "Anyone Who Had a Heart" | 2015 | 30 | Non-album singles |
| "Triumph" | 2015 | — | Non-album singles |
| "Never Alone" | 2016 | — | Non-album singles |
| "Where I Am" | 2017 | — | Where I Am |
| "If We Only Had Tonight" | 2020 | — | Same Room |
| "Can't Do This" | 2020 | — | Same Room |
"—" denotes releases that did not chart or were not released.

=== As featured artist ===
| Title | Year | Album |
|---|---|---|
| "Don't Ask Me" (with Ricky Bloomfield) | 2012 | Non-album single |
| "You're All I Need" (Kevin Flournoy featuring Orion Song, Christine Noel & Anja Nissen) | 2022 | Non-album single |

== Music videos ==
| Title | Year | Director(s) | Reference |
|---|---|---|---|
| "I'm So Excited" (featuring will.i.am and Cody Wise) | 2014 | Ernst Weber and Pasha Shapiro | |
| "Triumph" | 2015 | Marc Furmie | |
| "Where I Am" | 2017 | — | |
| "Talk With Your Body" | 2023 | Frederick Tabiyus Nah IV | |

== Guest appearances ==
| Title | Year | Album |
|---|---|---|
| "A Dream Is a Wish Your Heart Makes" (from Cinderella) | 2014 | We Love Disney |
| "Joy to the World" | 2014 | The Spirit of Christmas 2014 |
