= United Kingdom in the Eurovision Song Contest 2016 =

- Eurovision Song Contest 2016
- Participating broadcaster: British Broadcasting Corporation (BBC)
- Country: United Kingdom
- Selection process: Eurovision: You Decide
- Selection date: 26 February 2016

Competing entry
- Song: "You're Not Alone"
- Artist: Joe and Jake
- Songwriters: Matt Schwartz; Justin J. Benson; S. Kanes

Placement
- Final result: 24th, 62 points

Participation chronology

The United Kingdom was represented at the Eurovision Song Contest 2016 with the song "You're Not Alone", written by Matt Schwartz, Justin J. Benson, and S. Kanes, and performed by Joe and Jake. The British participating broadcaster, the British Broadcasting Corporation (BBC), selected its entry in the contest via the national final Eurovision: You Decide. Six acts competed in the national final and the winner was selected entirely through a public vote.

As a member of the "Big Five", the United Kingdom automatically qualified to compete in the final of the Eurovision Song Contest. Performing in position 25, the United Kingdom placed 24th out of the 26 participating countries with 62 points.

== Background ==
Prior to the 2016 contest, the British Broadcasting Corporation (BBC) had participated in the Eurovision Song Contest representing the United Kingdom fifty-eight times. Thus far, it has won the contest five times: in 1967 with the song "Puppet on a String" performed by Sandie Shaw, in 1969 with the song "Boom Bang-a-Bang" performed by Lulu, in 1976 with the song "Save Your Kisses for Me" performed by Brotherhood of Man, in 1981 with the song "Making Your Mind Up" performed by Bucks Fizz, and in 1997 with the song "Love Shine a Light" performed by Katrina and the Waves. To this point, the nation is noted for having finished as the runner-up in a record fifteen contests. Up to and including 1998, the UK had only twice finished outside the top 10, in 1978 and 1987. Since 1999, the year in which the rule was abandoned that songs must be performed in one of the official languages of the country participating, the UK has had less success, thus far only finishing within the top ten twice: in 2002 with the song "Come Back" performed by Jessica Garlick and in 2009 with the song "It's My Time" performed by Jade Ewen. For the 2015 contest, the United Kingdom finished in twenty-fourth place out of twenty-seven competing entries with the song "Still in Love with You" performed by Electro Velvet.

As part of its duties as participating broadcaster, the BBC organises the selection of its entry in the Eurovision Song Contest and broadcasts the event in the country. The broadcaster announced that it would participate in the 2016 contest on 9 September 2015. Between 2011 and 2015, BBC opted to internally select the British entry. For their 2016 entry, the broadcaster announced that a national final would be organised featuring a competition among several artists and songs to choose the British entry for Eurovision. This marked the first time since 2010 that a national final involving a public vote would be held to select United Kingdom's entry.

== Before Eurovision ==
=== Eurovision: You Decide ===
Eurovision: You Decide was the national final developed by the BBC in order to select the British entry for the Eurovision Song Contest 2016. Six acts competed in a televised show on 26 February 2016 held at The O2 Forum venue in Kentish Town, London and hosted by Mel Giedroyc. The winner was selected entirely through a public vote. The show was broadcast on BBC Four as well as streamed online via the BBC iPlayer and at the official Eurovision Song Contest website eurovision.tv. The national final was watched by 680,000 viewers in the United Kingdom with a market share of 3.2%.

==== Competing entries ====
On 30 September 2015, BBC announced an open submission for interested artists to submit their songs in the form of a video recording. The submission period lasted until 20 November 2015. The received submissions from the open call were reviewed and a shortlist was compiled by the UK branch of the international OGAE fan club. Additional entries were provided to the BBC by the British Academy of Songwriters, Composers and Authors (BASCA) which ran a songwriting competition amongst its members. The BBC also collaborated with the former music director of RCA Records and founder of Innocent Records, Hugh Goldsmith, to consult with music industry experts including writers, producers, artist managers and members of the British Phonographic Industry (BPI) in order to encourage entry submissions and involvement in the national final. Songs from all entry methods were included in a final shortlist which was presented to a professional panel that ultimately selected six finalists to compete in the national final. The six competing songs were premiered during The Ken Bruce Show on BBC Radio 2 on 22 February 2016.

==== Final ====
Six acts competed in the televised final on 26 February 2016. In addition to their performances, guest performers included previous Eurovision Song Contest winners Måns Zelmerlöw, who won the contest for Sweden in 2015 with the song "Heroes", and Katrina Leskanich, who won the contest for the United Kingdom in 1997 as the lead vocalist of the band Katrina and the Waves performing the song "Love Shine a Light". The show also featured a tribute to former British Eurovision Song Contest commentator Terry Wogan, who died in January 2016.

A panel of experts provided feedback regarding the songs during the show. The panel consisted of Katrina Leskanich, Carrie Grant (member of the 1983 British representatives Sweet Dreams, vocal coach and television presenter) and Jay Revell (staging director, dancer and actor). A public vote consisting of televoting and online voting selected the winner, "You're Not Alone" performed by Joe and Jake.

R/O	Artist	Song	Songwriter(s)
1	Dulcima	"When You Go"	Tomas Twyman
2	Matthew James	"A Better Man"	Helienne Lindvall; Andrew Fromm; Peter Kvint
3	Darline	"Until Tomorrow"	Roy Stride; Joshua Wilkinson; Duck Blackwell; Jack McManus
4	Karl William Lund	"Miracle"	Karl William Lund
5	Bianca	"Shine a Little Light"	Ash Howes; Leona Lewis; Cass Lowe; Richard Stannard
6	Joe and Jake	"You're Not Alone"	Matt Schwartz; Justin J. Benson; S. Kanes

=== Promotion ===
Joe and Jake made several appearances across Europe to specifically promote "You're Not Alone" as the British Eurovision entry. On 9 April, Joe and Jake performed during the Eurovision in Concert event which was held at the Melkweg venue in Amsterdam, Netherlands and hosted by Cornald Maas and Hera Björk. Joe and Jake performed "You're Not Alone" in the Netherlands during the RTL 4 programme Carlo's TV Café on 10 April. Between 11 and 13 April, Joe and Jake took part in promotional activities in Tel Aviv, Israel where they performed during the Israel Calling event held at the Ha'teatron venue and recorded a performance of "You're Not Alone" for the Israeli web portal Walla!.

In addition to their international appearances, on 15 April, Joe and Jake were part of the guest line-up for the BBC One programme The Graham Norton Show where they performed "You're Not Alone" live and were interviewed by host Graham Norton. On 17 April, Joe and Jake performed during the London Eurovision Party, which was held at the Café de Paris venue in London, United Kingdom and hosted by Nicki French and Paddy O'Connell.

== At Eurovision ==
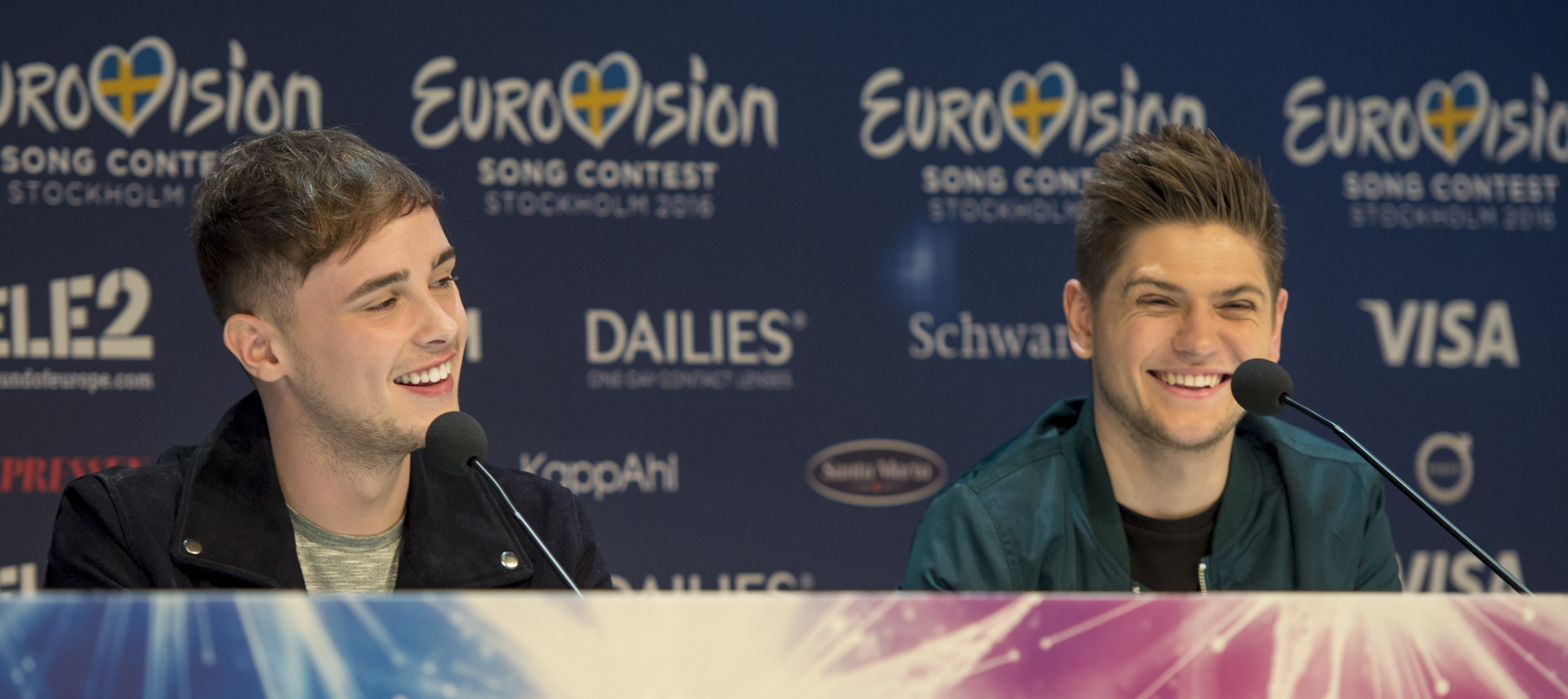
Joe and Jake during a press meet and greet

According to Eurovision rules, all nations with the exceptions of the host country and the "Big Five" (France, Germany, Italy, Spain and the United Kingdom) are required to compete in one of two semi-finals, and qualify in order to participate in the final; the top ten countries from each semi-final progress to the final. As a member of the "Big Five", the United Kingdom automatically qualified to compete in the final on 14 May 2016. In addition to their participation in the final, the United Kingdom is also required to broadcast and vote in one of the two semi-finals. During the semi-final allocation draw on 25 January 2016, the United Kingdom was assigned to broadcast and vote in the second semi-final on 12 May 2016.

In the United Kingdom, the semi-finals were broadcast on BBC Four with commentary by Scott Mills and Mel Giedroyc. Since their introduction to the format of the Eurovision Song Contest in 2004, the semi-finals had been broadcast in the United Kingdom on BBC Three; however, after BBC Three transitioned to an internet television service in February 2016, the semi-finals were moved to BBC Four. The final was televised on BBC One with commentary by Graham Norton and broadcast on BBC Radio 2 with commentary by Ken Bruce. The British spokesperson, who announced the top 12-point score awarded by the British jury during the final, was Richard Osman.

=== Final ===
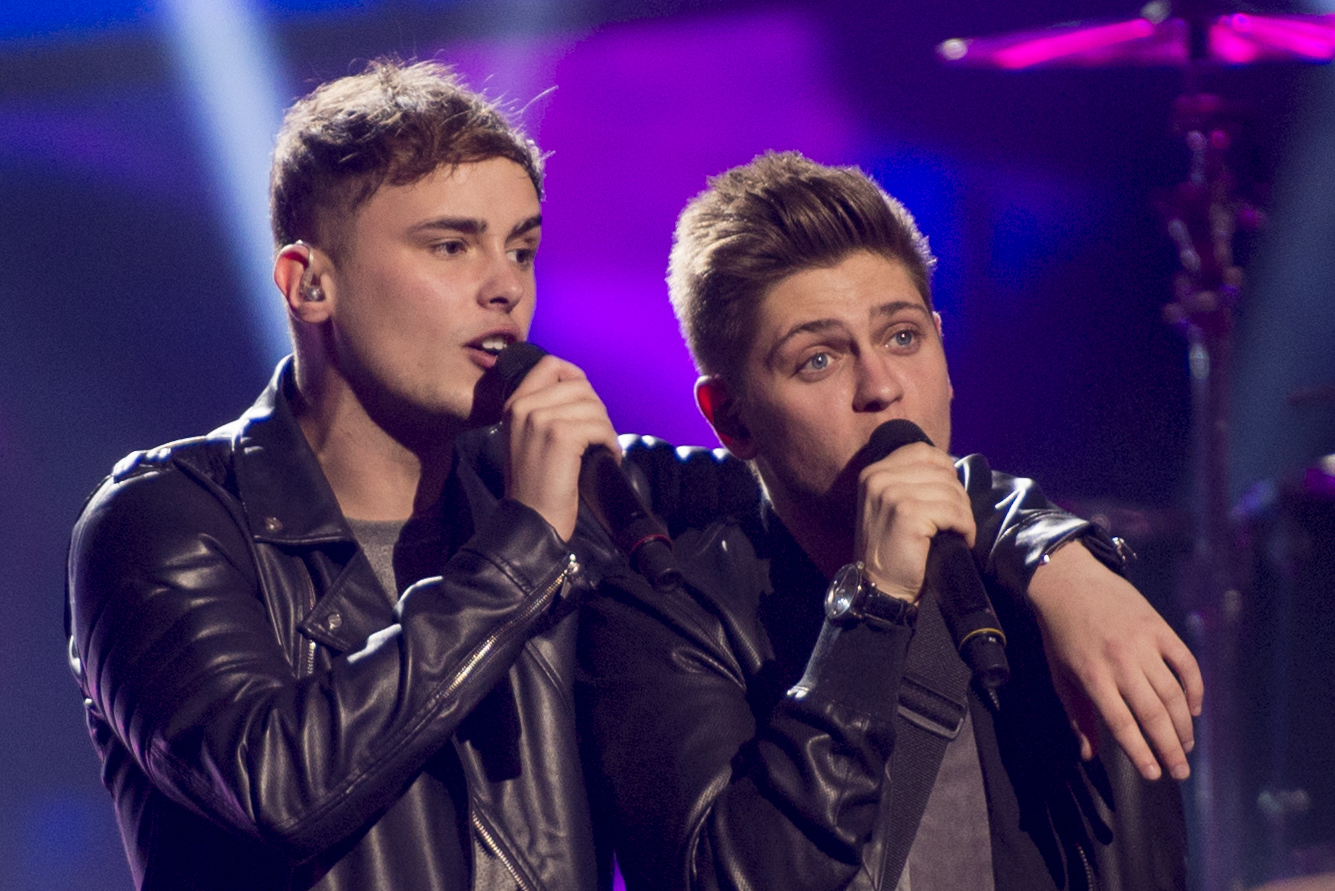
Joe and Jake during a rehearsal before the final

Joe and Jake took part in technical rehearsals on 7 and 8 May, followed by dress rehearsals on 11, 13 and 14 May. This included the semi-final jury show on 11 May where an extended clip of the British performance was filmed for broadcast during the live show on 12 May and the jury final on 13 May where the professional juries of each country watched and voted on the competing entries. During the opening ceremony festivities that took place on 8 May, Joe and Jake took part in a draw to determine in which half of the final the British entry would be performed. United Kingdom was drawn to compete in the second half. Following the conclusion of the second semi-final, the shows' producers decided upon the running order of the final. The running order for the semi-finals and final was decided by the shows' producers rather than through another draw, so that similar songs were not placed next to each other. United Kingdom was subsequently placed to perform in position 25, following the entry from Austria and before the entry from Armenia.

The British performance featured Joe and Jake performing on a predominately blue and purple coloured stage with the LED screens displaying images of people's faces from selfies that were submitted to the BBC. Additional spotlights were placed on the stage with two drummers positioned atop elevated platforms with lights. The supporting performers that joined Joe and Jake for the performance were Mikey Burke, Chris Moncrieff and Ross Harris. The United Kingdom placed twenty-fourth in the final, scoring 62 points: 8 points from the televoting and 54 points from the juries.

=== Voting ===
Voting during the three shows was conducted under a new system that involved each country now awarding two sets of points from 1-8, 10 and 12: one from their professional jury and the other from televoting. Each nation's jury consisted of five music industry professionals who are citizens of the country they represent, with their names published before the contest to ensure transparency. This jury judged each entry based on: vocal capacity; the stage performance; the song's composition and originality; and the overall impression by the act. In addition, no member of a national jury was permitted to be related in any way to any of the competing acts in such a way that they cannot vote impartially and independently. The individual rankings of each jury member as well as the nation's televoting results were released shortly after the grand final.

Below is a breakdown of points awarded to the United Kingdom and awarded by United Kingdom in the second semi-final and grand final of the contest, and the breakdown of the jury voting and televoting conducted during the two shows:

==== Points awarded to the United Kingdom ====
Points awarded to the United Kingdom (Final)
Score	Televote	Jury
12 points		Malta
10 points		
8 points		San Marino
7 points		Ireland
6 points		Russia
5 points		Albania
4 points	Australia	Australia; Czech Republic
3 points	Ireland	Denmark; Estonia
2 points		Serbia
1 point	Malta	

==== Points awarded by the United Kingdom ====
Points awarded by the United Kingdom (Semi-final 2)
Score	Televote	Jury
12 points	Lithuania	Georgia
10 points	Poland	Australia
8 points	Bulgaria	Lithuania
7 points	Ireland	Belgium
6 points	Australia	Ukraine
5 points	Latvia	Bulgaria
4 points	Belgium	Israel
3 points	Ukraine	Belarus
2 points	Israel	Ireland
1 point	Georgia	Norway

Points awarded by the United Kingdom (Final)
Score	Televote	Jury
12 points	Lithuania	Georgia
10 points	Poland	Ukraine
8 points	Bulgaria	Australia
7 points	Russia	Cyprus
6 points	Australia	France
5 points	Ukraine	Bulgaria
4 points	Spain	Lithuania
3 points	Latvia	Israel
2 points	Cyprus	Serbia
1 point	Sweden	Croatia

==== Detailed voting results ====
The following members comprised the British jury:

- CeCe Sammy (jury chairperson) – vocal coach, judge, vocalist, artist
- Seamus Haji – DJ, producer, remixer, A&R, record label owner, radio presenter, part-time music business tutor
- Sean McGhee – singer, producer, songwriter
- Bea Munro – singer, songwriter
- Kiran Thakrar – producer, composer

Detailed voting results from the United Kingdom (Semi-final 2)
R/O	Country	Jury							Televote	
R/O	Country	C. Sammy	S. Haji	S. McGhee	B. Munro	K. Thakrar	Rank	Points	Rank	Points
01	Latvia	5	14	7	12	16	11		6	5
02	Poland	8	16	11	14	5	12		2	10
03	Switzerland	17	10	8	9	17	16		18	
04	Israel	1	15	9	6	13	7	4	9	2
05	Belarus	16	8	2	11	9	8	3	13	
06	Serbia	12	13	17	7	11	15		17	
07	Ireland	6	5	5	18	15	9	2	4	7
08	Macedonia	18	18	18	16	18	18		14	
09	Lithuania	3	4	4	8	7	3	8	1	12
10	Australia	2	3	6	2	8	2	10	5	6
11	Slovenia	10	9	16	10	12	13		15	
12	Bulgaria	4	11	10	5	3	6	5	3	8
13	Denmark	13	17	13	17	14	17		11	
14	Ukraine	15	7	1	4	6	5	6	8	3
15	Norway	9	6	12	15	10	10	1	12	
16	Georgia	7	2	3	1	1	1	12	10	1
17	Albania	14	12	14	13	4	14		16	
18	Belgium	11	1	15	3	2	4	7	7	4

Detailed voting results from the United Kingdom (Final)
R/O	Country	Jury							Televote	
R/O	Country	C. Sammy	S. Haji	S. McGhee	B. Munro	K. Thakrar	Rank	Points	Rank	Points
01	Belgium	14	3	20	10	7	11		14	
02	Czech Republic	12	17	17	15	24	19		22	
03	Netherlands	8	19	15	8	17	14		12	
04	Azerbaijan	25	23	25	21	22	25		23	
05	Hungary	4	14	23	20	15	16		16	
06	Italy	13	20	18	22	25	22		20	
07	Israel	5	5	14	9	19	8	3	17	
08	Bulgaria	10	4	21	3	9	6	5	3	8
09	Sweden	24	25	9	25	23	24		10	1
10	Germany	19	24	19	23	14	23		21	
11	France	6	10	5	7	11	5	6	11	
12	Poland	16	21	24	14	8	18		2	10
13	Australia	3	6	6	4	12	3	8	5	6
14	Cyprus	1	7	2	11	16	4	7	9	2
15	Serbia	9	11	16	6	10	9	2	24	
16	Lithuania	7	8	13	19	3	7	4	1	12
17	Croatia	21	12	10	5	6	10	1	25	
18	Russia	20	16	11	13	2	13		4	7
19	Spain	17	18	22	16	21	21		7	4
20	Latvia	22	9	4	12	20	15		8	3
21	Ukraine	11	1	1	1	5	2	10	6	5
22	Malta	18	13	8	17	4	12		15	
23	Georgia	2	2	3	2	1	1	12	19	
24	Austria	23	15	12	18	13	17		13	
25	United Kingdom									
26	Armenia	15	22	7	24	18	20		18	
