= Where I Am =

Where I Am may refer to:

- Where I Am, an album by Tammy Cochran, or the title song, 2007
- Where I Am (EP), by Anja Nissen, 2017
  - "Where I Am", the title song, representing Denmark in the Eurovision Song Contest 2017
- "Where I Am", a song by the Funkoars, 2011
- "Where I Am", a song by Jake Owen from American Love, 2016
- "Where I Am", a song by Status Quo from On the Level, 1975
- Where I Am (film), a Canadian drama film
