= Konditor (company) =

UK cake company

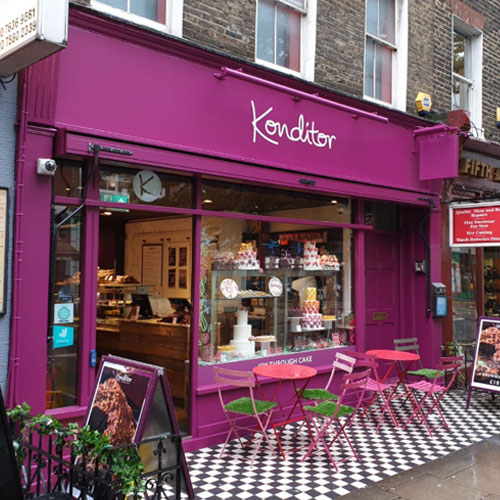
Former Goodge St branch

Konditor (formerly "Konditor & Cook") is a made-to-order cake bakery specialising in personalised celebration cakes in the United Kingdom. "Konditor" is the German word for confectioner or pastry chef.

The company was founded in 1993 by Gerhard Jenne as "Konditor & Cook" but changed its name to "Konditor" in 2018. The first shop is located at 22 Cornwall Rd, SE1 8TW on London's South Bank. There are also branches near Chancery Lane, London Bridge and The City, as well as a delivery and collection service.

== History ==
Owner Gerhard Jenne was born in Freiburg, Germany and trained as a baker and pastry chef in Munich; he then came to the United Kingdom in 1982. He first worked at the Swiss Centre in Leicester Square, London, and from 1983 to 1993 in Walton Street's Hygienic Bakery.

In 1993 Jenne took over the Queen of Hearts cake shop in Waterloo. It remains Konditor's flagship store.

In 2014, Konditor's Curly Whirly cake was featured during Eurovision when it was presented to British contestant Molly Smitten-Downes on air.
