= David Mindel =

British musician

David Richard Mindel (born 25 October 1946 in Twickenham, England) is a British songwriter, jingle writer and composer of music for film and television.

== Early life ==
Mindel was educated at Finchley County Grammar School in London which he left at sixteen to attend La Colline Language School in Vevey, Switzerland. A self-taught musician, Mindel teamed up with school friend David Seys to form the singing duo "David and David" in 1970. In 1972 EMI released two self-penned singles, "Good Morning Morning" and "In The City".

== Career ==
In 1972, Mindel joined the Noel Gay Organisation as a record plugger and junior A&R person. The company also published Mindel's songs, and the first to be recorded was "Let Him Go Home" by Canadian artist Nanette Workman and then by Palk Salad in 1971. In 1972 David Ballantyne and Solitude recorded "Roof Above Our Head" on the Regal Zonophone label with another Mindel composition "Sad Song of a Sad Man" as the B-side. Later that year Ballantyne formed a studio band called Esprit de Corps with future BBC Radio 1 DJ Mike Read, which recorded the Mindel song "If (Would it Turn Out Wrong?)" for Dick James's Jam label.

In 1974, Mindel teamed up with Noel Gay staff writer Gary Benson. Their first song, "Someday" of Long Live Love album, was sung by Olivia Newton-John in heats for the 1974 Eurovision Song Contest. The song was a hit in Hong Kong for Frances Yip and in Canada for Isabelle Aubret under the French title "Je Crois".

In 1975, Mindel and Benson had another entry in the Eurovision Song Contest, "Don't Throw It All Away" for Come on Over album performed by The Shadows, the single, released on the State Records label (State Records STAT10), reached No. 20 in the Record chart. The Nashville trio Dave and Sugar had a 1977 number 3 hit with it in the US, while the soul singer Stacy Lattisaw hit number nine on the US R&B charts with her version in 1992 and Barrington Levy scored a huge hit with a reggae version. It was also covered by artists as diverse as Gino Cunico, Ed Robinson, Fire and Rain, Carl Graves, The Delfonics, China Black, Lori Balmer, Helge Nielsens Orkester, Spectrum, Quench Aid, Barry Manilow and Jamie Sparks.

To date, there are around 200 recordings of Mindel's songs.

In 1975, Mindel left Noel Gay to set up the publishing company Cherry Music and continued to write with Gary Benson and others. As a producer he worked with David Seys and Dean Ford, Spoof, Little Big Man, Jackie Challenor, Reflections, Love Together and others. He wrote the "Shades" commercial for Crown Paints, recorded with the UK Symphony Orchestra, which had had a four-week run in the UK Singles Chart. It was later recorded by the South African National Symphony and String Fever. Mindel also wrote and recorded an album for Norwegian artist, Reidar.

In 2015, Still in Love With You was written by Adrian Bax White and David Mindel and was selected by the BBC from nearly five hundred songs entered to be the UK entry into the 60th Eurovision song contest. The song was performed with 27 other songs in Vienna on 23 May and came 24th.

=== Jingles and commercials ===
In 1974, Mindel joined forces with David Seys to launch the advertising jingle company Mingles Music, writing and recording more than 4,000 television and radio commercials. Campaigns included the McDonald's generic theme for Ireland and Portugal, Action Man toys, Maxwell House coffee, McVities, Bisto, Bank of Scotland, Ballantine's whiskey, Chambourcy, Cadbury's, Budweiser, Brooke Bond, Betty Crocker, Dr. Pepper, Kellogg's, Lancome, KFC, Mars, Rothmans, Ryanair, Thomas Cook, Polyhilites, KP Nuts and many others.

=== Television, film and theatre ===
Mindel has composed themes for many UK television programmes including "Jim'll Fix It", which Time out magazine ranked the 11th greatest theme song in the history of British television. He also wrote the current themes for "The National Lottery" and "EuroMillions". Other UK television credits include "Food and Drink", "Open House", "Harty", "Challenge Anneka", "Boom", "The Hot Shoe Show", "Passport", "Get Your Act Together", "House Hunters", "The District Nurse", "Rory Bremner, Who Else?", "Coogan's Run" and others. He scored two award-winning documentaries, "All The King's Horses", a film about Budweiser's Clydesdale horses, and "Concertos", about whisky making in Scotland (from which the soundtrack was released). He also scored the feature films "Real Life" starring Cristina Raines and Rupert Everett, and "Bob's Weekend". He composed the musical Soul Searchers.

=== "Issues" project with The Band of Sisters ===
In 2012, Mindel had the idea of cowriting with women songwriters a collection of songs that deal with issues of special significance to woman, such as domestic abuse, depression, and bullying. The 2013 CD "Issues" by The Band of Sisters comprises sixteen songs, by women, about women, for women. Performers include Tessa Niles, Lynda Hayes, Mim Grey, Miriam Stockley, Stevie Lange, Alissa Moreno, Leigh Matty, PP Arnold, Mandy Bell, Jacqi Michaels, Tor Richards, Angela Kaset, Kim Alvord, Monica Ward, and Alison Joy Williams. Versions of the project have been performed live in London and in Nashville, TN.

== Honours and awards ==
Mindel has given master classes in commercial music at the Royal College of Music in London. He has been commissioned to write music for Royal Ballet stars Wayne Eagling and Wayne Sleep. He has received two ASCAP awards, an Ivor Novello Award nomination, three New York Clio Awards, an ILR statuette, and one from the Jameson Dublin International Film Festival, among many others.

In 2018, three of Mindel's songs are included on an Eve Graham CD, four on an album by Dead Crow Road, and a single by Eurovision duo Electro Velvet, Take Me Home was released in September.

== Personal life ==
In February 1975, Mindel married Cherry Gillespie, actress and dancer with the BBC dance troupe Pan's People. They were divorced in September 1989. On 3 March 2010, he married Darcie Gage, with whom he lives in the south of France.
