= Lighthouse X =

Danish pop group

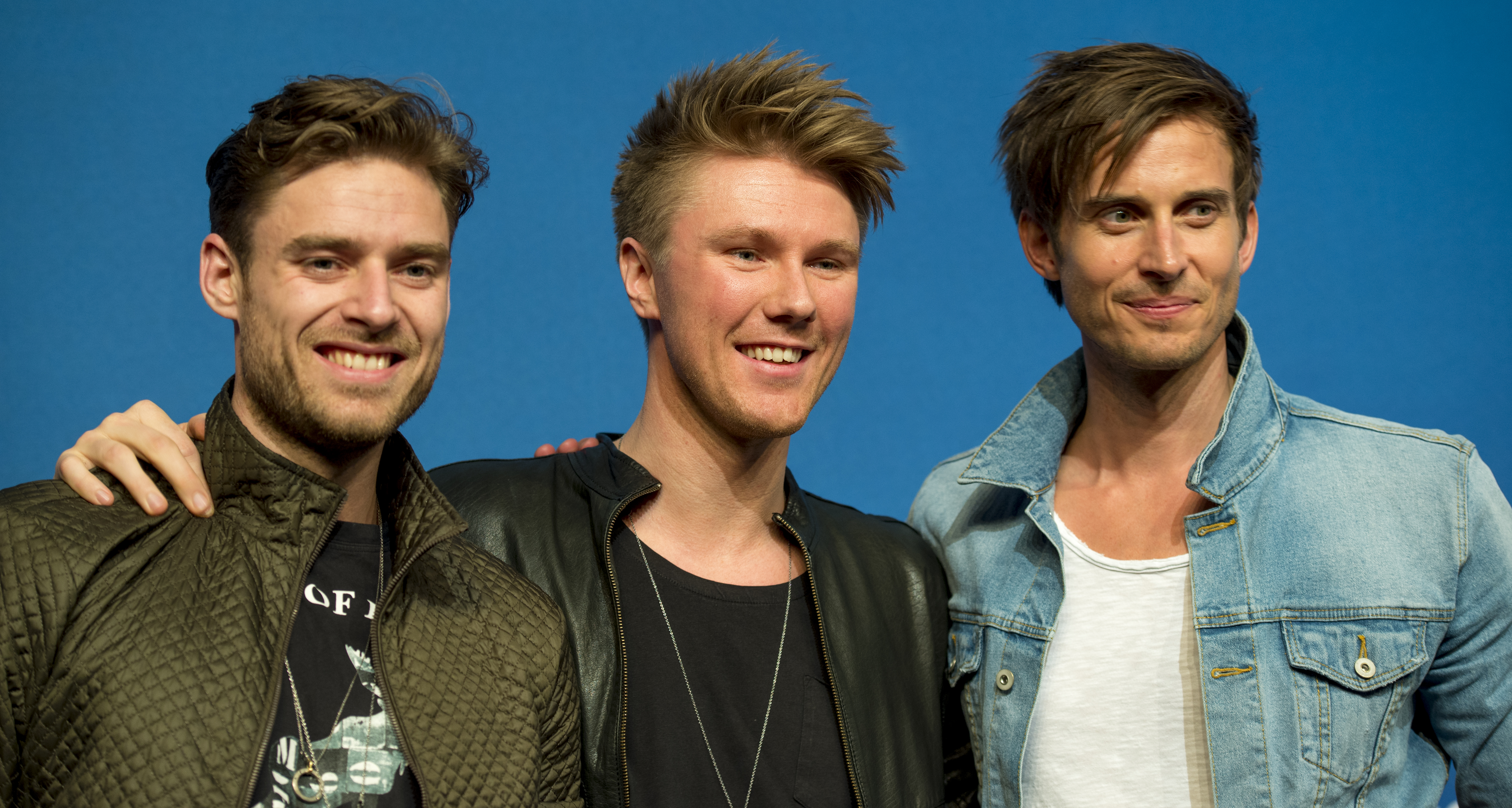
- Lighthouse X in 2016

Background information
- Origin: Denmark
- Genres: Pop
- Years active: 2012–2016
- Members: Søren Bregendal; Johannes Nymark; Martin Skriver
- Website: http://www.lhx.dk/

Lighthouse X (pronounced "Lighthouse Ten") was a Danish boyband consisting of Søren Bregendal, Johannes Nymark and Martin Skriver.

The band was formed in 2012 with the goal of helping people who face challenges in their lives. They work as ambassadors of three different non-profit organizations who also receive a percentage of the groups profit. They represented Denmark in the Eurovision Song Contest 2016 in Stockholm with the song "Soldiers of Love". Lighthouse X disbanded in August 2016.

== Career ==
=== 2014–15: Lighthouse X ===
On 13 October 2014 Lighthouse X released their debut single "Kærligheden kalder". The song peaked at number 37 on the Danish Singles Chart After a second single, "Hjerteløst", the band released their debut self-titled EP Lighthouse X on 16 February 2015. On 16 April 2015 they released the single "Nattens gløder". Other singles from 2015 include "It's a Brand New Day" and "Home".

=== 2016: Eurovision Song Contest ===
In February 2016 the band took part in Dansk Melodi Grand Prix 2016, the music competition that selects Denmark's entries for the Eurovision Song Contest. The competition was held on 13 February 2016 at the Forum Horsens in Horsens. The band performed "Soldiers of Love" in the Final making it through to the Super final winning with 42% of the public vote.

They performed at the Eurovision Song Contest 2016 during the second semi-final on 12 May 2016, but failed to qualify to the May 14 final of the competition. "Soldiers of Love" placed 17th in the second semi-final.

Johannes Nymark, a member of the band, had previously been a keyboard player for Italy at the Eurovision Song Contest 2014. Søren Bregendal, another member of the band, had previously been a member of the boy band C21 and has since returned to the group. Bregendal also appeared in seasons 2 and 3 of the Netflix television series Emily in Paris as Erik de Groot.

In August 2016, the band announced that they were disbanding with a last appearance during Copenhagen Pride on 17 August 2016.

== Discography ==
=== Extended plays ===
Title	Details
Lighthouse X	Released: 16 February 2015; Label: North-East Production; Format: Digital download

=== Singles ===
Title	Year	Peak chart positions	Certifications	Album
Title	Year	DEN	Certifications	Album
"Kærligheden kalder"	2014	37		Lighthouse X
"Hjerteløst"	2015	—		Lighthouse X
"Nattens gløder"	2015	—		Lighthouse X
"It's a Brand New Day"	2015	—		Non-album singles
"Home"	2015	—		Non-album singles
"Soldiers of Love"	2016	12	IFPI DEN: Gold	Non-album singles
"—" denotes a single that did not chart or was not released.

Awards and achievements
Preceded by Anti Social Media with "The Way You Are"	Denmark in the Eurovision Song Contest; 2016	Succeeded by Anja Nissen with "Where I Am"
