= Kristel Lisberg =

- Born: 6 December 1988 (age 37); Tórshavn, Faroe Islands
- Origin: Tvøroyri, Faroe Islands
- Genres: Pop; country
- Occupations: Singer; songwriter; optometrist
- Instruments: Vocals; piano
- Years active: 2001–present

Kristel Lisberg is a Faroese singer, songwriter. She currently lives in Denmark where she rose to fame after participating in the Danish version of X Factor. In 2014 she released the single "Without You", and in 2015 the follow-up single "September". She participated in Dansk Melodi Grand Prix 2016, the Danish national selection for the Eurovision Song Contest with the song "Who Needs a Heart?".

Kristel started performing at an early age together with her father Jens Lisberg, who is a well-known Faroese country singer.

== Discography ==
=== Extended plays ===
- 2003 – Ain't No Love

=== Singles ===
- 2003 – "Ain't No Love"
- 2011 – "In the Lights"
- 2014 – "Without You"
- 2015 – "September"
- 2016 – "Who Needs a Heart"
- 2020 – "Contagious"
- 2020 – "I Only Want You"
- 2021 – "Stars in the Summer Night" (nebenGesjæft feat. Kristel Lisberg)
- 2022 – "It's Killing Me"
- 2023 – "One Slow Burn"
- 2025 – "Say Goodbye"

== Honours ==
- 2015 – Nominated for the Faroese Music Awards in the category Best female singer
- 2012 – Nominated for the Planet Awards in the category Best new artist/band
