= Denmark in the Eurovision Song Contest 2016 =

- Eurovision Song Contest 2016
- Country: Denmark
- Selection process: Melodi Grand Prix 2016
- Selection date: 13 February 2016

Competing entry
- Song: "Soldiers of Love"
- Artist: Lighthouse X
- Songwriters: Sebastian F. Ovens; Daniel Lund Jørgensen; Katrine Klith Andersen; Søren Bregendal; Johannes Nymark; Martin Skriver

Placement
- Semi-final result: Failed to qualify (17th)

Participation chronology

Denmark was represented at the Eurovision Song Contest 2016 with the song "Soldiers of Love" written by Sebastian F. Ovens, Daniel Lund Jørgensen, Katrine Klith Andersen, Søren Bregendal, Johannes Nymark and Martin Skriver. The song was performed by the group Lighthouse X. The Danish broadcaster DR organised the national final Melodi Grand Prix 2016 in order to select the Danish entry for the 2016 contest in Stockholm, Sweden. Ten songs competed in a televised show where the winner was selected over two rounds of voting. The results of the first round were decided upon through the combination of jury voting and public voting while in the second round, the winner was selected solely by public televoting. "Soldiers of Love" performed by Lighthouse X was the winner after gaining 42% of the public vote.

Denmark was drawn to compete in the second semi-final of the Eurovision Song Contest which took place on 12 May 2016. Performing during the show in position 13, "Soldiers of Love" was not announced among the top 10 entries of the second semi-final and therefore did not qualify to compete in the final. It was later revealed that Denmark placed seventeenth out of the 18 participating countries in the semi-final with 34 points, effectively making it the worst result for Denmark in Eurovision since its debut in 1957.

== Background ==
Prior to the 2016 contest, Denmark had participated in the Eurovision Song Contest forty-four times since its first entry in 1957. Denmark had won the contest, to this point, on three occasions: in 1963 with the song "Dansevise" performed by Grethe and Jørgen Ingmann, in 2000 with the song "Fly on the Wings of Love" performed by Olsen Brothers, and in 2013 with the song "Only Teardrops" performed by Emmelie de Forest. In the 2015 contest, "The Way You Are" performed by Anti Social Media failed to qualify Denmark to the final; the last time the nation had failed to qualify to the final was in 2007.

The Danish national broadcaster, DR, broadcasts the event within Denmark and organises the selection process for the nation's entry. DR confirmed their intentions to participate at the 2016 Eurovision Song Contest on 26 May 2015. Denmark has selected all of their Eurovision entries through the national final Dansk Melodi Grand Prix. On 30 June 2015, the broadcaster announced that Dansk Melodi Grand Prix 2016 would be organised in order to select Denmark's entry for the 2016 contest.

== Before Eurovision ==
=== Melodi Grand Prix 2016 ===
Melodi Grand Prix 2016 was the 46th edition of Dansk Melodi Grand Prix, the music competition that selects Denmark's entries for the Eurovision Song Contest. The event was held on 13 February 2016 at the Forum Horsens in Horsens, hosted by Jacob Riising and Annette Heick with Hilda Heick hosting segments from the green room. The show was televised on DR1 as well as streamed online at the official DR website. In addition, the show was also broadcast via radio on DR P4 with commentary by René Sabro and Anders Bisgaard.

==== Format ====
Ten songs competed in one show where the winner was determined over two rounds of voting. In the first round, the top three songs based on the combination of votes from a public vote and a five-member jury panel qualified to the superfinal. In the superfinal, the winner was determined exclusively by a public vote. Viewers were able to vote via SMS or a newly introduced mobile application specifically designed for the competition. Viewers using the app to cast a vote were provided with one free vote.

The five-member jury panel was composed of:

- Vicky Leander – choreographer and stage director
- Christina Chanée – singer, represented Denmark in 2010
- John Gordon – songwriter, wrote Germany's Eurovision Song Contest 2010 winning song "Satellite"
- Dennis Johannessen – radio host on DR P4
- Mette Thorning Svendsen – member of OGAE Denmark

Johann Sørensen, president of OGAE Denmark, was originally part of the five-member jury panel, however, DR later expelled him after he publicly endorsed some of the competing entries in a press interview. DR later named Mette Thorning Svendsen as the replacement juror.

==== Competing entries ====
DR opened a submission period between 30 June 2015 and 7 September 2015 for artists and composers to submit their entries. The entertainment director for DR, Jan Lagermand Lundme, stated that the competition would seek out "songs in all genres, not just the typical Eurovision songs" with emphasis on songs that have a strong and catchy chorus. The broadcaster received a record breaking 982 entries during the submission period; the previous record was set in 2014 when the broadcaster received 872 entries. A selection committee selected six to seven songs from the entries submitted to the broadcaster. The entries were selected by a committee of industry professionals that was headed by music producer Cutfather and included music producer Jonas Schroeder, who had been affiliated with the Dansk Melodi Grand Prix since 2013. Three to four of the participants were invited to compete based on editorial considerations.

The competing artists and songs were to be officially presented on 28 January 2016, however, the entries were leaked on 10 January 2016 via the streaming service Spotify. DR subsequently confirmed the list of participants and held a press meet and greet at the Koncerthuset in Copenhagen on 13 January. Following the presentation and release of the entries, the song "Never Alone" performed by Anja Nissen was accused of breaching the rules of the competition as the co-writer and Eurovision Song Contest 2013 winner Emmelie de Forest had performed the song during concerts in 2014. After consulting the European Broadcasting Union, DR confirmed that the song was eligible to compete to represent Denmark at the Eurovision Song Contest.

Artist	Song	Songwriter(s)
Anja Nissen	"Never Alone"	Emmelie de Forest, Rune Westberg, Maureen Anne McDonald
Bracelet	"Breakaway"	Jimmy Jansson, Rebecca Krogmann, Charlie Grönvall, Felix Grönvall, Nanne Grönvall
David Jay	"Rays of Sunlight"	Brian Risberg Clausen, Christoffer Stjerne
Jessica	"Break it Good"	Engelina Larsen, Tommy P. Gregersen, David Todua
Kristel Lisberg	"Who Needs a Heart"	Jonas Gladnikoff, Sara Ljunggren
Lighthouse X	"Soldiers of Love"	Sebastian F. Ovens, Daniel Lund Jørgensen, Katrine Klith Andersen, Søren Bregendal, Johannes Nymark, Martin Skriver
Muri og Mario	"To stjerner"	Mads Løkkegaard, Gianluigi Fazio, Murad Mahmoud, Mario Sciacca
Simone	"Heart Shaped Hole"	Andrew Love, Carl Ryden
Sophia Nohr	"Blue Horizon"	Marie Keis Uhre, Christoffer Lauridsen
Veronicas Illusion	"The Wrong Kind"	Dimitri Stassos, Peter Boström, Tobias Stigaard Stenkjær, Freja Jonsson Blomberg

==== Final ====
The final took place on 13 February 2016. The running order was determined by DR and announced on 1 February 2016. In the first round of voting the top three advanced to the superfinal based on the votes of a five-member jury (50%) and a public vote (50%). In the superfinal, the winner, "Soldiers of Love" performed by Lighthouse X, was selected solely by a public vote. In addition to the performances of the competing entries, Swedish Eurovision Song Contest 2012 winner Loreen performed as the interval act.

Final – 13 February 2016
R/O	Artist	Song	Result
1	David Jay	"Rays of Sunlight"	—N/a
2	Simone	"Heart Shaped Hole"	Advanced
3	Bracelet	"Breakaway"	—N/a
4	Sophia Nohr	"Blue Horizon"	—N/a
5	Veronicas Illusion	"The Wrong Kind"	—N/a
6	Lighthouse X	"Soldiers of Love"	Advanced
7	Kristel Lisberg	"Who Needs a Heart"	—N/a
8	Jessica	"Break it Good"	—N/a
9	Muri og Mario	"To stjerner"	—N/a
10	Anja Nissen	"Never Alone"	Advanced

Superfinal – 13 February 2016
R/O	Artist	Song	Televote	Place
1	Simone	"Heart Shaped Hole"	22%	3
2	Lighthouse X	"Soldiers of Love"	42%	1
3	Anja Nissen	"Never Alone"	36%	2

== At Eurovision ==
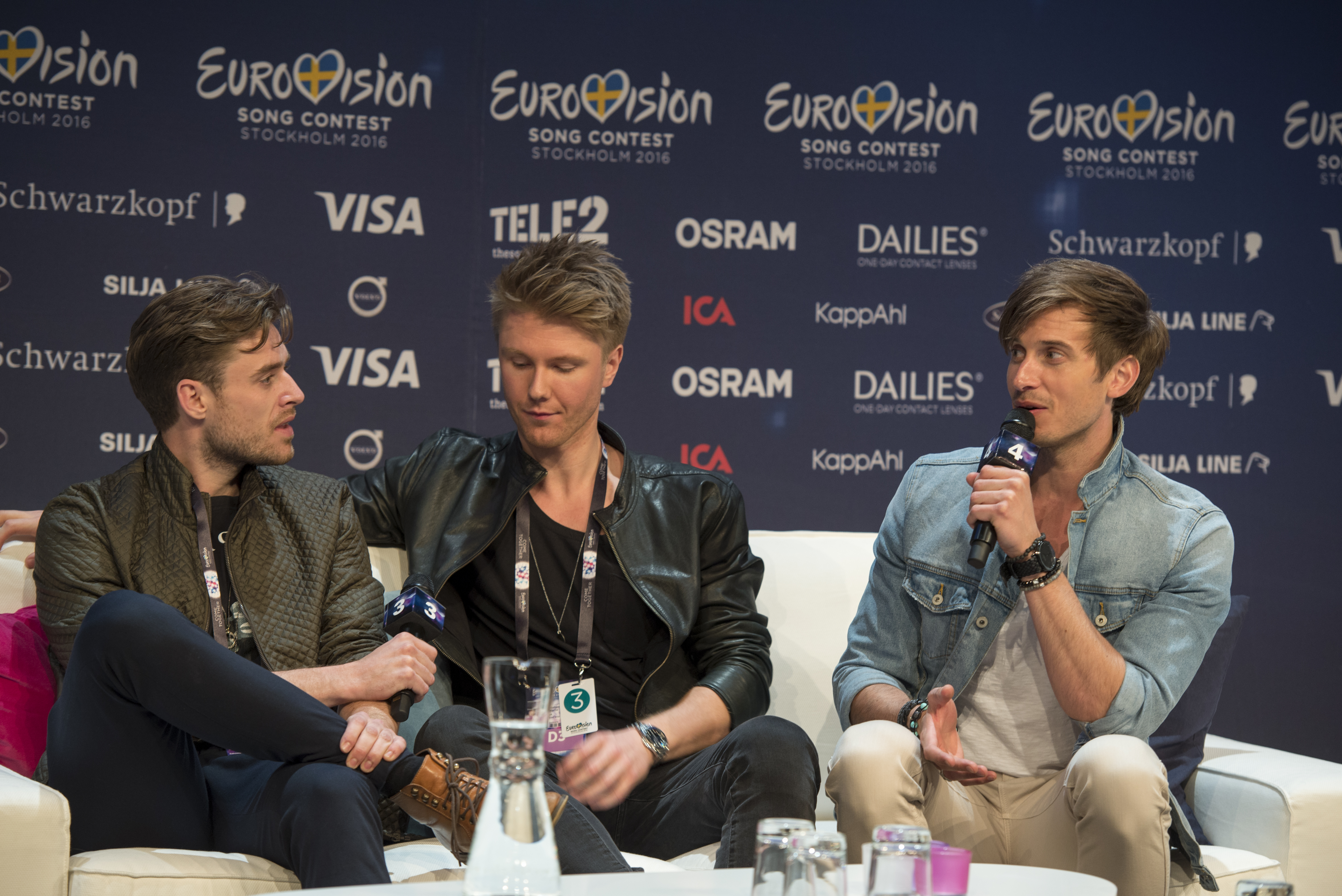
Lighthouse X during a press meet and greet

According to Eurovision rules, all nations with the exceptions of the host country and the "Big Five" (France, Germany, Italy, Spain and the United Kingdom) are required to qualify from one of two semi-finals in order to compete for the final; the top ten countries from each semi-final progress to the final. The European Broadcasting Union (EBU) split up the competing countries into six different pots based on voting patterns from previous contests, with countries with favourable voting histories put into the same pot. On 25 January 2016, a special allocation draw was held which placed each country into one of the two semi-finals, as well as which half of the show they would perform in. Denmark was placed into the second semi-final, to be held on 12 May 2016, and was scheduled to perform in the second half of the show.

Once all the competing songs for the 2016 contest had been released, the running order for the semi-finals was decided by the shows' producers rather than through another draw, so that similar songs were not placed next to each other. Originally, Denmark was set to perform in position 14, following the entry from Bulgaria and before the entry from Ukraine. But after Romania was removed from the running order of the competition, Denmark's position shifted to 13.

The two semi-finals and final were broadcast on DR1 with commentary by Ole Tøpholm. DR Ramasjang also broadcast the three shows interpreted in International Sign for the deaf and sign language users. The Danish spokesperson, who announced the top 12-point score awarded by the Danish jury during the final, was Ulla Essendrop.

=== Semi-final ===
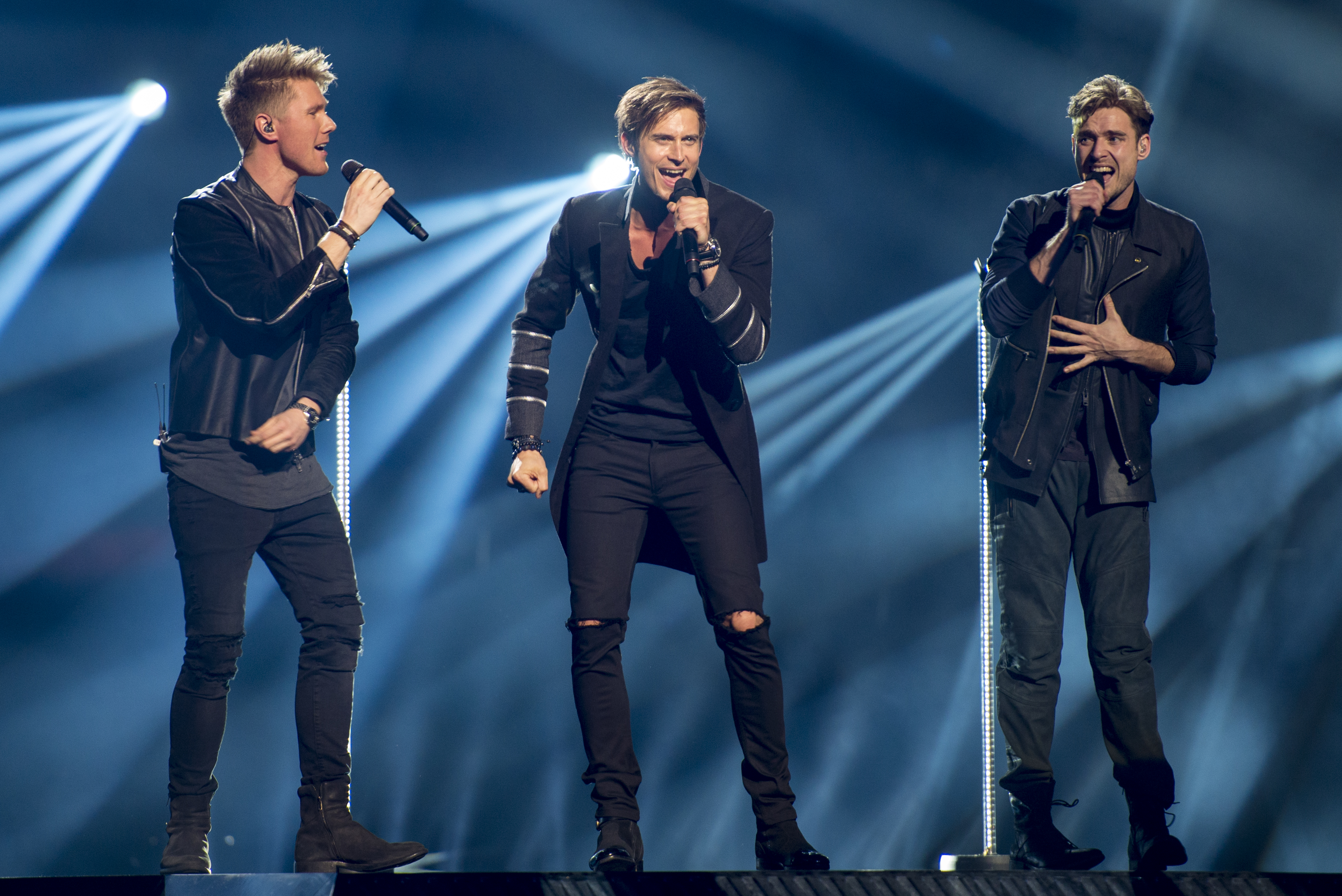
Lighthouse X during a rehearsal before the second semi-final

Lighthouse X took part in technical rehearsals on 5 and 7 May, followed by dress rehearsals on 11 and 12 May. This included the jury show on 11 May where the professional juries of each country watched and voted on the competing entries.

The Danish performance featured the members of Lighthouse X dressed in black outfits and performing a routine around microphone stands that light up. The stage colours were predominantly blue and white and the members of Lighthouse X finished their performance on the satellite stage with a pyrotechnic fountain effect. Lighthouse X was joined by three off-stage backing vocalists: Søren Okholm, Christoffer Brodersen and Anders Ørsager.

At the end of the show, Denmark was not announced among the top 10 entries in the second semi-final and therefore failed to qualify to compete in the final. It was later revealed that Denmark placed seventeenth in the semi-final, receiving a total of 34 points: 24 points from the televoting and 10 points from the juries.

=== Voting ===
Voting during the three shows was conducted under a new system that involved each country now awarding two sets of points from 1-8, 10 and 12: one from their professional jury and the other from televoting. Each nation's jury consisted of five music industry professionals who are citizens of the country they represent, with their names published before the contest to ensure transparency. This jury judged each entry based on: vocal capacity; the stage performance; the song's composition and originality; and the overall impression by the act. In addition, no member of a national jury was permitted to be related in any way to any of the competing acts in such a way that they cannot vote impartially and independently. The individual rankings of each jury member as well as the nation's televoting results were released shortly after the grand final. One of the jurists, however, Hilda Heick, misunderstood the voting process and, in the final, inverted her ranking, placing her favourite song last and her least-favourite song first, resulting in Denmark giving 12 points to Ukraine instead of Australia.

Below is a breakdown of points awarded to Denmark and awarded by Denmark in the second semi-final and grand final of the contest, and the breakdown of the jury voting and televoting conducted during the two shows:

==== Points awarded to Denmark ====
Points awarded to Denmark (Semi-final 2)
Score	Televote	Jury
12 points		
10 points		
8 points		
7 points		
6 points		
5 points	Belgium; Norway	
4 points	Israel	Georgia
3 points	Ireland	Albania; Belarus
2 points	Albania; Latvia	
1 point	Australia; Poland; Switzerland	

==== Points awarded by Denmark ====
Points awarded by Denmark (Semi-final 2)
Score	Televote	Jury
12 points	Belgium	Australia
10 points	Norway	Lithuania
8 points	Australia	Belgium
7 points	Lithuania	Bulgaria
6 points	Poland	Norway
5 points	Ukraine	Israel
4 points	Ireland	Ireland
3 points	Bulgaria	Latvia
2 points	Latvia	Switzerland
1 point	Belarus	Ukraine

Points awarded by Denmark (Final)
Score	Televote	Jury
12 points	Sweden	Ukraine
10 points	Australia	Australia
8 points	Belgium	Belgium
7 points	Netherlands	Netherlands
6 points	Lithuania	Bulgaria
5 points	Poland	Lithuania
4 points	Russia	Sweden
3 points	Ukraine	United Kingdom
2 points	France	Israel
1 point	Austria	Spain

==== Detailed voting results ====
The following members comprised the Danish jury:

- Kaya Brüel (jury chairperson) – singer, songwriter, actress
- Hilda Heick – singer, songwriter
- Jimmy Jørgensen – musician, singer, songwriter, actor
- Morten Specht – drummer
- Anis Basim Moujahid (Basim) – singer, songwriter, represented Denmark in 2014

Detailed voting results from Denmark (Semi-final 2)
R/O	Country	Jury							Televote	
R/O	Country	K. Brüel	H. Heick	J. Jørgensen	M. Specht	Basim	Rank	Points	Rank	Points
01	Latvia	6	11	13	2	9	8	3	9	2
02	Poland	12	16	14	9	13	16		5	6
03	Switzerland	14	7	12	7	3	9	2	17	
04	Israel	7	13	3	10	7	6	5	11	
05	Belarus	15	8	9	11	15	13		10	1
06	Serbia	16	6	15	14	10	14		14	
07	Ireland	5	17	7	6	6	7	4	7	4
08	Macedonia	17	1	16	17	17	17		15	
09	Lithuania	3	15	4	3	2	2	10	4	7
10	Australia	1	12	2	1	1	1	12	3	8
11	Slovenia	9	14	6	8	11	11		13	
12	Bulgaria	4	5	5	12	8	4	7	8	3
13	Denmark									
14	Ukraine	13	2	1	16	12	10	1	6	5
15	Norway	8	9	8	5	5	5	6	2	10
16	Georgia	10	3	10	13	16	12		12	
17	Albania	11	4	17	15	14	15		16	
18	Belgium	2	10	11	4	4	3	8	1	12

Detailed voting results from Denmark (Final)
R/O	Country	Jury							Televote	
R/O	Country	K. Brüel	H. Heick	J. Jørgensen	M. Specht	Basim	Rank	Points	Rank	Points
01	Belgium	3	22	8	8	3	3	8	3	8
02	Czech Republic	17	10	16	19	19	19		25	
03	Netherlands	2	25	12	6	4	4	7	4	7
04	Azerbaijan	23	14	25	26	13	26		22	
05	Hungary	16	12	21	20	22	24		17	
06	Italy	14	18	13	11	12	12		14	
07	Israel	11	19	2	16	9	9	2	16	
08	Bulgaria	7	16	4	17	6	5	6	11	
09	Sweden	5	20	17	10	2	7	4	1	12
10	Germany	20	6	14	24	23	23		19	
11	France	6	23	18	2	20	14		9	2
12	Poland	21	17	15	18	26	25		6	5
13	Australia	1	26	1	1	1	2	10	2	10
14	Cyprus	26	9	9	21	10	16		18	
15	Serbia	25	5	22	12	14	18		24	
16	Lithuania	13	15	7	7	11	6	5	5	6
17	Croatia	12	3	23	22	25	22		26	
18	Russia	9	24	11	9	15	13		7	4
19	Spain	22	21	6	3	8	10	1	12	
20	Latvia	18	13	19	4	16	15		13	
21	Ukraine	4	2	3	14	5	1	12	8	3
22	Malta	19	8	24	13	17	20		23	
23	Georgia	24	1	10	23	24	21		20	
24	Austria	10	7	26	15	18	17		10	1
25	United Kingdom	8	11	5	25	7	8	3	15	
26	Armenia	15	4	20	5	21	11		21	
