= Kærligheden kalder =

Single by Lighthouse X

from the album Lighthouse X
- Released: 13 October 2014
- Recorded: 2013/14
- Genre: Pop
- Length: 4:11
- Label: North-East Production

Lighthouse X singles chronology
"Kærligheden kalder" (2014)	"Hjerteløst" (2015)

"Kærligheden kalder" is the debut single by Danish boyband Lighthouse X. The song was released as a digital download in Denmark on 13 October 2014 through North-East Production. The song was released as the lead single from their debut self-titled EP. The song peaked to number 37 on the Danish Singles Chart.

== Track listing ==
Digital download
No.	Title	Length
1.	"Kærligheden Kalder"	4:11

== Chart performance ==
=== Weekly charts ===
Chart (2016)	Peak position
Denmark (Tracklisten)	37

== Release history ==
Region	Date	Format	Label
Denmark	13 October 2014	Digital download	North-East Production
