= Joe and Jake =

British musical duo

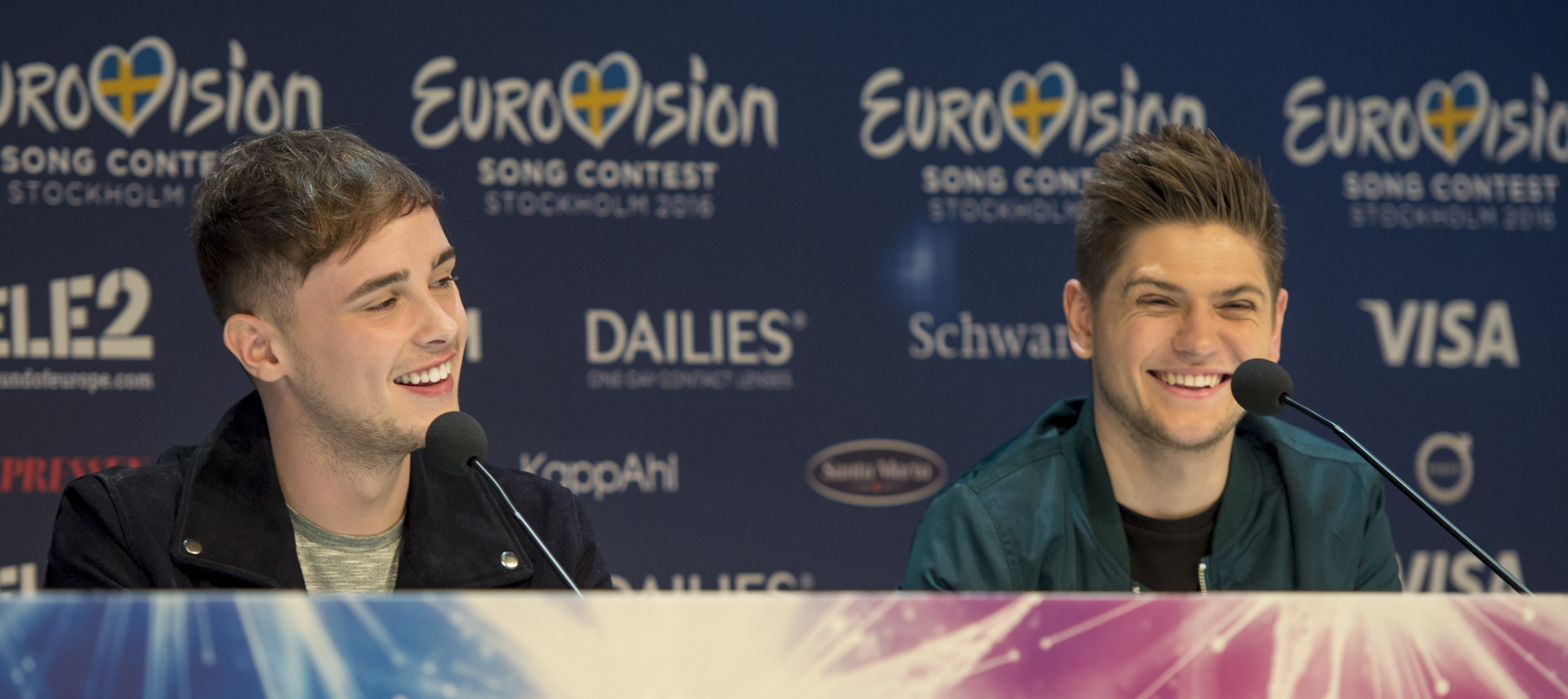
- Joe and Jake at a press conference during the Eurovision Song Contest 2016 in Stockholm.

Background information
- Origin: Ruthin, Wales (Joe); Stoke-on-Trent, England (Jake)
- Genres: Pop
- Years active: 2015–2017
- Labels: Sony Music UK
- Members: Joe Woolford (1994); Jake Shakeshaft (1995)
- Website: http://www.joeandjakemusic.com

Joe and Jake were a British duo consisting of Joe Woolford and Jake Shakeshaft. They represented the United Kingdom in the Eurovision Song Contest 2016 in Stockholm with the song "You're Not Alone". In 2015, they both participated in the fourth series of the talent show The Voice UK and became a duo after the show ended.

== Career ==
=== 2015: The Voice UK ===
Woolford and Shakeshaft met in 2015 during the fourth series of The Voice UK. They both made it through the Blind auditions; Shakeshaft performed "Thinking Out Loud" by Ed Sheeran and Woolford performed "Lights" by Ellie Goulding. In the Battle rounds, Woolford and Shakeshaft both won and progressed to the Knockout rounds; Shakeshaft performed "Every Teardrop Is a Waterfall" by Coldplay and Woolford performed "I Won't Give Up" by Jason Mraz. In the Knockout round, Shakeshaft performed the song "As Long as You Love Me" by Justin Bieber but was eliminated. Woolford performed the song "Hey Ya!" by OutKast and progressed to the live shows. In Week 1, Woolford performed the song "Don't Wake Me Up" by Chris Brown, and he advanced to the next round. In Week 2, he was eliminated from the competition after singing "Jealous" by Labrinth.

==== Performances ====
Performed	Song	Original artist	Result
Joe Woolford
Blind audition	"Lights"	Ellie Goulding	Joined Team Rita Ora
Battle round	"I Won't Give Up" (against Ryan Green)	Jason Mraz	Won the Battle and advanced
Knockout round	"Hey Ya!"	OutKast	Advanced to Live shows
Week 1	"Don't Wake Me Up"	Chris Brown	Advanced
Week 2	"Jealous"	Labrinth	Eliminated
Jake Shakeshaft
Blind audition	"Thinking Out Loud"	Ed Sheeran	Joined Team will.i.am
Battle round	"Every Teardrop Is a Waterfall" (against Stephen Cornwell)	Coldplay	Won the Battle and advanced
Knockout round	"As Long as You Love Me"	Justin Bieber	Eliminated

=== 2016: Eurovision Song Contest ===
During The Voice UK Woolford and Shakeshaft became good friends and decided to pair up to enter Eurovision: You Decide, the national final developed by the BBC to select the British entry for the Eurovision Song Contest 2016. They were one of six acts who competed in the national final and they won the contest which was selected entirely through a public vote consisting of televoting and online voting. They performed the song "You're Not Alone" in the Final on 14 May 2016 at the Ericsson Globe in Stockholm, Sweden. On 11 March 2016, it was announced that Joe and Jake had signed a record deal with Sony Music UK. Woolford and Shakeshaft came 24th in the Eurovision Song Contest 2016.

== Members ==
=== Joe Woolford ===
Joseph Woolford is from Ruthin in Wales. He reached the Grand Final of the Open Mic UK competition between 2013 and 2014. Woolford is a rapper and a singer/songwriter. He was first influenced by Tupac Amaru Shakur also known as 2Pac.

Interviewed in 2016, by Attitude magazine, Woolford was asked about how the duo came about and said, "It was so simple and straight forward for us, it just clicked straight away. We obviously met on The Voice and we always had a laugh together, and then we started writing together and met up at various gigs and we were like, 'you know what, let's see what it sounds like with us singing together' and luckily for us it sounded really good! We're really happy it worked out how it did otherwise we wouldn't be sat here signed to Sony and representing the UK in Eurovision."

In May 2018, Woolford joined swing vocal group Jack Pack, replacing original member, Alfie Palmer.

=== Jake Shakeshaft ===
Jake Shakeshaft is from Newcastle-under-Lyme in England. Shakeshaft has been playing guitar and singing since 2012 and in 2013 started to perform solo gigs. In August 2014, Shakeshaft was a finalist on NUA Entertainment Next Big Thing which was held at The Cavern, Liverpool. He reached the last 5 in the final. He studied Music Technology at Newcastle-under-Lyme College and worked part-time, however he had quit to concentrate on being a full-time musician.

In a February 2016 interview with Gay Times, Shakeshaft was asked about the inspiration behind the duo's Eurovision song and said, "The inspiration is the sentiment of togetherness – having support in times of need and being there for others."

== Discography ==
=== Singles ===
Title	Year	Peak chart positions			Album
Title	Year	UK	UK (DL)	SCO	Album
"You're Not Alone"	2016	81	31	31	Non-album singles
"Tongue Tied"	2017	–	—	—	Non-album singles
"—" denotes a single that did not chart or was not released.

Preceded by Electro Velvet with "Still in Love with You"	United Kingdom in the Eurovision Song Contest; 2016	Succeeded by Lucie Jones with "Never Give Up on You"
