= Muri & Mario =

Danish-Italian pop duo

- Origin: Copenhagen, Denmark
- Genres: Pop, Latin-influenced music
- Years active: 2009-present
- Labels: Vieni Qua; Warner Music
- Members: Muri (Murad Mahmoud); Mario (Mario Sciacca)

Muri & Mario, at times Muri og Mario is a Danish-Italian pop duo made up of Murad Mahmoud (Muri) and Mario Sciacca (Mario).

They formed the duo in 2009 putting out a number of Latin-inspired pop songs on their own Copenhagen-based label "Vieni Qua Music", an indie label with a Latin twist. Their songs often mixed bilingual Danish/Italian releases included "Mio amore" about spreading love through a canvas drawing project. It was followed by songs like "Tusind stykker" and "Cosa del amor", "På netdate fandt vi sammen" which found some following on YouTube.

It was however with "Hun tog min guitar" in 2011 that they gained big response becoming an online sensation. The song meaning "She took my guitar" in Danish was about an actual incident about Muri's ex-girlfriend who left taking away his guitar with her. She was bothered he spent more time with his guitar than with her. "She never gave the guitar back", said Muri in an interview. The big response online prompted them to release it in the summer of 2012 as their official debut single. They also organized a campaign where fans were asked to send them personal clips showing the fans performing parts of the song. More than a hundred fans responded and some appear in the music video. The song eventually made it to number one on the Hitlisten, the Danish Singles Chart where it stayed 2 weeks at the top. The song charted for 19 weeks in total including the charts including 8 weeks in Top 5. The official music video is made up of selections from more than 120 fans sending their own shots doing the already popular song. The follow-up single "Mambo" has also charted well reaching number 13 on the Hitlisten chart. They are working with producer Søren Mikkelsen for their next single "Amigo".

In 2016 they attended Melodi Grand Prix with song "To stjerner".

== Members ==
- Muri (real name Murad Mahmoud) is a Danish singer songwriter of Arab origin who grew up in Ølstykke before moving to Copenhagen. He started as a vocalist putting out various songs notably "D' Forbi" in 2007 featuring Camilla Lund and "Summer Makes Me Sing" in 2008. He took part in the group project Gazasangen contributing some verses for "Sænke Slagskib" about the 2009 Gaza War. He also co-wrote with Patrick Spiegelberg and Kasper Svenstrup the hit "Jeg er også en perle", a single for Perlekæden.
- Mario (full name Mario Sciacca), is an Italian/Danish singer and producer of Sicilian origin residing in Denmark. Before Muri & Mario he was signed with Balloon Records in Austria with his Italo/DANCE band Italian Rockaz

== Discography ==
Year	Single	Peak positions	Certification	Album
Year	Single	DK	Certification	Album
2012	"Hun tog min guitar"	1		Kærlighed & Kildevand
2013	"Mambo"	13		Kærlighed & Kildevand
2016	"To stjerner"	—		Melodi Grand Prix

Others

- 2009: "Mio Amore"
- 2011: "Tusind Stykker"
- 2011: "Cosa Del Amor"
- 2012: "På Netdate Fandt Vi Sammen"
- 2012: ″Hun Tog Min Guitar″
- 2013: ″Mambo″
- 2013: "Amigo"
- 2013: ″Venner Eller Fjender″
- 2016: ″To Stjerner″
- 2016: ″Storbypige″
