= Anja Nissen (album) =

Studio album by Anja Nissen
- Released: 1 August 2014
- Recorded: 2014
- Genres: Pop; adult contemporary
- Length: 47:45
- Labels: Mercury; Universal
- Producer: Eric J Dubowsky

Anja Nissen chronology
Anja Nissen (2014)	Where I Am (2017)

Singles from Anja Nissen
- 1. "I'll Be There" Released: 24 June 2014; 2. "Irreplaceable" Released: 1 July 2014; 3. "Wild" Released: 8 July 2014; 4. "I Have Nothing" Released: 15 July 2014

Anja Nissen is the self-titled debut album by Anja Nissen, the winner of the third series of The Voice Australia, released through Universal Music Australia on 1 August 2014. It consists of covers of songs performed on The Voice, as well as four new covers.

== Commercial performance ==
Anja Nissen debuted at number 11 on the ARIA Albums Chart with first week sales of 1,952 copies.

== Track listing ==
No.	Title	Writer(s)	Length
1.	"Vanishing"	Mariah Carey, Ben Marguiles	4:13
2.	"When Love Takes Over"	Miriam Nervo, Olivia Nervo, Kelly Rowland, David Guetta, Frédéric Riesterer	3:28
3.	"His Eye Is on the Sparrow"	Civilla D. Martin, Charles H. Gabriel	4:42
4.	"I'll Be There"	Berry Gordy, Bob West, Willie Hutch, Hal Davis	4:08
5.	"Irreplaceable"	Shaffer Smith, Beyoncé Knowles, Mikkel S. Eriksen, Tor Erik Hermansen, Espen Lind, Amund Bjørklund	3:50
6.	"Wild"	Jessica Cornish, Joshua Coleman, Claude Kelly, Dylan Mills, Sean Anderson	3:14
7.	"I Have Nothing"	David Foster, Linda Thompson	4:13
8.	"I Won't Give Up"	Jason Mraz, Michael Natter	4:04
9.	"Stop and Stare"	Ryan Tedder, Zach Filkins, Andrew Brown, Eddie Fisher, Tim Myers	3:44
10.	"Rather Be"	Jack Patterson, James Napier, Nicole Marshall	3:50
11.	"Free Fallin'"	Tom Petty, Jeff Lynne	4:01
Total length:			47:45

== Charts ==
Chart (2014)	Peak position
Australian Albums (ARIA)	11
Australian Artists Albums (ARIA)	6
