= Bea Munro =

- Born: Chelmsford, Essex, England
- Origin: London, England
- Genres: Rock, Soul, Pop
- Occupation: Singer / Songwriter
- Years active: 2014–present
- Website: http://www.beamunro.com

Bea Munro is an English, London-based, singer-songwriter.

Heavily inspired by Led Zeppelin and Jimi Hendrix, she attended the Grand Opening of Jimi Hendrix's London Home in February 2016. Bea was part of the UK's 2016 Eurovision jury team, headed by One Direction vocal coach CeCe Sammy. She is published by BMG Chrysalis, and her debut album The Other Side of Fear was produced by Greg Wells, and released in 2017.

== Early life ==
Bea Munro was born in Chelmsford, Essex.

== Notable concerts ==
- 1 June - London Bridge City Festival
- The Grand Opening of Jimi Hendrix's London Home, 2016

== Discography ==
The Other Side of Fear, 2017
