= You're Not Alone (Joe and Jake song) =

2016 song by Joe and Jake

Single by Joe and Jake

from the album Eurovision Song Contest 2016 Stockholm
- Released: 11 March 2016
- Recorded: 2015
- Genre: Pop
- Length: 2:50
- Label: Sony Music Entertainment
- Songwriter(s): Schwartz; Justin J. Benson; S. Kanes
- Producer(s): Matt Schwartz

Joe and Jake singles chronology
"You're Not Alone" (2016)	"Tongue Tied" (2017)

Music video
- "You're Not Alone" on YouTube

Eurovision Song Contest 2016 entry
- Country: United Kingdom
- Artist(s): Joe and Jake
- Language: English
- Composer(s): Schwartz; Justin J. Benson; S. Kanes
- Lyricist(s): Schwartz; Justin J. Benson; S. Kanes

Finals performance
- Final result: 24th
- Final points: 62

Entry chronology
- ◄ "Still in Love with You" (2015)
- "Never Give Up on You" (2017) ►

"You're Not Alone" is a song by British duo Joe and Jake. It represented the United Kingdom at the Eurovision Song Contest 2016 in Stockholm after being voted first out of six at Eurovision: You Decide on 26 February. This was the first time the public had decided the entrant since 2010. The song was released on 11 March 2016 as a digital download. It reached number 81 in the UK Charts on Friday 20 May, following the Eurovision Final.

The song was the bookmakers' 10th favourite after it was placed in the running order as next to last, straight after Austria's entry "Loin d'ici" (English: Far from here) by 19-year-old Zoë. The staging of the UK song featured selfies from fans.

The song picked up 12 points from Malta and 7 from Ireland finishing 17th after the jury vote. But it gained only 8 additional points in the public televote and finished in 24th place with 62 points.

== Reception ==
The song received generally positive reviews for its catchy modern pop style.

Following the duo's first rehearsal at the finals, bookmaker William Hill decreased their odds of winning from 50–1 to 25–1.

"Compared to the gimmicky, awkwardly choreographed production we saw from Electro Velvet last year, Joe and Jake are delivering a simple, confident stage show that puts the focus squarely on the song," John Paul Lucas of website ESC Insight said. "Vocally, the boys are sounding great, although they feel slightly disconnected from each other at the moment. They could benefit from making more eye contact with each other rather than standing side by side staring straight down the camera."

== Background ==
The duo consists of Joe Woolford from Ruthin, Wales and Jake Shakeshaft from Stoke-on-Trent, England. They met while participating in the fourth series of the talent show The Voice UK. Joe made it through to the live shows and Jake made it through to the knockout round. After the show ended, they formed the duo.

== Eurovision Song Contest ==
In February 2016, Joe and Jake were announced as one of the six participants of Eurovision: You Decide, the national final developed by the BBC to select the United Kingdom's entry for the Eurovision Song Contest 2016. The six competing songs were premièred in The Ken Bruce Show on BBC Radio 2 on 22 February 2016. The national final took place on 26 February at The O2 Forum venue in Kentish Town, London and was hosted by Mel Giedroyc. The show was broadcast live on BBC Four as well as streamed online via the BBC iPlayer and at the official Eurovision Song Contest website eurovision.tv. The duo won the show through a combination of televoting and online voting. They performed the song in the 2nd semi-final on 12 May and the final on 14 May at the Ericsson Globe in Stockholm, Sweden.

== Track listing ==
Digital download
No.	Title	Length
1.	"You're Not Alone"	2:50

Remixes
No.	Title	Length
1.	"You're Not Alone" (Cahill Club Mix)	6:00
2.	"You're Not Alone" (Cahill Club Edit)	3:10

== Chart performance ==
Chart (2016)	Peak position
Scotland (OCC)	31
Sweden Heatseekers (Sverigetopplistan)	12
UK Singles Downloads (OCC)	31
UK Singles (OCC)	81

== Release history ==
Region	Date	Format	Label
United Kingdom	11 March 2016	Digital download	Sony Music Entertainment
