= Electro Velvet =

British vocal duo

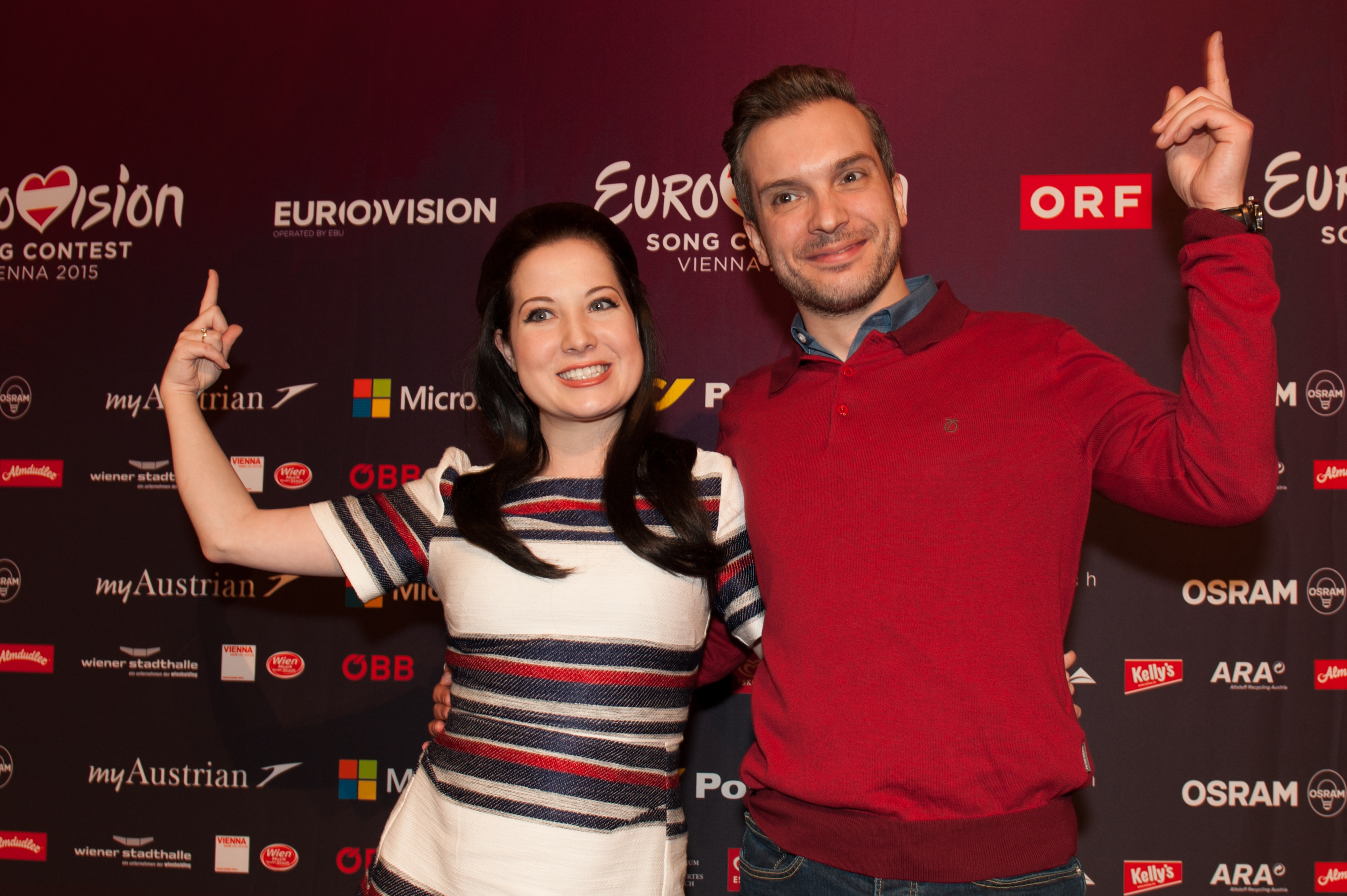
- Electro Velvet at Eurovision 2015

Background information
- Origin: United Kingdom
- Genres: Pop; electro swing
- Years active: 2014–2015, 2018
- Label: Band of Sisters Recordings
- Past members: Alex Larke; Bianca Nicholas

Electro Velvet were a British vocal duo that represented the United Kingdom in the Eurovision Song Contest 2015 with the song "Still in Love with You" finishing 24th. The duo consist of Alex Larke and Bianca Nicholas.

== Career ==
=== Early beginnings ===
Nicholas has appeared both on The X Factor and The Voice UK. She has also sung a duet with Will Young and performed in front of Prince William, Catherine, Duchess of Cambridge, and Prince Harry. In 2011, Nicholas released a single "Hold on To Your Dreams", which entered the UK Top 100 singles chart. She also had a small role in the 1999 American film Sleepy Hollow with Johnny Depp. She has cystic fibrosis.

Born in Welwyn Garden City, Larke is currently lead singer for The Rolling Stones tribute group The Rolling Clones, and has toured the UK and internationally with the band. He has recently worked with Big Beat pioneer Cut La Roc on his album Larger Than Life, which also features Ice-T collaborator, Donald D and Snow Patrol frontman Gary Lightbody. Larke works part-time in a primary school, and also teaches ukulele and recorder. In 2014 he worked in a special needs school with children and young adults with profound to severe learning difficulties.

On their official Facebook page, the duo thanked their fans for all their support during their time at Eurovision, as well as announcing "we'll be in touch soon about what we are up to next."

=== 2015: Eurovision Song Contest ===
Electro Velvet were selected by the BBC to represent the United Kingdom in the Eurovision Song Contest 2015 with their song "Still in Love with You". The entry was presented on 7 March 2015 via the BBC Red Button service. The song received a mixed to negative reception upon its announcement. In the Eurovision final they received 5 points and were placed 24th out of 27.

The staging of the song included two pairs of additional dancers, two of whom performed breakdance and acrobatic moves. The television production involved some Busby Berkeley-style shots from above and darkened sequences during which the performers' costumes were illuminated with integral LED strip light.

On 22 June, their debut EP was launched on PledgeMusic where it was available to pre-order, along with many other exclusives. It was cancelled due to Nicholas' continued ill-health.

== Discography ==
=== Singles ===
Title	Year	Peak chart position				Album
Title	Year	UK	UK Indie	UK Indie Breakers	AUT	Album
"Still in Love with You"	2015	114	8	2	53	Non-album single
"Take Me Home"	2018	—	—	—	—	Non-album single
"—" denotes a single that did not chart or was not released.

Preceded by Molly Smitten-Downes with "Children of the Universe"	United Kingdom in the Eurovision Song Contest; 2015	Succeeded by Joe and Jake with "You're Not Alone"
