= Anja Nissen =

Australian pop singer (born 1995)

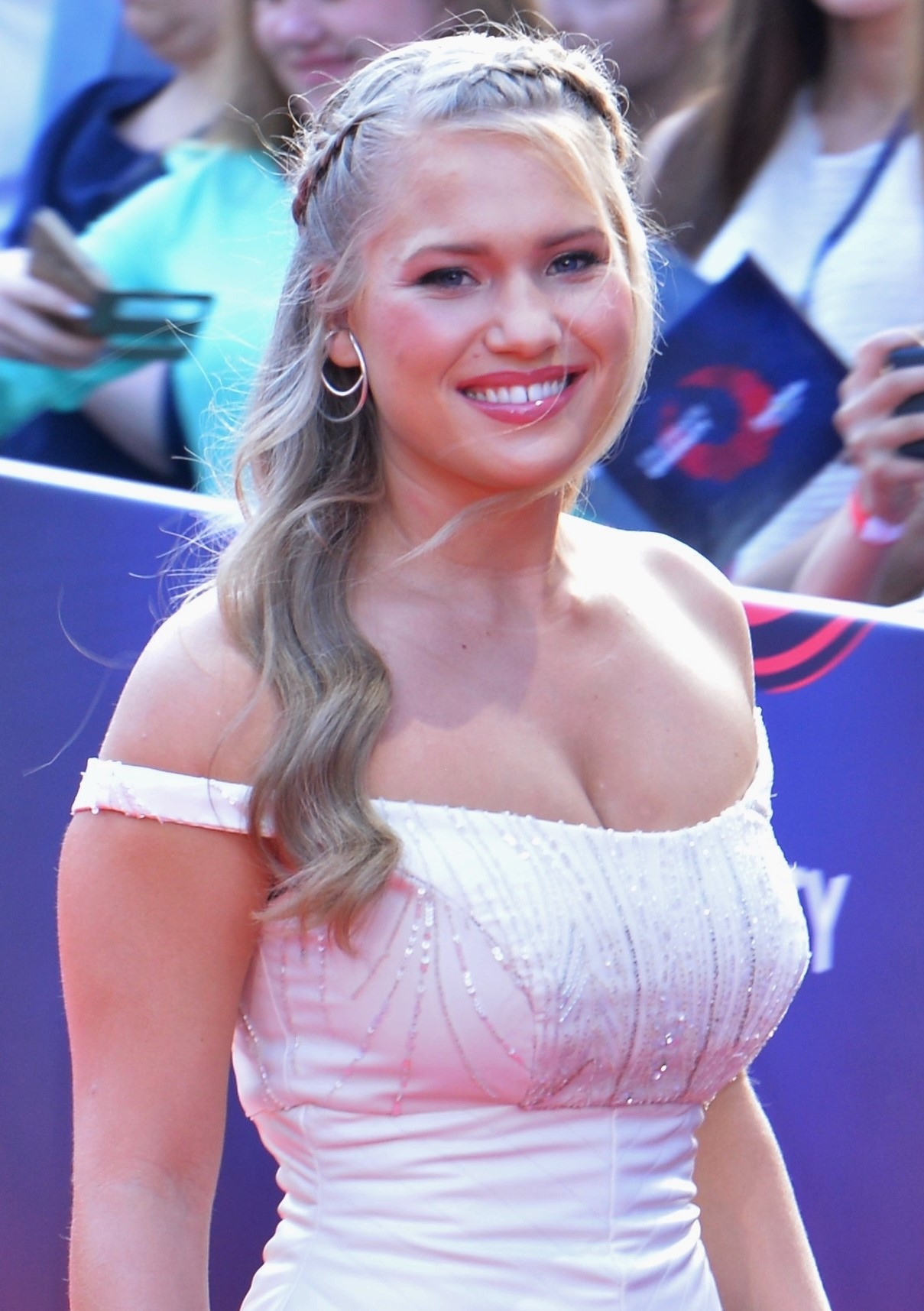
- Nissen on the red carpet of the Eurovision Song Contest 2017

Background information
- Born: 6 November 1995 (age 31); Winmalee, New South Wales, Australia
- Genres: Pop; R&B
- Occupation: Singer
- Years active: 2002–present
- Label: Anja Nissen Music
- Website: anjanissenmusic.com

Anja Nissen (born 6 November 1995), sometimes known as simply Anja, is a Danish-Australian singer. She was the winner of the third season of The Voice Australia. Following her win, Nissen was signed to Universal Music Group and lists her influences as Celine Dion, Mariah Carey, Whitney Houston, Christina Aguilera, Toni Braxton and Stevie Wonder.

In 2016, Nissen competed in Dansk Melodi Grand Prix 2016, Denmark's national final for the Eurovision Song Contest, performing the song "Never Alone". She came in second place with 36% of the vote. In 2017, Nissen competed in Dansk Melodi Grand Prix 2017 with the song "Where I Am", which she co-wrote. Anja went on to win and represented Denmark in the Eurovision Song Contest 2017, where she finished 20th in the final.

Nissen has been an Australia Day ambassador, and performed at the Australia Day Event in Northern Territory. Nissen performed at the 2014 Carols by Candlelight in Melbourne, Australia. Nissen was also the face of Lyla & Co.

== Life and career ==
=== Early life ===
Nissen was raised in Winmalee, The Blue Mountains, New South Wales, Australia to Danish-born parents. Her mother and father emigrated from Denmark to Australia when they were 11 and 22 years old, respectively. Nissen grew up on her parents' country property in the Lower Blue Mountains with her older sister. She attended Winmalee High School, where she obtained her HSC in 2013. Throughout high school Anja was part of the exclusive Talent Development Program (TDP) and competed in a number of singing competitions.

In 2008, Nissen made it to the semi-finals of Season 2 of popular talent-search TV show, Australia's Got Talent, aged 12. Since then she has appeared on a number of TV shows, including Young Talent Time, Mornings with Kerri-Anne and the annual Schools Spectacular. She also performed the Danish National Anthem in the company of Crown Princess Mary of Denmark.

=== 2014–2016: The Voice Australia ===
In 2014, Nissen was a contestant on the third series of The Voice Australia. She was a member of Team will.i.am, and went on to win the competition.

denotes winner.

The Voice performances and results (2014)
Episode	Song	Original Artist	Result
Audition	"Vanishing"	Mariah Carey	Through to Battle rounds
Battle Rounds	"When Love Takes Over"	David Guetta ft. Kelly Rowland	Through to Showdowns
Showdowns	"His Eye Is on the Sparrow"	Lauryn Hill	Through to live shows
Live show 1	"I'll Be There"	The Jackson 5	Bottom two
Live show 2	"Irreplaceable"	Beyoncé	Instant Saved
Live show 3	"Wild"	Jessie J	Instant Saved
Live show 4	"I Have Nothing"	Whitney Houston	Not saved / Wild Card
Live show 5	"Somebody That I Used to Know" with ZK	Gotye and Kimbra	Group Performances / Saved
Grand Final	"Where Is the Love?" with Will.i.am	The Black Eyed Peas	Duet
Grand Final	"When Love Takes Over"	David Guetta ft. Kelly Rowland	Winner

Immediately following her win on The Voice, Nissen was due to release the track titled "My Girls", co-written by Delta Goodrem, was cancelled at the last minute. Nissen said, "'My Girls' is an awesome song, a great song, it just came down to whether or not it's my style or not... Will wanted to be part of the decision making process when it came to choosing the single. Will wasn’t sure if 'My Girls' was the right style for me. He wanted to have a few more days to think about that and start working on ideas, looking at where to go next."

Nissen's debut self-titled album consisted of songs from The Voice. It was not promoted by a radio single at the time, which impacted sales.

In October 2014, Nissen released a collaboration with will.i.am and Cody Wise titled "I'm So Excited" as her debut single. The song debuted at number 42 on the ARIA Singles Chart, selling 3,023 copies and received a mixed response.

Anja featured on We Love Disney (2014) album singing "A Dream is a Wish Your Heart Makes" from Cinderella. Her rendition of "Joy to the World" was released on The Salvation Army's Spirit of Christmas 2014 album.

On 19 May 2015, Nissen released her follow-up single of Bacharach and David's "Anyone Who Had a Heart" as a part of Nine Network's hit television program Love Child. On 4 August 2015, Nissen released her third single "Triumph". She performed her single on The Voice Australia 2015 to over 1.6 million viewers nationwide.

=== 2016–2018: Denmark in the Eurovision Song Contest ===
On 10 January 2016, Nissen was confirmed to be taking part in the Dansk Melodi Grand Prix 2016, Denmark's national selection for the Eurovision Song Contest 2016, with the song "Never Alone". The song was written by Danish Eurovision winner Emmelie de Forest, producer Rune Westberg, and American singer and songwriter MoZella. She ended up placing second in the final with 36% of the final vote, behind winners Lighthouse X. The following year, she returned to the Dansk Melodi Grand Prix with the song "Where I Am", which was written by Nissen herself, along with Angel Tupai and Michael D'Arcy. Nissen went on to win, getting 64% of the final vote, and represented Denmark in the Eurovision Song Contest 2017. In May, Nissen released a 6-track EP titled Where I Am. As of 2017, Nissen is living in Los Angeles, where she is studying Keyboard Technology and Music Theory at Musicians Institute (Hollywood).

=== 2019–present: Songwriting and Same Room EP ===
Across the COVID years, Nissen lived between Copenhagen and Los Angeles.

In 2020, Nissen relocated to California and released two singles—"If We Only Had Tonight" and "Can't Do This".

In February 2023, Nissen released the six-track EP titled Same Room.

== Discography ==
- Anja Nissen (2014)

== Awards ==
=== Mo Awards ===
The Australian Entertainment Mo Awards (commonly known informally as the Mo Awards), were annual Australian entertainment industry awards. They recognise achievements in live entertainment in Australia from 1975 to 2016. Anja Nissen won one awards in that time.

Year	Nominee / work	Award	Result (wins only)
2013	Anja Nissen	Johnny O'Keefe Encouragement Award	Won

Awards and achievements
Preceded by Harrison Craig	The Voice (Australia) winner 2014	Succeeded by Ellie Drennan
Preceded by Lighthouse X with "Soldiers of Love"	Denmark in the Eurovision Song Contest; 2017	Succeeded by Rasmussen with "Higher Ground"
