= Where I Am (EP) =

EP by Anja Nissen
- Released: 5 May 2017
- Genre: Pop
- Label: Mercury
- Producer: MSquared Productions

Anja Nissen chronology
Anja Nissen (2014)	Where I Am (2017)

Singles from Where I Am
- 1. "Where I Am" Released: 28 February 2017

Where I Am is the debut extended play by Danish-Australian singer Anja Nissen. It was released on 5 May 2017.

In an interview with Good Evening Europe, Nissen explained the EP has songs that mean a lot to her "with personal feelings attached to them and they are uplifting and feel good". She said, "All songs I've written... I have so much more music to give and so much more music to share. I'm sure all the Eurovision fans are going to love it."

== Reception ==
Jovana Radojevic of Wiwibloggs reviewed the EP complementing Anja's vocal gymnastics, her power and range. She likened tracks to those of Girls Aloud, Rachel Stevens and Christina Aguilera. She complemented the "electrorock-influenced "Before You Were Cool"" and noted it as "one of the highlights of the EP."

== Track listing ==
Digital download
No.	Title	Writer(s)	Length
1.	"Drive"	Anja Nissen; Brittany Marie Amaradio; Brian Kierulf	3:17
2.	"Anything You Want"	Nissen; Michael Charles Paynter; Michael James Delorenzis	3:34
3.	"Where I Am"	Nissen; Angel Tupai; Michael D'Arcy	2:59
4.	"Tears Ago"	Nissen; Antonio Dixon; Khristopher Riddick-Tynes; H. "Carmen Reece" Culver; Jonathan Percy Starker Saxe	3:08
5.	"Before You Were Cool"	Nissen; Paynter; Delorenzis	3:41
6.	"Empire"	Nissen; Paynter; Delorenzis	3:09

== Release history ==
Region	Date	Format	Label	Ref.
Worldwide	5 May 2017	Digital download	Mercury Records	
