= Molly Smitten-Downes =

British singer (born 1985)

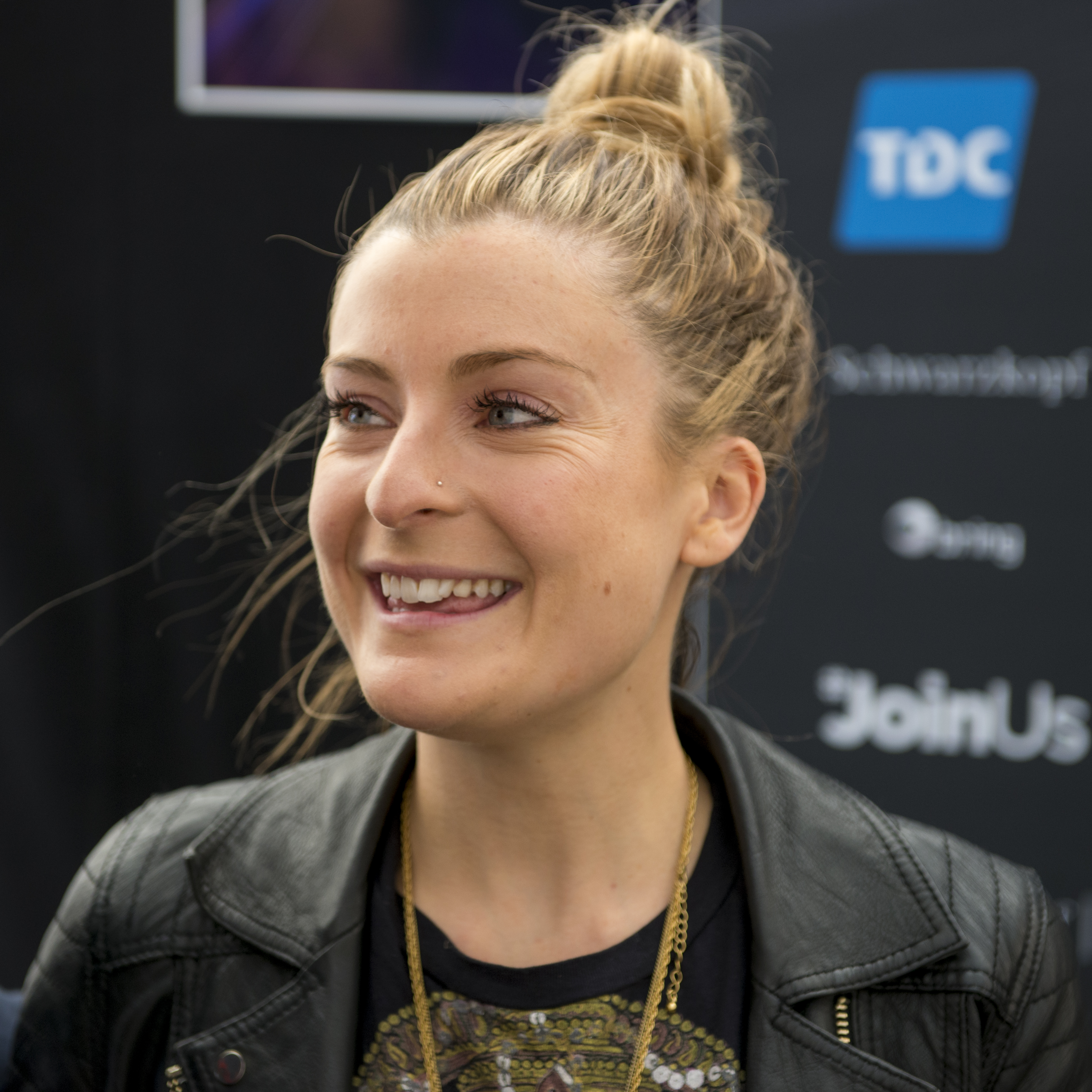
- Molly Smitten-Downes (2014)

Background information
- Born: Molly Alice Smitten-Downes; 2 April 1985 (age 41); Anstey, Leicestershire, England
- Genres: Folk, pop
- Occupations: Singer, songwriter
- Years active: 2005–present
- Labels: East West Records; Warner Music UK
- Website: officialmolly.com

Molly Alice Smitten-Downes (born 2 April 1985), known by her mononym Molly, is an English singer and songwriter.

== Early life ==
Born in Anstey, Leicestershire, Molly grew up in Rothley and attended Our Lady's Convent School (later known as Loughborough Amherst School) in Loughborough. She began starring in stage productions from the age of eight. She studied music at Leicester College and at the Academy of Contemporary Music in Guildford, Surrey.

== Career ==
=== 2005–10: Stunt ===
Molly was a member of the British dance music project Stunt, who achieved chart success in 2008 with their collaboration mashup track "Raindrops (Encore une fois)" with Sash!, combining songs "Raindrops" (2006) and "Encore une fois" (1997). In 2009, Smitten-Downes teamed with Swedish producer and singer/songwriter Basshunter, for the collaboration "I Will Learn to Love Again", which is featured on his second UK album Bass Generation.

=== 2011–13: Career beginnings ===
An acoustic EP Fly Away with Me was released on 18 December 2011. EP track "Shadows" was sampled by grime artist Marger and has been released on iTunes through 360 Records (21 August 2011). "Beneath The Lights", her collaboration with Swedish producer Anders Hansson, was released in April 2013 with Anders' project Dream Beats. "Never Forget", her collaboration with producer Darren Styles, was written and recorded in 2012.

=== 2014: Eurovision Song Contest ===
Molly presenting herself and Children of the Universe at the Eurovision Song Contest 2014

After being supported and later put forward by BBC Introducing, Molly was approached by Guy Freeman, the executive producer and head of delegation of Eurovision for the BBC and asked if she would like to compose an entry for that year's contest. After initially saying 'I'm so flattered, but it's not for me’ on the grounds that it was not 'suitable' to her creatively, eventually Smitten-Downes was convinced by the prospect of being able to perform a self-penned work on a global stage.

On 3 March 2014, the BBC announced that Molly would be representing the United Kingdom in the Eurovision Song Contest 2014 with the song "Children of the Universe". Molly wrote "Children of the Universe" herself and has described her ambition to write music that "breaks down political barriers". Prior to the contest, Molly signed a record deal with Warner Music UK on 1 April 2014. On 4 April, Molly announced that she would release her song "Children of the Universe" on 28 April 2014. It was made available for digital download on iTunes from 15 April. The song was recorded in Stockholm, Sweden with a 28-piece orchestra and produced by Anders Hansson. The official video for the entry was released on YouTube on 23 April 2014. The following day, Molly appeared on BBC Radio 1's Innuendo Bingo. However at the Eurovision final on 10 May 2014, she was regarded as a front-runner and one of the favourites to win the show. Molly concluded the show performing last and the song was voted 17th (out of 26 entries) gaining 40 points.

=== 2014–15: After Eurovision ===
On 5 June it was revealed that Molly would perform at the Glastonbury Festival on 27 June 2014.

In 2015 she teamed up with German DJ and producer Zwette to make "Rush" which was released by Spinnin' Records and remixed by Sam Feldt. In September 2015, Molly performed "Rush" with Sam Feldt at V Festival in Chelmsford. Kanye West's producer Hudson Mohawke sampled a remix of "Beneath the Lights" for "Shadows" from his album Lantern.

== Honours and awards ==
Molly was awarded in 2012 the Best Urban/Pop Act at Live and Unsigned and in 2013 won Best Song at the Best of British Unsigned Music Awards. On 1 November 2014, she received an honorary award for her musical achievements at Leicester College where she completed a performing musician course in 2002.

== Discography ==
=== Extended plays ===
| Title | Album details |
|---|---|
| Fly Away with Me | Released: 18 December 2011; Label: Independent; Format: Digital download |

=== Singles ===
==== As lead artist ====
| Title | Year | Peak chart positions | | | | | | | | Album |
| Title | Year | UK | AUT | BEL | DEN | GER | IRE | SCO | SWI | Album |
|---|---|---|---|---|---|---|---|---|---|---|
| "Beneath the Lights" (with Dream Beats) | 2013 | – | — | — | — | — | — | — | — | Non-album singles |
| "Children of the Universe"^{[a]} | 2014 | 23 | 63 | 139 | 37 | 94 | 36 | 15 | 63 | Non-album singles |
| "Lock Up Your Daughter"^{[b]} | 2014 | – | – | – | – | – | – | – | – | Non-album singles |
"—" denotes a single that did not chart or was not released.

==== As featured artist ====
| Title | Year | Album |
|---|---|---|
| "Shadows" (Marger featuring Molly) | 2011 | Non-album singles |
| "Never Forget You" (Darren Styles featuring Molly) | 2013 | Non-album singles |
| "Rush" (Zwette featuring Molly) | 2015 | Non-album singles |
| "Breathe" (Si Tew featuring Molly) | 2015 | Non-album singles |

| Preceded by Bonnie Tyler with "Believe in Me" | UK in the Eurovision Song Contest; 2014 | Succeeded by Electro Velvet with "Still in Love with You" |
