= Children of the Universe =

2014 song by Molly Smitten-Downes

Single by Molly

from the album Eurovision Song Contest: Copenhagen 2014
- Released: 15 April 2014 (digital release); 28 April 2014 (physical release)
- Recorded: 2014
- Genre: Indie pop, alternative rock
- Length: 3:00
- Label: East West Records
- Songwriters: Molly Smitten-Downes, Anders Hansson
- Producer: Anders Hansson

Molly singles chronology
"Never Forget You" (2013)	"Children of the Universe" (2014)	"Lock Up Your Daughter" (2014)

Music video
- "Children of the Universe" on YouTube

Eurovision Song Contest 2014 entry
- Country: United Kingdom
- Artist: Molly
- Language: English
- Composers: Molly Smitten-Downes; Anders Hansson
- Lyricists: Molly Smitten-Downes; Anders Hansson

Finals performance
- Final result: 17th
- Final points: 40

Entry chronology
- ◄ "Believe in Me" (2013)
- "Still in Love with You" (2015) ►

Song presentation
- file; help

Official performance video
- "Children of the Universe" (Final) on YouTube

"Children of the Universe" is a song by British singer Molly Smitten-Downes. It was chosen by the British Broadcasting Corporation (BBC) to represent the United Kingdom at the Eurovision Song Contest 2014 in Denmark. The song was co-written by Smitten-Downes. An indie pop and alternative rock song, it became one of the favourites to win the contest. "Children of the Universe" finished in 17th place with 40 points and gave the UK its best placing since Blue came 11th place in the 2011 Contest. The song reached number twenty three on the UK Singles Chart and charted in Austria, Denmark, Germany, Ireland, Sweden, and Switzerland.

== Background and release ==
Smitten-Downes was discovered for her work on BBC Introducing and was invited to compose a song especially for the 59th edition of the Eurovision Song Contest. The song has been described as a powerful, contemporary, anthemic and uplifting track specifically written with live performance in mind. Talking to the BBC she said, "I'm so excited for everyone to hear 'Children of The Universe'. I'm so happy with it. To represent the United Kingdom in such a huge competition, not only as a singer and performer but as a songwriter is an unbelievable honour. I hope I can do us proud". The song was inspired by Max Ehrmann's poem, Desiderata.

It received airplay from the UK national radio station BBC Radio 2 on their 'A' list during April and May 2014. The song was released on 28 April 2014 through East West Records, a division of Warner Music Group and was made available for digital download on iTunes from 15 April. The digital release of the single will come packaged with an extended version and remix from Secaina Hudson. A remixed version by Scott Mills was uploaded via the BBC Eurovision website on 10 April.

The music video for the song was released via Molly's YouTube channel on 23 April 2014 and has a run time of three minutes exactly.

== Composition ==
"Children of the Universe" was written by Molly, as opposed to using a pre-written song, this was the first such song from the United Kingdom since their 1997 victory with Katrina and the Waves in an attempt to perform well: the tactic was described as a "cunning plan". She stated that she was not short of ideas, she said that she "came up with six or seven ideas in the space of 48 hours and this one just stood out". Although Molly wrote the lyrics and the "top line", her Swede producer Anders Hansson wrote music for strings (on the musical release there was a 26-piece big string orchestra), after agreeing with her choice of song from the drafts.

== Critical reception ==
Professional ratings
Review scores
Source	Rating
Daily Mirror	4/5 stars
Digital Spy	3.5/5 stars

The song has received generally positive reviews from critics.

The Daily Mirror said: "Molly's voice has such a powerful tone to it – combined with the thumping beat, it makes you want to sing along – even if you don't know the lyrics. Overall it's the best thing we've produced since Gina G's 'Ooh Ahh... Just a Little Bit' [sic] which is a very good thing."

Whilst website Digital Spy said: "Gone are seasoned balladeers and cheesy irrelevant pop, and in comes a timely anthem flanked by marching beats and rousing strings. "And this is a madness / I'm not giving in," Molly asserts, before she launches into a swaying chorus fit for a stadium. There's no denying that the earworm chant of "power to the people" will strike a chord with certain troubled parts of the continent, but the track can stand on its own merit of being one of the best entries we've put forward in years. Will it get Britain interested in Eurovision again? That's a big ask. But at least we're finally sending a song that stands a real chance of winning."

== Performances and promotion ==
She performed the song live on 2 March 2014 for the first time at a secret location for the artist and song presentation for the Eurovision Song Contest 2014. The performance was first broadcast via the BBC Red Button on 3 March 2014.

Molly performed her entry at the Eurovision in Concert event on 5 April in Amsterdam alongside 24 other participating acts and headlined the London Eurovision Party preview show on 13 April at London's Café de Paris. Molly was later interviewed on television and radio shows in Malta as part of her promotional tour. She participated in a game of Innuendo Bingo on 23 April 2014 on the Scott Mills show on BBC Radio 1, followed by an appearance on The One Show on 28 April 2014. On 2 May 2014, she performed the song on The Graham Norton Show. The performance was pre-recorded on 1 April.

== Eurovision Song Contest 2014 ==
Molly was selected by the BBC to represent the United Kingdom in the Eurovision Song Contest 2014. The first rehearsal took place on 4 May, the second on 6 May and the performance in front of the jury on 9 May 2014. Appearing as the last of 26 acts, Molly performed "Children of the Universe" live on 10 May 2014 during the final of the Eurovision Song Contest 2014 at the B&W Hallerne, in Copenhagen, Denmark. On stage, Molly was joined by drummer Joe Yoshida and four backing vocalists: Lincoln Jean-Marie, Katie Holmes, Victoria Beaumont, and Sharleen Linton. The British performance featured Molly performing in front of a stage set-up that included the drummer in the centre with two backing vocalists on each side. The LED screens projected floral patterns and Chinese lanterns. The song finished in 17th place with a total of 40 points.

== Track listings ==
Digital download

1. "Children of the Universe" – 3:00

Remixes – Single

1. "Children of the Universe" (Scott Mills Club Mix) – 6:07
2. "Children of the Universe" (Scott Mills Radio Mix) – 3:28
3. "Children of the Universe" (Secaina Hudson Remix) – 3:13

== Release history ==
Region	Date	Format	Label
United Kingdom	15 April 2014	Digital download	East West Records
United Kingdom	28 April 2014	CD single	East West Records

== Chart performance ==
=== Weekly charts ===
Chart (2014)	Peak position
Austria (Ö3 Austria Top 40)	63
Belgium (Ultratip Bubbling Under Flanders)	89
Denmark (Tracklisten)	37
Germany (GfK)	94
Ireland (IRMA)	36
Scotland Singles (OCC)	15
Sweden (Sverigetopplistan)	31
Switzerland (Schweizer Hitparade)	63
UK Singles (OCC)	23

== Awards ==
=== Eurovision Song Contest Radio Awards 2014 ===
Eurovision Song Contest Radio is a website that host an international voting poll each year for various awards. Molly was nominated for Best Song (received 4.7% of the vote) and Best Female Artist (9.9% of the vote) coming 8th and 5th respectively.

Year	Nominated work	Award	Result
2014	"Children of the Universe"	Best Song	Nominated
2014	Herself	Best Female Artist	Nominated
