= Still in Love with You (Electro Velvet song) =

2015 song by Electro Velvet

Single by Electro Velvet
- Released: 30 March 2015
- Recorded: 2015
- Genre: Electro swing
- Length: 2:53
- Label: Right Track
- Songwriter(s): David Mindel; Adrian Bax White

Music video
- "Still in Love with You" on YouTube

Eurovision Song Contest 2015 entry
- Country: United Kingdom
- Artist(s): Electro Velvet
- Language: English
- Lyricist(s): David Mindel; Adrian Bax White

Finals performance
- Final result: 24th
- Final points: 5

Entry chronology
- ◄ "Children of the Universe" (2014)
- "You're Not Alone" (2016) ►

"Still in Love with You" is a song by British vocal duo Electro Velvet. It was chosen internally by the BBC to represent the United Kingdom at the Eurovision Song Contest 2015 in Austria. The song was written by David Mindel and Adrian Bax White.

It was a minor UK hit, reaching number 114, one of the lowest charting UK Eurovision entries.

The song is strongly influenced by 1920s swing music, with a modern twist, with the official music video in keeping with the costume and dance of the era. The central section features Larke performing scat singing. The style of the track has been compared to Caro Emerald, as well as to the music for a 1980s television commercial for Birds Eye potato waffles. In the final, the song received 5 points, placing it 24th out 27.

== Reception ==
It received mixed reviews from critics. Whilst some thought its "electro swing" sound might help it stand out, others criticised the song, and overall performance on the night was seen as weaker in terms of vocals and stage production compared with the actual single.

The Guardian called the track "nightmarish", while The Independent branded it "instantly forgettable". But singer Alex Larke told the BBC: "I like the fact it divides opinion. It's better than everyone having apathy for it." Bianca Nicholas, who shares the vocals, added: "There's a lot of ballads this year, so our song will stand out." Larke described it as a "Marmite song", while Nicholas pointed out that "a party song" was "really fitting" as Eurovision celebrates its 60th anniversary.

Former Strictly judge Arlene Phillips – who has choreographed previous UK Eurovision entries – wrote on Twitter: "It was a bit of a balls up." Member of Parliament Diane Abbott said on Twitter: “Is it me? Or was Electro Velvet truly awful?!”. Other tweeters joked the EU would want a referendum on kicking the UK out after our performance.

Others backed the duo. Presenter Colin Murray said: “The #GBR entry can hold its head up high. I wasn’t sick in my mouth once. It won’t win but hats off. Good effort.” There were worries the singers’ state of the art costumes, which lit up with hundreds of tiny LEDs in time to the music, wouldn't work properly after mishaps in rehearsals but they went off without a problem."

== Eurovision Song Contest 2015 ==
Electro Velvet and their entry, "Still in Love with You", were selected by the BBC to represent the United Kingdom in the Eurovision Song Contest 2015 by an internal panel of judges. The entry was presented on 7 March 2015 via the BBC Red Button service.

== Charts ==
Chart (2015)	Peak position
Austria (Ö3 Austria Top 40)	53
UK (UK Single Downloads Chart)	63
UK (OCC)	114
