= Wakeley =

Wakeley may refer to:

- Wakeley, Hertfordshire, a hamlet in England
- Wakeley (name)
- Wakeley, New South Wales, suburb of Sydney, Australia
- Wakeley baronets, British baronetcy

== See also ==
- 2024 Wakeley church stabbing
- Wakely (surname)
