= United Kingdom in the Eurovision Song Contest =

- Eurovision Song Contest
- Participating broadcaster: British Broadcasting Corporation (BBC)

Participation summary
- Appearances: 68
- First appearance: 1957
- Highest placement: 1st: 1967, 1969, 1976, 1981, 1997
- Host: 1960, 1963, 1968, 1972, 1974, 1977, 1982, 1998, 2023
- Participation history: 1957; 1958; 1959; 1960; 1961; 1962; 1963; 1964; 1965; 1966; 1967; 1968; 1969; 1970; 1971; 1972; 1973; 1974; 1975; 1976; 1977; 1978; 1979; 1980; 1981; 1982; 1983; 1984; 1985; 1986; 1987; 1988; 1989; 1990; 1991; 1992; 1993; 1994; 1995; 1996; 1997; 1998; 1999; 2000; 2001; 2002; 2003; 2004; 2005; 2006; 2007; 2008; 2009; 2010; 2011; 2012; 2013; 2014; 2015; 2016; 2017; 2018; 2019; ~~2020~~; 2021; 2022; 2023; 2024; 2025; 2026

Related articles
- UK national selection for the Eurovision Song Contest

External links
- BBC page
- United Kingdom's page at Eurovision.com
- For the most recent participation see United Kingdom in the Eurovision Song Contest 2026

The United Kingdom has been represented at the Eurovision Song Contest 68 times. Its first participation was at the second contest, in 1957, and it has entered every year since 1959. The British participating broadcaster in the contest is the British Broadcasting Corporation (BBC). The country has won the contest five times: in 1967, with "Puppet on a String" performed by Sandie Shaw; in 1969 (a four-way tie), with "Boom Bang-a-Bang" by Lulu; in 1976, with "Save Your Kisses for Me" by Brotherhood of Man; in 1981, with "Making Your Mind Up" by Bucks Fizz; and in 1997, with "Love Shine a Light" by Katrina and the Waves. The UK has also achieved a record sixteen second-place finishes, the first in 1959 and the most recent in 2022.

The United Kingdom is one of the "Big Four" countries, alongside France, Germany, Italy which have an automatic place in the final of the contest each year, due to their participating broadcasters being the largest financial contributors to the European Broadcasting Union (EBU). The BBC has allowed the public to choose the British entry in the contest through a national selection process on many occasions. The BBC has hosted the contest a record nine times. London was the host city in 1960, 1963, 1968, and 1977, Edinburgh in 1972, Brighton in 1974, Harrogate in 1982, Birmingham in 1998, and Liverpool in 2023.

The United Kingdom had a strong record in the contest before 2000, finishing within the top ten every year except 1978, 1987, and 1999. The country's record has been considerably poorer since 2000, as it has only reached the top ten three times and finished in last place six times (in 2003, 2008, 2010, 2019, 2021 and 2026), scoring no points in 2003 and 2021. Its top ten positions during this period are third in 2002 with "Come Back" by Jessica Garlick, fifth in 2009 with "It's My Time" by Jade Ewen, and second in 2022 with "Space Man" by Sam Ryder.

== Participation ==
The British Broadcasting Corporation (BBC) is a full member of the European Broadcasting Union (EBU), thus eligible to participate in the Eurovision Song Contest. It has participated in the contest representing the United Kingdom since its second edition in 1957 and its fourth edition in 1959.

== History ==
=== 1950s to 1970s ===
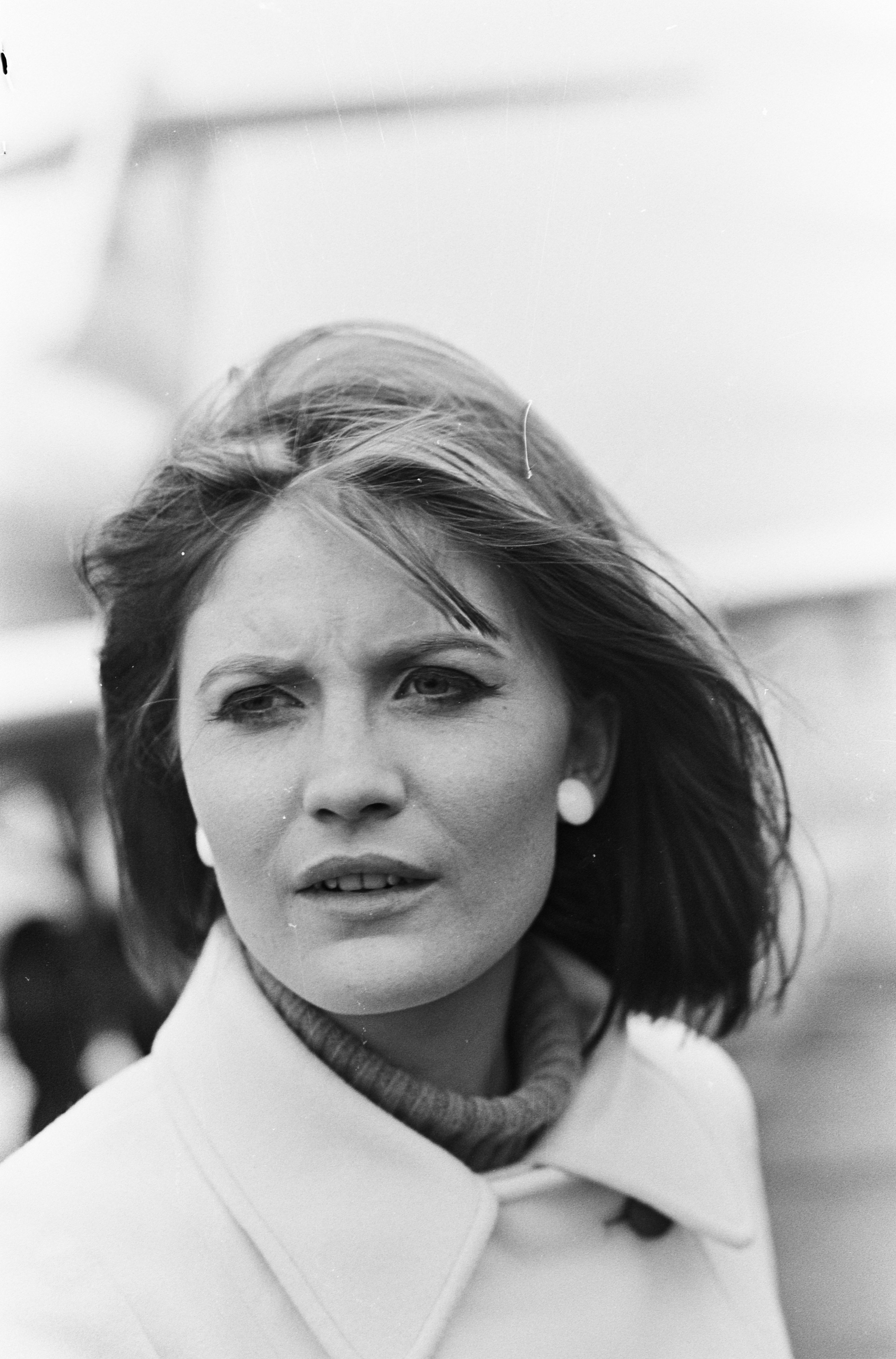
Sandie Shaw became the first British entrant to win the contest in 1967 with her song "Puppet on a String".

It was alleged that the United Kingdom was expected to take part in the first contest in 1956, and that it missed the submission deadline and therefore could not take part. This was later revealed by the EBU in January 2017 to be a myth created by fans of the contest. The EBU further went on to explain that the Festival of British Popular Songs, a contest created by the BBC for the United Kingdom, was the inspiration that brought in format changes to the contest elements from 1957 onwards. However, it's also believed that the United Kingdom had selected Shirley Abicair to perform "Little Ship" at the contest, but withdrew due to her nationality being Australian. Patricia Bredin was the first performer to represent the UK at Eurovision, finishing seventh in 1957. The UK was the first choice to stage the third contest in 1958, however following a failure to reach an agreement from various artistic unions, the BBC withdrew its bid in the summer of 1957 and the UK did not enter for the second and last time to date.

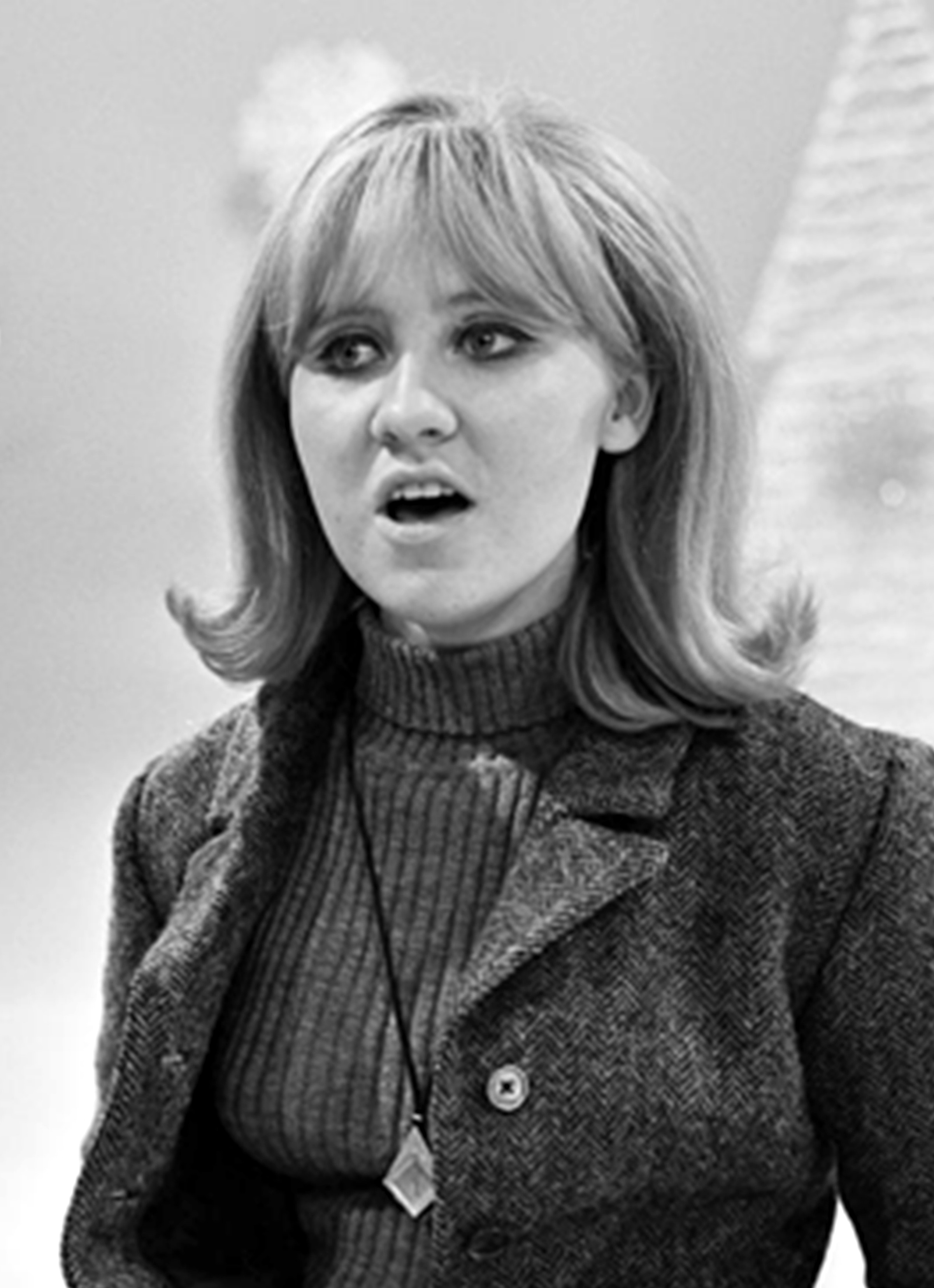
Lulu became the second British act to win the contest in 1969 with "Boom Bang-a-Bang".

At their second attempt in the contest in 1959, the UK achieved the first of its record sixteen runner-up positions, when Pearl Carr and Teddy Johnson sang "Sing Little Birdie". The UK would go on to achieve four more second-place finishes with Bryan Johnson in 1960, The Allisons in 1961, Matt Monro in 1964 and Kathy Kirby in 1965, before eventually winning for the first time in 1967. Sandie Shaw was already a successful performer, having twice topped the UK Singles Chart, and she comfortably won in Vienna with "Puppet on a String", which became her third UK number one and topped the charts all around Europe. In 1968, another successful performer was selected to represent the UK with the song "Congratulations". In London, Cliff Richard gave the UK its sixth second-place finish, losing to Spain's Massiel. "Congratulations" remains one of only two non-winning UK Eurovision entries to top the UK charts. The UK's second victory was provided by the Scottish singer Lulu, who won with the song "Boom Bang-a-Bang" in 1969, in a four-way tie with France, Spain and the Netherlands. Another established performer, she had previously topped the US Billboard Hot 100 with "To Sir with Love" in 1967.

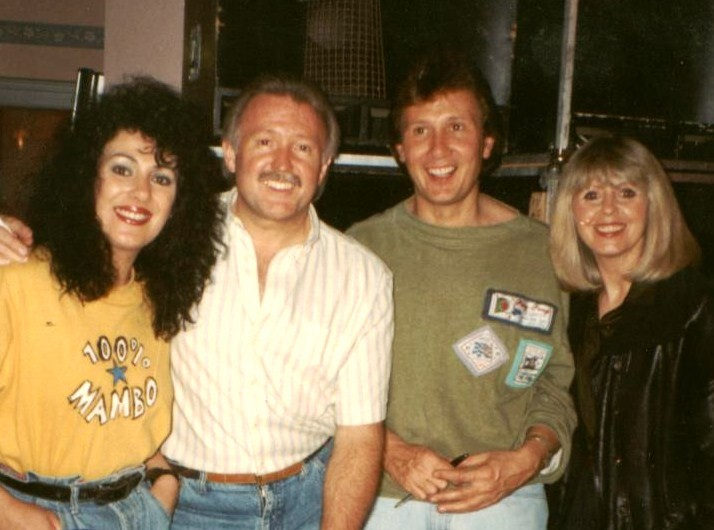
Brotherhood of Man became the third British act to win the contest in 1976 with their song "Save Your Kisses for Me".

Having finished second on three further occasions in the 1970s – with Mary Hopkin in 1970, The New Seekers in 1972 and The Shadows in 1975 – the UK achieved its third win in 1976 with Brotherhood of Man and "Save Your Kisses for Me", who won with 164 points, which would remain the highest points total for ten years. In 1977, the UK finished second for the tenth time, represented by singer-songwriters Lynsey de Paul and Mike Moran.

=== 1980s and 1990s ===
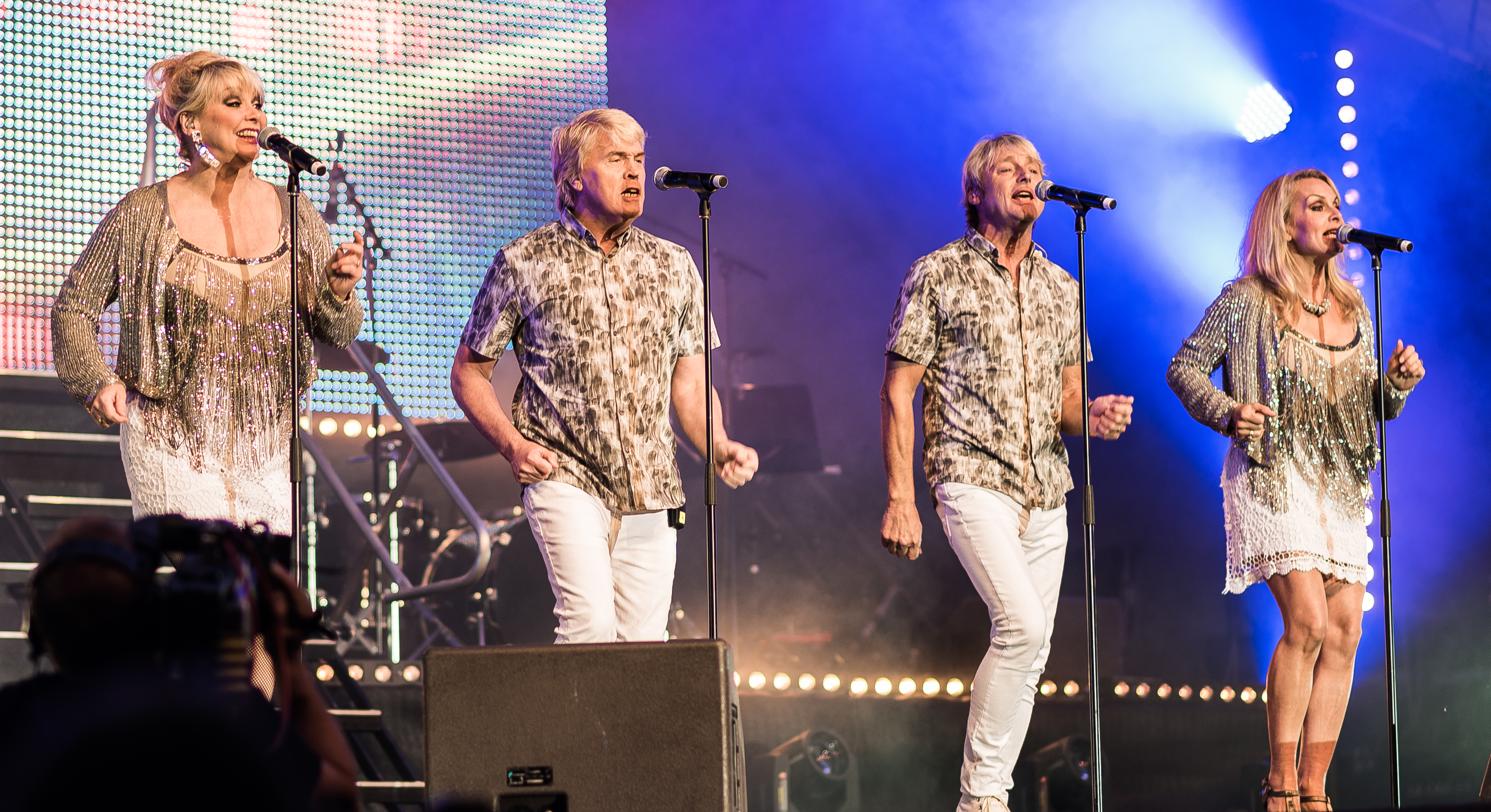
Bucks Fizz won the contest in 1981 with "Making Your Mind Up".

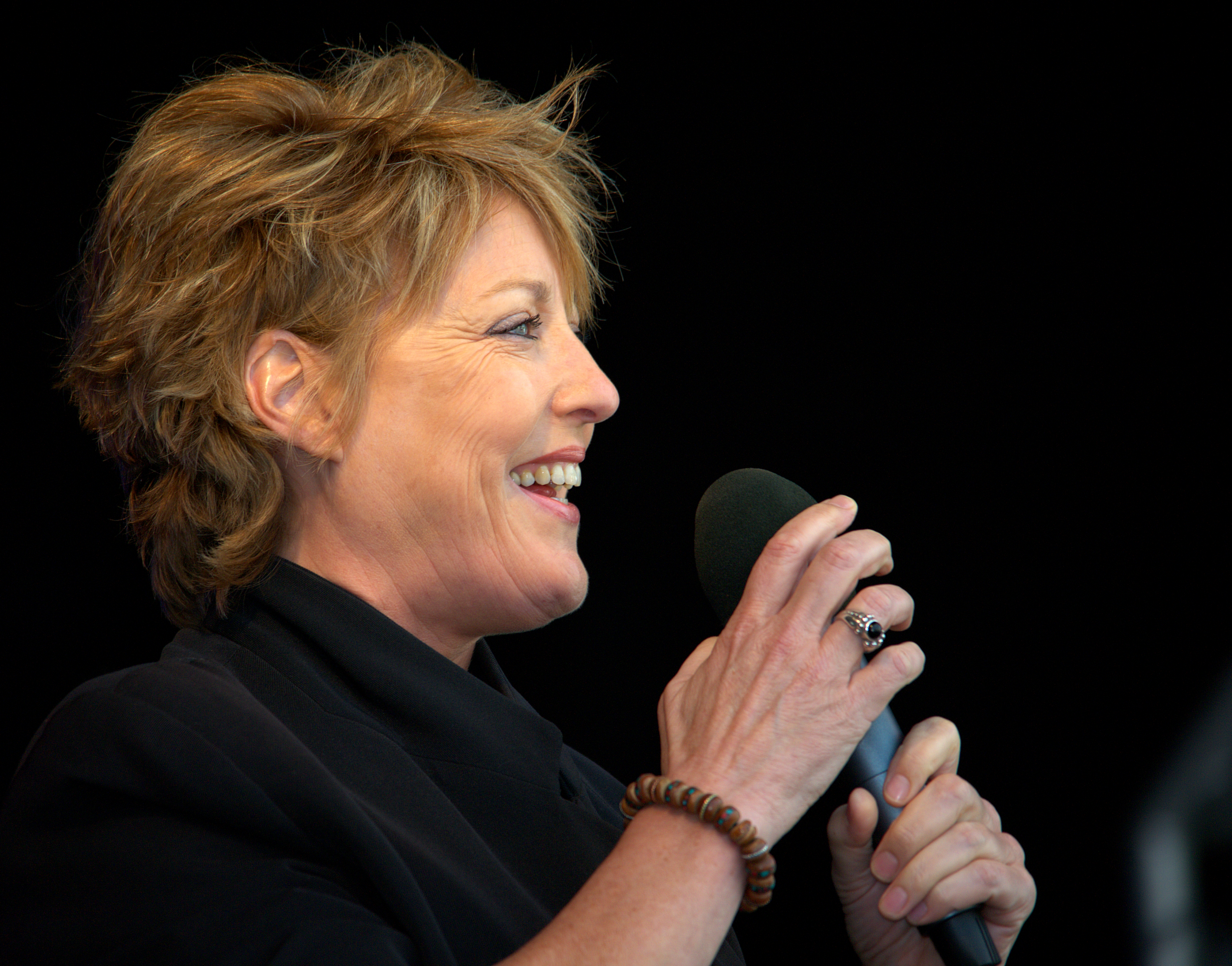
Katrina and the Waves are the fifth and most recent act to win the contest for the UK, having done so in 1997.

The UK's fourth victory came in 1981, with Bucks Fizz and "Making Your Mind Up". The group was created especially for the UK televised selection contest, A Song for Europe (a programme which in later years would be renamed to Making Your Mind Up). At Eurovision in Dublin, they defeated Germany's Lena Valaitis by four points. The group went on to continued success, with 13 UK top 40 hits over the next five years. This would be the last UK win for 16 years, although the country continued to be competitive at the contest with four more second-place results during this time. In 1988, Scott Fitzgerald lost to Celine Dion, who was representing Switzerland, by just one point. In 1989, Live Report lost out to Yugoslavia by seven points. Michael Ball in 1992, also finished second, behind Linda Martin of Ireland. The 1993 entry, Sonia, had already had ten UK top 30 hits, including a 1989 number one with "You'll Never Stop Me Loving You", when she was selected to represent the UK in Millstreet. She finished second to Ireland's Niamh Kavanagh, who won by 23 points. Despite only finishing eighth in the 1996 contest, Gina G went on to huge success with her entry "Ooh Aah... Just a Little Bit", which became only the second non-winning UK entry to top the UK Singles Chart. It also reached the top 20 of the US Billboard Hot 100 and received a Grammy nomination for Best Dance Recording. The UK's fifth victory came in 1997, when Katrina and the Waves, famous for their 1980s hit "Walking on Sunshine", comfortably won the contest with the song "Love Shine a Light". They scored 227 points, which would remain the highest points total of the pre-semi-final era. At the 1998 contest in Birmingham, Imaani achieved the UK's 15th second-place finish and 20th top two result, with the song "Where Are You?", losing to Israel's Dana International. The UK would not finish in the top two again for 24 years.

=== 21st century ===
The UK has fared less well in the contest in the 21st century. After girl-group Precious finished 12th in 1999, the UK regularly placed in the bottom half of the scoreboard, with a few exceptions. In the 2000s, those exceptions were Jessica Garlick in 2002, who finished joint third with the song "Come Back", and Jade Ewen in 2009, who was praised for ending the country's poor run of results for much of the decade, by finishing fifth with the song "It's My Time". In 2003, the UK finished last in the final for the first time with the duo Jemini, who received the infamous nul points. The country then finished last on two further occasions over the next seven years, with Andy Abraham, who received 14 points in 2008, and Josh Dubovie, who received 10 points in 2010.

In 2011, the BBC announced that it would forgo the national selection and instead internally select the next representative, eventually selecting the boy band Blue to represent the UK. They finished 11th with 100 points. In 2012, the UK were facing calls to quit the contest when the UK entry, Engelbert Humperdinck, finished 25th (out of 26) with only 12 points. However, the UK confirmed its participation in the 2013 contest, with the Welsh singer Bonnie Tyler, best known for her 1983 US and UK number one hit "Total Eclipse of the Heart", representing the country with her song "Believe in Me". In Malmö, she finished 19th with 23 points.

In 2014, the BBC internally selected unknown singer Molly Smitten-Downes, through BBC Introducing, which supports new and unsigned acts. She represented the UK in Copenhagen under her mononym Molly. In the final, she performed the song "Children of the Universe", which she co-wrote with Anders Hansson and finished in 17th place with 40 points, having been regarded as one of the favourites to win the contest. In October 2014, Guy Freeman stated that the BBC were still engaging with record companies and the BBC Introducing platform in order to find an entry for the 2015 contest via the internal selection process, but announced that in addition, for the first time since 2008, it would be giving the general public the option to submit an entry for consideration. Ultimately, the entry for 2015 came through open submission, with the song "Still in Love with You" performed by the duo Electro Velvet finishing in 24th place with five points.

On 30 September 2015, the BBC confirmed the national selection show would return in 2016. Six acts competed in the national final on 26 February and the winner was selected entirely through a public vote, consisting of televoting and online voting. "You're Not Alone" performed by Joe and Jake won the national final broadcast live on BBC Four. In the final, they came 24th with 62 points in total. Of these only 8 were from the public vote, the second lowest public score, following 0 to the Czech Republic. In spite of the disappointing result, the BBC announced the national final format would be retained for 2017. Six acts again participated in the final, which was held on 27 January 2017. It was broadcast on BBC Two as opposed to BBC Four the previous year, and the winner was determined by a combination of scores from a professional jury and televoting (including votes cast online). Former X Factor contestant Lucie Jones won the show and earned the right to represent the UK at the 2017 contest in Kyiv, with the song "Never Give Up on You", becoming the 60th UK Eurovision entry. The song was praised for its impressive staging, and finished 15th in the final with a combined score of 111 points, finishing 10th in the jury vote with 99 points and 20th in the televote with 12 points. In 2018, "Storm" by SuRie was selected by the public to represent the UK. Her performance during the final was marred by an invader who ran onstage halfway through the song and grabbed her microphone, interrupting her performance; however, she was able to complete her performance. She finished in 24th with a combined score of 48. Michael Rice's song "Bigger than Us" was selected by the public to represent the UK in 2019. It finished in 26th place in the final after amassing 11 points, marking the fourth time since the turn of the century that the UK had finished last.

Ahead of the 2020 contest, the BBC stated that it would return to internally selecting its representative, in collaboration with record label BMG. James Newman was chosen as the entrant with his song "My Last Breath"; however, the 2020 contest was cancelled due to the COVID-19 pandemic. The BBC subsequently announced that BBC Studios would produce Eurovision: Come Together, a replacement show for BBC One featuring classic Eurovision performances, interviews and a look at the entries that would have taken part in 2020. The show was part of the BBC's plan to "entertain the nation in time of need". The contest returned in 2021, with Newman being selected again with a new song, "Embers". However, the song finished in last place and became the second UK entry to receive nul points (also the first full nul points since the 2016 voting system was first implemented).

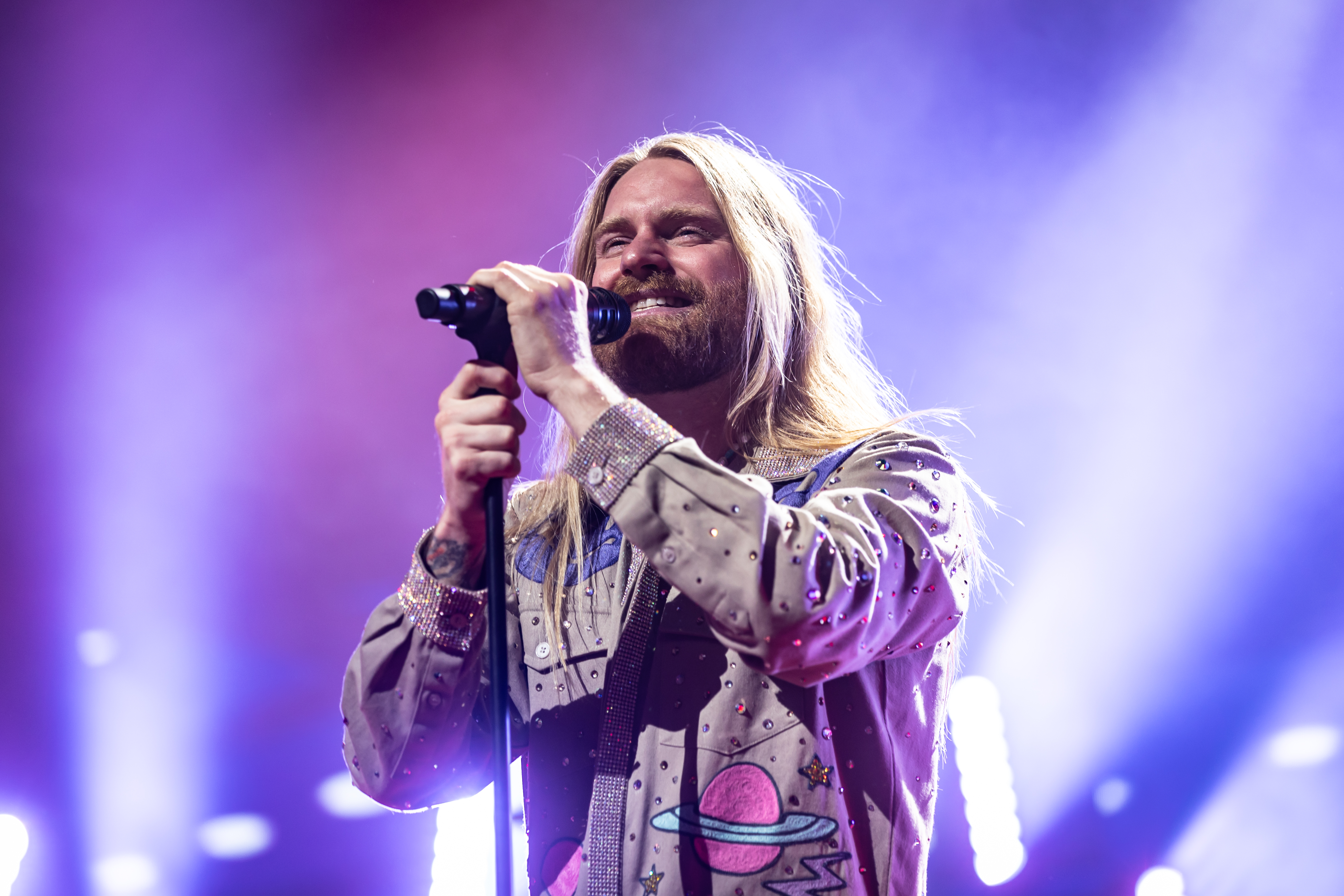
2022 runner-up Sam Ryder became the highest-scoring UK entrant with 466 points.

For the 2022 contest, the BBC retained the internal selection format, this time working in partnership with TaP Music. Sam Ryder and his song "Space Man" were selected for the contest and went on to place second with 466 points, the best result achieved by the UK since 1998, earning the most points in the jury vote, and the most points ever received for a UK entry. Ryder also won the Marcel Bezençon Award in the Press category, becoming the first ever UK act to receive the award since its inception in 2002. He was praised by the media for his positive attitude and desire to change the UK public and press' perception of the contest.

The BBC continued its partnership with TaP Music for the 2023 contest, after the success of 2022. However, they were unable to replicate the previous year's success, with Mae Muller and her entry "I Wrote a Song" finishing in 25th place on home soil in Liverpool, with 24 points in total. Later that year, TaP Music announced that it would end its partnership with the BBC. Former Years & Years frontman Olly Alexander with "Dizzy" finished 18th in 2024 with 46 points, all from the juries. Girl group Remember Monday with "What the Hell Just Happened?" placed 19th in 2025 with 88 points, also all from the juries. Look Mum No Computer with "Eins, Zwei, Drei" finished 25th (last) in 2026 with one point, again all from the juries.

On 24 January 2024, the BBC announced that a number of series' tender rights would be put up for auction as part of the corporation's "Competitive Tender" policy, allowing third-parties to bid on producing the programme. On 9 August, it was announced that BBC Studios had retained the tender to produce the UK live coverage for two years starting in May 2026. In the event that the UK wins during the validity of this tender, as host broadcaster, the BBC would run a separate tender to select the producer of a UK-hosted contest. In September 2026, it was revealed that a parliamentary committee would hold a state of play inquiry to investigate the country's performance in recent contests following a string of bottom-tier finishes.

== United Kingdom and the "Big" countries ==
In 1999, a rule change allowed the United Kingdom, along with France, Germany, and Spain, to automatically qualify for the final, irrespective of their recent results and without entering a semi-final, due to those countries' participating broadcasters being the largest financial contributors to the EBU. These countries subsequently became known as the "Big Four", a group which was expanded into the "Big Five" in 2011 with the return of Italy to the contest.

In 2008, it was reported that the "Big Four" could lose their status and be forced to compete in the semi-finals; however, this never materialised, and the rule remained in place. In the same year, the BBC defended using money from TV licence fee payers for the contest when Liberal Democrat MP Richard Younger-Ross had tabled a Commons motion which called on the corporation to withdraw its £173,000 funding for the annual contest. Former Eurovision commentator Sir Terry Wogan, that same year, also claimed that the show is "no longer a music contest" after the final of that year's edition ended.

== Selection process ==
As well as broadcasting the contest each year, the BBC also organises the selection process for the entry, often with a televised national final (historically titled A Song for Europe). The process has varied between selecting both performer and song, or just the song, with the artist being selected internally.

For most years the public has been able to vote for the winner, in the past with postcard voting, where the viewers sent postcards with their vote to the BBC, but more recently televoting and online. In 2009 and 2010, the singer was chosen by a public vote and the song internally selected. From 2011 to 2015, there was no televised selection, and both the artist and song were selected internally by the BBC. This resulted in the national selection process being suspended; however, this returned in 2016, re-titled Eurovision: You Decide, with viewers once again choosing which song to enter into the contest. Since 2017, the votes from a professional jury panel have been combined with the public vote to select the winner. The televised selection process was suspended again in September 2019, with the BBC returning to internally selecting its entry (in partnership with BMG in 2020 and 2021, and with TaP Music in 2022 and 2023).

== Participation overview ==
Below is a list of all songs and their respective performers that have represented the United Kingdom in the contest:

Table key
1	First place
2	Second place
3	Third place
◁	Last place
◇	Entry selected but did not compete
†	Upcoming event

Year	Artist	Song	Language	Final	Points	Semi	Points
1957	Patricia Bredin	"All"	English	7	6	No semi-finals	
1959	Pearl Carr and Teddy Johnson	"Sing Little Birdie"	English	2	16	No semi-finals	
1960	Bryan Johnson	"Looking High, High, High"	English	2	25	No semi-finals	
1961	The Allisons	"Are You Sure?"	English	2	24	No semi-finals	
1962	Ronnie Carroll	"Ring-A-Ding Girl"	English	4	10	No semi-finals	
1963	Ronnie Carroll	"Say Wonderful Things"	English	4	28	No semi-finals	
1964	Matt Monro	"I Love the Little Things"	English	2	17	No semi-finals	
1965	Kathy Kirby	"I Belong"	English	2	26	No semi-finals	
1966	Kenneth McKellar	"A Man Without Love"	English	9	8	No semi-finals	
1967	Sandie Shaw	"Puppet on a String"	English	1	47	No semi-finals	
1968	Cliff Richard	"Congratulations"	English	2	28	No semi-finals	
1969	Lulu	"Boom Bang-a-Bang"	English	1	18	No semi-finals	
1970	Mary Hopkin	"Knock, Knock (Who's There?)"	English	2	26	No semi-finals	
1971	Clodagh Rodgers	"Jack in the Box"	English	4	98	No semi-finals	
1972	The New Seekers	"Beg, Steal or Borrow"	English	2	114	No semi-finals	
1973	Cliff Richard	"Power to All Our Friends"	English	3	123	No semi-finals	
1974	Olivia Newton-John	"Long Live Love"	English	4	14	No semi-finals	
1975	The Shadows	"Let Me Be the One"	English	2	138	No semi-finals	
1976	Brotherhood of Man	"Save Your Kisses for Me"	English	1	164	No semi-finals	
1977	Lynsey de Paul and Mike Moran	"Rock Bottom"	English	2	121	No semi-finals	
1978	Co-Co	"The Bad Old Days"	English	11	61	No semi-finals	
1979	Black Lace	"Mary Ann"	English	7	73	No semi-finals	
1980	Prima Donna	"Love Enough for Two"	English	3	106	No semi-finals	
1981	Bucks Fizz	"Making Your Mind Up"	English	1	136	No semi-finals	
1982	Bardo	"One Step Further"	English	7	76	No semi-finals	
1983	Sweet Dreams	"I'm Never Giving Up"	English	6	79	No semi-finals	
1984	Belle and the Devotions	"Love Games"	English	7	63	No semi-finals	
1985	Vikki	"Love Is"	English	4	100	No semi-finals	
1986	Ryder	"Runner in the Night"	English	7	72	No semi-finals	
1987	Rikki	"Only the Light"	English	13	47	No semi-finals	
1988	Scott Fitzgerald	"Go"	English	2	136	No semi-finals	
1989	Live Report	"Why Do I Always Get It Wrong"	English	2	130	No semi-finals	
1990	Emma	"Give a Little Love Back to the World"	English	6	87	No semi-finals	
1991	Samantha Janus	"A Message to Your Heart"	English	10	47	No semi-finals	
1992	Michael Ball	"One Step Out of Time"	English	2	139	No semi-finals	
1993	Sonia	"Better the Devil You Know"	English	2	164	Kvalifikacija za Millstreet	
1994	Frances Ruffelle	"We Will Be Free (Lonely Symphony)"	English	10	63	No semi-finals	
1995	Love City Groove	"Love City Groove"	English	10	76	No semi-finals	
1996	Gina G	"Ooh Aah... Just a Little Bit"	English	8	77	3	153
1997	Katrina and the Waves	"Love Shine a Light"	English	1	227	No semi-finals	
1998	Imaani	"Where Are You?"	English	2	166	No semi-finals	
1999	Precious	"Say It Again"	English	12	38	No semi-finals	
2000	Nicki French	"Don't Play That Song Again"	English	16	28	No semi-finals	
2001	Lindsay Dracass	"No Dream Impossible"	English	15	28	No semi-finals	
2002	Jessica Garlick	"Come Back"	English	3	111	No semi-finals	
2003	Jemini	"Cry Baby"	English	26 ◁	0	No semi-finals	
2004	James Fox	"Hold On to Our Love"	English	16	29	Member of the "Big Four"	
2005	Javine	"Touch My Fire"	English	22	18	Member of the "Big Four"	
2006	Daz Sampson	"Teenage Life"	English	19	25	Member of the "Big Four"	
2007	Scooch	"Flying the Flag (For You)"	English	22	19	Member of the "Big Four"	
2008	Andy Abraham	"Even If"	English	25 ◁	14	Member of the "Big Four"	
2009	Jade Ewen	"It's My Time"	English	5	173	Member of the "Big Four"	
2010	Josh Dubovie	"That Sounds Good to Me"	English	25 ◁	10	Member of the "Big Four"	
2011	Blue	"I Can"	English	11	100	Member of the "Big Five"	
2012	Engelbert Humperdinck	"Love Will Set You Free"	English	25	12	Member of the "Big Five"	
2013	Bonnie Tyler	"Believe in Me"	English	19	23	Member of the "Big Five"	
2014	Molly	"Children of the Universe"	English	17	40	Member of the "Big Five"	
2015	Electro Velvet	"Still in Love with You"	English	24	5	Member of the "Big Five"	
2016	Joe and Jake	"You're Not Alone"	English	24	62	Member of the "Big Five"	
2017	Lucie Jones	"Never Give Up on You"	English	15	111	Member of the "Big Five"	
2018	SuRie	"Storm"	English	24	48	Member of the "Big Five"	
2019	Michael Rice	"Bigger than Us"	English	26 ◁	11	Member of the "Big Five"	
2020	James Newman ◇	"My Last Breath" ◇	English ◇	Contest cancelled (Note: The 2020 contest was cancelled due to the COVID-19 pandemic.)		Member of the "Big Five"	
2021	James Newman	"Embers"	English	26 ◁	0	Member of the "Big Five"	
2022	Sam Ryder	"Space Man"	English	2	466	Member of the "Big Five"	
2023	Mae Muller	"I Wrote a Song"	English	25	24	Member of the "Big Five"; Host country	
2024	Olly Alexander	"Dizzy"	English	18	46	Member of the "Big Five"	
2025	Remember Monday	"What the Hell Just Happened?"	English	19	88	Member of the "Big Five"	
2026	Look Mum No Computer	"Eins, Zwei, Drei"	English, German	25 ◁	1	Member of the "Big Four"	
2027	Confirmed intention to participate †					Member of the "Big Four"	

=== Congratulations: 50 Years of the Eurovision Song Contest ===
Although the United Kingdom was entered twice into Congratulations: 50 Years of the Eurovision Song Contest, with Cliff Richard's 1968 runner-up entry "Congratulations" and Brotherhood of Man's 1976 winning song "Save Your Kisses for Me", the BBC decided not to air the event or participate in the voting, but instead aired an hour-long special programme in May 2006, titled Boom Bang-a-Bang: 50 Years of Eurovision and hosted by Terry Wogan. The programme featured archive footage and highlights of past contests, along with a performance of that year's UK entry by Daz Sampson.

Artist	Song	Language	At Congratulations				At Eurovision		
Artist	Song	Language	Final	Points	Semi	Points	Year	Place	Points
Cliff Richard	"Congratulations"	English	Failed to qualify		8	105	1968	2	28
Brotherhood of Man	"Save Your Kisses for Me"	English	5 ◁	230	5	154	1976	1	164

=== Eurovision: Come Together ===
Following the cancellation of the 2020 contest due to the COVID-19 pandemic, the BBC decided to host Eurovision: Come Together, a competitive special on the night of what would have been the 2020 final. The show was broadcast just before the EBU's main replacement show Eurovision: Europe Shine a Light. An expert panel selected the 19 competing entries, four of which were UK entries.

== Hostings ==
The United Kingdom has hosted the Eurovision Song Contest a record nine times. The BBC stepped in and hosted the contest for the Netherlands in 1960, France in 1963, Monaco in 1972 and Luxembourg in 1974 due to the winning countries' financial and capacity issues, and for Ukraine in 2023 due to the Russian invasion of the country. On four occasions (1968, 1977, 1982, and 1998) the UK was given the right to host as a result of a victory. The BBC offered to joint host the 1995 contest in Belfast, Northern Ireland with Irish broadcaster RTÉ, but ultimately RTÉ decided to stage the event solo.

Year	Location	Venue	Executive producer	Director	Musical director	Presenter(s)	Ref.
1960	London	Royal Festival Hall	Harry Carlisle	Innes Lloyd	Eric Robinson	Katie Boyle	
1963	London	BBC Television Centre	Harry Carlisle	Yvonne Littlewood	Eric Robinson	Katie Boyle	
1968	London	Royal Albert Hall	Tom Sloan	Stewart Morris	Norrie Paramor	Katie Boyle	
1972	Edinburgh	Usher Hall	Bill Cotton	Terry Hughes	Malcolm Lockyer	Moira Shearer	
1974	Brighton	Brighton Dome	Bill Cotton	Michael Hurll	Ronnie Hazlehurst	Katie Boyle	
1977	London	Wembley Conference Centre	Bill Cotton	Stewart Morris	Ronnie Hazlehurst	Angela Rippon	
1982	Harrogate	Harrogate International Centre	Michael Hurll		Ronnie Hazlehurst	Jan Leeming	
1998	Birmingham	National Indoor Arena	Kevin Bishop	Geoff Posner	Martin Koch	Terry Wogan and Ulrika Jonsson	
2023	Liverpool	Liverpool Arena	Andrew Cartmell	Nikki Parsons, Richard Valentine and Ollie Bartlett	—N/a (Note: No orchestra has been present in the contest since 1999; Kojo Samuel was musical director for the 2023 contest's opening and interval acts.)	Alesha Dixon, Hannah Waddingham and Julia Sanina (all shows) and Graham Norton (final)	

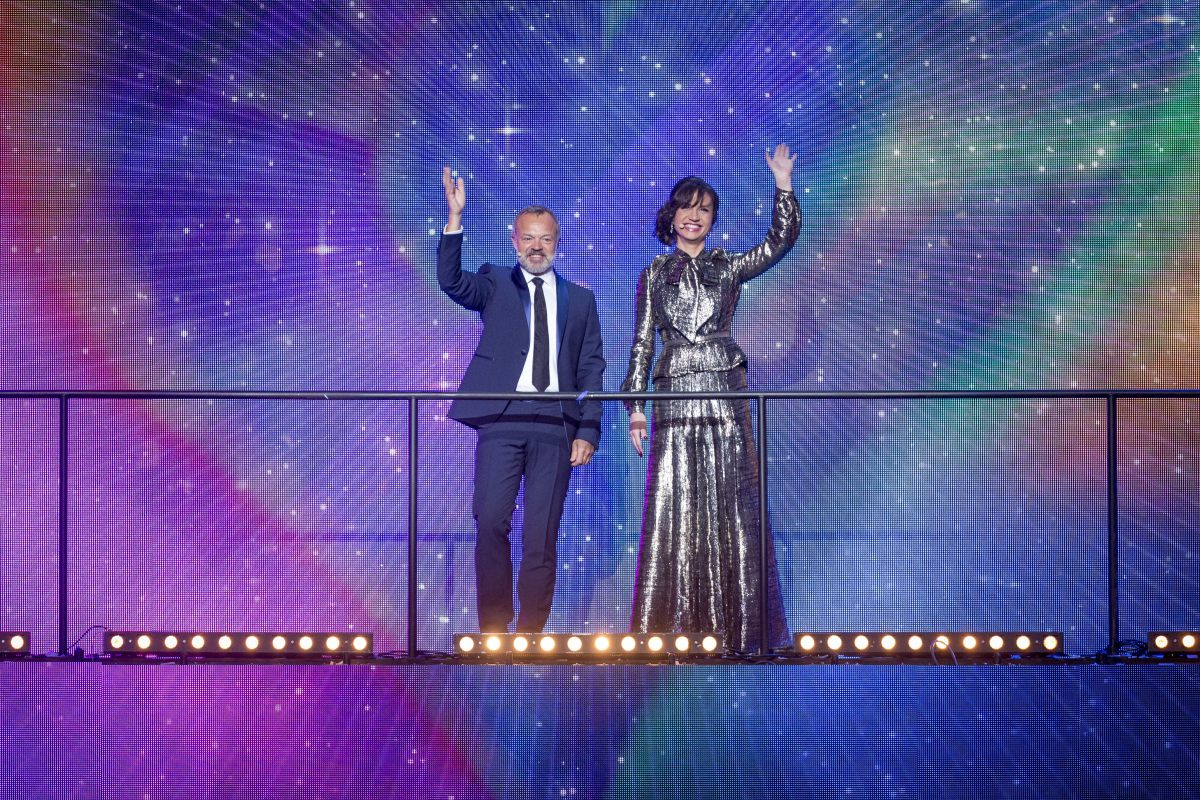
Graham Norton and Petra Mede, the presenters of Eurovision Song Contest's Greatest Hits

In addition to the contest proper, the United Kingdom hosted Eurovision Song Contest's Greatest Hits, a special concert programme to commemorate the contest's 60th anniversary, at the Hammersmith Apollo in London. Guy Freeman served as executive producer, Geoff Posner was the show's director, and Graham Norton and Petra Mede served as presenters. The show was recorded on 31 March 2015 and was broadcast in 26 countries, starting with the UK and Ireland on 3 April. It was watched by 1.89 million viewers in the UK with a market share of 9.5%.

== Awards ==
=== AP Awards ===
Year	Category	Song	Performer(s)	Place	Points	Host city
2004	Composer Award	"Hold Onto Our Love"	James Fox	16	29	(Turkey) Istanbul

=== Marcel Bezençon Awards ===
Year	Category	Song	Composer(s) lyrics (l) / music (m)	Performer	Final	Points	Host city	Ref.
2022	Press Award	"Space Man"	Sam Ryder, Amy Wadge, Max Wolfgang (m&l)	Sam Ryder	2	466	(Italy) Turin	

== Related involvement ==
=== Conductors ===
Year	Conductor (Note: All conductors are of British nationality unless otherwise noted.)	Musical Director	Notes	Ref.
1957	Eric Robinson	N/A		
1959	Eric Robinson	N/A		
1960	Eric Robinson		(Note: Also conducted the Luxembourgish entry)	
1961	Harry Robinson	NA		
1962	Angela Morley	NA	(Note: Transitioned in 1972; conducted at the contest while still under the name Wally Stott.)	
1963	Eric Robinson		(Note: Also conducted for Luxembourg, the Netherlands, and Switzerland)	
1964	Harry Rabinowitz	—N/a		
1965	Eric Robinson	—N/a		
1966	Harry Rabinowitz	—N/a		
1967	Kenny Woodman	—N/a		
1968	Norrie Paramor			
1969	Johnny Harris	N/A		
1970	Johnny Arthey	N/A		
1971	Johnny Arthey	N/A	(Note: Norrie Paramor was the musical director for the national final.)	
1972	David Mackay	Malcolm Lockyer		
1973	David Mackay	N/A		
1974	Nick Ingman	Ronnie Hazlehurst		
1975	Alyn Ainsworth	N/A		
1976	Alyn Ainsworth	N/A		
1977	Ronnie Hazlehurst		(Note: Also conducted the German entry)	
1978	Alyn Ainsworth	N/A		
1979	Ken Jones	N/A	(Note: Alyn Ainsworth was the musical director for the national final.)	
1980	John Coleman	N/A		
1981	John Coleman	N/A		
1982	Ronnie Hazlehurst			
1983	John Coleman	N/A		
1984	John Coleman	N/A		
1985	John Coleman	N/A		
1986	N/A		(Note: Ronnie Hazlehurst was the musical director for the national final.)	
1987	Ronnie Hazlehurst	N/A		
1988	Ronnie Hazlehurst	N/A		
1989	Ronnie Hazlehurst	N/A		
1990	Alyn Ainsworth	N/A		
1991	Ronnie Hazlehurst	N/A		
1992	Ronnie Hazlehurst	N/A		
1993	Nigel Wright	N/A		
1994	Michael Reed	N/A		
1995	Mike Dixon	N/A		
1996	Ernie Dunstall	N/A		
1997	Don Airey	N/A		
1998	James McMillan	Martin Koch	(Note: Koch conducted the opening and interval music, and the French entry.)	

Additionally, several British conductors have conducted for other countries (not counting instances where a British musical director had to step in for another country that didn't bring their own conductor), including:

Conductor	Country	Year(s)	Notes
Alberto Semprini	Italy	1958	Half-Italian
Richard Hill	Portugal	1972	
Charles Blackwell	Luxembourg	1974	
Les Humphries	Germany	1976	Leader of the Les Humphries Singers
Alyn Ainsworth	Belgium	1977	
Johnny Arthey	Luxembourg	1977	
Del Newman	Italy	1980	
Martyn Ford	Cyprus	1982, 1986	
Mike Sergeant	Portugal	1983, 1998	
Colin Frechter	Portugal	1986	
Nigel Wright	Iceland	1992	

=== Heads of delegation ===
Each participating broadcaster in the Eurovision Song Contest assigns a head of delegation as the EBU's contact person and the leader of their delegation at the event. The delegation, whose size can greatly vary, includes a head of press, the performers, songwriters, composers, and backing vocalists, among others.

Year	Head of delegation	Ref.
1976	Bill Cotton	
1988–1993	Jim Moir	
1994–2007	Kevin Bishop	
2008–2010	Dominic Smith	
2011	Helen Tumbridge	
2012–2013	Andrew Cartmell	
2014–2017	Guy Freeman	
2018	Helen Riddell	
2019–2022	Andrew Cartmell	
2023	Adam Wydrzynski	
2024	Lee Smithurst	
2025–	Andrew Cartmell	

=== Costume designers ===
Year	Costume designers	Ref.
1990	Benetton	
1969 & 1991–1992	Linda Martin	
1993	Verity Lewis	
1994	Helen Storey	
1996	Paco Rabanne	
2009	Amanda Wakeley	
2022	Luke Day	

=== Commentators and spokespersons ===
Over the years, the BBC's commentary at the contest has been provided by several experienced radio and television presenters, including Tom Fleming, David Vine, David Jacobs, Dave Lee Travis, Pete Murray, John Dunn, and Michael Aspel. Terry Wogan provided BBC TV commentary from 1980 to 2008. After Wogan stepped down from commentary duties, he was replaced by Graham Norton from 2009.

The final of the contest has been broadcast by BBC One (previously BBC Television Service and BBC TV) since the first contest in 1956. The first live colour transmission of the contest in the United Kingdom was in 1970 (though the 1968 contest had been repeated in colour on BBC Two the day after the live telecast on BBC One), and the first high definition broadcast of the contest began in 2007 when the contest was simulcast on BBC HD for the first time (this continued until the channel's closure). Outside the UK, the final was broadcast by BBC Prime from its launch in 1995 and continued to 2006; it was previously aired by its predecessor BBC World Service Television from 1992 and on BBC TV Europe in 1991. The final has also been broadcast on radio since 1968, originally on BBC Radio 1 (simulcast on Radio 2), then moving to Radio 2 from the 1971 contest where it has remained ever since (except from 1983 to 1985, the first year of which was due to a scheduling clash with the St. George's Day Concert). From 1971 to 1989, it was also broadcast on BBC local radio stations. From 1970 to 1976, then in 1980 and again from 1983 until 1985, the contest was also broadcast on BFBS Radio, and on its television service in the years 1989–1993 and 1997–2006.

A simulcast of the 2002 contest was broadcast on BBC Choice with alternative commentary by Jenny Eclair. This was the first time the BBC had provided three different commentary options, the second was in 2023. For the 2023 contest, additional coverage of all three shows was broadcast on BBC iPlayer with British Sign Language interpretation; in 2024, this coverage moved to BBC Red Button.

From 2004 to 2015, and again in 2022, both semi-finals were broadcast on BBC Three. During BBC Three's tenure as an online only channel, semi-final coverage was broadcast on BBC Four. In 2023, the semi-finals and final were broadcast on BBC One, BBC Radio 2, and BBC Radio Merseyside, with the latter providing alternative Liverpudlian commentary by Claire Sweeney and Paul Quinn (chosen as part of the station's "The Voice of Eurovision" talent search campaign) for the final. In August 2023, it was confirmed that the semi-finals would remain on BBC One for the 2024 contest; and later also on BBC Radio 2. In 2014, Ana Matronic provided commentary for the second semi-final of the 2014 contest on BBC Radio 2 Eurovision, a temporary station which was broadcast on DAB radio over four days, as well as the BBC Radio 2 website. She continued this role in 2015.

In the 1998 contest, hosted in Birmingham, Wogan acted as both commentator and on-stage presenter (together with Ulrika Jonsson). Norton performed a similar role in the final of the 2023 contest, hosted in Liverpool, with Mel Giedroyc serving as co-commentator. In the 1980 contest, each song was introduced by a presenter from its country, with the UK entry being introduced by Noel Edmonds.

Television and radio commentators and spokespersons
Year	Television		Radio		Alternative broadcasts		Spokesperson	Ref.
Year	Channel	Commentator(s)	Channel	Commentator(s)	Channel	Commentator(s)	Spokesperson	Ref.
1956 (Note: The BBC took only partial live transmission of the event, joining only for the second set of entries from each country.)	BBC Television Service	Wilfrid Thomas	No radio broadcast		No broadcast		Did not participate	
1957	BBC Television Service	Berkeley Smith	No radio broadcast		No broadcast		Unknown	
1958 (Note: BBC Television had scheduled to broadcast the contest on 12 March 1958, however due to live coverage of a sports event on the same day meant that the broadcast had to be delayed until 16 March.)	BBC Television Service	Peter Haigh	No radio broadcast		No broadcast		Did not participate	
1959	BBC Television Service	Tom Sloan	No radio broadcast		No broadcast		Unknown	
1960	BBC Television Service	David Jacobs	No radio broadcast		No broadcast		Nick Burrell-Davis	
1961	BBC TV	Tom Sloan	No radio broadcast		No broadcast		Michael Aspel	
1962	BBC TV	David Jacobs	No radio broadcast		No broadcast		Alex Macintosh	
1963	BBC TV	David Jacobs	No radio broadcast		No broadcast		Unknown	
1964	BBC TV	David Jacobs	No radio broadcast		No broadcast		Unknown	
1965	BBC1	David Jacobs	No radio broadcast		BFBS Radio	Ian Fenner	Unknown	
1966	BBC1	David Jacobs	No radio broadcast		BFBS Radio	Ian Fenner	Michael Aspel	
1967	BBC1	Rolf Harris	No radio broadcast		BFBS Radio	Thurston Holland	Michael Aspel	
1968	BBC1, BBC2 (Note: Re-broadcast in colour the following day)	No commentator	BBC Radio 1, BBC Radio 2	Pete Murray	BFBS Radio	Thurston Holland	Michael Aspel	
1969	BBC1	David Gell	BBC Radio 1, BBC Radio 2	Pete Murray	BFBS Radio	John Russell	Colin Ward-Lewis	
1970	BBC1	David Gell	BBC Radio 1, BBC Radio 2	Tony Brandon	BFBS Radio	John Russell	Colin Ward-Lewis	
1971	BBC1	Dave Lee Travis	BBC Radio 1, BBC Radio 2	Terry Wogan	BFBS Radio	John Russell	No spokesperson	
1972	BBC1	Tom Fleming	BBC Radio 1, BBC Radio 2	Pete Murray	BFBS Radio	Terry James	No spokesperson	
1973	BBC1	Terry Wogan	BBC Radio 1, BBC Radio 2	Pete Murray	BFBS Radio	Richard Astbury	No spokesperson	
1974	BBC1	David Vine	BBC Radio 1, BBC Radio 2	Terry Wogan	BFBS Radio	Richard Astbury	Colin Ward-Lewis	
1975	BBC1	Pete Murray	BBC Radio 1, BBC Radio 2	Terry Wogan	BFBS Radio	Terry Wogan	Ray Moore	
1976	BBC1	Michael Aspel	BBC Radio 1, BBC Radio 2	Terry Wogan	BFBS Radio	Andrew Pastouna	Ray Moore	
1977	BBC1	Pete Murray	BBC Radio 1, BBC Radio 2	Terry Wogan	No broadcast		Colin Berry	
1978	BBC1	Terry Wogan	BBC Radio 1, BBC Radio 2	Ray Moore	No broadcast		Colin Berry	
1979	BBC1	John Dunn	BBC Radio 2	Ray Moore	No broadcast		Colin Berry	
1980	BBC1	Terry Wogan	BBC Radio 1, BBC Radio 2	Steve Jones	BFBS Radio	Andrew Pastouna	Ray Moore	
1981	BBC1	Terry Wogan	BBC Radio 2	Ray Moore	No broadcast		Colin Berry	
1982	BBC1	Terry Wogan	BBC Radio 2	Ray Moore	No broadcast		Colin Berry	
1983	BBC1	Terry Wogan	No radio broadcast		BFBS Radio	Richard Nankivell	Colin Berry	
1984	BBC1	Terry Wogan	No radio broadcast		BFBS Radio	Richard Nankivell	Colin Berry	
1985	BBC1	Terry Wogan	No radio broadcast		BFBS Radio	Richard Nankivell	Colin Berry	
1986	BBC1	Terry Wogan	BBC Radio 2	Ray Moore	No broadcast		Colin Berry	
1987	BBC1	Terry Wogan	BBC Radio 2	Ray Moore	No broadcast		Colin Berry	
1988	BBC1	Terry Wogan	BBC Radio 2	Ken Bruce	No broadcast		Colin Berry	
1989	BBC1	Terry Wogan	BBC Radio 2	Ken Bruce	SSVC Television	Unknown	Colin Berry	
1990	BBC1, BBC TV Europe	Terry Wogan	BBC Radio 2	Ken Bruce	SSVC Television	Unknown	Colin Berry	
1991	BBC1, BBC World Service Television	Terry Wogan	BBC Radio 2	Ken Bruce	SSVC Television	Unknown	Colin Berry	
1992	BBC1, BBC World Service Television	Terry Wogan	BBC Radio 2	Ken Bruce	SSVC Television	Unknown	Colin Berry	
1993	BBC1, BBC World Service Television	Terry Wogan	BBC Radio 2	Ken Bruce	SSVC Television	Unknown	Colin Berry	
1994	BBC1, BBC World Service Television	Terry Wogan	BBC Radio 2	Ken Bruce	No broadcast		Colin Berry	
1995	BBC1, BBC Prime	Terry Wogan	BBC Radio 2	Ken Bruce	No broadcast		Colin Berry	
1996	BBC1, BBC Prime	Terry Wogan	BBC Radio 2	Ken Bruce	No broadcast		Colin Berry	
1997	BBC1, BBC Prime	Terry Wogan	BBC Radio 2	Ken Bruce	BFBS Television	Terry Wogan	Colin Berry	
1998	BBC One, BBC Prime	Terry Wogan	BBC Radio 2	Ken Bruce	BFBS Television	Unknown	Ken Bruce	
1999	BBC One, BBC Prime	Terry Wogan	BBC Radio 2	Ken Bruce	BFBS Television	Unknown	Colin Berry	
2000	BBC One, BBC Prime	Terry Wogan	BBC Radio 2	Ken Bruce	BFBS Television	Unknown	Colin Berry	
2001	BBC One, BBC Prime	Terry Wogan	BBC Radio 2	Ken Bruce	BFBS Television	Unknown	Colin Berry	
2002	BBC One, BBC Prime	Terry Wogan	BBC Radio 2	Ken Bruce	BBC Choice	Jenny Eclair and Max Flint	Colin Berry	
2002	BBC One, BBC Prime	Terry Wogan	BBC Radio 2	Ken Bruce	BFBS 1, BFBS Radio 2	Unknown	Colin Berry	
2003	BBC One, BBC Prime	Terry Wogan	BBC Radio 2	Ken Bruce	BFBS 1, BFBS Radio 2	Unknown	Lorraine Kelly	
2004	BBC Three (Semi-final); BBC One, BBC Prime (Final)	Paddy O'Connell (Semi-final); Terry Wogan (Final)	BBC Radio 2 (Final)	Ken Bruce	BFBS 1 (Final)	Terry Wogan	Lorraine Kelly	
2005	BBC Three (Semi-final); BBC One, BBC Prime (Final)	Paddy O'Connell (Semi-final); Terry Wogan (Final)	BBC Radio 2 (Final)	Ken Bruce	BFBS 1 (Final)	Unknown	Cheryl Baker	
2006	BBC Three (Semi-final); BBC One, BBC Prime (Final)	Paddy O'Connell (Semi-final); Terry Wogan (Final)	BBC Radio 2 (Final)	Ken Bruce	BFBS 1 (Final)	Unknown	Fearne Cotton	
2007	BBC Three (Semi-final); BBC One, BBC HD (Final)	Paddy O'Connell and Sarah Cawood (Semi-final); Terry Wogan (Final)	BBC Radio 2 (Final)	Ken Bruce	No broadcast		Fearne Cotton	
2008	BBC Three (Semi-finals); BBC One, BBC HD (Final)	Paddy O'Connell and Caroline Flack (Semi-finals); Terry Wogan (Final)	BBC Radio 2 (Final)	Ken Bruce	No broadcast		Carrie Grant	
2009	BBC Three (Semi-finals); BBC One (Final)	Paddy O'Connell and Sarah Cawood (Semi-finals); Graham Norton (Final)	BBC Radio 2 (Final)	Ken Bruce	No broadcast		Duncan James	
2010	BBC Three (Semi-finals); BBC One (Final)	Paddy O'Connell and Sarah Cawood (Semi-finals); Graham Norton (Final)	BBC Radio 2 (Final)	Ken Bruce	No broadcast		Scott Mills	
2011	BBC Three, BBC HD (Semi-finals); BBC One, BBC One HD (Final)	Scott Mills and Sara Cox (Semi-finals); Graham Norton (Final)	BBC Radio 2 (Final)	Ken Bruce	No broadcast		Alex Jones	
2012	BBC Three (Semi-finals); BBC One (Final)	Scott Mills and Sara Cox (Semi-finals); Graham Norton (Final)	BBC Radio 2 (Final)	Ken Bruce	No broadcast		Scott Mills	
2013	BBC Three (Semi-finals); BBC One (Final)	Scott Mills and Ana Matronic (Semi-finals); Graham Norton (Final)	BBC Radio 2 (Final)	Ken Bruce	No broadcast		Scott Mills	
2014	BBC Three (Semi-finals); BBC One (Final)	Scott Mills and Laura Whitmore (Semi-finals); Graham Norton (Final)	BBC Radio 2 Eurovision (SF2)	Ana Matronic	No broadcast		Scott Mills	
2014	BBC Three (Semi-finals); BBC One (Final)	Scott Mills and Laura Whitmore (Semi-finals); Graham Norton (Final)	BBC Radio 2 (Final)	Ken Bruce	No broadcast		Scott Mills	
2015	BBC Three (Semi-finals); BBC One (Final)	Scott Mills and Mel Giedroyc (Semi-finals); Graham Norton (Final)	BBC Radio 2 Eurovision (Semi-finals)	Ana Matronic	No broadcast		Nigella Lawson	
2015	BBC Three (Semi-finals); BBC One (Final)	Scott Mills and Mel Giedroyc (Semi-finals); Graham Norton (Final)	BBC Radio 2 (Final)	Ken Bruce	No broadcast		Nigella Lawson	
2016	BBC Four (Semi-finals); BBC One (Final)	Scott Mills and Mel Giedroyc (Semi-finals); Graham Norton (Final)	BBC Radio 2 (Final)	Ken Bruce	No broadcast		Richard Osman	
2017	BBC Four (Semi-finals); BBC One (Final)	Scott Mills and Mel Giedroyc (Semi-finals); Graham Norton (Final)	BBC Radio 2 (Final)	Ken Bruce	No broadcast		Katrina Leskanich	
2018	BBC Four (Semi-finals); BBC One (Final)	Scott Mills and Rylan Clark-Neal (Semi-finals); Graham Norton (Final)	BBC Radio 2 (Final)	Ken Bruce	No broadcast		Mel Giedroyc	
2019	BBC Four (Semi-finals); BBC One (Final)	Scott Mills and Rylan Clark-Neal (Semi-finals); Graham Norton (Final)	BBC Radio 2 (Final)	Ken Bruce	No broadcast		Rylan Clark-Neal	
~~2020~~	~~BBC Four (Semi-finals)~~; ~~BBC One (Final)~~	~~Scott Mills and Rylan Clark-Neal (Semi-finals)~~; ~~Graham Norton (Final)~~	~~BBC Radio 2 (Final)~~	~~Ken Bruce~~	No broadcast		Not announced before cancellation	
2021	BBC Four (Semi-finals); BBC One (Final)	Scott Mills, Sara Cox (Note: Cox was a late replacement for Rylan Clark-Neal who was absent due to illness but still appeared in pre-recorded segments.) and Chelcee Grimes (Semi-finals); Graham Norton (Final)	BBC Radio 2 (Final)	Ken Bruce	No broadcast		Amanda Holden	
2022	BBC Three (Semi-finals); BBC One (Final)	Scott Mills and Rylan Clark (Semi-finals); Graham Norton (Final)	BBC Radio 2 (Final)	Ken Bruce	No broadcast		AJ Odudu	
2023	BBC One	Scott Mills and Rylan (Semi-finals); Graham Norton and Mel Giedroyc (Final)	BBC Radio 2	Paddy O'Connell (Semi-finals); Scott Mills and Rylan (Final)	BBC iPlayer	British Sign Language interpreters	Catherine Tate	
2023	BBC One	Scott Mills and Rylan (Semi-finals); Graham Norton and Mel Giedroyc (Final)	BBC Radio 2	Paddy O'Connell (Semi-finals); Scott Mills and Rylan (Final)	BBC Radio Merseyside	Paddy O'Connell (Semi-finals); Claire Sweeney and Paul Quinn (Final)	Catherine Tate	
2024	BBC One	Scott Mills and Rylan Clark (Semi-finals); Graham Norton (Final)	BBC Radio 2	Richie Anderson (Semi-finals); Scott Mills and Rylan Clark (Final)	BBC Red Button	British Sign Language interpreters	Joanna Lumley	
2025	BBC One	Scott Mills and Rylan Clark (Semi-finals); Graham Norton (Final)	BBC Radio 2	Richie Anderson and Sara Cox (Semi-finals); Scott Mills and Rylan Clark (Final)	BBC Red Button	British Sign Language interpreters	Sophie Ellis-Bextor	
2026	BBC One	Angela Scanlon and Rylan Clark (Semi-finals); Graham Norton (Final)	BBC Radio 2	Sara Cox (Semi-finals); Sara Cox and Rylan Clark (Final)	BBC Red Button	British Sign Language interpreters	La Voix	

In recent years, the dual-commentator format during the semi-finals has allowed for the broadcaster to incorporate additional segments, interviews and live viewer interaction during the programme's live airing.

In February 2019, the BBC launched Eurovision Calling, a weekly BBC Sounds podcast hosted by Mills and comedian Jayde Adams. In January 2023, the BBC launched Eurovisioncast, a weekly podcast produced by the BBC News podcast team ahead of the 2023 contest in Liverpool, hosted by Måns Zelmerlöw, Nina Warhurst, BBC News Eurovision reporter Daniel Rosney and BBC Radio Merseyside presenter Ngunan Adamu, and broadcast on BBC Radio 5 Live and BBC Radio Merseyside.

On 20 January 2022, it was announced that the BBC would move its coverage of the contest from London to Salford. This therefore meant that spokespersons in contests from 2022 onwards would announce the points of the British national jury live from Dock10 in Salford. The 2023 spokesperson, Catherine Tate, was based in the host venue Liverpool Arena, and in 2024 and 2025, the background of the British voting presentation was reverted to London's Tower Bridge (despite still broadcasting from Salford). Additionally, the spokesperson in 2025, Sophie Ellis-Bextor, while announcing the British points, said "This is London calling" instead of Salford. In 2026, the background of the British voting presentation showed Salford again.

== Separate entrants ==
The Scottish National Party (SNP) has campaigned for Scotland to take part in the Eurovision Song Contest separately; however, these efforts have been rejected due to Scotland being represented by the BBC as part of the United Kingdom.

On 11 February 2008, the EBU stated that a Scottish broadcaster could apply for EBU membership, but under the current rules could not enter the contest due to the BBC's exclusive rights to represent the entire United Kingdom. It was announced in late May 2008 that the UK would be participating in the 2009 contest and, therefore, Scotland was not represented in 2009 as a separate entrant.

Scotland could be represented by STV, ITV Border or BBC Scotland. MEP Alyn Smith has said in the European Parliament: "Other small countries have done it [entered the competition] and I will be happy to help any of the broadcasting companies through the progress."

If Scotland were to participate, it is unknown whether or not England, Wales, and Northern Ireland would show any interest in entering the contest independently as well, although S4C (the Welsh language media channel) has expressed an interest and, in addition, already holds a yearly national song contest called Cân i Gymru (Song for Wales). S4C also considered a bid for the Junior Eurovision Song Contest 2008 but decided not to go ahead. Wales eventually made its Junior Eurovision debut in 2018. In 2009, MEP for Wales Jillian Evans stated her interest in securing Wales a place in the Eurovision Song Contest 2010. Wales could be represented by either BBC Cymru Wales, ITV Wales & West or S4C. There is a small campaign in Northern Ireland for a separate entrant and it could be represented by UTV or BBC Northern Ireland. There are no current plans for England to enter separately.

However, to date, these proposed changes have not occurred, and the United Kingdom still participates in the Eurovision Song Contest as a single entrant. In the run-up to the 2014 Scottish independence referendum, it was unknown what would happen if Scotland were to become an independent country. On 25 November 2013, the Scottish government released a referendum blueprint, which detailed plans for the transfer of BBC Scotland into a Scottish Broadcasting Service (SBS) and EBU membership, as well as participation in competitions, including Scottish entries in the Eurovision Song Contest. However, the referendum result on 18 September 2014 was to remain part of the UK, and the aforementioned BBC retains exclusive rights to represent the UK, including Scotland.

Since 2006, Gibraltar has been attempting to gain EBU membership through broadcaster Gibraltar Broadcasting Corporation (GBC) and thus participate independently in the Eurovision Song Contest. However, GBC cannot obtain EBU membership due to the British Overseas Territories not being independent from the UK. Gibraltar broadcast the final of the contest from 2006 to 2008.

== Photo gallery ==
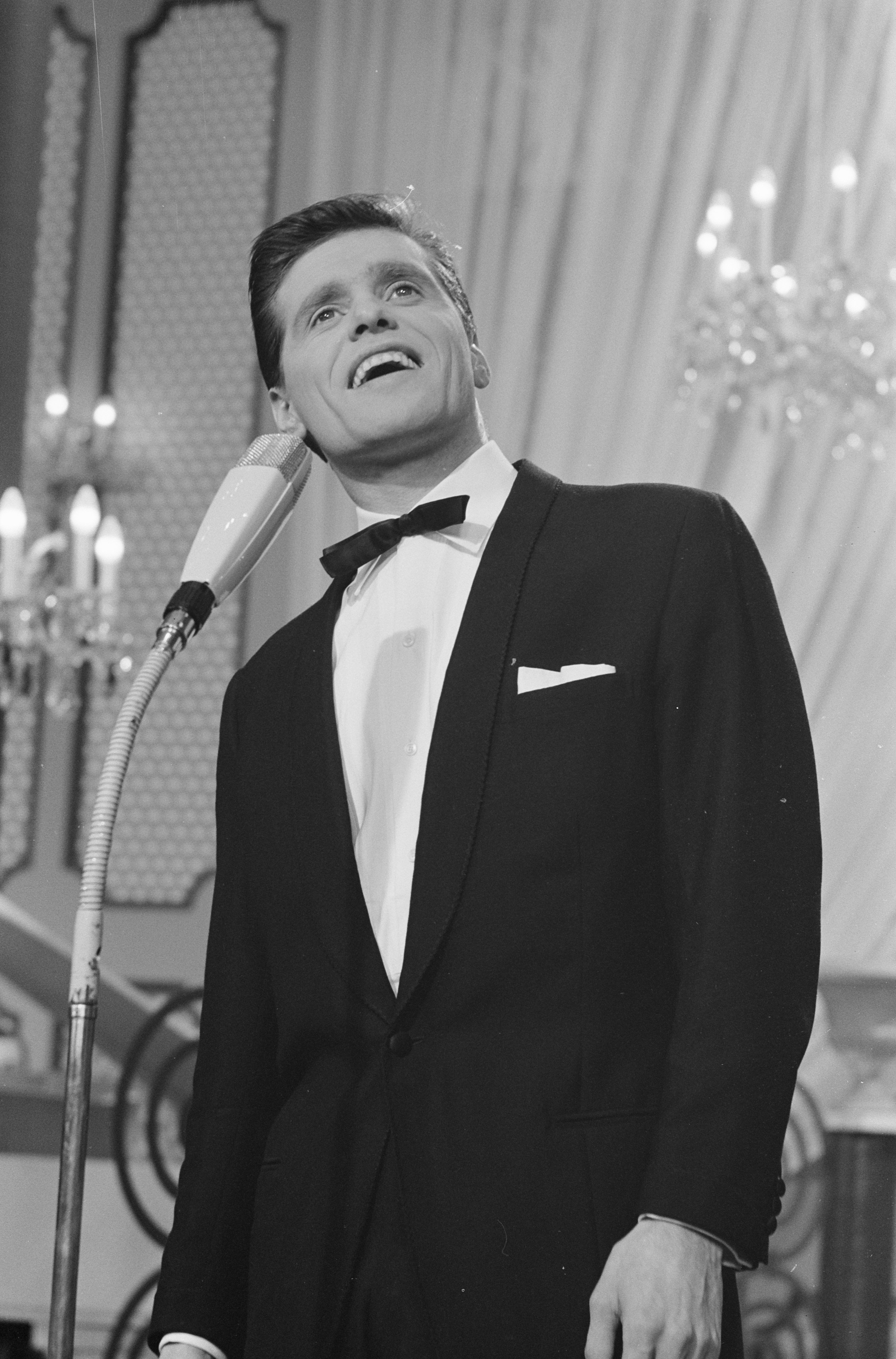
Ronnie Carroll in Luxembourg (1962)

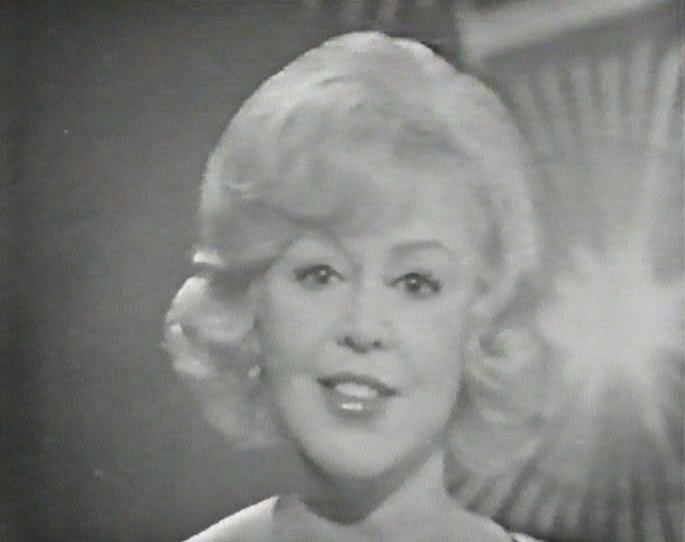
Kathy Kirby in Naples (1965)

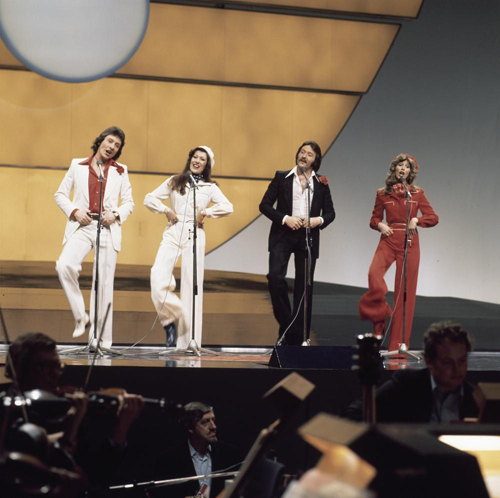
Brotherhood of Man in The Hague (1976)

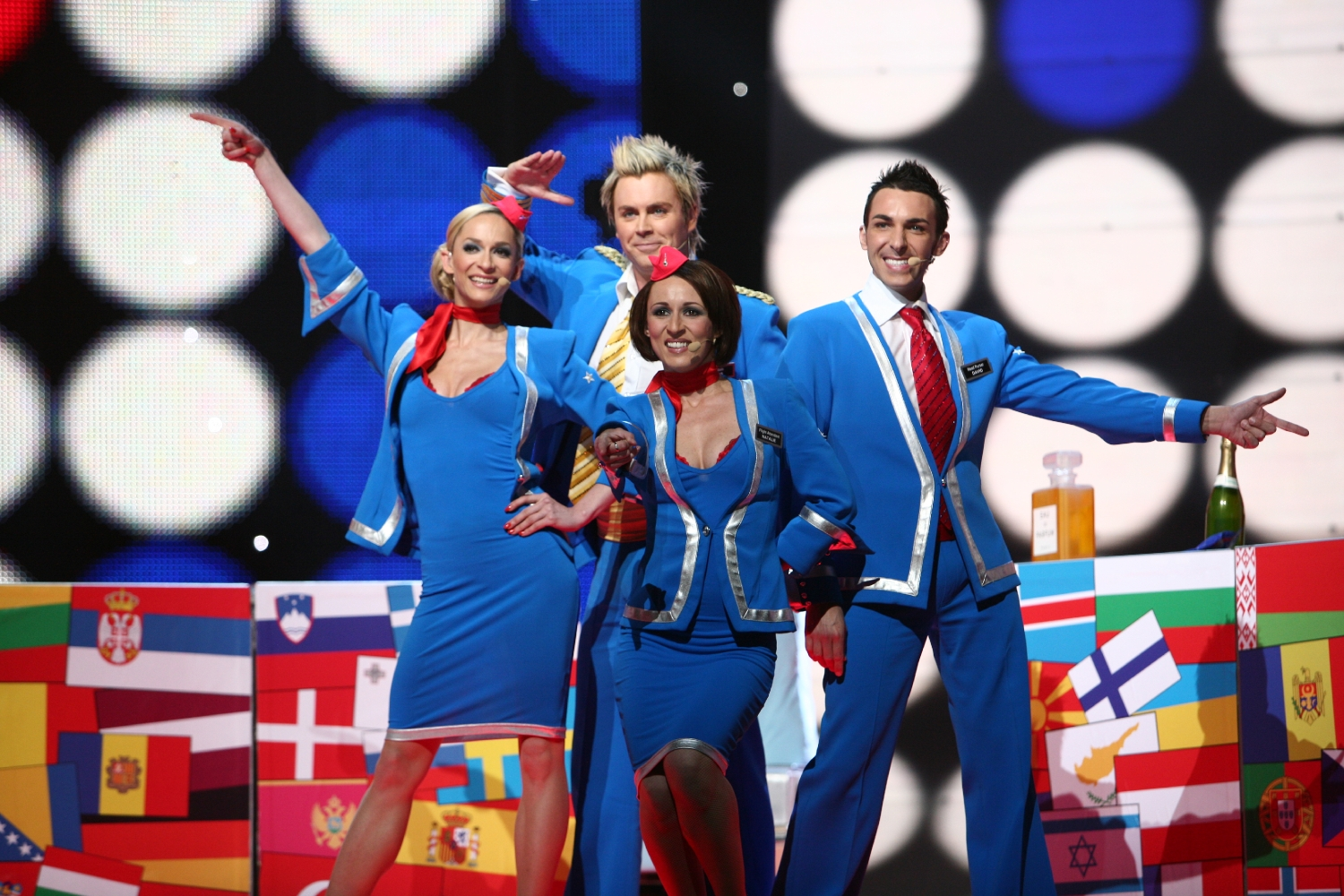
Scooch in Helsinki (2007)

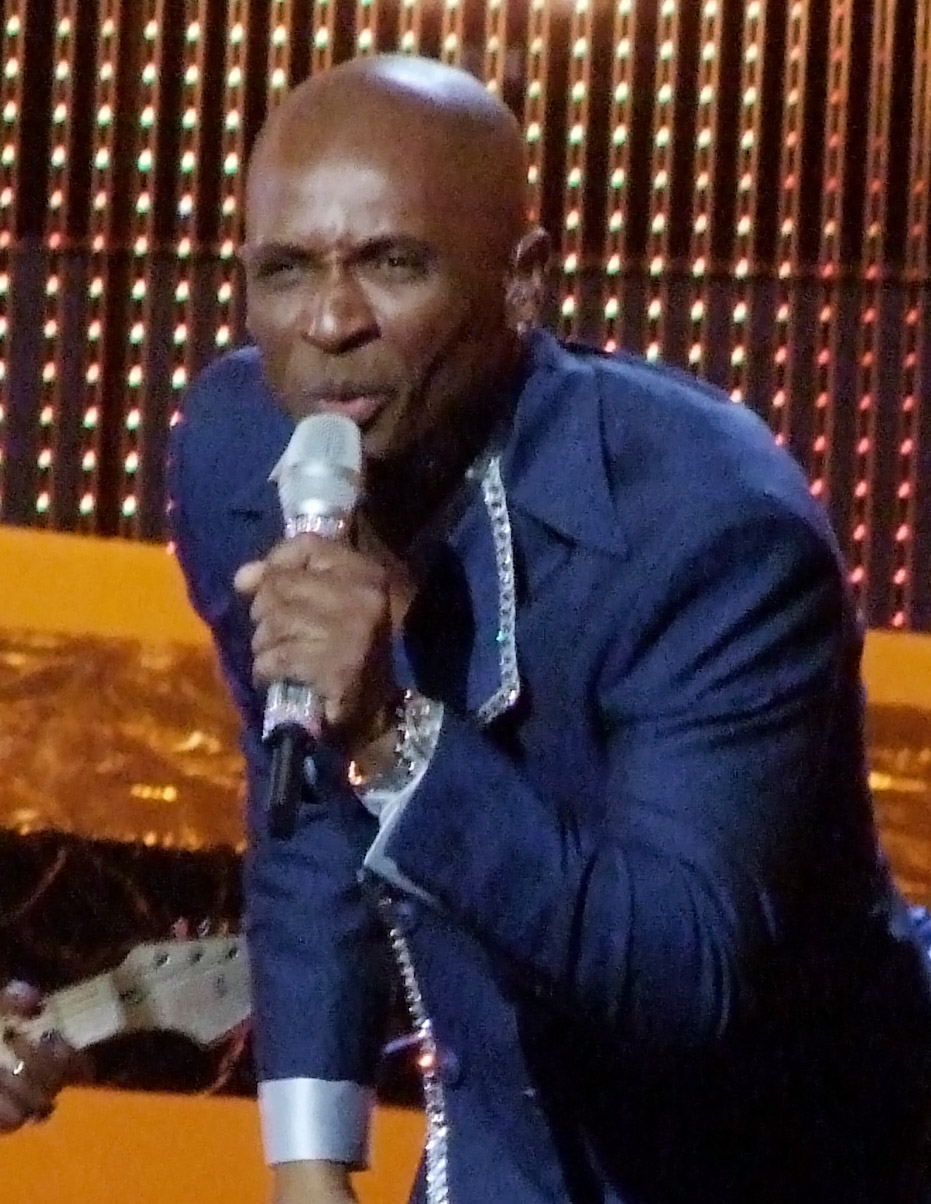
Andy Abraham in Belgrade (2008)

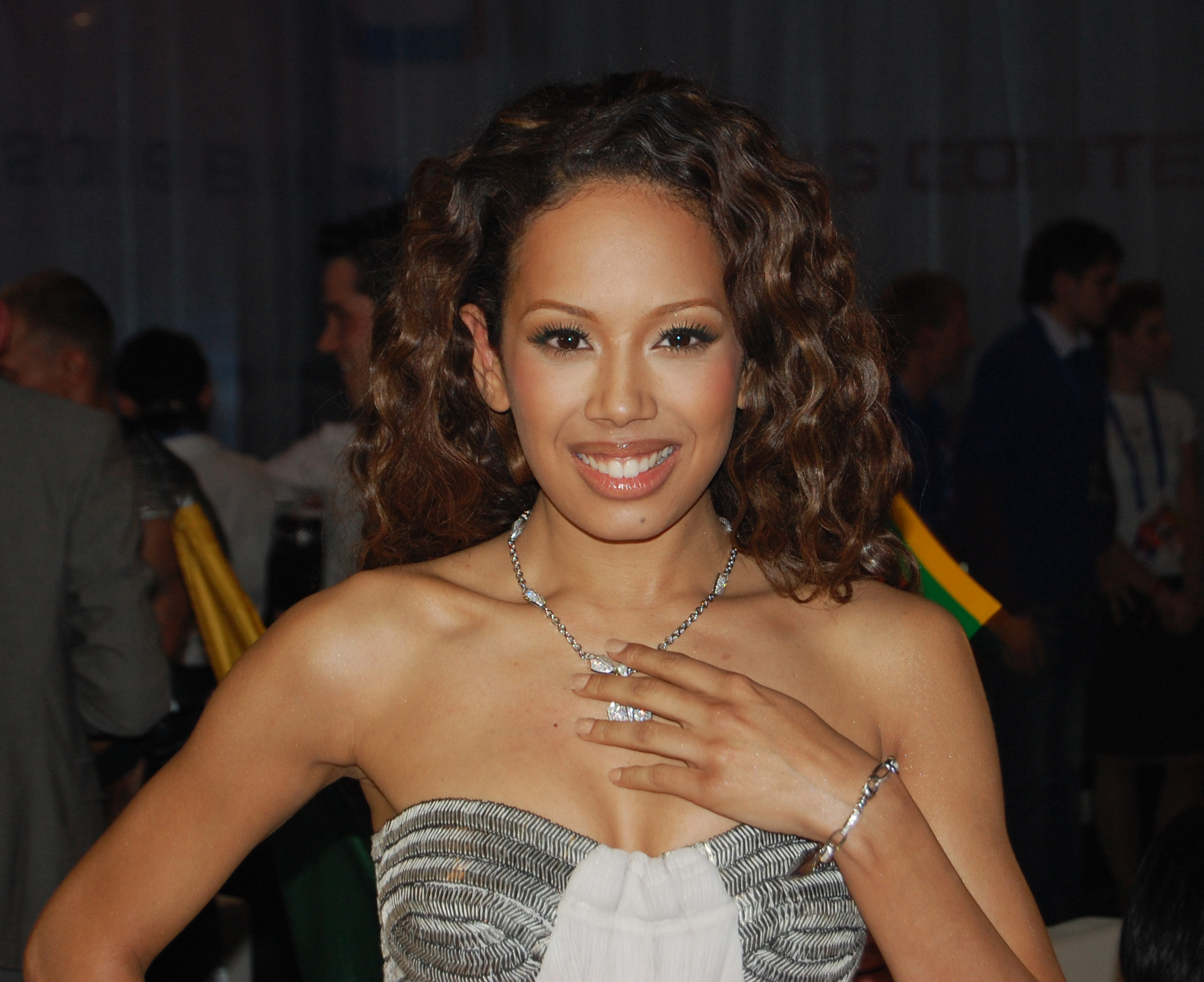
Jade Ewen in Moscow (2009)

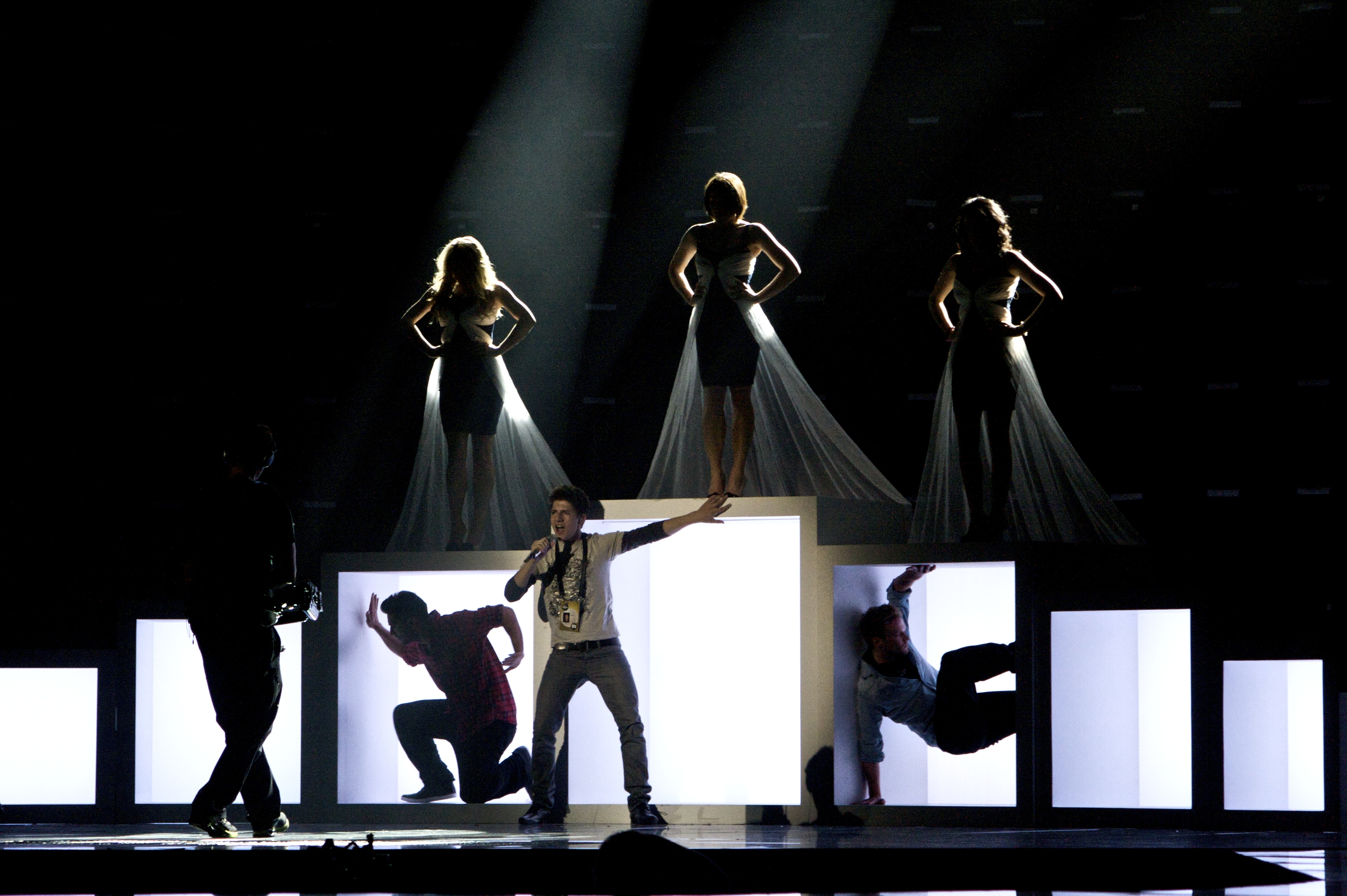
Josh Dubovie in Oslo (2010)

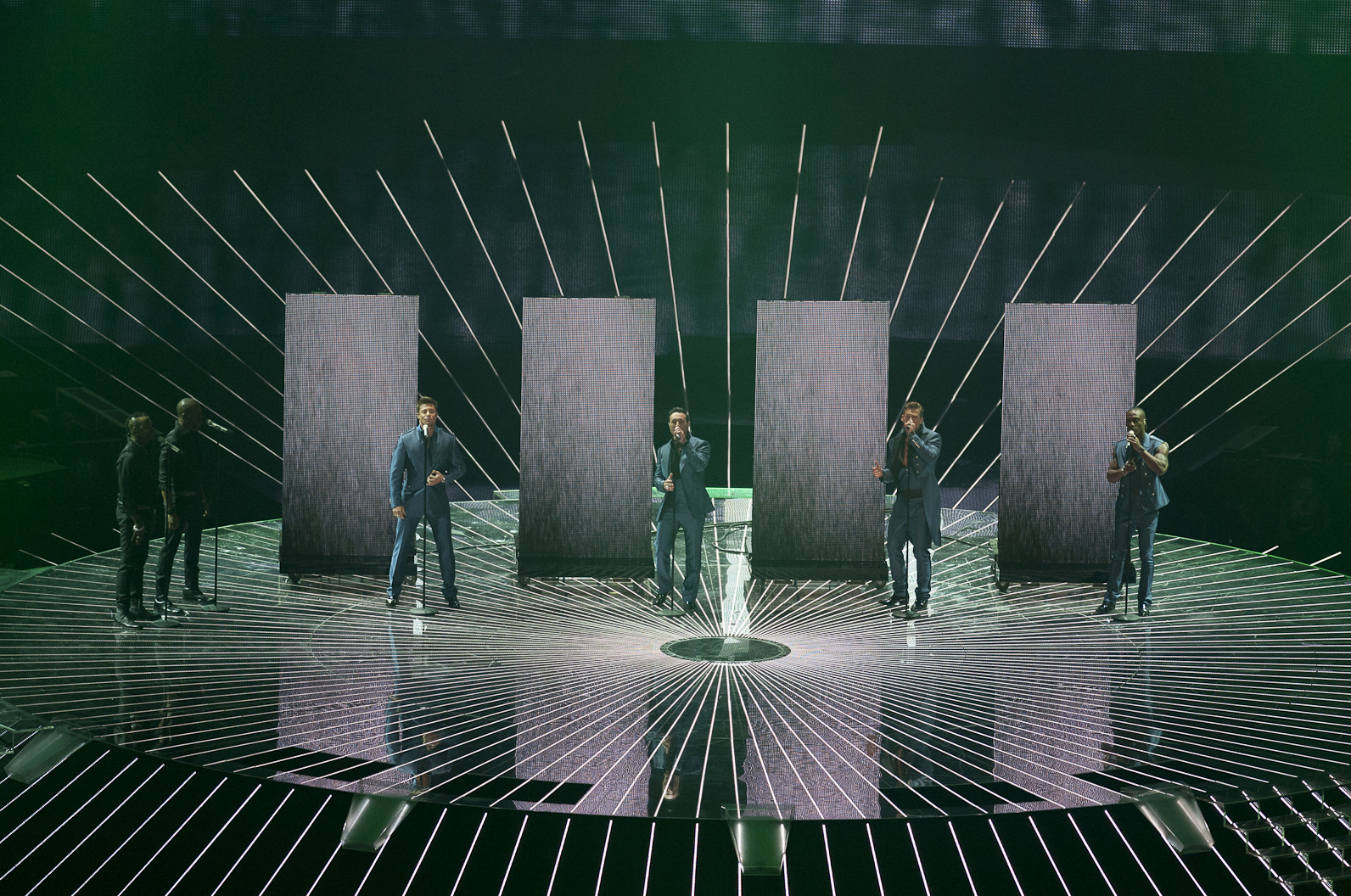
Blue in Düsseldorf (2011)

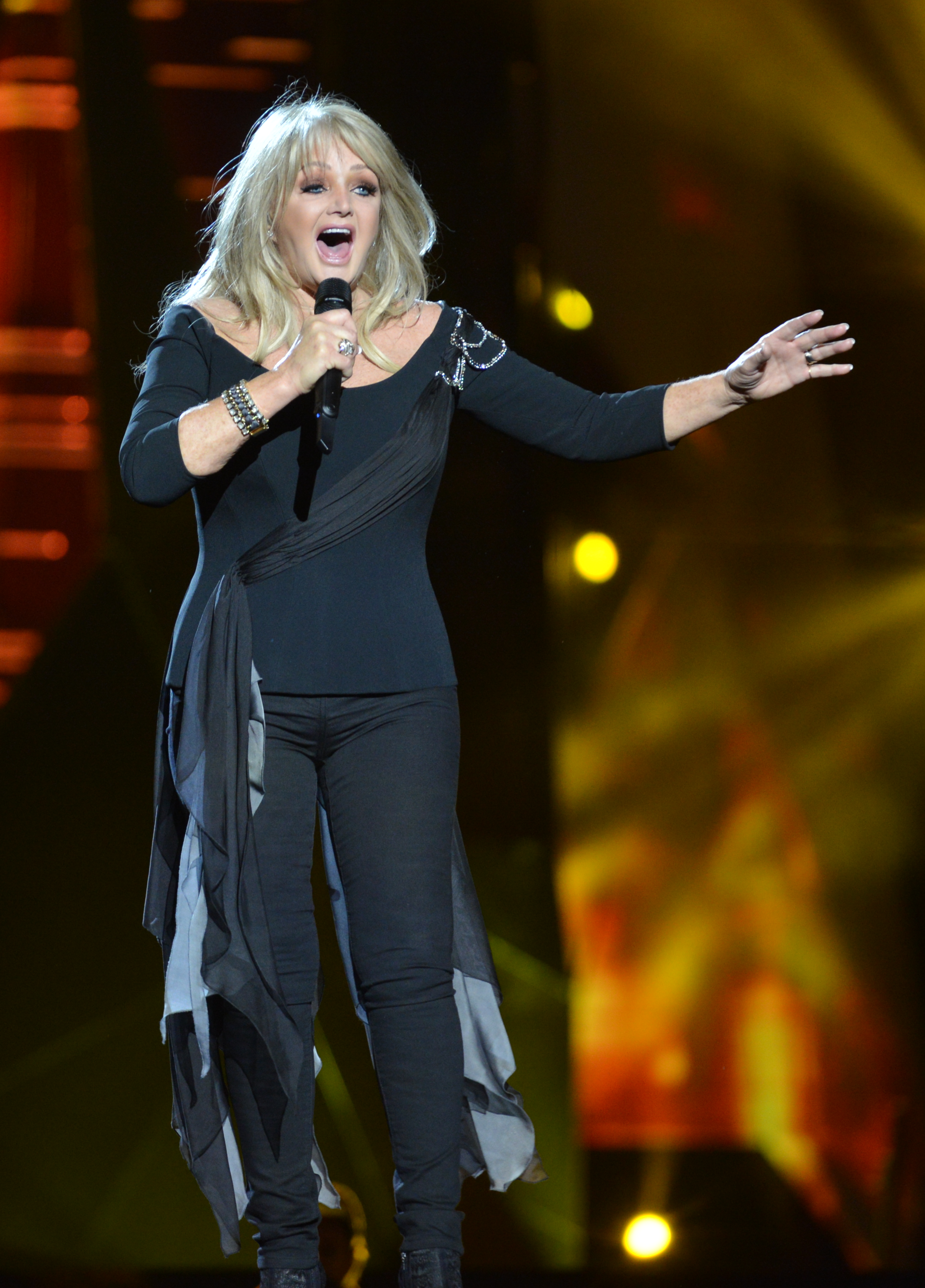
Bonnie Tyler in Malmö (2013)

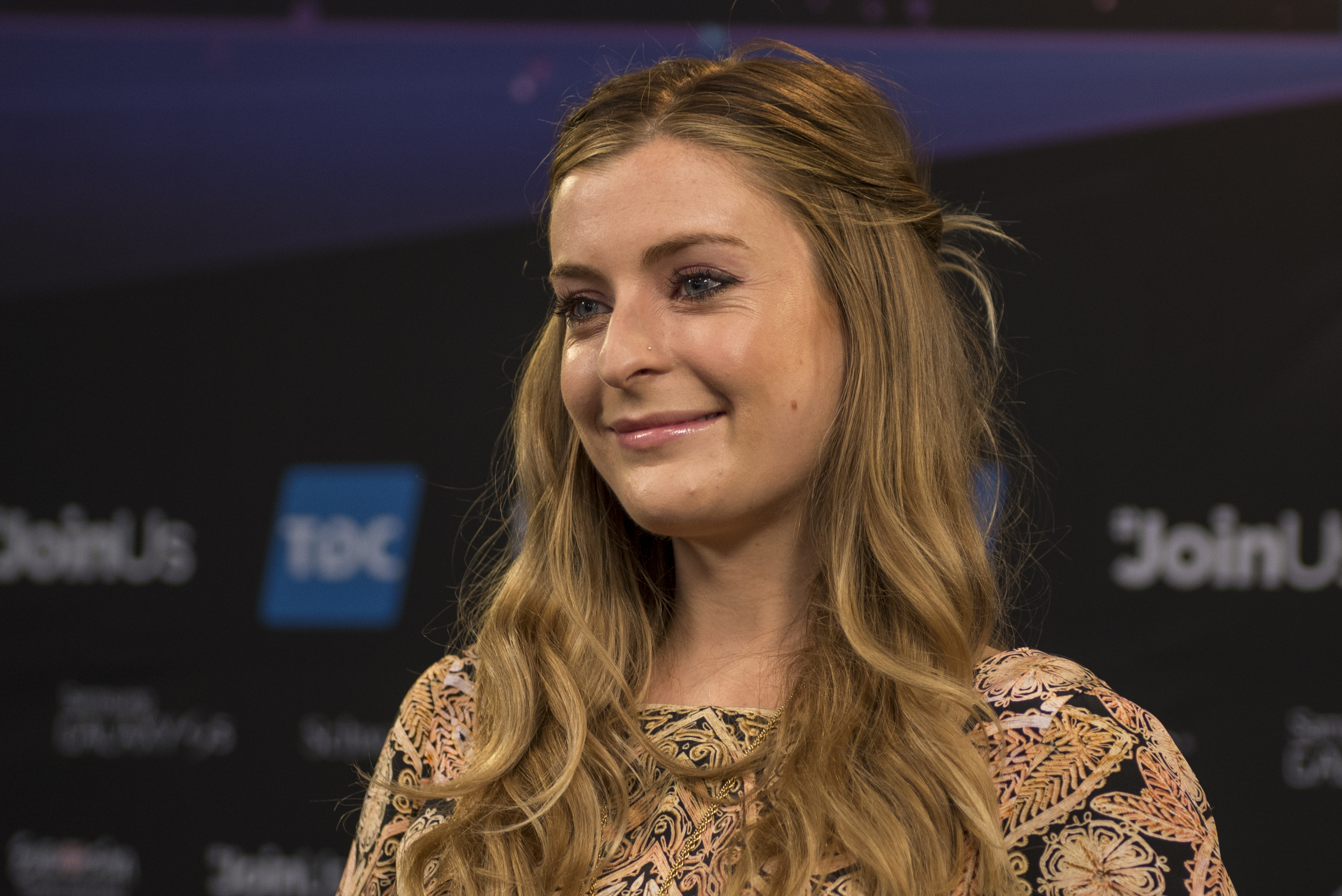
Molly in Copenhagen (2014)

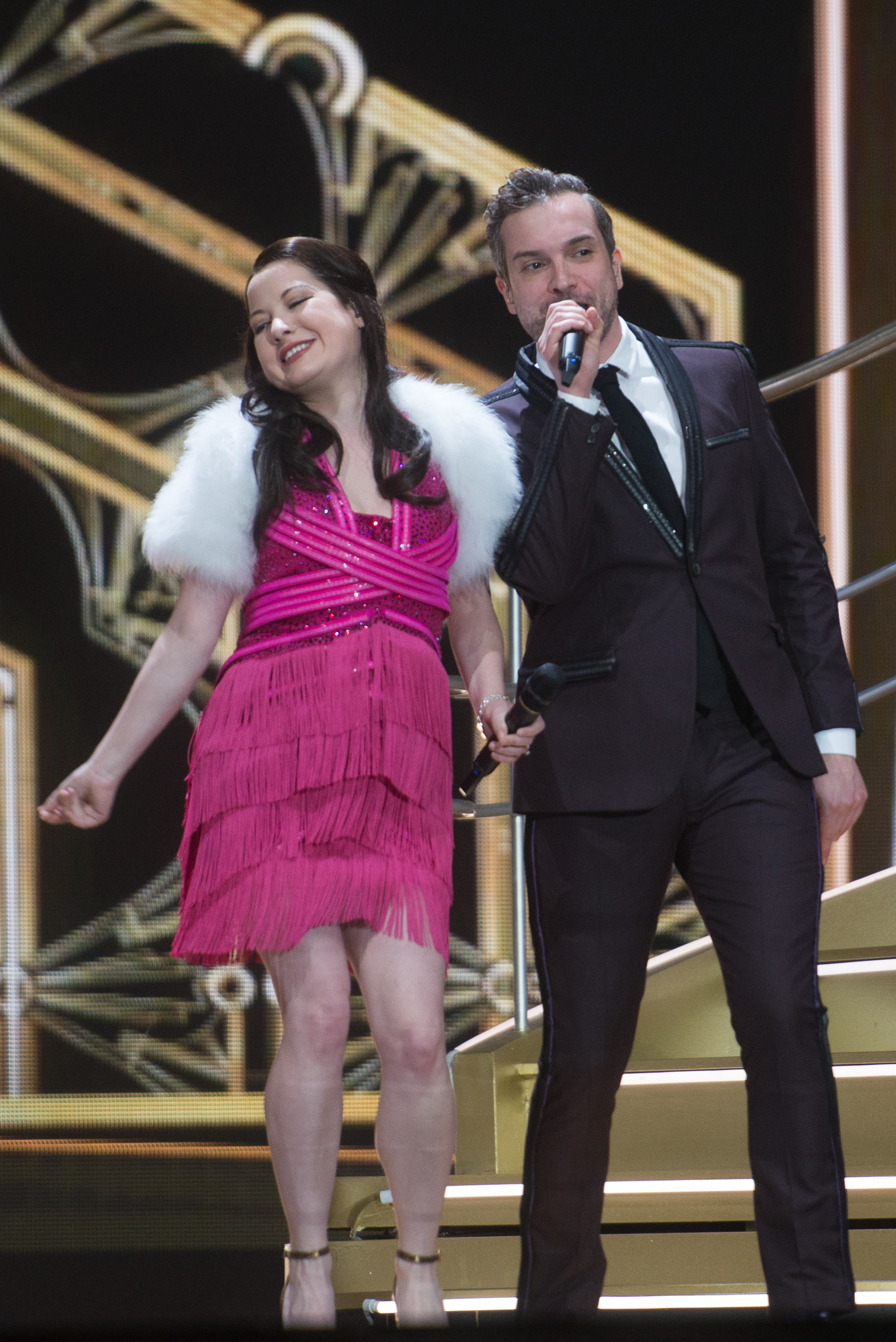
Electro Velvet in Vienna (2015)

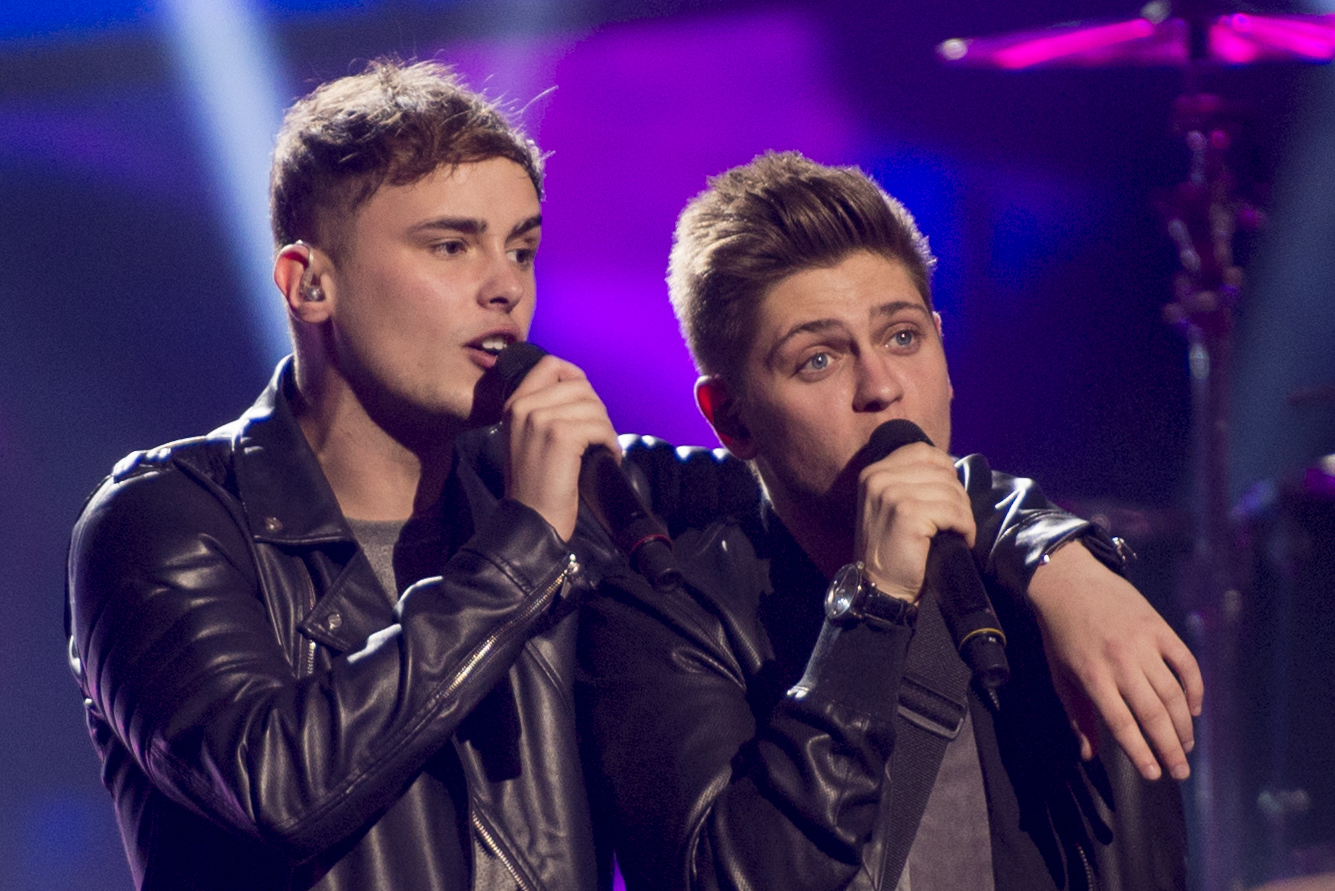
Joe and Jake in Stockholm (2016)

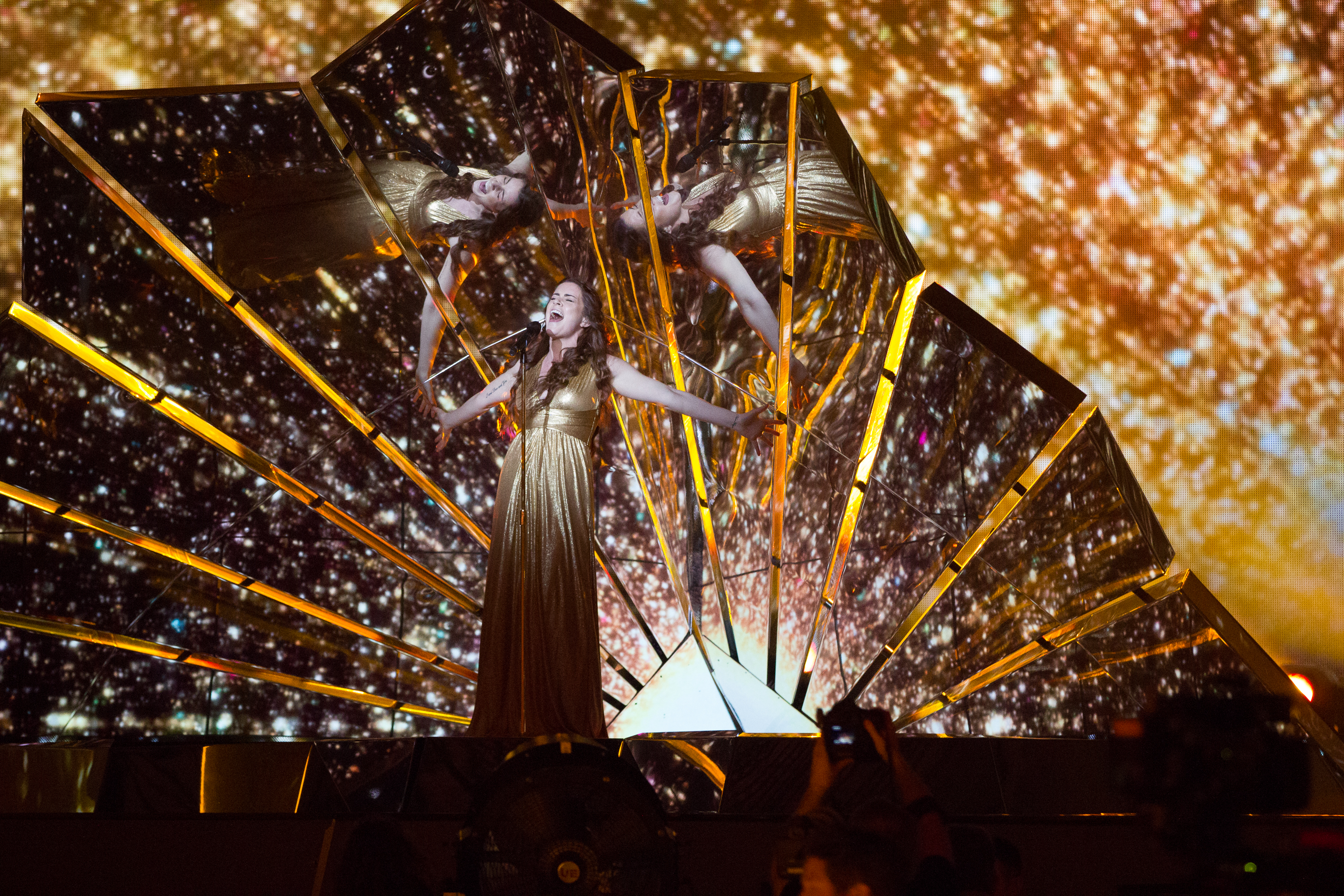
Lucie Jones in Kyiv (2017)

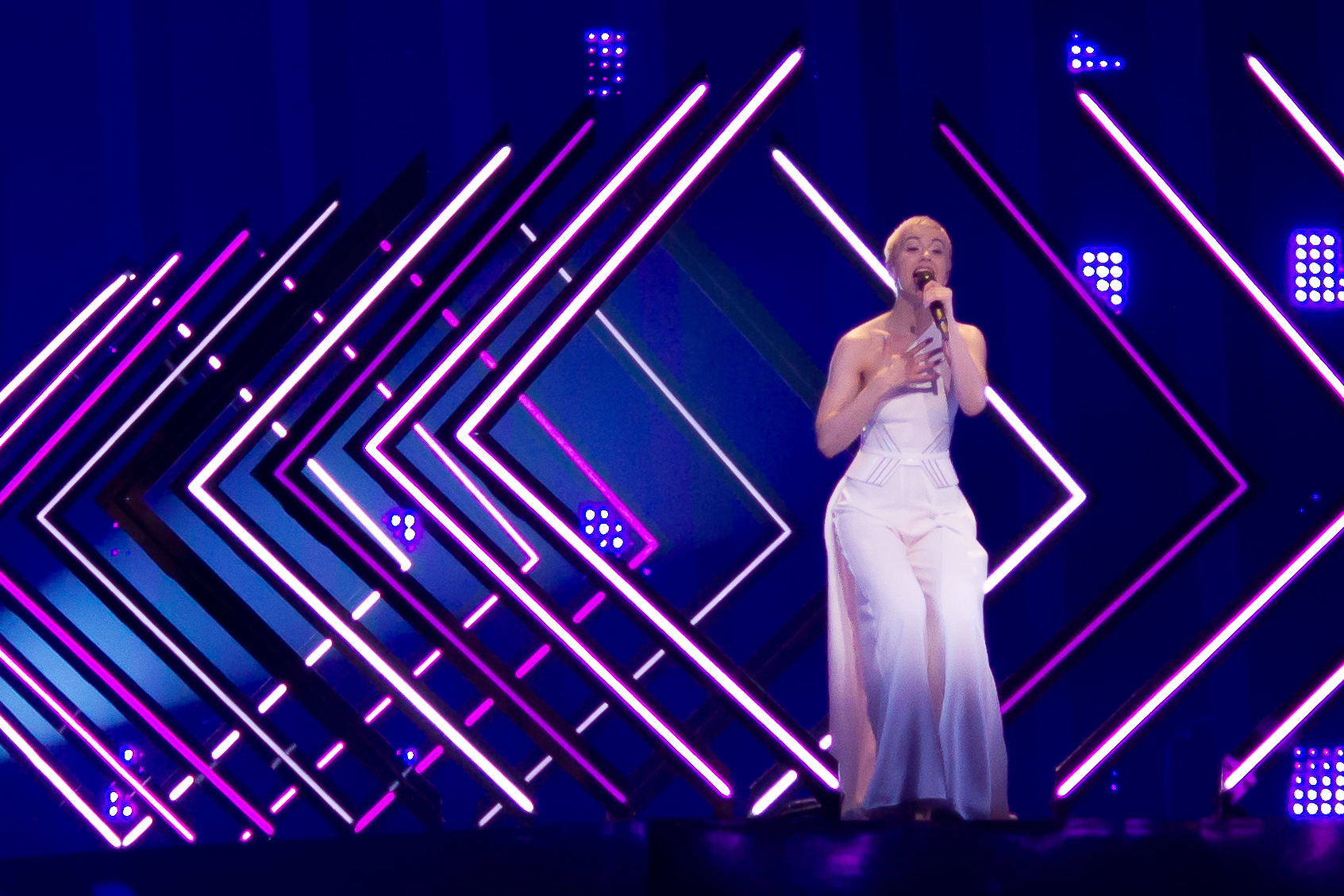
SuRie in Lisbon (2018)

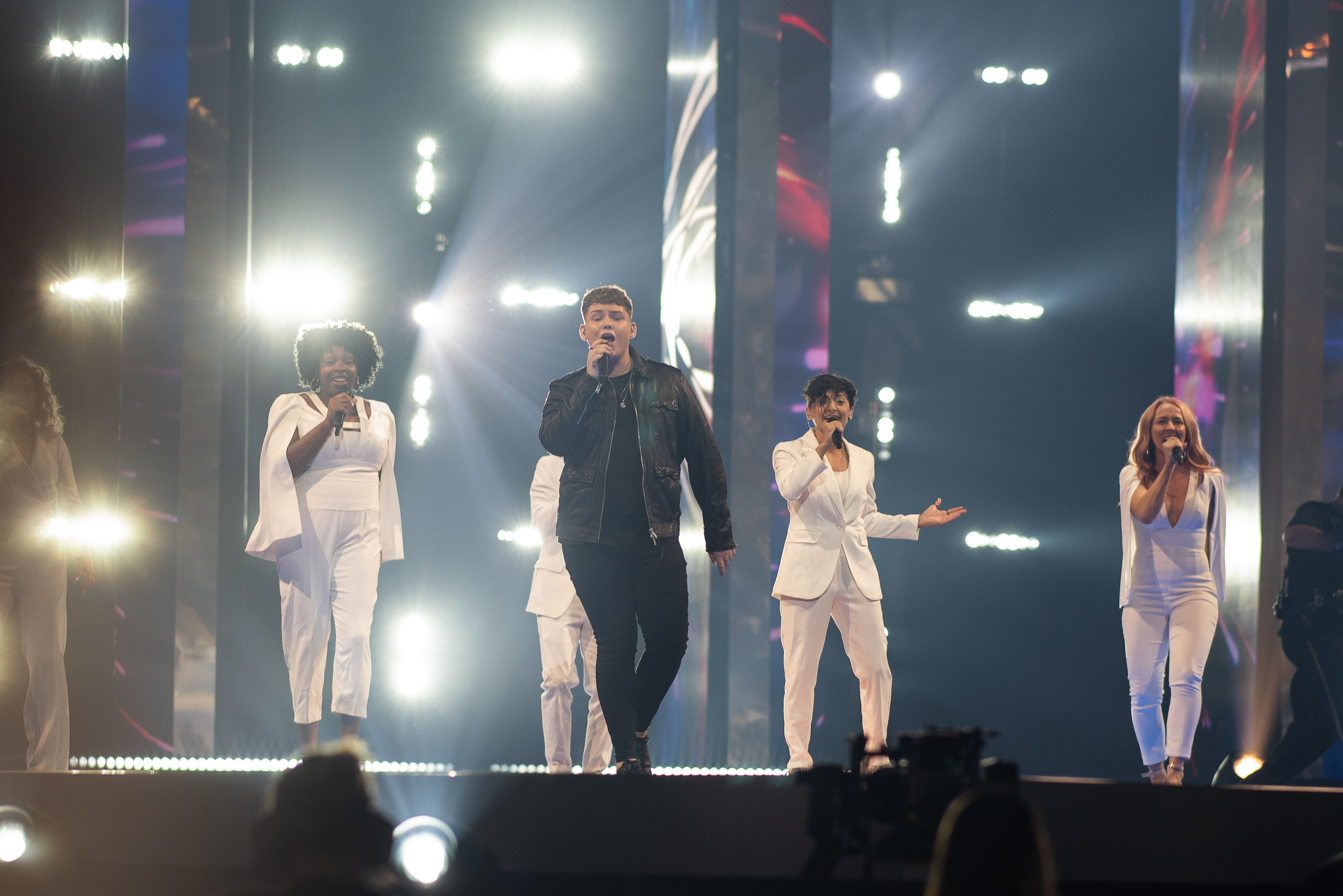
Michael Rice in Tel Aviv (2019)

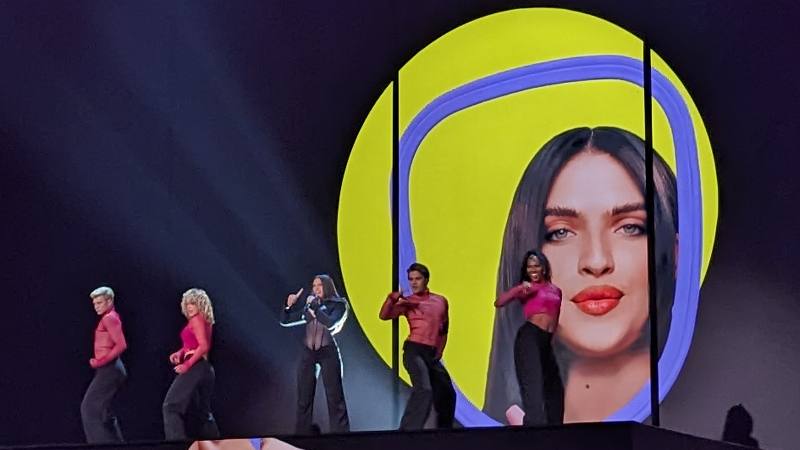
Mae Muller in Liverpool (2023)

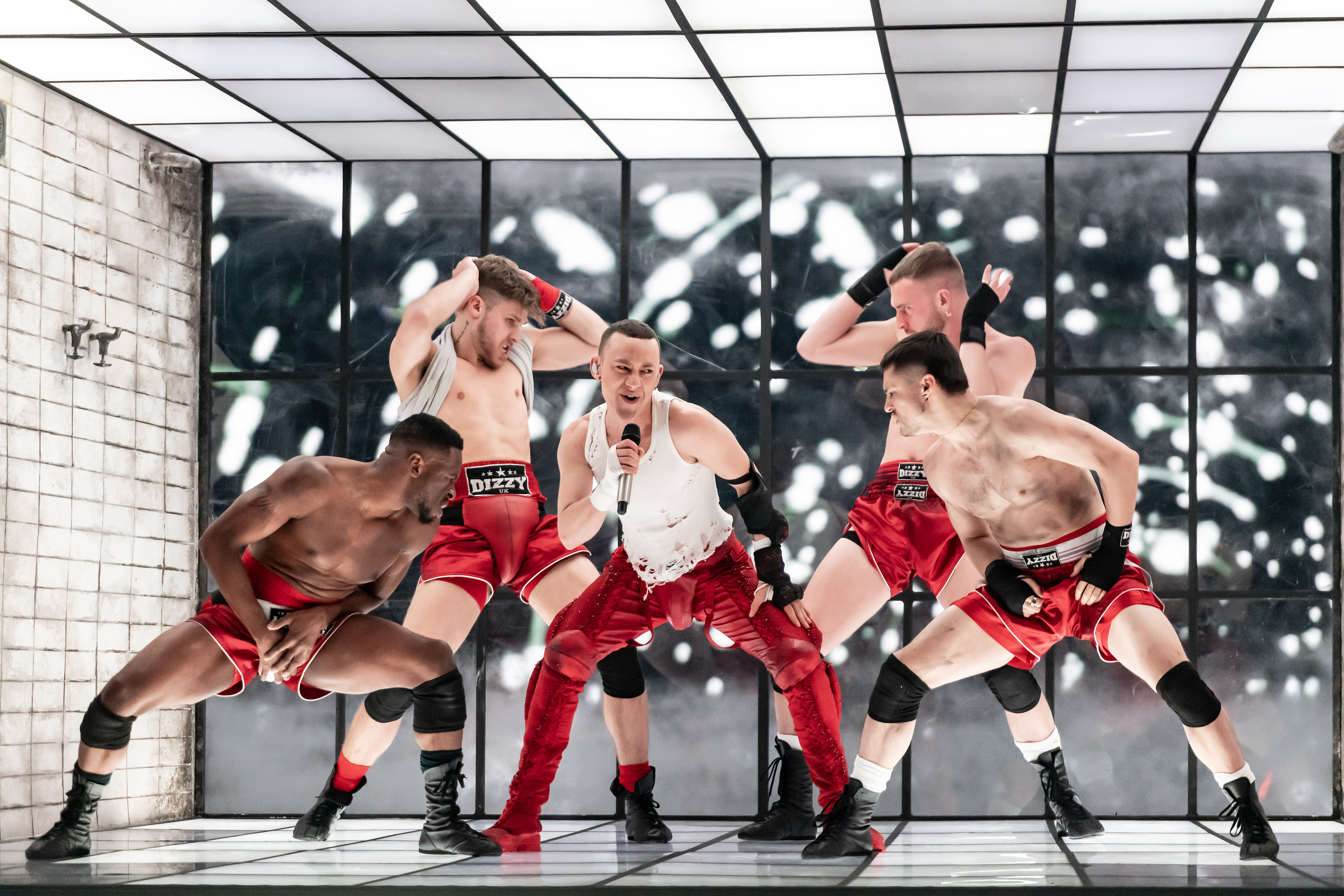
Olly Alexander in Malmö (2024)

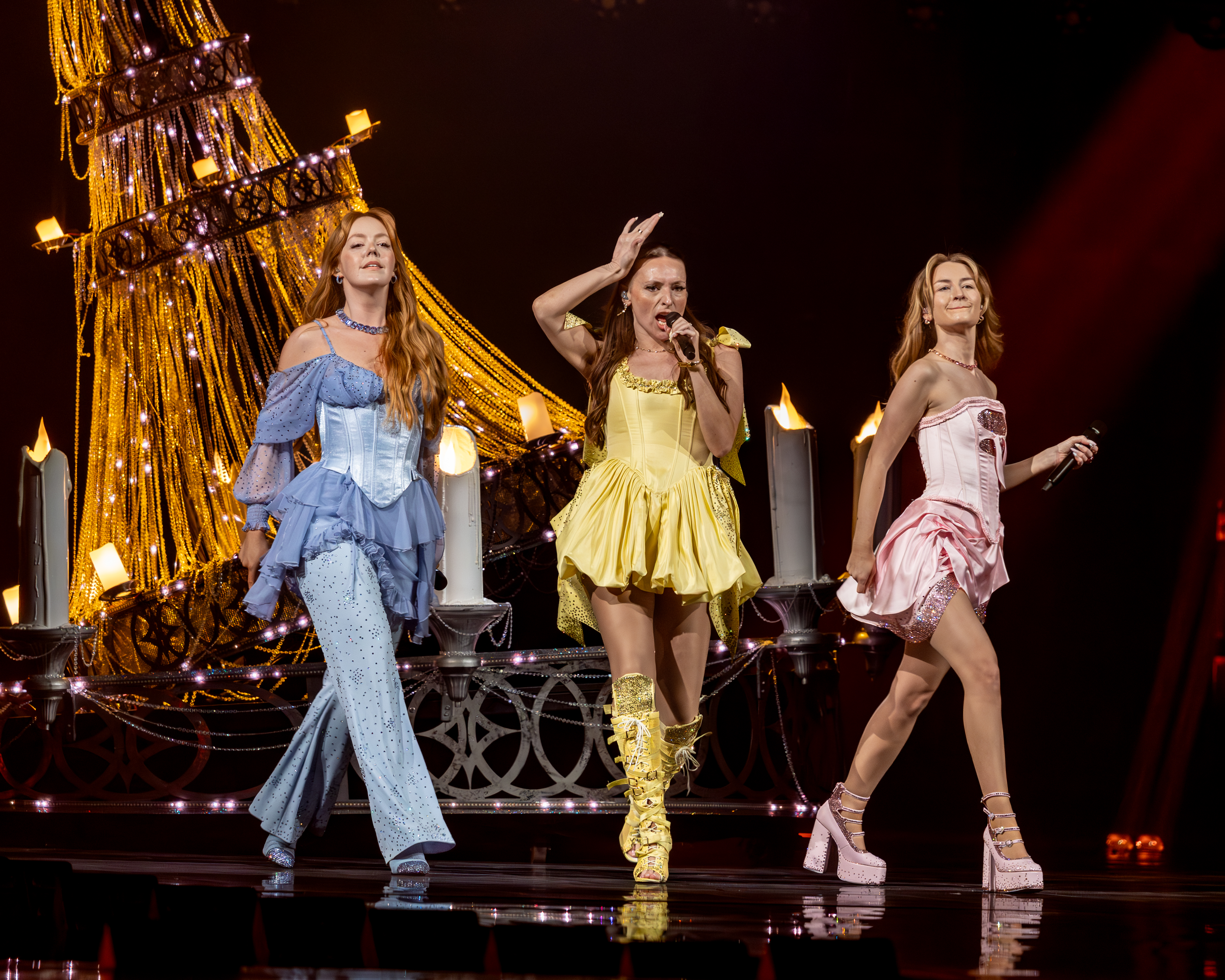
Remember Monday in Basel (2025)

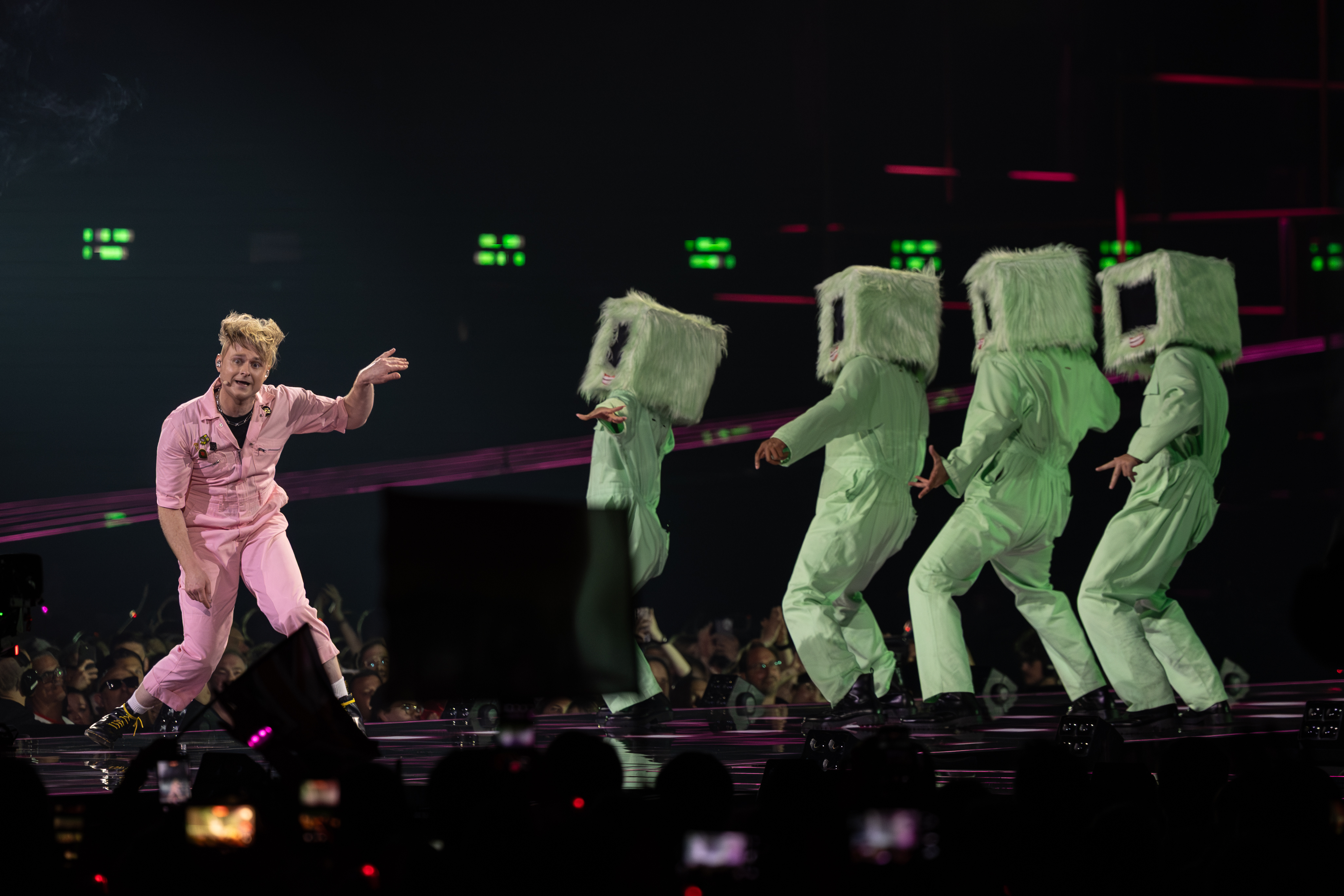
Look Mum No Computer in Vienna (2026)

== See also ==
- UK national selection for the Eurovision Song Contest
- United Kingdom in the Junior Eurovision Song Contest
- Scotland in the Eurovision Song Contest
- Wales in the Eurovision Song Contest
- Gibraltar in the Eurovision Song Contest

== Notes and references ==
=== Bibliography ===
- Roxburgh, Gordon (2020). Songs for Europe: The United Kingdom at the Eurovision Song Contest. Vol. Four: The 1990s. Prestatyn, United Kingdom: Telos Publishing. ISBN 978-1-84583-163-9.
