= Nightrunner =

Nightrunner or variant may refer to:

- The Nightrunner series, a multi-part fantasy series written by Lynn Flewelling
- Nightrunner (character), a fictional character created for publisher DC Comics
- The Night Runner, a 1957 film directed by Abner Biberman
- Nightrunners of Bengal, a novel by John Masters
- Night Runner, a type of Skaven unit in Warhammer

== See also ==
- "Runner in the Night", a song performed by the sextet Ryder at the 1986 Eurovision Song Contest
