= Wakely =

Wakely is a surname. Notable people with the surname include:

- Alex Wakely (born 1988), English cricketer
- Ernie Wakely (born 1940), Canadian ice hockey player
- Jack Wakely (born 2000), English professional footballer
- Jimmy Wakely (1914–1982), American actor, songwriter, and singer
- Josh Wakely, Australian director, screenwriter, and producer
- Rex Wakely Smith (1930–2013), South African rally driver and philatelist
- Shelagh Wakely (1932–2011), British sculptor and experimental artist

== See also ==
- Wakeley (disambiguation)
- Wakeley (name)
