= Love Is (Vikki Watson song) =

1985 song by Vikki Watson

"Love Is…"

Single by Vikki
- Released: 1985
- Songwriters: James Kaleth; Vikki Watson

Eurovision Song Contest 1985 entry
- Country: United Kingdom
- Artist: Vikki Watson
- As: Vikki
- Language: English
- Composers: James Kaleth; Vikki Watson
- Lyricists: James Kaleth; Vikki Watson
- Conductor: John Coleman

Finals performance
- Final result: 4th
- Final points: 100

Entry chronology
- ◄ "Love Games" (1984)
- "Runner in the Night" (1986) ►

"Love Is…", is a song written by James Kaleth and Vikki Watson, and performed by Vikki. It represented the United Kingdom in the Eurovision Song Contest 1985.

The first female soloist to compete for UK at Eurovision since Olivia Newton-John with "Long Live Love" in 1974 and also the second female composer of a UK Eurovision entrant to sing her composition in the contest (after Lynsey de Paul), Watson won the right to perform at Gothenburg by winning the UK national final, A Song for Europe, where she was the first singer to perform. In Gothenburg, the song was performed fourteenth on the night, after Norway's Bobbysocks! with "La det swinge", and before Switzerland's Mariella Farré and Pino Gasparini with "Piano, piano". At the end of judging that evening, "Love Is…" took the fourth-place slot with 100 points. At the time, it was one of the few entries that managed to receive 100 points without receiving any 12 point allotments from any jury. It was also the UK's strongest performance since winning the 1981 contest with "Making Your Mind Up".

The song was a contemporary ballad about a man and a woman who are both too afraid to plunge head-first with their emotions into a love affair: while both of them want to be loved by the other, both of them are letting their heads rule their hearts. In the chorus, Watson sings that "love is" the product of a number of impulsive decisions, such as "taking a chance on two hearts beating as one". Watson nominally used a single chair as a prop, first sitting in it while singing the song, then circling it and abandoning it entirely by the second half of the song.

Despite the high result in Gothenburg, the song only managed to place at No. 49 on the UK Singles Chart. The b-side of the single was "Lead Me Through the Darkness"

== Charts ==
| Chart (1985) | Peak position |
|---|---|
| UK Singles Official Charts Company | 49 |

| Preceded by "Love Games" by Belle and the Devotions | United Kingdom in the Eurovision Song Contest; 1985 | Succeeded by "Runner in the Night" by Ryder |
