= Aeone =

British musician and composer (born 1959)

- Also known as: Aeone, Vikki
- Born: Aeone Victoria Watson; 1959 (age 65–66); Liss, Hampshire, England
- Occupations: Musician, singer-songwriter
- Instruments: Vocals, piano
- Years active: 1985–present
- Labels: Rincon, Angleterre
- Website: www.aeone.com

Aeone Victoria Watson (born 1959, Liss, Hampshire, England), best known by her mononym Aeone (pronounced ay-own), is a British musician and singer-songwriter, who now lives in Los Angeles, California, United States. Her music has been classified as new age, folk or world music. She has released four albums, one of which was an internet only release. She now works extensively in film and TV and has over 60 movie trailers to her credit. Early in her career, as Vikki, she represented the United Kingdom in the Eurovision Song Contest 1985 with the song "Love Is..." which came in fourth place.

== Discography ==
=== Albums ===
Year	Album	Label
1991	Window to a World	Rincon Recordings
1999	Aeone	MP3.com
1999	The Celtic Tales	MP3.com
1999	The Woman's Touch	Angleterre Records
2002	Point of Faith	Angleterre Records
2007	The Blessing	Angleterre Records

Preceded by Belle and the Devotions with "Love Games"	United Kingdom in the Eurovision Song Contest; 1985	Succeeded by Ryder with "Runner in the Night"
