= Ryder (band) =

British band

- Origin: England
- Genres: Pop
- Years active: 1986
- Past members: Maynard Williams; Dudley Phillips; Paul Robertson; Andy Ebsworth; Geoff Leach; Rob Terry

Ryder was a purpose-made pop group led by Maynard Williams whose primary purpose was to represent the United Kingdom at the Eurovision Song Contest 1986. Ryder performed the song "Runner in the Night" which was placed 7th. They were criticised in the media for being a particularly weak and unsuitable entry. The song was the first UK Eurovision entry to fail to reach the top 75 since 1964, managing a peak of only #98.

"Runner In The Night" was the only single released by the band, but Williams teamed up with the song's composers Maureen Darbyshire and Brian Wade to compose the theme song to the BBC drama series Truckers, in which he appeared. The single from the programme failed to chart.

Williams, the son of actor Bill Maynard, had previously reached the final 24 of the UK heat in 1985. He had earlier featured in the BBC's 1975 Christmas production Great Big Groovy Horse, a rock opera based on the story of the Trojan Horse shown on BBC2 starring Julie Covington, Bernard Cribbins and Paul Jones. It was later repeated on BBC1 in 1977. At the time of the band's victory in the A Song for Europe 1986 contest, Williams had just completed a lengthy run as 'Electra' in the Andrew Lloyd Webber and Richard Stilgoe stage musical Starlight Express in the original London production.

== Discography ==
=== Singles ===
List of singles, with selected chart positions
Title	Year	Peak chart positions	Album
Title	Year	UK	Album
"Runner in the Night"	1986	98	Non-album single

Preceded by Vikki with "Love Is"	United Kingdom in the Eurovision Song Contest; 1986	Succeeded by Rikki with "Only the Light"
