= Belle and the Devotions =

British pop group

- Origin: England
- Genres: Pop
- Years active: 1983–1984
- Label: CBS Records
- Past members: Kit Rolfe; Laura James; Linda Sofield

Belle and the Devotions were a British pop group. Under this name, the singer Kit Rolfe released the singles "Where Did Love Go Wrong?" and "Got to Let You Know" in 1983.

In 1984, two other members, Laura James and Linda Sofield, were added to the group in order to participate in the UK heats of the Eurovision Song Contest, A Song for Europe in 1984. "Love Games", written by Paul Curtis and Graham Sacher, proved to be an easy winner, and represented the UK at the Eurovision Song Contest 1984 in Luxembourg.

According to John Kennedy O'Connor's The Eurovision Song Contest - The Official History, the actions of English football fans in the tiny state the previous autumn caused something of a backlash against the British delegation. They were booed by some of the audience. It emerged during rehearsals that a backing trio, hidden off-camera, were doing the majority of the backing singing, while the microphones of Sofeld and James were not even switched on. "Love Games" finished in seventh place, and reached #11 in the UK Singles Chart. The group followed up this single with "All the Way Up", released in July 1984. It failed to chart and the threesome split up soon after.

Kit Rolfe had been involved in Eurovision before, as a backing singer for Sweet Dreams in Munich in 1983, when she herself was hidden off-camera. She performed the same task for Samantha Janus in 1991, teaming up with Hazell Dean to provide backing vocals in Rome.

Rolfe also later recorded a single with Eddie "The Eagle" Edwards, "Fly Eddie Fly". The song was not a hit.

== Discography ==
=== Singles ===
Year	Song	UK
1983	"Got to Let You Know"	—
1983	"Where Did Love Go Wrong?"	—
1984	"Love Games"	11
1984	"All the Way Up"	—
"—" denotes releases that did not chart.

Preceded by Sweet Dreams with "I'm Never Giving Up"	United Kingdom in the Eurovision Song Contest; 1984	Succeeded by Vikki with "Love Is"
