= Wakeley baronets =

Baronetcy in the Baronetage of the United Kingdom

The Wakeley Baronetcy, of Liss in the County of Southampton, is a title in the Baronetage of the United Kingdom. It was created on 30 June 1952 for Cecil Wakeley, 1st Baronet, KBE, CB (5 May 1892 – 5 June 1979), President of the Royal College of Surgeons. He married Elizabeth Muriel Nicholson-Smith. Their eldest son, John Wakeley (1926–2012), who married June Leney, daughter of Donald Frank Leney, became second baronet in 1979. The title is now held by their eldest son, Sir Nicholas Wakeley, 3rd baronet, married to Sarah Ann Robinson. Sarah Ann Robinson is the daughter of Air Vice Marshal Brian Lewis Robinson.

John Wakeley's daughter is the fashion designer Amanda Wakeley.

Escutcheon of the Wakeley Baronets of Liss

== Wakeley baronets, of Liss (1952) ==
- Sir Cecil Pembry Grey Wakeley, 1st Baronet (1892–1979)
- Sir John Cecil Nicholson Wakeley, 2nd Baronet (1926–2012)
- Sir Nicholas Jeremy Wakeley, 3rd Baronet (born 1957)

The heir apparent is the present holder's son Jonathan Josiah Wakeley.

== Citations ==
- S37 BP2003 volume 3, page 4031. See link for full details for this source. Hereinafter cited as. [S37]
- S37 BP2003. [S37]

== Sources ==
- Kidd, Charles, Williamson, David (editors). Debrett's Peerage and Baronetage (1990 edition). New York: St Martin's Press, 1990.
- Leigh Rayment's list of baronets
