= Runner in the Night =

1986 song by Ryder

Single by Ryder
- Released: 1986
- Composer: Brian Wade
- Lyricist: Maureen Darbyshire

Eurovision Song Contest 1986 entry
- Country: United Kingdom
- Artists: Maynard Williams; Dudley Phillips; Paul Robertson; Andy Ebsworth; Geoff Leach; Rob Terry
- As: Ryder
- Language: English
- Composer: Brian Wade
- Lyricist: Maureen Darbyshire
- Conductor: No conductor

Finals performance
- Final result: 7th
- Final points: 72

Entry chronology
- ◄ "Love Is…" (1985)
- "Only the Light" (1987) ►

"Runner in the Night", is a song written by Maureen Darbyshire and composed by Brian Wade, and performed by the sextet Ryder, led by Maynard Williams. It represented the United Kingdom in the Eurovision Song Contest 1986.

== Song information ==
Ryder won the right to perform at Bergen by winning the UK national final, A Song for Europe, where they were the sixth act to perform. At Bergen, the song was performed fifth on the night, after Norway's Ketil Stokkan with "Romeo", and before Iceland's debut effort, "Gleðibankinn", by ICY. At the end of judging that evening, "Runner in the Night" took the seventh-place slot with 72 points.

The song was a contemporary rock offering, departing from the norm at the time in that the sextet played instruments themselves (including a set of electronic drums and keyboards) and did not use an orchestra. The song itself is about a man "running in the night" to a woman he has previously left, hoping he is not too late and that his former lover will forgive him and take him back.

== Charts ==
The song placed at No. 98, not charting on the UK Singles Chart (the Top 75 songs) but as an addenda on the "Next 25" version of the charts. This was the worst commercial showing for a UK Eurovision entry since 1964, in which the entry that year didn't chart on the Singles Chart at all.

Chart (1986)	Peak position
UK Singles Official Charts Company	98

Preceded by "Love Is …" by Vikki Watson	United Kingdom in the Eurovision Song Contest; 1986	Succeeded by "Only the Light" by Rikki
