= Wakeley (name) =

Wakeley is both a surname and a given name. Notable people with the name include:

Surname:

- Amanda Wakeley (born 1962), British fashion designer
- Cecil Wakeley (1892–1979), English surgeon
- Eleazer Wakeley (1822–1912), American politician and jurist
- Kitt Wakeley (born 1979), American musician
- Solmous Wakeley (1794–1867), American politician

Given name:

- Wakeley Gage (born 1958), English footballer
- Frank Wakeley Gunsaulus (1856–1921), American educator, pastor, and humanitarian
