= Amanda Wakeley =

British fashion designer (born 1962)

Amanda Jane Wakeley OBE (born 15 September 1962) is a British fashion designer best known for her evening and cocktail dresses and accessories, and for her “clean glam” signature style, has also developed a presence in daywear, including day-dresses, tailoring and knitwear and a line of accessories and jewellery. Sposa is the brand's bridal collection. Wakeley is an advocate for international organisation Women for Women.

== Early life ==
Wakeley is the daughter of Sir John Wakeley, 2nd Baronet (1926–2012), a prominent surgeon and former chief inspector for the City of London Special Constabulary, and his wife June, a physiotherapist.

Wakeley grew up in Cheshire, and was educated at Cheltenham Ladies College.

== Career ==
Following a spell as a fashion model in New York in the 1980s, Wakeley launched her signature line in 1990, opening a small studio and boutique in Chelsea, London, with a £20,000 loan from her father.

Patronage from Princess Diana solidified her success. Since 2009, she has built her brand and business, with substantial financial investment from AGC Equity Partners, a private equity firm based in London, in 2012.

== Stores ==
Wakeley's flagship store was located in Albemarle Street, Mayfair, London. Besides the UK, where Wakeley had concessions at Harvey Nichols throughout the country and at other leading retailers, the brand was available in more than 50 fashion and luxury retailers throughout Europe, America and the Middle East.

In September 2016, Wakeley launched an accessories brand on UK shopping channel QVC. The range, Monogram Collection, is mostly leather bags, with some smaller items such as purses and card holders.

The company went into administration in 2021 following the COVID-19 pandemic.

== Personal ==
Her first marriage was to "a much older investment banker". Aged 26, she married Neil Gillon, an Australian-born property developer, but they split in 1998, and since 2005 she has been in a relationship with businessman Hugh Morrison, with whom she bought back her label for £1 million in 2009.

Wakeley was appointed an OBE in 2010 for her services to the fashion industry, and is also the winner of numerous awards, including three British Fashion Awards. Since 1996, she has co-chaired the committee for the Fashion Targets Breast Cancer appeal leading the efforts to raise substantial funds to support the charity.
