= Delusional (Remember Monday song) =

2026 single by Remember Monday

Single by Remember Monday

from the album Can We Press Rewind
- Released: 22 May 2026
- Genre: Pop rock
- Length: 3:22
- Label: Nothing Nice to Say
- Songwriters: Lauren Byrne; Holly-Anne Hull; Kaity Rae; Danny Jones; Dougie Poynter; Steven Battelle
- Producers: Kaity Rae; Sidequest

Remember Monday singles chronology
"More Than Ever" (2025)	"Delusional" (2026)	"Attention" (2026)

"Delusional" is a song recorded by British girl group Remember Monday. It was released on 22 May 2026 through their label, Nothing Nice to Say. Their first musical release of 2026, it follows them representing the UK for the Eurovision Song Contest in 2025. That same year, they were announced as openers for British band McFly. It was reported that they had become friends with members Danny Jones and Dougie Poynter and had made two songs together, with "Delusional" being one of them. Jones and Poynter, as Sidequest, co-produced the song with Kaity Rae.

The lyrical content of "Delusional" is centered around a character who feels love at first sight and begins planning a full future with a man who barely knows she exists. A sonic shift for the group, it has been described as a pop rock song. Remember Monday have stated that their goal with "Delusional" and further upcoming releases is to emulate music featured in romcom films from the 1990s and 2000s. The track was praised by critics who felt that their shift in genre felt authentic, as well as being a "defining" song for the group.

== Background and release ==
Remember Monday formed in 2013 whilst attending Sixth Form College, Farnborough together. In 2019, they competed on the eighth series of The Voice UK, during which they were mentored by Jennifer Hudson. Then, in 2025, they were selected to represent the UK for the Eurovision Song Contest 2025. They competed with the song "What the Hell Just Happened?" and finished in tenth with the juries and 19th overall in the contest. Following the contest, they released singles "Happier" and "More Than Ever", as well as being the support act for McFly's UK tour. They then took a break from releasing music to focus on writing new material, returning with "Delusional", released on 22 May 2026. In promotion of "Delusional", Remember Monday performed it on the CBBC entertainment programme Blue Peter. They also earned and sported a Blue Peter badge whilst appearing on the series.

== Composition and lyrics ==
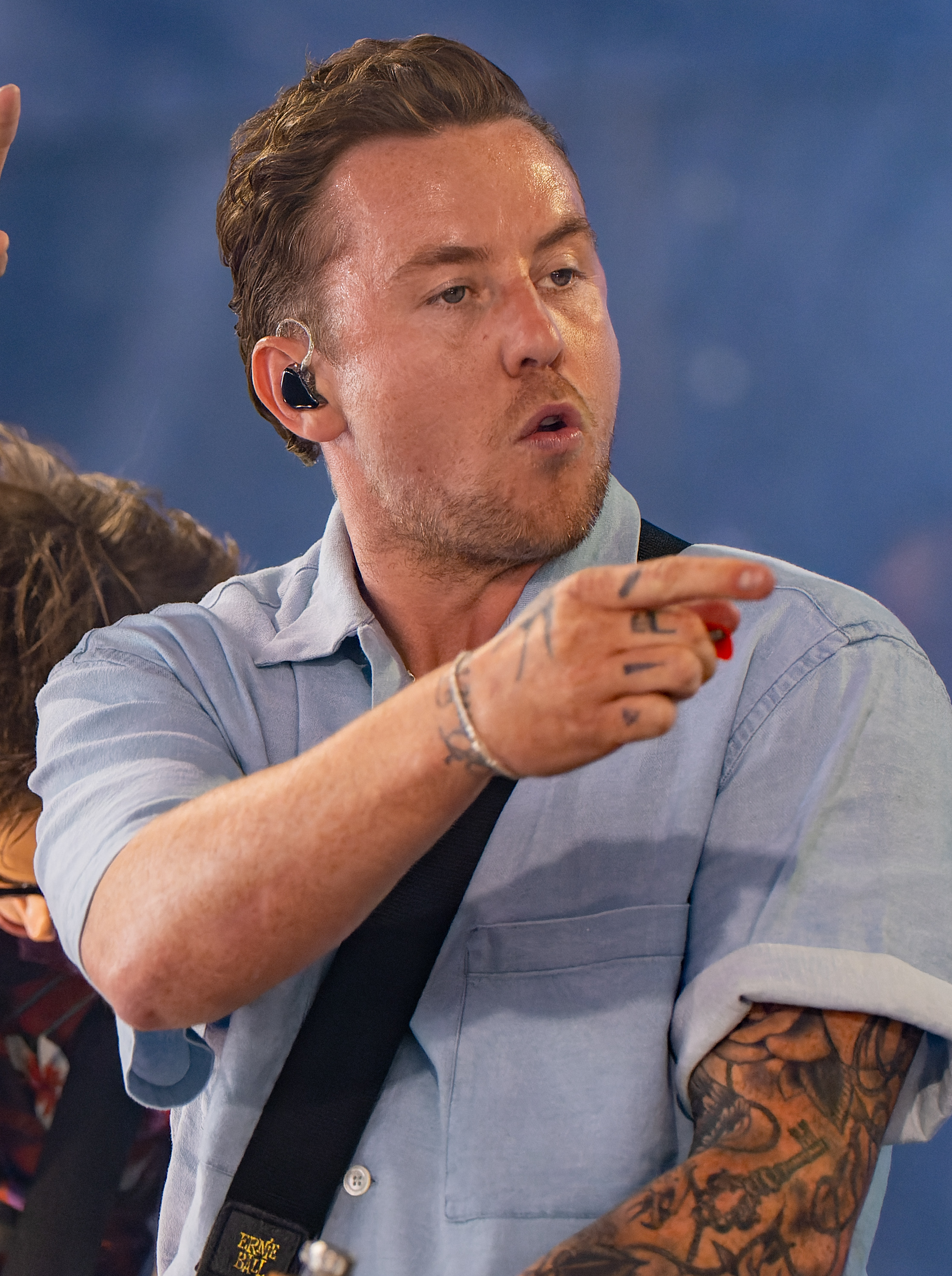
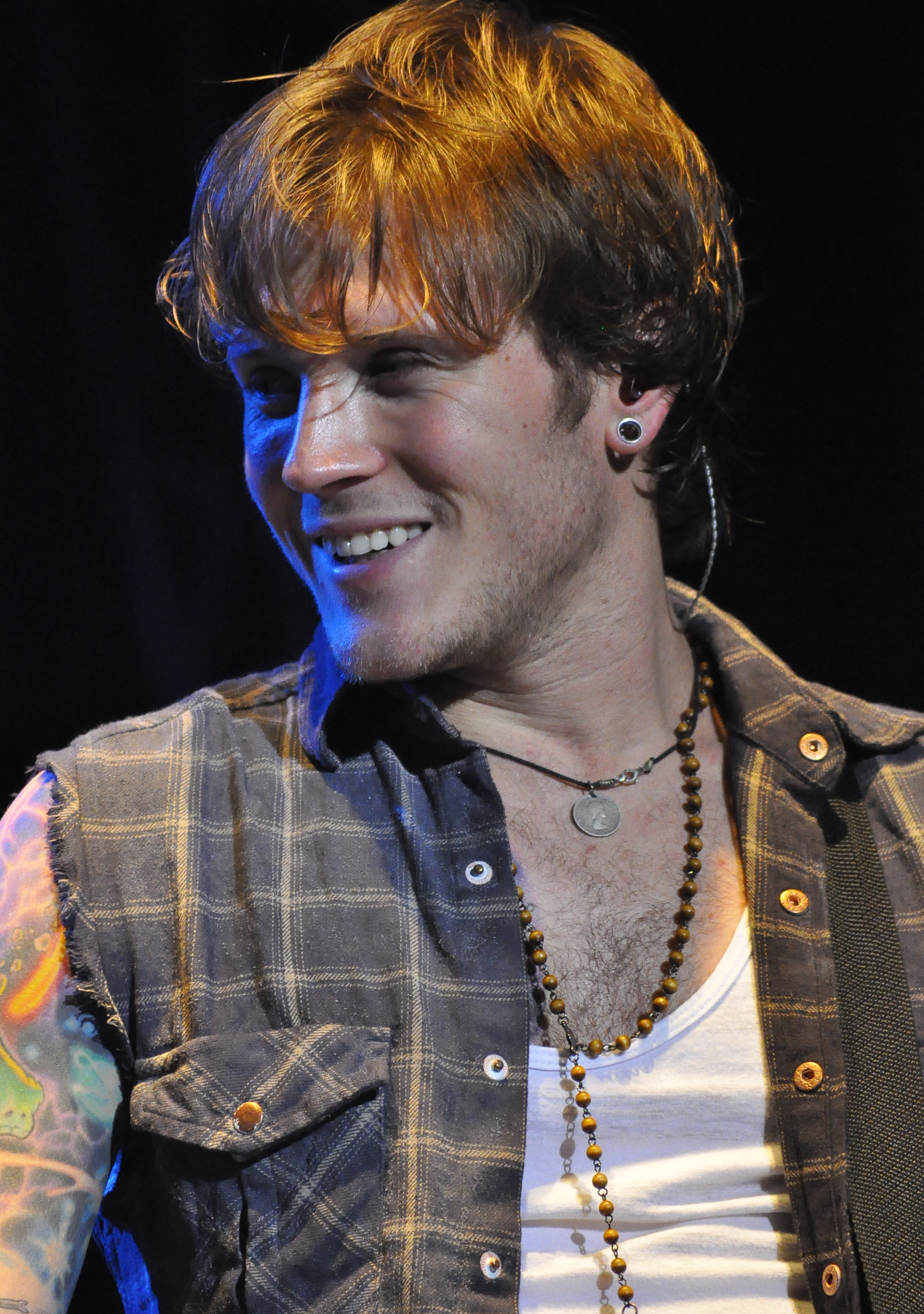
Remember Monday wrote and recorded "Delusional" with McFly members Danny Jones and Dougie Poynter whilst touring with McFly.

"Delusional" has been described as a pop rock song influenced by the 2000s, a sonic shift for the group, who have previously rooted themselves in the country pop genre. After it was announced that they would be touring with McFly, it was reported that they had become friends with members Danny Jones and Dougie Poynter and were making music together. Together, Jones and Poynter operate as music producer duo Sidequest. Upon its release, it was confirmed that members Lauren Byrne and Holly-Anne Hull had written the track with Jones and Poynter, as well as Kaity Rae and Steven Battelle. Rae and Sidequest produced "Delusional".

The lyrical content of "Delusional" dissects the "chaotic comedy" of feeling love at first sight. Its lyrics talk about being delusional when feeling adoration for somebody and imagining a full romance with them. It features "tongue-in-cheek" and "unhinged" lines about them planning a full future with a man who barely knows they exist. It is written from the point of view of a "character who draws hearts in her notebook around the name of the guy she's crushing on", with the group admitting they have related to the story. Speaking about their goal with "Delusional" and their upcoming material, they explained: "our goal is to transport you into a rom com movie from the late 90s/early 00s. We want to give you the big feelings, the ridiculous moments, the songs that make you convinced your life has a director and a perfectly curated soundtrack. That's the world we've been living in while working on our new music".

== Critical reception ==
Music News praised the track, writing that it is "underpinned by unmistakable vocal chemistry [and] seamlessly leans into 00s-inspired pop-rock hooks". They dubbed it a "defining" release for the group and expressed their excitement for their future releases. 1883 Magazine wrote that the song feels "bigger, bolder and unapologetically fun" compared to their prior releases. They complimented their shift in musical direction, noting that it feels authentic to the group and felt it would be apt at the end of a coming-of-age film.

== Credits and personnel ==
Credits adapted from Spotify.

- Lauren Byrne – vocals, songwriting
- Holly-Anne Hull – vocals, songwriting
- Charlotte Steele – vocals
- Kaity Rae – songwriting, production, synthesizer
- Danny Jones – songwriting, guitar, drums
- Dougie Poynter – songwriting
- Steven Battelle – songwriting, electric bass guitar
- Sidequest – production
- Yasmin Ogilvie – saxophone
- Dan Jenkins – mixing engineer
- Dick Beetham – mastering engineer

== Release history ==
Region	Date	Format	Label	Ref.
Various	22 May 2026	Digital download; streaming	Nothing Nice to Say	
