= United Kingdom in the Eurovision Song Contest 2025 =

- Eurovision Song Contest 2025
- Participating broadcaster: British Broadcasting Corporation (BBC)
- Country: United Kingdom
- Selection process: Internal selection
- Announcement date: 7 March 2025

Competing entry
- Song: "What the Hell Just Happened?"
- Artist: Remember Monday
- Songwriters: Charlotte Steele; Holly-Anne Hull; Julie Aagaard; Kes Kamara; Lauren Byrne; Sam Brennan; Thomas Stengaard; Tom Hollings

Placement
- Final result: 19th, 88 points

Participation chronology

The United Kingdom was represented at the Eurovision Song Contest 2025 with the song "What the Hell Just Happened?", written by Charlotte Steele, Holly-Anne Hull, Julie Aagaard, Kes Kamara, Lauren Byrne, Sam Brennan, Thomas Stengaard, and Tom Hollings, and performed by Steele, Hull, and Byrne as Remember Monday. The British participating broadcaster, the British Broadcasting Corporation (BBC), internally selected its entry for the contest.

As a member of the "Big Five", the United Kingdom automatically qualifies to compete in the final of the Eurovision Song Contest. Performing in position 8, the United Kingdom placed nineteenth out of the 26 performing countries with 88 points.

== Background ==
Prior to the 2025 contest, the British Broadcasting Corporation (BBC) has participated in the Eurovision Song Contest representing the United Kingdom sixty-six times since its first entry in 1957. Thus far, it has won the contest five times: in 1967 with the song "Puppet on a String" performed by Sandie Shaw, in 1969 with the song "Boom Bang-a-Bang" performed by Lulu, in 1976 with "Save Your Kisses for Me" performed by Brotherhood of Man, in 1981 with the song "Making Your Mind Up" performed by Bucks Fizz and in 1997 with the song "Love Shine a Light" performed by Katrina and the Waves. After its last win, it has failed to be consistently successful, only reaching the top ten four times: in 1998, 2002, 2009, and 2022; and ending last five times: in 2003 (the first time in the country's history in the contest), 2008, 2010, 2019, and 2021. In 2024, it was represented by "Dizzy" performed by Olly Alexander, which finished in 18th place. The United Kingdom is the country that has hosted the contest the most times, with nine in total (in 1960, 1963, 1968, 1972, 1974, 1977, 1982, 1998, and 2023).

As part of its duties as participating broadcaster, the BBC organises the selection of its entry in the Eurovision Song Contest and broadcasts the event in the country. The broadcaster has used various methods to select its entry: From 1957 to 2010, it organised a national final which featured a competition among several artists and songs to choose its entry for the contest. Between 2011 and 2015, the BBC opted to internally select its entry. For its 2016 entry, the broadcaster announced that a national final would be organised again. The same process was used in 2017 and 2018, and changes were brought in for 2019. From 2020, the BBC opted to return to an internal selection.

== Before Eurovision ==
=== Internal selection ===
The BBC internally selected its entry for the 2025 contest. On 16 October 2024, in a press release, the broadcaster announced that its internal selection would be led by Andrew Cartmell, who was appointed as the head of delegation for the country, and David May, who previously served as manager for Sam Ryder, who finished in second place for the United Kingdom in 2022. The BBC confirmed that its search for the British entry had been underway for several months with a multitude of British record labels, publisher, songwriters, and the broadcaster's music production labels BBC Music and BBC Introducing. It was also revealed that the British entry would released to the public in March 2025.

On 29 January 2025, during The Scott Mills Breakfast Show on BBC Radio 2, Mills confirmed that the British entry had already been selected and that work was underway in its final presentation. On 4 February 2025, BBC Radio 1 hosts Natalie O'Leary and Vicky Hawkesworth stated that the group Remember Monday had been selected to represent the United Kingdom in Basel, leading to a multitude of British media outlets confirming the group to be the selected entrants; the BBC did not respond to the speculation. On 7 March 2025, during The Scott Mills Breakfast Show, Remember Monday were officially confirmed as the British representatives with the song "What the Hell Just Happened?". The song was written by group members Charlotte Steele, Holly-Anne Hull, and Lauren Byrne, alongside Julie Aagaard, Kes Kamara, Sam Brennan, Thomas Stengaard, and Tom Hollings.

== At Eurovision ==
The Eurovision Song Contest 2025 took place at St. Jakobshalle in Basel, Switzerland, and consisted of two semi-finals held on the respective dates of 13 and 15 May and the final on 17 May 2025. All nations with the exceptions of the host country and the "Big Five" (France, Germany, Italy, Spain and the United Kingdom) were required to qualify from one of two semi-finals in order to compete in the final; the top ten countries from each semi-final progresses to the final. As a member of the "Big Five", the United Kingdom automatically qualified to compete in the final on 17 May 2025, but is also required to broadcast and vote in one of the two semi-finals. This was decided via a draw held during the semi-final allocation draw on 28 January 2025, when it was announced that the United Kingdom would be voting in the second semi-final. Despite being an automatic qualifier for the final, the British entry was also performed during the semi-final.

The Doctor Who episode "The Interstellar Song Contest" aired on BBC One on the same day as the final, featuring appearances from UK Eurovision commentators Graham Norton and Rylan Clark. Related to this, the then-lead star of Doctor Who, Ncuti Gatwa, was set to appear as the spokesperson for the United Kingdom, announcing its jury votes in the contest. However, it was announced on 15 May that Sophie Ellis-Bextor would replace Gatwa as spokesperson, citing "unforeseen circumstances".

=== Voting ===
Below is a breakdown of points awarded to and by the United Kingdom in the second semi-final and in the final. Voting during the three shows involved each country awarding sets of points from 1–8, 10 and 12: one from their professional jury and the other from televoting in the final vote, while the semi-final vote was based entirely on the vote of the public. The UK jury consisted of Liz McClarnon, Tom Ogden, Afrodeutsche, Mark Lippman, and Carl Parris. In the final, the United Kingdom placed 19th with 88 points, including 12 points from Italy in the jury vote. Over the course of the contest, the UK awarded its 12 points to Israel in the second semi-final, and to Latvia (jury) and Israel (televote) in the final.

==== Points awarded to the United Kingdom ====
Points awarded to the United Kingdom (Final)
Score	Televote	Jury
12 points	—N/a	Italy
10 points	—N/a	Czechia; Ukraine
8 points	—N/a	—N/a
7 points	—N/a	Austria; Norway
6 points	—N/a	Luxembourg; Spain
5 points	—N/a	Estonia; Finland; Iceland
4 points	—N/a	Denmark; Switzerland
3 points	—N/a	—N/a
2 points	—N/a	Ireland; Portugal; San Marino
1 point	—N/a	Poland

==== Points awarded by the United Kingdom ====
Points awarded by the United Kingdom (Semi-final 2)
Score	Televote
12 points	Israel
10 points	Lithuania
8 points	Latvia
7 points	Ireland
6 points	Denmark
5 points	Australia
4 points	Finland
3 points	Greece
2 points	Malta
1 point	Luxembourg

Points awarded by the United Kingdom (Final)
Score	Televote	Jury
12 points	Israel	Latvia
10 points	Poland	Denmark
8 points	Lithuania	Austria
7 points	Sweden	Malta
6 points	Estonia	Lithuania
5 points	Albania	Finland
4 points	Finland	Luxembourg
3 points	Latvia	Estonia
2 points	Greece	France
1 point	Malta	Greece

==== Detailed voting results ====
Each participating broadcaster assembles a five-member jury panel consisting of music industry professionals who are citizens of the country they represent. Each jury, and individual jury member, is required to meet a strict set of criteria regarding professional background, as well as diversity in gender and age. No member of a national jury was permitted to be related in any way to any of the competing acts in such a way that they cannot vote impartially and independently. The individual rankings of each jury member as well as the nation's televoting results were released shortly after the grand final.

The following members comprised the British jury:

- Mark Lippman
- Tom Ogden
- Carl Bernard Parris
- Liz McClarnon
- Henrietta Smith-Rolla (Afrodeutsche)

Detailed voting results from United Kingdom (Semi-final 2)
R/O	Country	Televote	
R/O	Country	Rank	Points
01	Australia	6	5
02	Montenegro	16	
03	Ireland	4	7
04	Latvia	3	8
05	Armenia	13	
06	Austria	12	
07	Greece	8	3
08	Lithuania	2	10
09	Malta	9	2
10	Georgia	15	
11	Denmark	5	6
12	Czechia	11	
13	Luxembourg	10	1
14	Israel	1	12
15	Serbia	14	
16	Finland	7	4

Detailed voting results from United Kingdom (Final)
R/O	Country	Jury							Televote	
R/O	Country	Juror A	Juror B	Juror C	Juror D	Juror E	Rank	Points	Rank	Points
01	Norway	8	6	14	14	13	14		24	
02	Luxembourg	6	8	12	4	11	7	4	20	
03	Estonia	9	17	15	2	12	8	3	5	6
04	Israel	14	18	16	16	21	22		1	12
05	Lithuania	20	4	1	12	20	5	6	3	8
06	Spain	7	7	11	15	16	15		17	
07	Ukraine	21	16	6	17	22	21		14	
08	United Kingdom									
09	Austria	5	1	24	6	6	3	8	12	
10	Iceland	22	19	23	24	10	23		11	
11	Latvia	1	5	25	1	5	1	12	8	3
12	Netherlands	10	9	13	18	7	17		18	
13	Finland	19	10	7	5	3	6	5	7	4
14	Italy	18	11	9	10	23	20		15	
15	Poland	4	20	18	19	14	19		2	10
16	Germany	17	12	8	7	17	18		13	
17	Greece	15	21	2	20	9	10	1	9	2
18	Armenia	16	2	19	25	18	13		19	
19	Switzerland	11	22	4	8	15	12		22	
20	Malta	2	15	22	3	4	4	7	10	1
21	Portugal	12	14	5	9	24	16		21	
22	Denmark	3	13	3	13	1	2	10	16	
23	Sweden	13	23	17	11	2	11		4	7
24	France	23	3	10	21	8	9	2	23	
25	San Marino	24	25	21	23	25	25		25	
26	Albania	25	24	20	22	19	24		6	5
