= Attention (Remember Monday song) =

2026 single by Remember Monday

Single by Remember Monday

from the album Can We Press Rewind
- Released: 14 August 2026
- Genre: Pop
- Length: 3:52
- Label: Nothing Nice to Say
- Songwriters: Lauren Byrne; Holly-Anne Hull; Paul Whalley
- Producers: Paul Whalley; St£fan; Steven Battelle

Remember Monday singles chronology
"Delusional" (2026)	"Attention" (2026)	"Dream Cheat" (2026)

"Attention" is a song recorded by British girl group Remember Monday. It was released on 14 August 2026 through their label, Nothing Nice to Say. Written by members Lauren Byrne and Holly-Anne Hull with co-writing from Paul Whalley, the track was produced by Paul Whalley, St£fan and Steven Battelle.

Similarly to previous single "Delusional", Remember Monday have stated that their goal with "Attention" was to emulate music featured in romcom films from the 1990s and 2000s. The lyrical content of the song follows the group on a night-out where they lie about things for attention. The backstory of "Attention" roots back to the group going clubbing together once they had turned 18 and creating alter egos to get free drinks, free entry to nightclubs and attention from others.

== Background and release ==
In 2025, Remember Monday were selected to represent the UK for the Eurovision Song Contest 2025. They competed with the song "What the Hell Just Happened?" and finished in tenth with the juries and 19th overall in the contest. Following the contest, they released standalone singles "Happier" and "More Than Ever". They then took a break from releasing music to focus on writing new material, returning with "Delusional", on 22 May 2026. They later debuted "Attention" whilst supporting McFly on tour in mid-2026; the release of the song was later confirmed for 14 August.

== Composition and lyrics ==
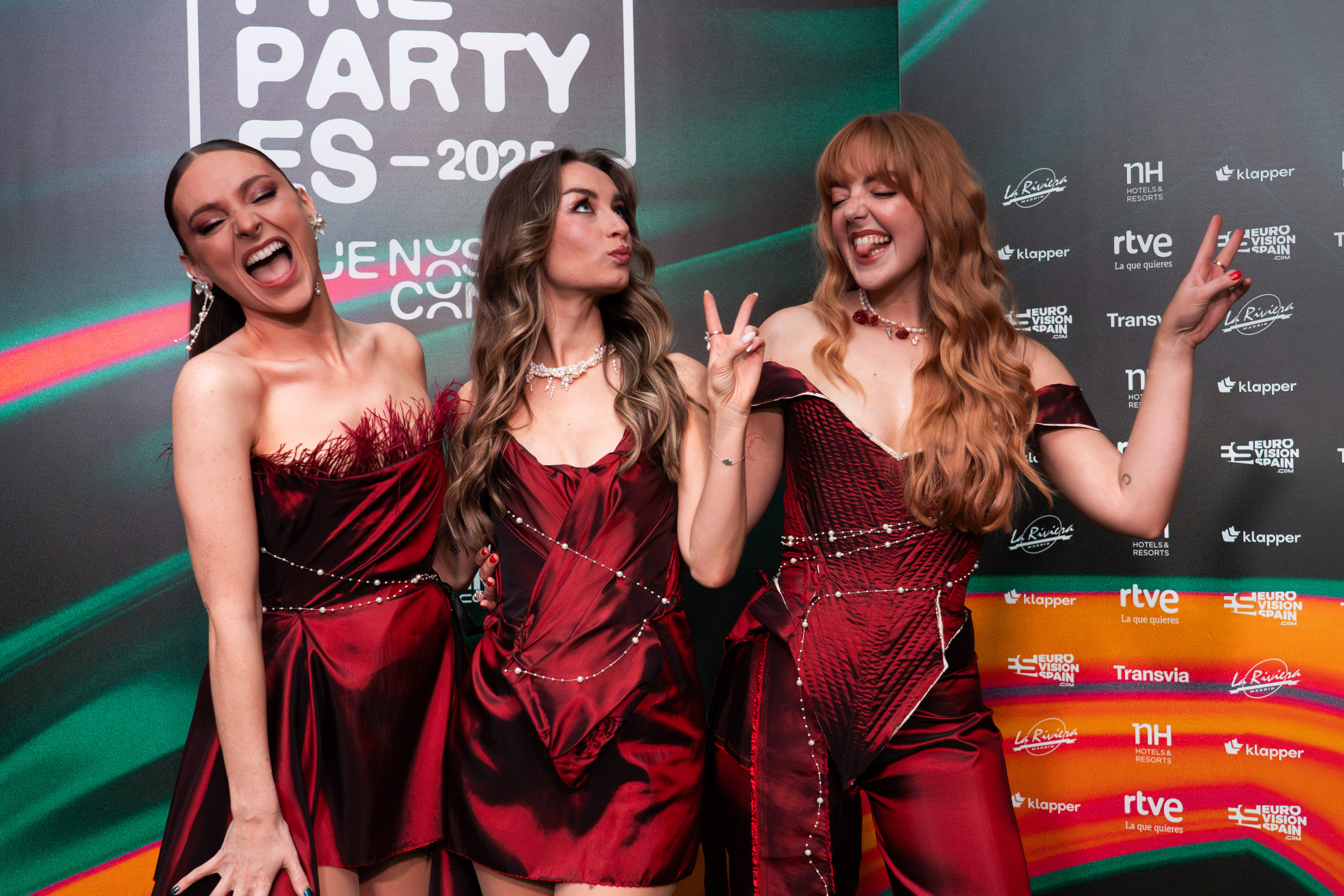
"Attention" sees Remember Monday joke that Elton John is a family friend and that he wrote "Your Song" about their mother.

Described as a pop song, "Attention" continues to see Remember Monday follow a sonic shift, since they had previously rooted themselves in the country pop genre. Like "Delusional", the song was influenced by 2000s music; the group's goal was "to transport you into a rom com movie from the late 90s/early 00s. We want to give you the big feelings, the ridiculous moments, the songs that make you convinced your life has a director and a perfectly curated soundtrack. That's the world we've been living in while working on our new music". The song was written by members Lauren Byrne and Holly-Anne Hull with co-writing from Paul Whalley, while production was handled by Paul Whalley, St£fan and Steven Battelle.

The lyrical content of "Attention" follows the group on a night-out where they become alter egos of themselves by lying about things for attention in a bid to become unforgettable. The lyrics see Remember Monday joke about how they would rather die than be ignored, as well as mentioning lies including that Elton John is their father's best friend and that his song "Your Song" was written about their mother. Speaking on the backstory of "Attention", the group stated that the second they were old enough to go clubbing together, they became committed to lying to as many people as possible on nights out. They recalled Hull being 'Kelsie', a millionaire from Nashville whose dad invented the yo-yo, Steele being 'Charlene', a Liverpudlian whose ex-boyfriend was Andrew Garfield, and Byrne being 'Lucie', an Australian shark-attack survivor. They joked that their elaborate stories would get them free drinks, free entry, but "most importantly, they'd simply get us a whole lot of attention".

== Critical reception ==
The Official Charts Company described "Attention" as "playful" and a "tongue-in-cheek pop anthem". Eurovision Song Contest blog That Eurovision Site praised the chorus of the song and billed it "instantly catchy, and fits the theme of an attention craving girls-night-out", as well as calling the track "light-hearted pop perfection". Jo Forrest, writing for TotalNtertainment, appreciated "the wit, personality and theatrical flair" shown by Remember Monday in the song. Forrest complimented their ability to turn regular experiences into "instantly memorable pop moments" and praised the pop route the group had gone down.

== Credits and personnel ==
Credits adapted from Spotify.

- Lauren Byrne – vocals, songwriting
- Holly-Anne Hull – vocals, songwriting
- Charlotte Steele – vocals
- Paul Whalley – songwriting, production
- St£fan – production
- Steven Battelle – production
- Dick Beetham – mastering engineer
- Dan Jenkins – mixing engineer

== Release history ==
Region	Date	Format	Label	Ref.
Various	14 August 2026	Digital download; streaming	Nothing Nice to Say	
