= Treason (musical) =

Musical based on the 1605 Gunpowder Plot

- The Musical
- Music: Ricky Allan
- Lyrics: Ricky Allan
- Book: Ricky Allan; Kieran Lynn
- Basis: The Gunpowder Plot of 1605
- Productions: 2022 West End; 2023 UK tour

Treason is a musical with music and lyrics by Ricky Allan with a book by Allan and Kieran Lynn based on the 1605 Gunpowder Plot.

== Background and development ==
The musical was announced in November 2020 and released a 5-track EP featured Hadley Fraser and Rosalie Craig.

In March 2021, a concert filmed at the Cadogan Hall was streamed featuring Lucie Jones, Bradley Jaden, Oliver Tompsett and Cedric Neal. 3 tracks were released on a new EP titled Acoustic Fables. Workshops were held in December 2021 with students from the Royal Academy of Music and in March 2022.

In August 2022, two sold-out concerts were performed at the Theatre Royal, Drury Lane starring Carrie Hope Fletcher, Daniel Boys, Bradley Jaden, Simon-Anthony Rhoden and Les Dennis. A live album was released titled "Lighting the Fuse: Sparks from Treason in Concert" on 10 February 2023. Another 6-week workshop was also held in March 2023.

== Production history ==
=== World premiere: UK tour (2023) ===
The musical had its world premiere production opening at the Edinburgh Festival Theatre from 25 to 28 October 2023, before touring to the Lyceum Theatre, Sheffield (31 October to 4 November), Alexandra Palace, London (8 to 18 November) and the London Palladium (21 to 22 November - due to a cancelled run at the Orchard Theatre, Dartford) directed by Hannah Chissick and starring Nicole Raquel Dennis as Martha Percy, Joe McFadden as King James I of England and Emilie Louise Israel as Anne Vaux. Full casting was announced on 16 October 2023.

== Cast and characters ==
Character	West End premiere	UK tour
Character	2022	2023
Martha Percy	Carrie Hope Fletcher	Nicole Raquel Dennis
King James I of England	Daniel Boys	Joe McFadden
Thomas Percy	Bradley Jaden	Sam Ferriday
Robert Cecil	Les Dennis	Oscar Conlon-Morrey
Guy Fawkes	-	Gabriel Akamo
Jack Wright	Waylon Jacobs	Kyle Cox
Anne Vaux	Rebecca LaChance	Emilie Louise Israel
Little Wintour	-	Lewis Edgar
Robert Catesby	Simon-Anthony Rhoden	Connor Jones
Big Wintour	-	Alfie Richards
