= West End Kids =

London-based song and dance troupe

General information
- Name: West End Kids
- Year founded: 2001
- Founding artistic director: Martin Gwyn Williams
- Website: westendkids.co.uk

Artistic staff
- Music director: Martin Gwyn Williams
- Resident choreographers: Emma Louise Williams

West End Kids is a song and dance troupe founded in 2001 by artistic director Martin Gwyn Williams and based in Central London. The troupe performs at festivals, charity events and state occasions, which included a performance at the Queen's Diamond Jubilee and the 90th birthday of Elizabeth II. The performers join the companies between ages 9 to 18 and can stay with the company until the age of 21.

== History ==
The musical director Martin Gwyn Williams founded the company in 2001. The song and dance troupe was among the first to be formed in the UK. In 2004, the company was named West End Kids. Between 2001 and 2010, the ensemble has performed throughout the United Kingdom, which included a performance at Commonwealth State Banquet in front of Prime Minister David Cameron and five hundred dignitaries.

The troupe has performed at Common People Festival, Camp Bestival, London 2012 'One Year To Go' ceremony, Chelsea Flower Show, o2 Arena, Diamond Jubilee of Elizabeth II, Mansion House and Windsor Castle.

Most recently it has performed at the Queen's 90th birthday celebration at Windsor Castle, National Armed Forces Day, the Royal Albert Hall, the House of Lords, Hamleys Christmas Toy Parade, CarFest South, Hampton Court Palace, West End LIVE, Pride In London, British Summer Time Festival, Glastonbury Festival, and Queen's Platinum Jubilee.

Notable alumni include West End singer Holly-Anne Hull, who represented the United Kingdom at the 2025 Eurovision Song Contest as part of the group Remember Monday.
