= Holly-Anne Hull =

English singer and actress (born 1994)

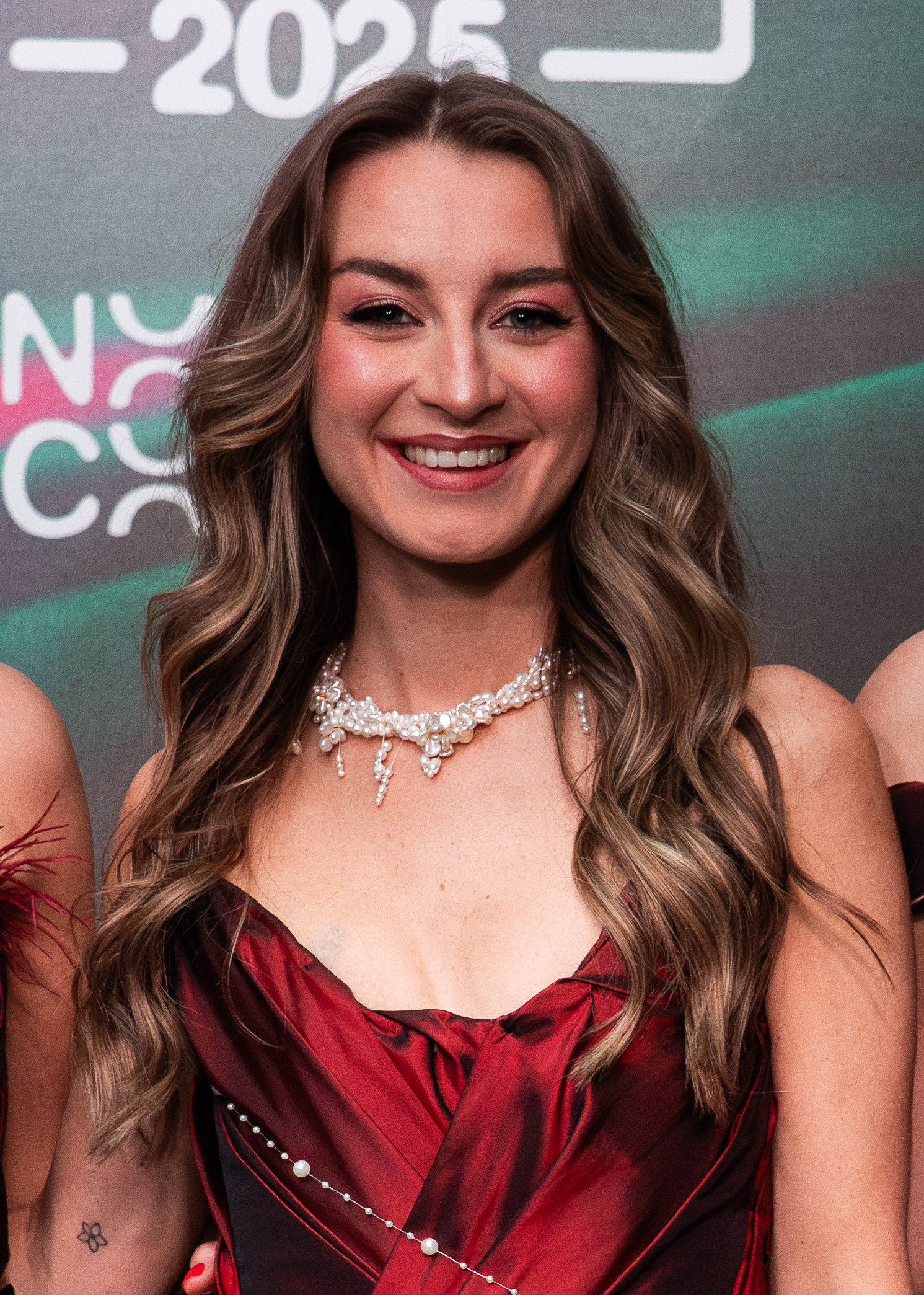
- Hull in 2025

Background information
- Born: 17 October 1994 (age 31)
- Origin: Camberley, Surrey
- Occupations: Singer; actress
- Instrument: Vocals
- Years active: 2009–present
- Member of: Remember Monday

Holly-Anne Hull (born 17 October 1994) is an English singer and actress. She performed for Elizabeth II in 2006 with the National Youth Music Theatre, and won the Disney Channel UK competition My Camp Rock in April 2009 and released a version of "This Is Me" alongside a music video. She has also played various roles in Copacabana, Robin Hood and the Babes in the Wood, Loserville, Les Misérables, The Phantom of the Opera, and Stephen Sondheim's Old Friends. In 2013, she became a member of the country-pop girl group Remember Monday, who went on to reach the knockout stages of the eighth series of The Voice UK, performed on The Jennifer Hudson Show, and represented the UK at the Eurovision Song Contest 2025 with "What the Hell Just Happened?".

== Life and career ==
Holly-Anne Hull was born on 17 October 1994 and is from Camberley in Surrey. She started singing aged seven, having trained with West End Kids, and attended Our Lady’s Preparatory School in Crowthorne, Licensed Victuallers' School, and the London School of Musical Theatre. Her first performances were with Stagecoach Performing Arts. By May 2006, Hull had joined Guildford School of Acting and National Youth Music Theatre; that month, as part of the latter, she performed at Elizabeth II's 80th Birthday celebrations at Windsor Castle. She met Queen Elizabeth and Princess Beatrice after the performance and was asked by the former why she was not wearing shoes (it was part of her costume). In April 2009, she won the Disney Channel UK competition My Camp Rock, the prize for which was recording her own version of "This Is Me" alongside a music video. She was subsequently signed by Disney, who filmed a performance of "This Is Me" at a school assembly and then dropped her.

My Camp Rock performances
Round	Song choice	Original artist	Result
Audition	"This Is Me"	Demi Lovato	Advanced
Bootcamp	"Listen"	Beyoncé	Advanced
Camp Jam	"Here I Am"	Camp Rock	Advanced
Final Jam	"This Is Me"	Demi Lovato	Winner

Trailer for Remember Monday's episode of The Jennifer Hudson Show

In 2013, Hull formed the band Houston with Lauren Byrne and Charlotte Steele, who she had met at Sixth Form College, Farnborough. The following year, she appeared in Copacabana, though this folded after running into financial difficulties, (Note: For the fact that she appeared in Copacabana, see.; For the fact that she did so before Loserville, see.; For the fact that the tour specifically took place in 2014, see.) and played Maid Marian in a production of Robin Hood and the Babes in the Wood at Grove Theatre in Dunstable. She won the latter part at Panto Factor, a local talent contest to find the role of Marian and Hood; Steve Sims of Leighton Buzzard Online wrote that both the contest's winners, Hull and Eleanor Sandars, "slotted seamlessly" into the production. Hull then played Holly Manson in Loserville in 2015; writing of a March edition, Time Out wrote that Hull and Luke Newton were "adorbs enough" as Manson and Michael Dork, while Daniel Coleman Cooke of BritishTheatre.com wrote in December 2015 that Hull had a "superb voice" but felt that she was sometimes drowned out by the band. Hull has stated that she was unemployed between performances and was the only returnee.

Houston changed their name to Remember Monday in 2018. By the following January, both Hull and Steele had begun teaching at Bracknell theatre schools, with Hull teaching at BARTA Theatre Academy. That month, Remember Monday performed on The Voice UK series 8, where they reached the Knockout stages. By August 2019, Hull had performed an ensemble role in Les Misérables and had covered as Cosette in both its international tour and in the West End of London; that month, she played a whore. The following year, Hull took a post as Christine Daaé in The Phantom of the Opera; originally booked for 14 months, the production ended after the COVID-19 pandemic in the United Kingdom shut down the theatre industry and was eventually cancelled. Hull has stated that she undertook 13 pre-pandemic performances. After production reopened in July 2021, she took a role as an alternate for Daaé, with Lucy St. Louis taking on most performances; she reclaimed the role full time in January 2023. That June, Hull married.

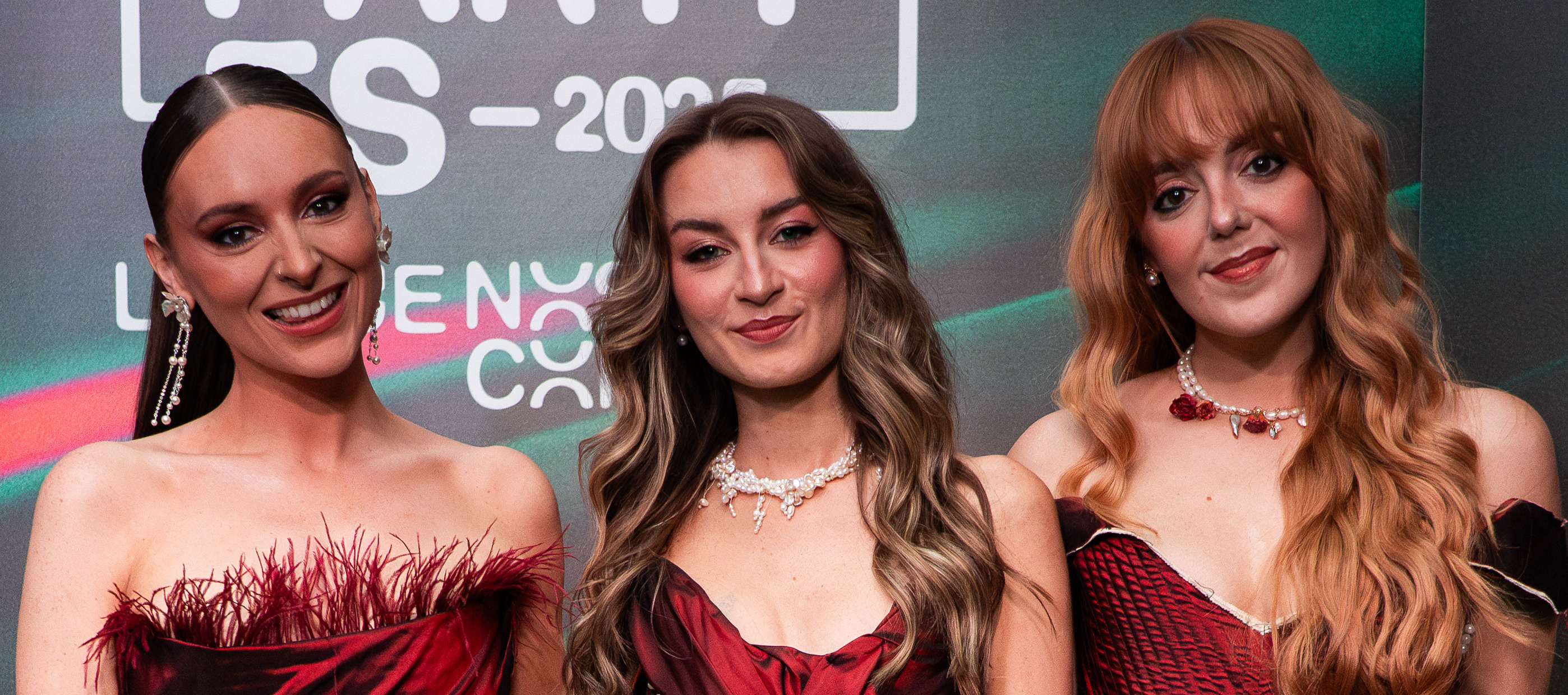
Charlotte Steele, Holly-Anne Hull, and Lauren Byrne in 2025

In May 2022, Hull participated in a one-off performance at Stephen Sondheim's Old Friends, a show mounted in tribute to the composer who had died the previous year; she performed a solo on "Getting Married Today" and "A Weekend in the Country". Remember Monday quit their jobs to perform music full time in September 2023 and performed "Hand in My Pocket" by Alanis Morissette on The Jennifer Hudson Show in 2024. That October, they released an EP, Crazy Anyway. On 7 February 2025, the band were announced as the BBC's entrant for the Eurovision Song Contest 2025 by Nat O'Leary and Vicky Hawkesworth on their BBC Radio 1 show that morning; a month later, the BBC announced that they would do so with "What the Hell Just Happened?". The song charted at No. 95 on the UK singles chart, came 19th at Eurovision with 88 points from the jury and zero from the public, and then re-entered the singles chart at No. 31. Shortly afterwards, Hull posted on Instagram that she had lost her wedding ring and engagement ring; she later recovered the former.

== Discography ==
=== Singles ===
Year	Song	Ref.
2009	"This Is Me"	

=== Other appearances ===
Year	Song	Album	Ref.
2023	"Getting Married Today"	Stephen Sondheim's Old Friends: A Celebration (Live at the Sondheim Theatre)	

=== Music videos ===
Year	Song	Ref.
2009	"This Is Me"	
