= Grace Blakeley =

British economic and political pundit (born 1993)

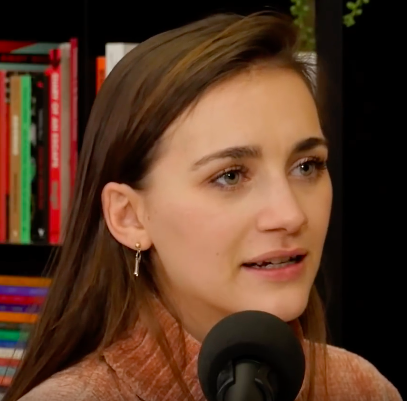
- Blakeley in 2019
- Born: 26 June 1993 (age 33); Basingstoke, Hampshire, England
- Education: Lord Wandsworth College; Sixth Form College, Farnborough
- Alma mater: St Peter's College, Oxford; St Antony's College, Oxford
- Occupations: Commentator; columnist; journalist; author
- Employers: Tribune (2020–present); New Statesman (2019)
- Political party: Green Party of England and Wales
- Writing career
- Subjects: Democratic socialism; Left-wing politics; Euroscepticism; Decentralisation; Green politics
- Notable works: Stolen: How to Save the World from Financialisation (2019); The Corona Crash: How the Pandemic Will Change Capitalism (2020); Vulture Capitalism: Corporate Crimes, Backdoor Bailouts, and the Death of Freedom (2024)
- Website: graceblakeley.co.uk

Grace Blakeley (born 26 June 1993) is an English economics and politics commentator, columnist, journalist and author. She is a staff writer for Tribune and panelist on TalkTV. She was previously the economics commentator of the New Statesman and has contributed to Novara Media.

== Early life ==
Grace Blakeley was born in Basingstoke in Hampshire, England. She is half Welsh on her father's side. She was privately educated to GCSE level at Lord Wandsworth College, and later attended the Sixth Form College, Farnborough. She studied philosophy, politics and economics at St Peter's College, Oxford, graduating with a first class honours degree. Blakeley then obtained a master's degree in African studies at St Antony's College, Oxford. After graduating, she worked as a management consultant for KPMG in their Public Sector and Healthcare Practice division. Blakeley then worked as a research fellow for a year at a left-wing think tank, the Institute for Public Policy Research, in Manchester, specialising in regional economic policy.

== Career ==
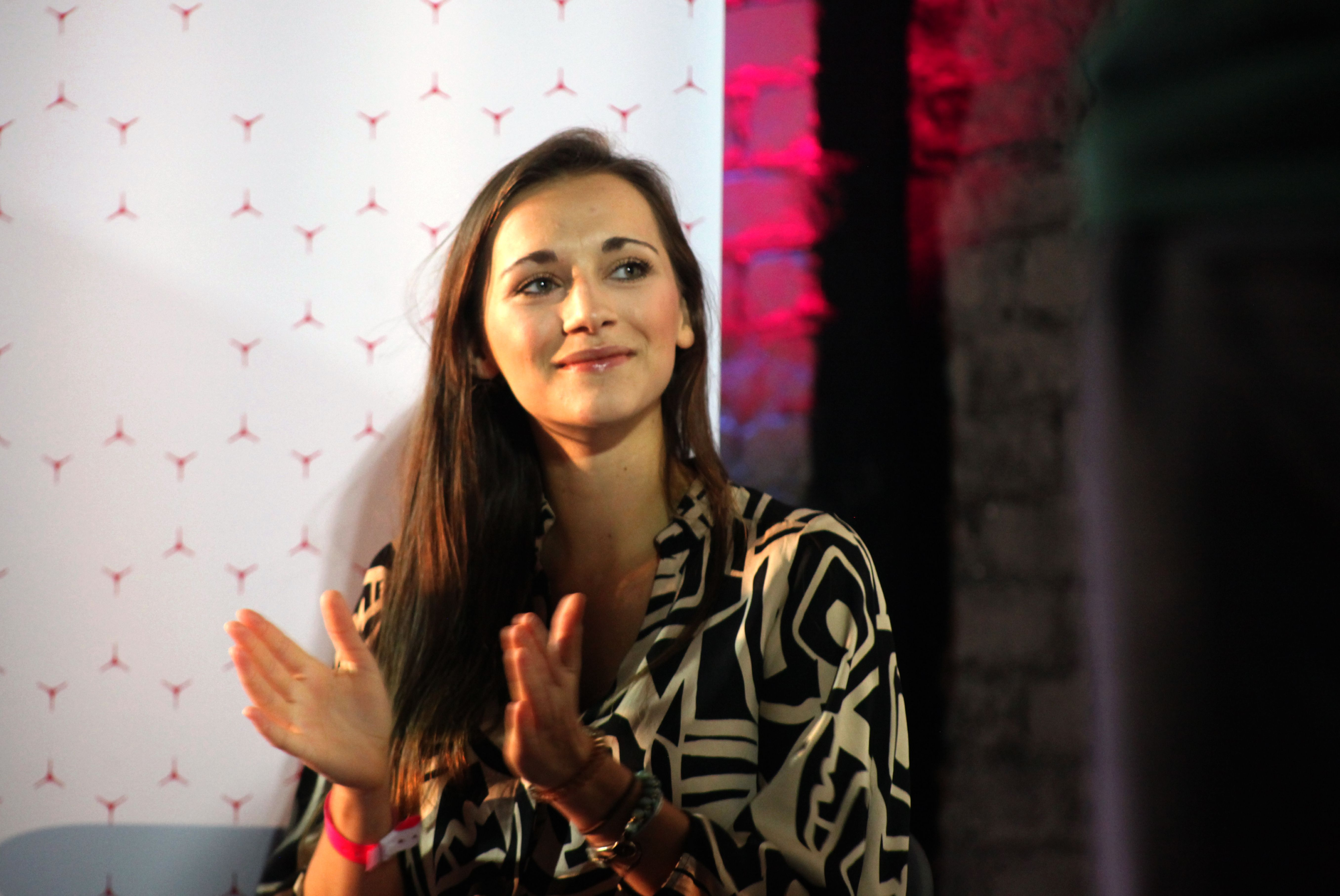
Blakeley in September 2018

Blakeley joined the magazine New Statesman in January 2019 as its economics commentator, writing a fortnightly column and contributing to the website and podcasts. Her articles for the magazine included support for Lexit and a Green New Deal. Her first book, Stolen: How to Save the World from Financialisation, was published by Repeater Books on 10 September 2019. Michael Galant writing for the openDemocracy website, praised the book as a "convincing critique of modern capitalism for socialists and sceptics alike". CapX's Diego Zuluaga commented in his review that it was a "sweeping polemic against the market economy", and felt the author had been selective in how she presented evidence for her arguments.

Blakeley became a staff writer for the democratic socialist magazine Tribune in January 2020. She has sat on the Labour Party's National Policy Forum, which is responsible for policy development.

Blakeley's second book, The Corona Crash: How the Pandemic Will Change Capitalism, was published in October 2020. Her next book, Vulture Capitalism: Corporate Crimes, Backdoor Bailouts, and the Death of Freedom, was published in 2024. The book was Longlisted for the 2024 Women’s Prize for Non-Fiction. Much of the book was written from Cornwall, which Blakeley made her new home after her relocation from London.

== Political views ==
Blakeley identifies as a democratic socialist and supports the use of capital controls. She supported Jeremy Corbyn and voted for him in the 2015 and 2016 Labour leadership elections, though she criticised him in 2016 for failing to "challenge the hegemony of neoliberalism" in the way she had imagined he would. Blakeley stated in June 2024 that she left the Labour Party in 2023 over Keir Starmer's public statement during the Gaza genocide that Israel had the right to cut off Gaza's power and water.

Blakeley promotes a Green New Deal. Though she has emphasised it as running "counter to a capitalist system", she has argued that "even those who do not identify as socialists" may soon realise that a green industrial revolution is the "only option". She calls for a "fair transition towards a low-carbon economy".

Blakeley is a Eurosceptic, and has branded the European Union as "neoliberal", "neo-colonial" and "run in the interests of financial and corporate elites". In 2019, she wrote an article titled: "Why the left should champion Brexit", where she argued the EU was a barrier to building a socialist economy.

On 18 June 2025, it was announced that Blakeley had joined the Green Party of England and Wales in support for Zack Polanski's bid for leadership of the party.

== Works ==
=== Books ===
- (2019). Stolen: How to Save the World From Financialisation (London: Repeater Books), ISBN 978-1-912248-37-7
- (2020). The Corona Crash: How the Pandemic Will Change Capitalism (London: Verso Books), ISBN 978-1-83976-205-5
- (2024). Vulture Capitalism: Corporate Crimes, Backdoor Bailouts, and the Death of Freedom (London: Bloomsbury Publishing), ISBN 978-1-9821-8085-0, 978-1-9821-8087-4, 978-1-7971-7475-4

=== Edited books ===
- (2020). Futures of Socialism: The Pandemic and the Post-Corbyn Era (London: Verso Books), ISBN 978-1-83976-133-1
