= Remember Monday =

English country pop group

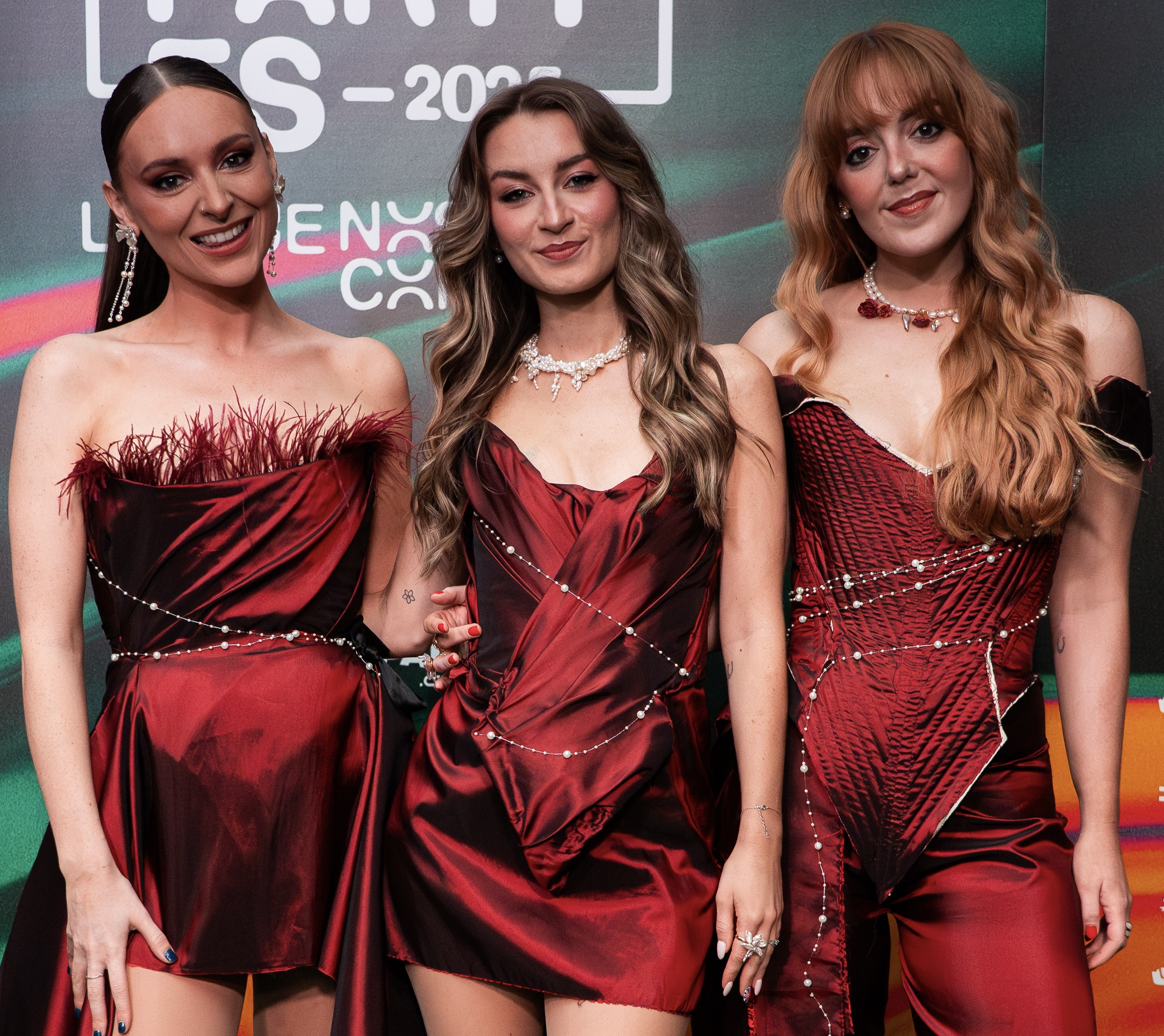
- Remember Monday in 2025; From left to right: Charlotte Steele, Holly-Anne Hull and Lauren Byrne

Background information
- Also known as: Houston
- Origin: Farnborough, Hampshire, England
- Genre: Country pop
- Years active: 2013–present
- Label: The Other Songs
- Members: Lauren Byrne; Holly-Anne Hull; Charlotte Steele

Remember Monday are an English country pop girl group consisting of members Lauren Byrne, Holly-Anne Hull and Charlotte Steele. The group gained prominence after appearing on The Voice UK in 2019. They represented the United Kingdom in the Eurovision Song Contest 2025 with the song "What the Hell Just Happened?", finishing in tenth with the juries and 19th overall in the contest.

== Career ==
The trio met while studying together at Sixth Form College, Farnborough, where they bonded over a shared passion for music. Hull had previously performed at the 80th birthday party of Elizabeth II and had previously won My Camp Rock in 2009 and performed in The Phantom of the Opera and Les Misérables. In addition, Byrne had performed in Six and Matilda and Steele had performed in Mary Poppins. At the time they formed in 2013, they were known as Houston; they changed their name in 2018 to Remember Monday, as they had free periods that day and could sing together.

Remember Monday appeared together on the 2019 run of The Voice UK, where they auditioned with "Kiss from a Rose" by Seal. All four judges turned, and the band opted to be mentored by Jennifer Hudson; partly because she was the only woman on the panel and partly because she threw a shoe at them, a practice she considered complimentary. The band subsequently beat Kieron Smith during the Battle round with Phillip Phillips's "Home", though a performance of their own track "Jailbreaker" during the Knockout stages meant they left the competition. The band left their jobs in September 2023 to pursue music full time, with Steele giving up the deputy headship at the performing arts school Artemis College.

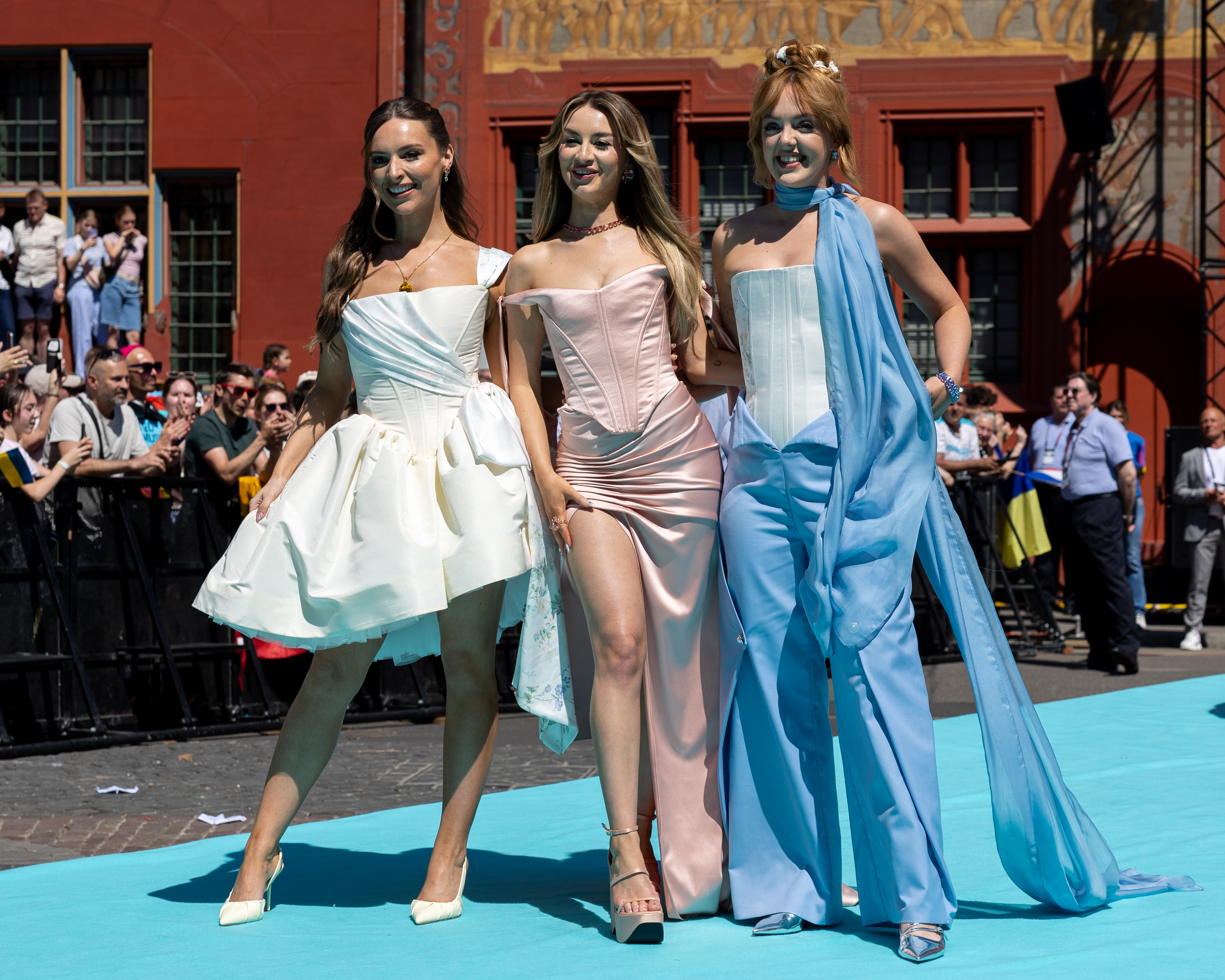
Remember Monday in 2025

Remember Monday performed "Hand in My Pocket" by Alanis Morissette on Hudson's chat show in 2024. Later in 2024, they released the song "What the Girls Bathroom Is For". They later donated 100% of the profits from the song to Mermaids, a charity that supports transgender youth. The decision was prompted by the UK's newly-introduced guidance on "single-sex spaces", meaning transgender people could be restricted access to using their toilets of choice. The group explained that the song was "all about celebrating girlhood and inclusivity in all its forms, and it felt like quite the stark opposite from these new rules that are being enforced. It just felt strange to have a song about that and not do anything?" They later released an EP, Crazy Anyway, that October.

On 7 February 2025, Nat O'Leary and Vicky Hawkesworth announced on their morning BBC Radio 1 show that the band would represent the United Kingdom at that year's Eurovision Song Contest. They were the first girl group to represent the UK since 1999 with Precious, and did so with "What the Hell Just Happened?", which charted at No. 95 on the UK singles chart the following week. It later peaked at 31 on the chart. The song placed 19th at the contest, after receiving 88 points from the jury vote, but zero points ('nul points') from the public vote.

Following Eurovision, Remember Monday released the song "Happier" in July 2025. It was followed by "More Than Ever" in October. On 14 November 2025, Remember Monday performed "Perfect Day" with the BBC Philharmonic Orchestra for Children in Need. Throughout mid-2026, Remember Monday supported McFly on a UK tour. It was reported that they had also been making music with two of the members; Danny Jones and Dougie Poynter. The first of Remember Monday's collaborative efforts with the pair, "Delusional", was released in May 2026. In August, they released "Attention".

== Discography ==
=== Studio albums ===
Title	Details
Can We Press Rewind	Released: 29 January 2027; Label: Silva Screen Records; Formats: Digital download, streaming

=== Extended plays ===
Title	Details
Hysterical Women	Released: 3 February 2023; Label: Self-released; Formats: Digital download, streaming
Crazy Anyway	Released: 25 October 2024; Label: Self-released; Formats: Digital download, streaming

=== Singles ===
Title	Year	Peak chart positions				Album
Title	Year	UK	UK Indie	LTU	SWI	Album
"Find My Way"	2019	—	—	—	—	Non-album singles
"Version of You"	2020	—	—	—	—	Non-album singles
"Fat Bottomed Girls"	2021	—	—	—	—	Non-album singles
"What I Know Now"	2021	—	—	—	—	Non-album singles
"Nothing Nice to Say"	2022	—	—	—	—	Hysterical Women
"Let Down"	2023	—	—	—	—	Hysterical Women
"Laugh About It"	2024	—	—	—	—	Non-album singles
"Hand in My Pocket"	2024	—	—	—	—	Non-album singles
"Show Face"	2024	—	—	—	—	Non-album singles
"Brown Eyed Girl"	2024	—	—	—	—	Non-album singles
"What the Girls Bathroom Is For"	2024	—	—	—	—	Non-album singles
"Famous"	2024	—	—	—	—	Crazy Anyway
"What the Hell Just Happened?"	2025	31	7	70	77	Non-album singles
"Happier"	2025	—	—	—	—	Non-album singles
"More Than Ever"	2025	— (Note: "More Than Ever" did not enter the UK Singles Chart, but peaked at number 70 at the UK Singles Sales Chart.)	—	—	—	Non-album singles
"Delusional"	2026	—	—	—	—	Can We Press Rewind
"Attention"	2026	—	—	—	—	Can We Press Rewind
"Dream Cheat"	2026	—	—	—	—	Can We Press Rewind
"—" denotes a recording that did not chart or was not released in that territory.

== Awards and nominations ==
Year	Award	Category	Nominee(s)	Result	Ref.
2025	Eurovision Awards	Onstage Ensemble	Themselves	Nominated	

== Notes ==
Awards and achievements
Preceded by Olly Alexander with "Dizzy"	United Kingdom in the Eurovision Song Contest; 2025	Succeeded by Look Mum No Computer with "Eins, Zwei, Drei"
