= Molly Hocking =

English singer

- Born: Molly Grace Hocking; 14 December 2000 (age 25); St Ives, Cornwall, England
- Genre: Pop
- Occupation: Singer
- Instruments: Vocals, piano
- Years active: 2017–present
- Labels: Polydor (2019–2020); Tristar Records (2022–2024); 127 Music Group (2024); GoldCrush Records (2025–present)
- Website: mollyhocking.com

Molly Grace Hocking (born 14 December 2000) is an English singer. In 2019, she won the eighth series of The Voice UK, winning a recording contract with Polydor Records. Now working on new music as an independent artist, her latest track "You Can't Hold Me Down" was released on 21 June 2024.

== Career ==
=== 2019: The Voice UK ===
In 2019, Hocking auditioned for the eighth series of The Voice UK, and joined Olly Murs's team. After performing "I'll Never Love Again" by Lady Gaga and Bradley Cooper, she was announced as the winner of the series, signing a contract with Polydor Records. Her winner's single reached number 73 on the UK Singles Charts.

Performed	Song	Original artist	Result
Blind Audition	"You Take My Breath Away"	Claire Hamill	Jennifer Hudson, Sir Tom Jones and Olly Murs turned Joined team Olly
Battle Rounds	"With You" (against Connie Lamb)	Original casting from the Ghost Musical	Won advanced to the knockouts
Knockout rounds	"Human"	Christina Perri	Saved by Coach
Semi-final	"I'll Never Love Again"	Lady Gaga and Bradley Cooper	Safe (1st)
Live final	"Someone You Loved"	Lewis Capaldi	Safe (1st)
Live final	"Stars" (with Olly Murs)	Simply Red	Safe (1st)
Live final	"I'll Never Love Again"	Lady Gaga and Bradley Cooper	Winner

=== 2020-2023: New music and Up ===
On 12 March 2020, Hocking announced her debut single titled "After the Night Before". The release of the single was delayed due to the COVID-19 pandemic, and was eventually released on 6 November 2020, alongside an accompanying music video. Hocking performed the song on the semi-final of ninth series of The Voice UK. On 4 December 2020, it was announced that Hocking will support Olly Murs on his Summer 2021 UK Tour.

On 28 May 2021, Hocking released her new song "We Can Have the World Tonight".

On 19 October 2021, Hocking announced her debut EP called Up which was released on 26 October 2021.

On 31 December 2021, Hocking released the song called, "Alive".

On 22 June 2022, Hocking released the song called, "Bones".

=== 2024-present: Independent and new music ===
On 21 June 2024 Molly Hocking released her song, "You Can't Hold Me Down" independently. Having been through the major label process, not being allowed to record or release music, Molly exited her agreement with Polydor. "You Can't Hold Me Down" was written at Hoxa HQ in London in which she shares her experiences in the record industry, the ups and the downs.

The music single launch party was held at Tileyard London. Molly continues to write more music for release throughout 2024.

On 5 October 2024, Hocking announced her new single "The Upside". The song was released on 18 October 2024.

== Discography ==
=== Extended plays ===
Title	Details
Up	Released: 26 October 2021; Label: Love Molly Music; Formats: digital download, Streaming
Alive	Released: 31 December 2021; Label: Love Molly Music; Formats: Digital download, streaming
Christmas	Released: 18 November 2022; Label: Tristar Records; Formats: Digital download, streaming
Self Sabotage	Released: 03 October 2026; Label: GoldCrush Records; Formats: Digital download, streaming

=== Singles ===
List of singles, with selected details and chart positions
Title	Year	Peak chart positions	Album
Title	Year	UK	Album
"I'll Never Love Again"	2019	73	Non-album singles
"After the Night Before"	2020	— (Note: "After The Night Before" did not enter the UK Singles Chart, but peaked at number 21 on the UK Singles Download Chart.)	Non-album singles
"We Can Have the World Tonight"	2021	—	Non-album singles
"Alive"	2021	—	Alive
"Bones"	2022	—	Non-album singles
"You Can't Hold Me Down"	2024	—	Non-album singles
"The Upside"	2024	—	Non-album singles
"Did You Want It At All?"	2024	—	Non-album singles
"History Repeating"	2025	—	Self Sabotage
"I’d Rather Lie	2026	—	Self Sabotage
"Wait For Me"	2026	—	Self Sabotage
"Self Sabotage"	2026	—	Self Sabotage

== Concert tours ==
=== Supporting ===
- Olly Murs - Summer Tour (2021)
