= Nicole Raquel Dennis =

British musical theatre performer and singer

Nicole Raquel Dennis (born 23 April 1994) is a British musical theatre performer and singer. They are best known as one of the contestants on season eight of The Voice UK and for playing Effie White in the first UK tour of the musical Dreamgirls.

== Musical theatre ==
They were part of the ensemble and covered the role of Nurse Norma when the musical Waitress opened in London in 2019. The show closed in March 2020 and did not reopen the following year, due to the COVID-19 pandemic.

In 2017 Dennis joined the cast of the UK premiere of Dreamgirls, playing at the Savoy Theatre until January 2019 and starring Amber Riley in the role of Effie White. The show was directed and choreographed by Casey Nicholaw. After Riley's departure from the show in November 2017, the role of Effie was covered by Moya Angela, Marisha Wallace and Karen Mav.

During the pandemic Dennis took part in a concert version of Hair, directed by Arlene Phillips in West End's London Palladium in June 2021 (rescheduled from April 2021).

Dennis played Effie White in the UK tour of Dreamgirls from January 2022 until February 2023 ending its run in Hull. In October-November 2023 they played Martha Percy in the UK Tour of Treason

== Theatre credits ==
Year	Title	Role	Theatre
2016-2017	The Book of Mormon	Ensemble	Prince of Wales Theatre
2017-2019	Dreamgirls	first cover Effie White	Savoy Theatre
Mar - Sept 2019	Waitress	Ensemble and cover Nurse Norma	Adelphi Theatre
Nov 2019 - Mar 2020	Dear Evan Hansen	Alana Beck	Noël Coward Theatre
2021	Hair The Musical in Concert		London Palladium
2021-2023	Dreamgirls	Effie White	UK tour
2023	Treason	Martha Percy	UK Tour
2024	Lifeline	Amalia Fleming	Signature Theatre, Off-Broadway

== Awards ==
In 2020 Dennis won the Black British Theatre Award (BBTA) for Best Supporting Actress in a Musical for her role in Dear Evan Hansen. The ceremony took place at the Young Vic Theatre as a socially distanced event and was broadcast on Sky Arts.

In 2022 Dennis won the BBTA in the category LGBTQIA+ Champion for their work on the fundraising streaming event Turn Up at Cadogan Hall in support of the Black Lives Matter movement. The event streamed for three days in July 2020 and was co-created with Ryan Carter. It included sung performances as well as readings, poetry and speeches from performers and figures in the Black community. Among the performers were Melanie La Barrie, Alexia Khadime, Norm Lewis, Trevor Dion Nicholas, Ciara Renee, Danielle Steers and Layton Williams.

== Music career ==
Dennis was a contestant on the TV programme The Voice UK during its eight season in 2019. They choose Jennifer Hudson as their coach, after Hudson, Tom Jones and Olly Murs all turned their chairs at Dennis's performance of the song Never Enough, from the movie The Greatest Showman. Hudson and Dennis also performed "And I am Telling You" from Dreamgirls, as both had previously performed the role of Effie White, Hudson in the movie version of the show in 2006 and Dennis on the West End.

During episode three they battled against teammate Luke Swatman with the song "Your Song", winning the round and moving to the knockout phase of the programme, starting on Saturday 16 March 2019. Dennis was saved by their coach and moved to the Live shows.

Dennis was eliminated during week 1 of the live shows, coming in seventh out of the nine remaining contestants.
