= Lifeline (musical) =

2024 musical about Alexander Fleming

Lifeline (formerly The Mould That Changed the World) is a biographical musical produced by Charades Theatre Company about Alexander Fleming, with a score by Robin Hiley and a book by Becky Hope-Palmer. Lifeline addresses antimicrobial resistance and casts scientists and medical professionals as its chorus alongside a professional cast.

The musical depicts the history of Alexander Fleming alongside a modern day storyline focusing a junior doctor, Jess, and her attempts to save her childhood sweetheart, Aaron, a musician who has an antibiotic resistant hospital-acquired infection.

== Performance timeline ==
Written originally as a musical for school children to perform, it originated at the Edinburgh Festival Fringe in 2018 as a sung through one act musical about Alexander Fleming in the Surgeons' Hall. In 2022, it was revived having been adapted into a full length musical with a book by Thomas Henderson, where it achieve another sell-out run at the Edinburgh Fringe and toured to Washington DC at Atlas Theatre and Atlanta, playing at the Pullman Yards.

In 2024, with a new book from Becky Hope-Palmer, and directed by Alex Howarth, it went up for a 5-week run in Signature Theatre, with a new title and plot line involving new modern day characters. During its run, it became the first musical to ever perform a number in the United Nations during a special conference on antimicrobial resistance.

In addition to the musical, a concept album was released in July 2024 on Broadway Records featuring Nathan Salstone, Aaron Lazar, Arielle Jacobs, Mia Gerachis and Jay Armstrong Johnson and an accompanying podcast, The Lifeline Project, was created to talk the stories and science behind the show.

== Cast ==
Character	Off-Broadway 2024	Off-West End 2026
Alexander Fleming	Matthew Malthouse	Alan Vicary
Jess Irvine	Kirsty McClaren	Maz McGinlay
Aaron/Clowes	Scott McClure	Nathan Salstone
Amalia Fleming	Nicole Raquel Dennis	Kelly Glyptis
Pryce/Julian	Robbie Scott	Robbie Scott
Leyla	Mari McGinlay	Helen Logan
Nurse Sarah/Jean Irvine	Sarah Haddath	Jasmine Jules Andrews
Ensemble	Richard Lounds	Hannah Visocchi
Ensemble	Graham Richardson	Kieran Brown
