= What the Hell Just Happened? =

2025 song by Remember Monday

Single by Remember Monday
- Released: 7 March 2025
- Genre: Country pop; power pop
- Length: 2:58
- Label: The Other Songs
- Songwriters: Charlotte Steele; Holly-Anne Hull; Julie Aagaard; Kes Kamara; Lauren Byrne; Sam Brennan; Thomas Stengaard; Tom Hollings
- Producer: Billen Ted

Remember Monday singles chronology
"Famous" (2024)	"What the Hell Just Happened?" (2025)	"Happier" (2025)

Music video
- "What the Hell Just Happened?" on YouTube

Eurovision Song Contest 2025 entry
- Country: United Kingdom
- Artist: Remember Monday
- Language: English
- Composers: Charlotte Steele; Holly-Anne Hull; Julie Aagaard; Kes Kamara; Lauren Byrne; Sam Brennan; Thomas Stengaard; Tom Hollings
- Lyricists: Charlotte Steele; Holly-Anne Hull; Julie Aagaard; Kes Kamara; Lauren Byrne; Sam Brennan; Thomas Stengaard; Tom Hollings

Finals performance
- Final result: 19th
- Final points: 88

Entry chronology
- ◄ "Dizzy" (2024)
- "Eins, Zwei, Drei" (2026) ►

"What the Hell Just Happened?" is a song by British country pop group Remember Monday. A track reflecting the group's real-life dynamic of providing mutual support during challenging situations, the song was released on 7 March 2025 through the independent label The Other Songs. It was written by group members Charlotte Steele, Holly-Anne Hull and Lauren Byrne, together with Julie Aagaard, Kes Kamara, Sam Brennan, Thomas Stengaard and Tom Hollings. It represented the United Kingdom in the Eurovision Song Contest 2025, marking the first song by a girl group to represent the country since 1999.

Critical response to "What the Hell Just Happened?" was generally mixed, especially regarding its blending of genres. Some reviewers praised its energetic fusion of musical styles, lyrics, strong vocal harmonies, and influences from other artists, while others criticised the song's rapid genre shifts as disjointed and lacking cohesion. Critics were also divided about its suitability for the Eurovision stage. In the contest, it placed 19th of 26, with 88 points from the juries and no points in the public vote.

"What the Hell Just Happened?" became Remember Monday's first single to enter the UK Singles Chart, peaking at number 31 after the contest. The song also peaked at number seven on the UK Independent Singles Charts, as well as entering the charts in Lithuania and Switzerland.

== Background and composition ==
"What the Hell Just Happened?" was written by Remember Monday, in collaboration with Julie Aagaard, Kes Kamara, Thomas Stengaard, and the songwriting duo Billen Ted, namely Sam Brennan and Tom Hollings. Lyrically, the group described the song as presenting a "quite autobiographical" account of friendship and post-night-out disorientation, with the trio explaining it reflects their shared experiences of emotional support during difficult moments. Following the release of the song, the group said: "'What The Hell Just Happened' is exactly how we’re feeling right now! It's all very surreal; our friendship goes so far back, and we definitely never imagined that we'd be doing anything like this."

Further, Mark Savage, a writer from the BBC, described the song as follows: "Try to imagine, if you can, that ABBA and Sam Ryder have teamed up with the cast of Six: The Musical, got blackout drunk and tried to recreate 'Bohemian Rhapsody' from memory."

Remember Monday are the first girl group to represent the United Kingdom since 1999, when Precious entered the contest with the song "Say It Again".

== Music video and release ==
Along with the song's release, an accompanying music video was released on the official YouTube channel of the Eurovision Song Contest on the same day. Directed by Rupert Bryan, it was filmed in Hollybank House, Emsworth. Later that evening, Remember Monday appeared on a first exclusive TV interview on BBC One's The One Show, which featured the first full televised broadcast of the music video. Writing for Promonews, Rob Ulitski described the video as "a fiesty performance showcase, complete with period-era styling and a playful romp around a luxurious home".

== Promotion ==
To promote "What the Hell Just Happened?" before the Eurovision Song Contest 2025, Remember Monday announced their intent to participate in various Eurovision pre-parties. It was first announced that they will be performing at Eurovision in Concert 2025 held at AFAS Live Arena in Amsterdam on 5 April 2025. Further, they performed at the London Eurovision Party 2025 on 13 April 2025 held at Here at Outernet. The group also participated at PrePartyES 2025 on 19 April 2025 held at Sala La Riviera in Madrid.

On 24 March 2025, Remember Monday made an acoustic live performance for an assembled press at an event held at Theatre Royal, Drury Lane. Billy Webber, co-founder of The Other Songs, the group's record label, also announced that they undertook a promotional tour across Europe, which started following their attendance at Eurovision in Concert 2025. The band visited Denmark, where they have done press events, Norway, where they appeared on the Norwegian current affairs programme God morgen Norge, and Iceland, where they recorded the song "Husavik (My Hometown)" in the namesake town. After performing at the London Eurovision Party 2025, Remember Monday traveled to Ireland for various media appearances, including an interview on Virgin Media One's The Six O'Clock Show.

Following their participation in the Eurovision pre-parties, the group were interviewed on The Capital Evening Show with Jimmy Hill. On 2 May 2025, they appeared on BBC One's The One Show, performing the song for the first time on live television.

== Critical reception ==
Professional ratings
Review scores
Source	Rating
The Independent	4/5 stars
The Telegraph	4/5 stars
The Times	4/5 stars
Yle	5/10

=== British media and personalities ===
"What the Hell Just Happened?" received mixed assessments from music critics. Neil McCormick from The Telegraph, Roisin O'Connor from The Independent, and Ed Potton from The Times gave the song four out of five stars. McCormick called the track "a breathless pop pastiche of imperial period Queen with a dash of Elton John singing country with the Andrews Sisters". He also described the song's lyrics "a witty account of waking up the morning after a night before in comedic disarray". O'Connor commended the song's production, describing it as "full of fun and flair", with "dramatic piano crescendos, squalling guitar riffs, and bombastic blasts of synth". She further commented that the song "sounds like a result of a drunken one-night stand" between "Bat Out of Hell" by Meat Loaf and "Pink Pony Club" by Chappell Roan. Potton applauded the group's vocal harmonies and describing the track as having "shades of The Last Dinner Party, before an audacious tonal shift to urgent pop that’s worthy of Girls Aloud in their pomp, and cries of 'Freedom!' that bring to mind George Michael".

Writing for the British newspaper Metro, Robert Oliver also gave the song a positive review, dubbing the song as an "ambitious vocal masterclass" that the group are "sure to match on the night of the Eurovision grand final", and further describing it as "hyperactive and fidgety pop, trying to keep a smile on its face despite a crippling hangover". In an article for Attitude, Dale Fox called the song a "country-pop earworm" which "lands somewhere between The Chicks and Fearless-era Taylor Swift, with an anthemic chorus that sounds built for the Eurovision stage". Jo Forrest from TotalNtertainment described the track as "brimming with fun and infectious energy, a dancefloor-filler that relatably narrates a raucous night out with friends". Jo Twist, chief executive of the British Phonographic Industry, and Wlll Hodgkinson from The Times both mentioned that the growing presence of country music in the United Kingdom was further highlighted by choosing "What the Hell Just Happened?" as the country's Eurovision entry.

On the other hand, Tom Morton from National World criticised the song for its chaotic, shapeshifting mix of genres and styles, transitioning rapidly between vocal harmonies, synth-pop, and soft rock. While he described the lyrics as a "girlpower Taylor Swift personal diary intimate confessional vibes" with a "carpe diem theme", he also added that the song "feels like it's been written by committee, not by a songwriter, or as if AI was told to assemble music from a list of prompts which might attract Eurovision votes". Ed Power from The i Paper also gave the track a negative review, describing it as a song "you don't hum, much less listen to again and again"; instead calling it "a plea for Eurovision to sit up and pay attention". He also dubbed the song as having a "subtlety-deficient chorus barely 30 seconds in".

In a critique for CNN, Rob Picheta ranked the song 24th out of the 26 finalists, praising the vocal abilities of Remember Monday but expressed concerns about the song's overall presentation. He described the track as "dreadful", with staging he found underwhelming and a change-of-pace chorus that "grows tiresome fast". Picheta noted that the song’s theme and style appeared outdated, reminiscent of early 2010s pop trends associated with artists like Kesha and Katy Perry. Good Morning Britain host Charlotte Hawkins, in an interview with 2025 Swedish representatives KAJ, dismissed the United Kingdom’s Eurovision chances, stating, "we know the UK aren’t going to win", and calling victory "a tall order".

=== Eurovision-related and other media ===
Harmen van Dijk, Peter van der Lint, and Nienke Schipper from the Dutch newspaper Trouw described the song as "musically well-constructed" and called it as "one of the better entries from the United Kingdom in recent years". Eva Frantz from the Finnish broadcaster Yle gave the song a mixed review, stating that while the band has the vocal ability, the different directions that the song takes felt like a cut-and-paste of "at least seven different songs". Similarly, Jon O'Brien from Vulture, ranking the song 28th, praised the group's vocal delivery but panned the song as an incohesive blend of styles, comparing it to "Taylor Swift-esque confessional, Broadway show tune, or a The Last Dinner Party–style display of middle-class girl power". Described as a "Frankenstein's mess of an entry", O'Brien described the track as failing to successfully execute any of these approaches.

== Eurovision Song Contest 2025 ==
=== Internal selection ===
The United Kingdom's broadcaster for the Eurovision Song Contest, the British Broadcasting Corporation (BBC), announced its intention to participate in the Eurovision Song Contest 2025 on 16 October 2024, confirming an internal selection led by Andrew Cartmell, who was appointed as the head of delegation for the country, and David May, who previously served as manager for Sam Ryder, who finished in second place for the United Kingdom in 2022.

On 29 January 2025, during The Scott Mills Breakfast Show on BBC Radio 2, Scott Mills confirmed that the British entry had already been selected and that work was underway in its final presentation. On 7 February 2025, BBC Radio 1 hosts Natalie O'Leary and Vicky Hawkesworth stated that Remember Monday had been selected to represent the United Kingdom in Basel; the BBC did not respond to the speculation. On 7 March 2025, during The Scott Mills Breakfast Show, Remember Monday were officially confirmed as the British representatives with the song "What the Hell Just Happened?".

=== At Eurovision ===
The Eurovision Song Contest 2025 took place at St. Jakobshalle in Basel, Switzerland, and consisted of two semi-finals held on the respective dates of 13 and 15 May, with the final on 17 May 2025. As the United Kingdom is a member of the "Big Five", "What the Hell Just Happened?" automatically qualified for the grand final. Nevertheless, the song was performed in the second semi-final albeit in a non-competitive spot, between Austria's JJ and Greece's Klavdia.

For their Eurovision performance, Ace Bowerman served as the creative director for the song's staging, with Japanese-Brazilian choreographer Jorge Antonio Fujizaki choreographing the performance. The group wore Bridgerton-style Regency outfits with a coordinated pastel colour scheme, with Byrne, Steele, and Hull wearing pale blue, yellow, and pink, respectively.

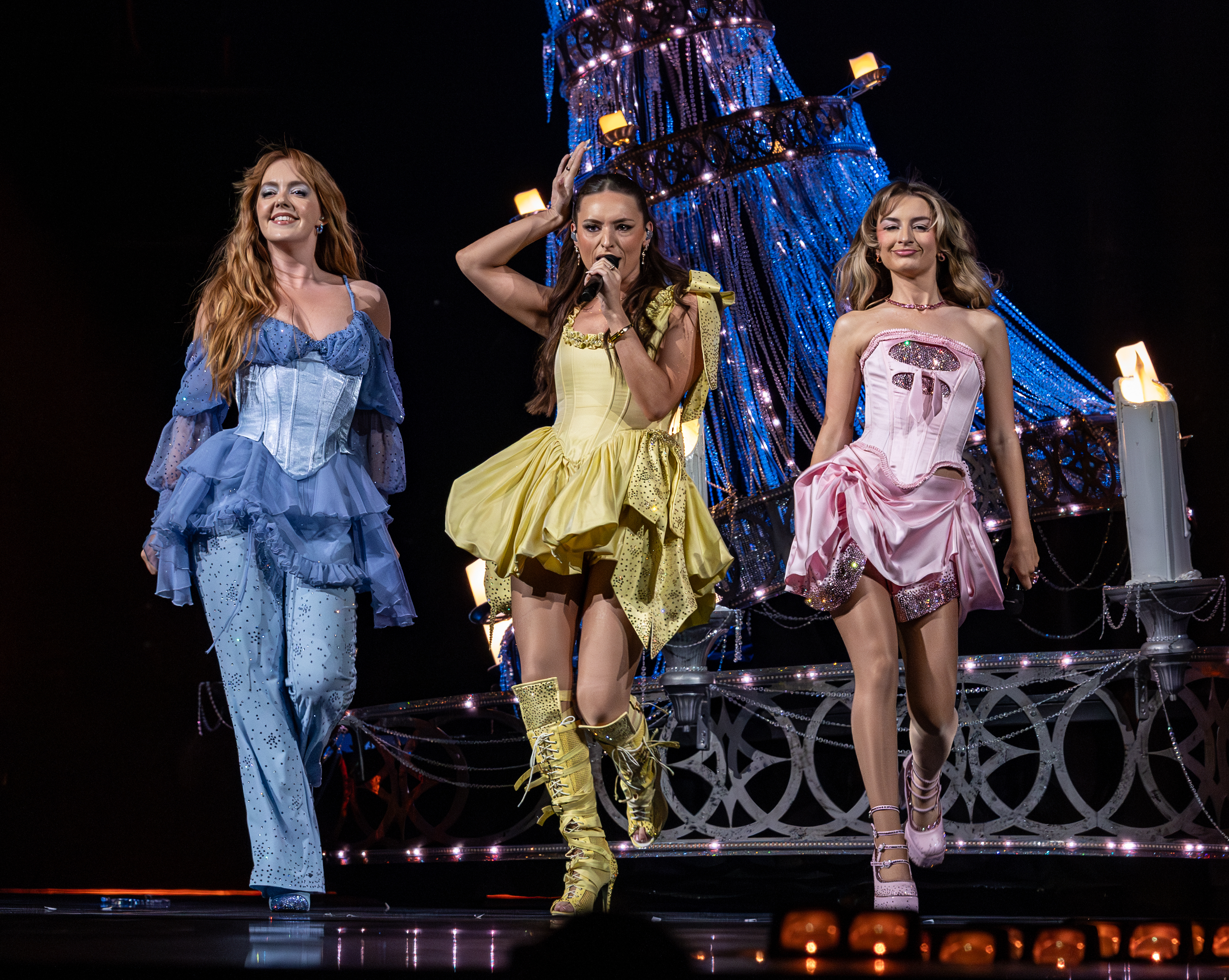
Remember Monday performing "What the Hell Just Happened?" during the Eurovision 2025 second semi-final

The staging opened with the trio in a Regency-style boudoir, before the first chorus brought a burst of movement as they moved down a catwalk built into the main stage, staged as a flashback to the previous night. The main set piece was a large prop chandelier, around two and a half to three metres tall and decorated with candles, positioned at the centre of the stage on its side as though it had fallen, and lit in changing colours for the rest of the performance. As the song reached its climax, the stage was plunged into darkness before the lights returned on the group back in the boudoir for a softer closing moment, framed through a heart-shaped opening cut into a padded screen.

Remember Monday performed a repeat of their performance in the grand final on 17 May. The song performed eighth, ahead of Ukraine's Ziferblat and before Austria's JJ. The group placed 19th overall, receiving 88 points from the jury vote and zero points in the public vote. Regarding the former, the song received one set of 12 points given by Italy. This was the second year in a row where the United Kingdom received no points from the televote.

The day after the final, Remember Monday issued a statement on social media thanking fans and their team for their support and describing the competition as deeply emotional. They framed the result as "just the beginning" for the group, and announced a headline UK and Ireland tour, a run of festival dates, and a performance at Wembley Stadium's Summertime Ball later that year.

== Credits and personnel ==
Musicians

- Remember Monday – lead vocals
- Sam Brennan – programming, piano, brass
- Kes Kamara – synthesiser, percussion
- Tom Hollings – strings, bass guitar
- Gareth Grover – drums
- Nick Hollings – electric guitar

Technical

- Dan Grech-Marguerat – mastering, mixing
- Billen Ted – production

== Track listing ==
Digital download/streaming

1. "What the Hell Just Happened?" – 2:56

Digital download/streaming – Remixes EP

1. "What the Hell Just Happened? (Journey by a DJ remix)" – 4:33
2. "What the Hell Just Happened? (Dougal McGregor remix)" – 2:20
3. "What the Hell Just Happened? (Marcus Wiles remix)" – 2:33
4. "What the Hell Just Happened? (Warren Meyers remix)" – 3:46
5. "What the Hell Just Happened?" – 2:56

== Charts ==
Chart performance for "What the Hell Just Happened?"
Chart (2025)	Peak position
Lithuania (AGATA)	70
Switzerland (Schweizer Hitparade)	77
UK Singles (Official Charts)	31
UK Indie (Official Charts)	7

== Release history ==
Release history and formats for "What the Hell Just Happened?"
Region	Date	Format(s)	Version	Label	Ref.
Various	7 March 2025	Digital download; streaming	Original	The Other Songs	
Italy	12 March 2025	Radio airplay	Original	The Other Songs	
Various	30 May 2025	Digital download; streaming	Remixes EP	The Other Songs	
