= Sixth Form College, Farnborough =

The Sixth Form College Farnborough

Location
- Prospect Avenue; Farnborough, Hampshire, GU14 8JX; England; 51°18′17″N 0°45′22″W

Information
- Type: Sixth form college
- Motto: Learn, Enjoy, Achieve
- Established: 1936
- Local authority: Hampshire
- Trust: The Prospect Trust
- Department for Education URN: 145057 Tables
- Ofsted: Reports
- Principal: Zoe Smallman
- Gender: Coeducational
- Age: 16 to 19
- Website: https://www.farnborough.ac.uk

The Sixth Form College Farnborough is a sixth form college situated in Farnborough, Hampshire, England. It caters for around 3,915 students and admission is mostly from schools in the local areas of Surrey, Hampshire and Berkshire. The college is often referred to as 'Farnborough Sixth' to differentiate it from Farnborough College of Technology.

== Awards ==
In 2006, the college ranked third place in the school league table for Hampshire, achieving a higher ranking for A-Level results than several highly regarded independent and private schools in the area.

In 2007, the college was rated 'outstanding' by Ofsted, and it retains Beacon Status as one of the country’s top sixth form colleges. The college was rated 'outstanding' again in 2021.

== History ==
The college was founded as the Farnborough Grammar School in September 1936, when the Aldershot County High School outgrew its premises and the boys were relocated to Farnborough.

The Sixth Form College was created from 1974 to 1978, gradually enlarging as the number of grammar school pupils reduced. Since being incorporated as a sixth form college in 1992, it has grown fast from 1,180 full-time students in 1992 to now having over 3000.

John J Guy was the principal from 1992 to 2010. He served on a number of government committees, including the Tomlinson Committee on 14–19 reform, and in 2001 was awarded the OBE for services to education.

He was succeeded as principal in September 2010 by the college's deputy principal, Simon Jarvis.

In February 2018, it was announced that Catherine Cole, deputy principal (student services), would succeed Simon Jarvis when he stepped down as principal (but would continue as CEO of the Prospect Trust) in September 2018.

Catherine Cole stepped down as principal of the college at the end of the 2022–2023 academic year. She was replaced by Zoe Smallman.

On 19 November 2024, the school was placed into lockdown twice as a result of bomb threats allegedly from a 40 year old man from Farnborough, whom the police arrested on the same day.

== College facilities ==
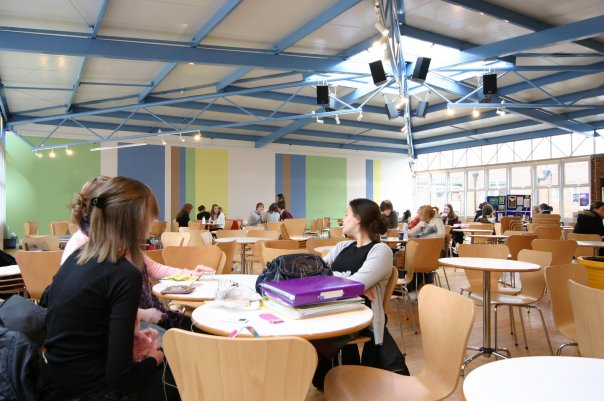
Cafe Direct, one of three canteens

The college has undergone a major building programme costing over £15 million. The first project was the Prospect Theatre and performing arts suite, which was opened by Prince Edward, Earl of Wessex in 2000. Also, the Dame Kelly Holmes Sports Centre was opened on 25 April 2007 by the double Olympic gold medallist. The developments have also seen the construction of a brand new quad built in the centre of the college, and the Whitehouse Building which boasts an e-Assessment Centre – an IT centre for students to use. The John Guy Building is a new block which replaced the former 1960s Scola block. The John Guy Building was opened by the Secretary of State for Education, Michael Gove in 2010 and houses the physics, computing, arts and photographic departments. It was given a BREEAM 'Excellent' rating. The college has three cafeterias: Café Direct, TimeOut and Shades. The college also has two large fields which are used for sports and recreational purposes. The latest building is the Simon Jarvis lecture theatre attached to the Ranson building, which was opened in September 2018.

== Enrichment ==
The college has established links with Presbyterian Secondary Technical School, Aburi, Ghana. This project is called the Ghana Link and it aims to broaden students from both schools' horizons and develop a two way partnership that would be of benefit to both parties.

The college also has links with the German town of Oberursel and its secondary school. There is an annual exchange program for students studying German.

In March 2000, Prince Edward opened the new £2.5 million Performing Arts Centre incorporating the modern 300-seat Prospect Theatre and teaching suites for music, dance and drama. One of the music enrichments making use of this facility is the biannual college Opera Project, where full-scale operas are performed by students. In 2006, the college staged The Marriage of Figaro by Mozart. A performance of Engelbert Humperdinck's Hansel and Gretel took place in July 2008.

== Notable alumni ==
- Nicholas Hoult, actor
- Carla Denyer, member of Parliament for Bristol Central, and former leader of the Green Party of England and Wales
- Grace Blakeley, journalist
- Remember Monday, girl band, who represented the UK in Eurovision 2025
- Jessica Castles, gymnast
- Victoria Atkin, former Hollyoaks actress

=== Farnborough Grammar School ===
- Stephen Timms, government minister, Labour MP since 1997 for East Ham and from 1994–7 for Newham North East
- Michael Whelan, professor of microscopy of materials from 1992–7 at the Department of Materials, University of Oxford
- Alan Clayson, musician and author
