= The Voice UK series 8 =

Eighth series of The Voice UK

The Voice UK
- Series 8
- Hosted by: Emma Willis; AJ Odudu (ITV Hub & YouTube)
- Coaches: will.i.am; Jennifer Hudson; Sir Tom Jones; Olly Murs
- Winner: Molly Hocking
- Winning mentor: Olly Murs
- Runner-up: Deana Walmsley
- No. of episodes: 14

Release
- Original network: ITV; ITV Hub/YouTube (The V Room)
- Original release: 5 January – 6 April 2019

Series chronology
- ← Previous; Series 7 Next → Series 9

The Voice UK is a British television music competition to find new singing talent. The eighth series began airing on 5 January 2019 and concluded on 6 April 2019, presented by Emma Willis on ITV. will.i.am, Jennifer Hudson, Sir Tom Jones and Olly Murs returned for their eighth, third, seventh and second series, respectively.

On 6 April 2019, Molly Hocking was announced the winner of the series, marking Olly Murs' first win as coach.

== Coaches ==
Coaches for series 8 of The Voice UK

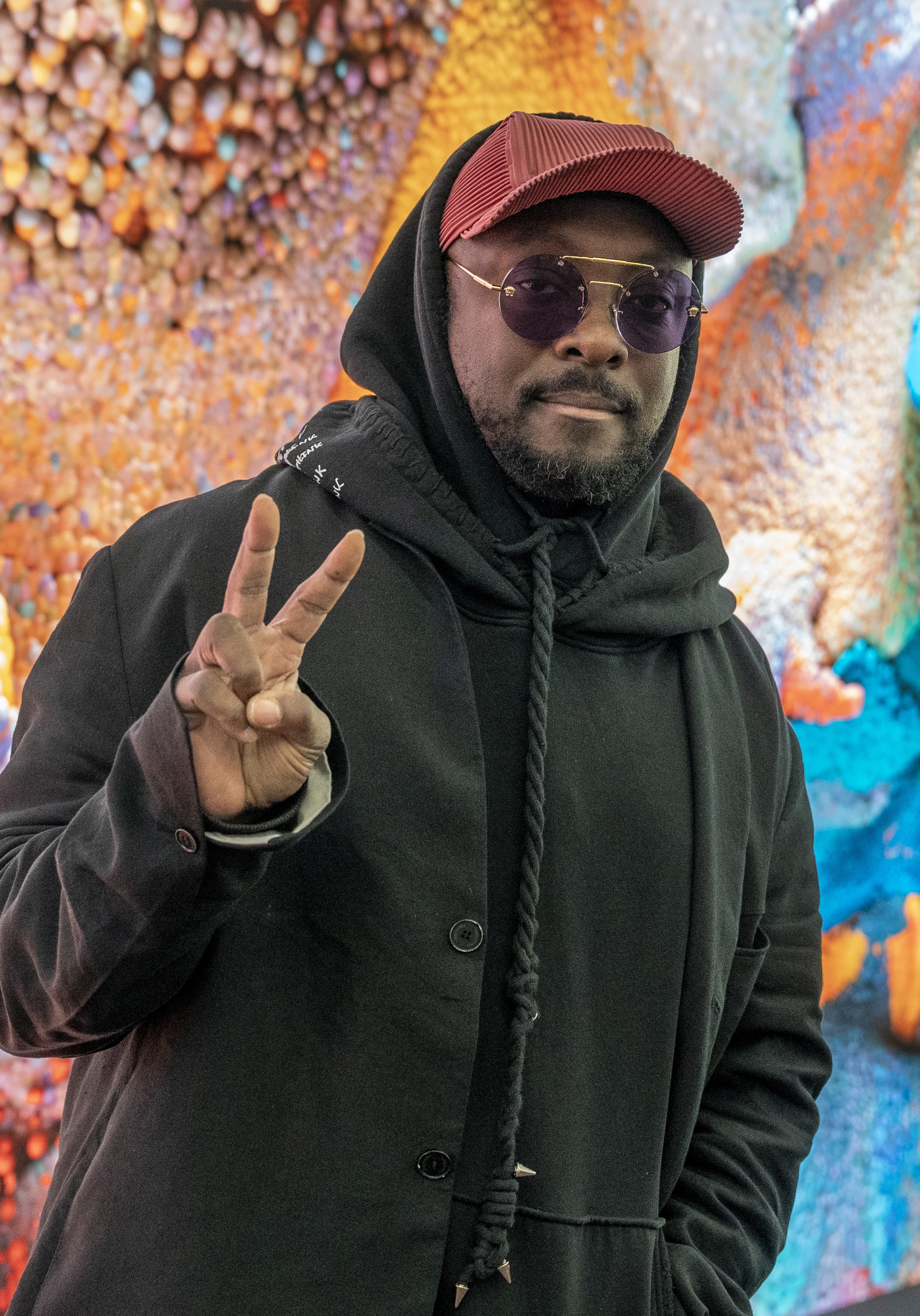
will.i.am

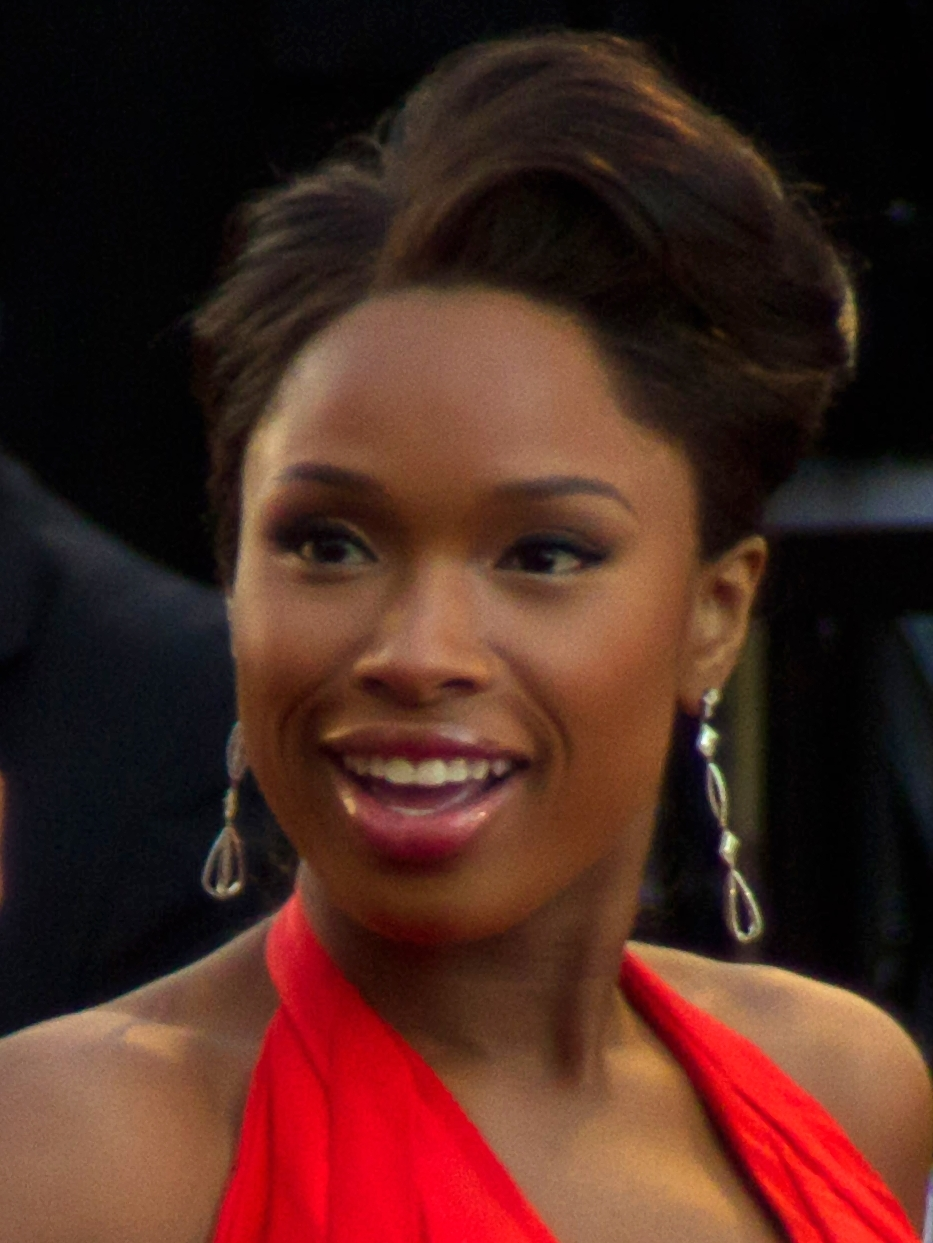
Jennifer Hudson

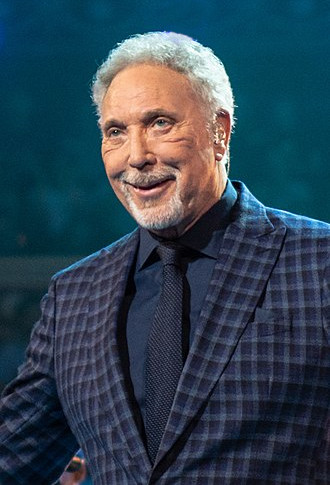
Sir Tom Jones

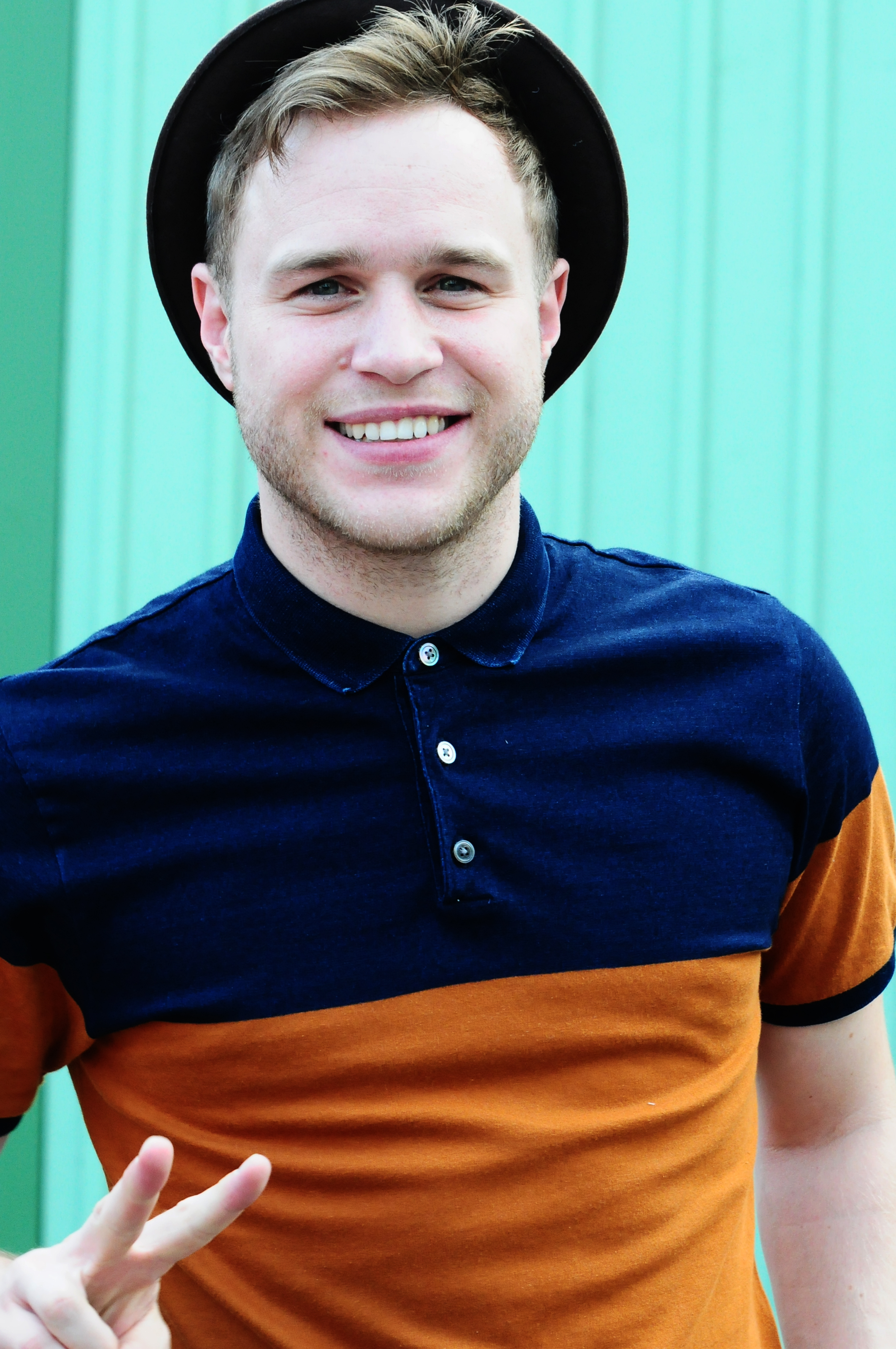
Olly Murs

On 1 November 2018, it was announced that Vick Hope (last series' backstage reporter and The V Room host) would be replaced by AJ Odudu.

On 9 March 2019, the guest mentors for the knockout round were announced to be: James Arthur to help Sir Tom Jones, Nicole Scherzinger to help will.i.am, Olly Alexander (of Years & Years) to help Jennifer Hudson and Anne-Marie to help Olly Murs.

== Teams ==
Colour key:

- Winner
- Runner-up
- Third place
- Fourth place
- Eliminated in the Semi-Final
- Eliminated in the Knockouts
- Artist was stolen by another coach at the Battles
- Eliminated in the Battles

Coach	Top 40 Artists					
will.i.am						
will.i.am	Emmanuel Smith	NXTGEN	Christina Ellinas	Ilianna	Gabriel Dryss	Callum Butterworth
will.i.am	Shivon Kane	Seth Oraeki	Khadija	Nyema Kalfon	Brieya May	
Jennifer Hudson						
Jennifer Hudson	Nicole Dennis	Moya	Sarah Tucker	Remember Monday	Bukky Oronti	Connie Lamb
Jennifer Hudson	~~Bethzienna Williams~~	Luke Swatman	Craig Forsyth	Gisela Green	Kieron Smith	
Sir Tom Jones						
Sir Tom Jones	Deana Walmsley	Bethzienna Williams	Cedric Neal	Ayanam Udoma	Roger Samuels	Equip to Overcome
Sir Tom Jones	~~Jimmy Balito~~	Grace Latchford	Marina Simioni	Peter Donegan	Mike Platt	
Olly Murs						
Olly Murs	Molly Hocking	Jimmy Balito	Stefan Mahendra	Georgia Bray	Harrisen Larner-Main	Eva Campbell
Olly Murs	~~Callum Butterworth~~	~~Connie Lamb~~	Lauren Hope	Nikki Ambers	Flat Pack	

== Blind auditions ==
It was announced by ITV that the eighth series would begin broadcasting on 5 January 2019.

Colour key

✔	Coach hit his/her "I WANT YOU" button
	Artist defaulted to this coach's team
	Artist elected to join this coach's team
	Artist eliminated with no coach pressing his or her "I WANT YOU" button
	Artist Received an "All Turn"

=== Episode 1 (5 January) ===
The series premiere aired on from 8:30pm until 9:35pm.

Artist	Order	Age	Song	Coaches and artists choices			
Artist	Order	Age	Song	will.i.am	JHud	Tom	Olly
Mike Platt	1	32	"Show Me Heaven"	✔	✔	✔	✔
Heidi Lewis	2	17	"Lost Without You"	—	—	—	—
Remember Monday	3	24	"Kiss from a Rose"	✔	✔	✔	✔
Brieya May	4	16	"Can't Take My Eyes Off You"	✔	—	—	✔
Liam Walker	5	36	"Landslide"	—	—	—	—
Peter Donegan	6	35	"Bless the Broken Road"	—	—	✔	—
Molly Hocking	7	17	"You Take My Breath Away"	—	✔	✔	✔
Nicole Dennis	8	24	"Never Enough"	—	✔	✔	✔

=== Episode 2 (12 January) ===
Artist	Order	Age	Song	Coaches and artists choices			
Artist	Order	Age	Song	will.i.am	JHud	Tom	Olly
Bukky Oronti	1	16	"Say Something"	✔	✔	—	—
Dean Mac	2	27	"Pony"	—	—	—	—
Connie Lamb	3	17	"Skyscraper"	—	—	✔	✔
Cedric Neal	4	43	"Higher Ground"	✔	✔	✔	✔
Chris Daley	5	35	"Lucky Man"	—	—	—	—
Flat Pack	6	36-43	"Luck Be a Lady"	—	—	—	✔
Grace Latchford	7	17	"Love Says"	—	—	✔	—
Emmanuel Smith	8	29	"Hallelujah"	✔	✔	✔	✔

=== Episode 3 (19 January) ===
Artist	Order	Age	Song	Coaches and artists choices			
Artist	Order	Age	Song	will.i.am	JHud	Tom	Olly
Luke Swatman	1	35	"Il Mare Calmo Della Sera"	—	✔	—	✔
Christina Ellinas	2	27	"Lullaby"	✔	—	✔	✔
Lauz	3	17	"A Little Less Conversation"	—	—	—	—
Harrisen Larner-Main	4	25	"Have a Little Faith in Me"	—	✔	—	✔
Holly Lefevre	5	23	"You Are the Reason"	—	—	—	—
Jimmy Balito	6	23	"Higher Love"	—	✔	✔	—
NXTGEN	7	21	"Cry Me a River"	✔	—	—	✔
Sarah Tucker	8	34	"In My Blood"	✔	✔	✔	✔

=== Episode 4 (26 January) ===
Artist	Order	Age	Song	Coaches and artists choices			
Artist	Order	Age	Song	will.i.am	JHud	Tom	Olly
Eden Kavanagh	1	24	"They Just Keep Moving The Line"	—	—	—	—
Callum Butterworth	2	17	"Mercy"	—	—	—	✔
Stefan Mahendra	3	23	"Redbone"	—	✔	—	✔
Robin Martin	4	41	"You Gotta Be"	—	—	—	—
Jack Morlen	5	23	"Scared to Be Lonely"	—	—	—	—
Ilianna	6	21	"Location"	✔	—	—	—
Craig Forsyth	7	28	"The Impossible Dream"	—	✔	—	—
Bethzienna Williams	8	28	"Cry to Me"	—	✔	—	—
Roger Samuels	9	43	"Footprints in the Sand"	—	✔	✔	—

=== Episode 5 (2 February) ===
Artist	Order	Age	Song	Coaches and artists choices			
Artist	Order	Age	Song	will.i.am	JHud	Tom	Olly
Equip To Overcome	1	20	"Blinded by Your Grace, Pt. 2"	✔	✔	✔	—
Sherie Harthill	2	37	"Super Duper Love (Are You Diggin' on Me)"	—	—	—	—
Eva Campbell	3	16	"Teardrop"	—	—	—	✔
Khadija	4	21	"Underwater Love"	✔	—	—	—
Craig Roystone	5	21	"This Is The Last Time"	—	—	—	—
Nikki Ambers	6	22	"Better Now"	—	—	✔	✔
Seth Oraeki	7	17	"Jealous"	✔	✔	—	—
Moya	8	27	"Grace"	✔	✔	✔	✔

=== Episode 6 (9 February) ===
Artist	Order	Age	Song	Coaches and artists choices			
Artist	Order	Age	Song	will.i.am	JHud	Tom	Olly
Nyema Kalfon	1	22	"Answerphone"	✔	—	✔	—
Gabriel Dryss	2	16	"Treasure"	✔	—	—	—
Clare McCulloch	3	34	"Hard to Handle"	—	—	—	—
Gisela Green	4	27	"Best Part"	✔	✔	—	✔
Stephanie Hill	5	24	"I Could Have Danced All Night"	—	—	—	—
Georgia Bray	6	21	"Firework"	—	—	—	✔
Jack Hawitt	7	29	"Diamonds"	—	—	—	—
Kenza Blanka	8	34	"Papaoutai"	—	—	—	—
Deana Walmsley	9	23	"Back to Black"	✔	—	✔	✔

=== Episode 7 (16 February) ===
Artist	Order	Age	Song	Coaches and artists choices			
Artist	Order	Age	Song	will.i.am	JHud	Tom	Olly
Shivon Kane	1	19	"Fine Line"	✔	—	—	—
Amy Hawthorn	2	29	"Best of My Love"	Team full	—	—	—
Philippa Akers	3	27	"Ain't Nobody"	Team full	—	—	—
Ayanam Udoma	4	27	"Wonderwall"	Team full	—	✔	—
Kieron Smith	5	26	"Drops of Jupiter (Tell Me)"	Team full	✔	—	—
Chloe Jones	6	25	"Call Me"	Team full	Team full	—	—
Ryan Simpson	7	25	"New Shoes"	Team full	Team full	—	—
GGMK	8	17	"Forget You"	Team full	Team full	—	—
Rainy Hall	9	32	"Run to You"	Team full	Team full	—	—
Lauren Hope	10	20	"Addicted to Love"	Team full	Team full	—	✔
Marina Simioni	11	27	"Show Me Love"	Team full	Team full	✔	Team full

== Battle rounds ==
Colour key

✔	Coach hit his/her "I WANT YOU" button
	Artist won the Battle and advanced to the Knockouts
	Artist lost the Battle but was stolen by another coach and advances to the Knockouts
	Artist lost the Battle and was eliminated

=== Episode 1 (23 February) ===
Order	Coach	Artists		Song	Coaches' and artists choices			
Order	Coach	Artists		Song	will.i.am	JHud	Tom	Olly
1	Sir Tom Jones	Cedric Neal	Mike Platt	"Jumpin' Jack Flash"	—	—	—N/a	—
2	will.i.am	Ilianna	Brieya May	"American Boy"	—N/a	—	—	—
3	Jennifer Hudson	Remember Monday	Kieron Smith	"Home"	—	—N/a	—	—
4	Olly Murs	Molly Hocking	Connie Lamb	"With You"	—	✔	—	—N/a
5	will.i.am	Christina Ellinas	Nyema Kalfon	"Confident"	—N/a	Team full	—	—
6	Olly Murs	Georgia Bray	Flat Pack	"Hit the Road Jack"	—	Team full	—	—N/a
7	Sir Tom Jones	Roger Samuels	Jimmy Balito	"Let It Be"	✔	Team full	—N/a	✔

=== Episode 2 (2 March) ===
Order	Coach	Artists		Song	Coaches' and artists choices			
Order	Coach	Artists		Song	will.i.am	JHud	Tom	Olly
1	will.i.am	Emmanuel Smith	Khadija	"Fallin'"	—N/a	Team full	—	Team full
2	Olly Murs	Eva Campbell	Callum Butterworth	"This Town"	✔	Team full	—	Team full
3	Jennifer Hudson	Moya	Bethzienna Williams	"Never Tear Us Apart"	Team full	Team full	✔	Team full
4	will.i.am	NXTGEN	Seth Oraeki	"Youngblood"	Team full	Team full	Team full	Team full
5	Jennifer Hudson	Bukky Oronti	Gisela Green	"Best Thing I Never Had"	Team full	Team full	Team full	Team full
6	Sir Tom Jones	Deana Walmsley	Peter Donegan	"Make You Feel My Love"	Team full	Team full	Team full	Team full

=== Episode 3 (9 March) ===
Order	Coach	Artists		Song	Coaches' and artists choices			
Order	Coach	Artists		Song	will.i.am	JHud	Tom	Olly
1	Sir Tom Jones	Equip to Overcome	Marina Simioni	"Team"	Team full	Team full	Team full	Team full
2	Olly Murs	Stefan Mahendra	Nikki Ambers	"We Don't Talk Anymore"	Team full	Team full	Team full	Team full
3	Sir Tom Jones	Ayanam Udoma	Grace Latchford	"Breakfast At Tiffany's"	Team full	Team full	Team full	Team full
4	Jennifer Hudson	Sarah Tucker	Craig Forsyth	"Against All Odds"	Team full	Team full	Team full	Team full
5	will.i.am	Gabriel Dryss	Shivon Kane	"Feels"	Team full	Team full	Team full	Team full
6	Olly Murs	Harrisen Larner-Main	Lauren Hope	"I Still Haven't Found What I'm Looking For"	Team full	Team full	Team full	Team full
7	JHud	Nicole Dennis	Luke Swatman	"Your Song"	Team full	Team full	Team full	Team full

== Knockouts ==
A new voting system called Lifeline vote was introduced this year, which would save one contestant from the 16 eliminated acts based on the public's vote. The act who was saved by lifeline vote would be revealed at the beginning of the live Semi-final.

=== Episode 1 (16 March) ===
Order	Coach	Artist	Song	Result
1	Sir Tom Jones	Deana Walmsley	"Dusk Till Dawn"	Advanced
2	Sir Tom Jones	Roger Samuels	"Grace"	Eliminated
3	Sir Tom Jones	Equip to Overcome	"When Love Takes Over"	Eliminated
1	Jennifer Hudson	Connie Lamb	"2002"	Eliminated
2	Jennifer Hudson	Moya	"Woman"	Advanced
3	Jennifer Hudson	Sarah Tucker	"The Edge of Glory"	Eliminated
1	will.i.am	NXTGEN	"Runnin' (Lose It All)"	Advanced
2	will.i.am	Callum Butterworth	"Mirrors"	Eliminated
3	will.i.am	Gabriel Dryss	"Just Got Paid"	Eliminated
1	Olly Murs	Eva Campbell	"Unstoppable"	Eliminated
2	Olly Murs	Harrisen Larner-Main	"You Get What You Give"	Eliminated
3	Olly Murs	Jimmy Balito	"High and Dry"	Advanced

=== Episode 2 (23 March) ===
Order	Coach	Artist	Song	Result
1	Olly Murs	Georgia Bray	"Black and Gold"	Eliminated
2	Olly Murs	Molly Hocking	"Human"	Advanced
3	Olly Murs	Stefan Mahendra	"God Is a Woman"	Eliminated
1	Jennifer Hudson	Nicole Dennis	"Because of You"	Advanced
2	Jennifer Hudson	Remember Monday	"Jailbreaker"	Eliminated
3	Jennifer Hudson	Bukky Oronti	"Set Fire to the Rain"	Eliminated
1	will.i.am	Ilianna	"Street Life"	Eliminated
2	will.i.am	Emmanuel Smith	"Made a Way"	Advanced
3	will.i.am	Christina Ellinas	"Pretty Hurts"	Eliminated
1	Sir Tom Jones	Ayanam Udoma	"Thunder"	Eliminated
2	Sir Tom Jones	Bethzienna Williams	"River"	Saved by Lifeline vote
3	Sir Tom Jones	Cedric Neal	"Bridge over Troubled Water"	Advanced

== Live shows ==
The live shows began on 30 March 2019.

=== Results summary ===
Team’s colour key
Team Will
Team JHud
Team Tom
Team Olly

Result's colour key
Artist received the most public votes
Artist received the fewest votes and was eliminated

Weekly results per artist
Contestant	Week 1	Week 2	
Contestant	Week 1	Round 1	Round 2
Molly Hocking	1st 26.8%	1st 38.49%	Winner; 55.2%
Deana Walmsley	3rd 15.21%	2nd 29.54%	Runner-up; 44.8%
Jimmy Balito	2nd 17.69%	3rd 19.66%	Eliminated (Week 2)
Bethzienna Williams	4th 12.2%	4th 12.31%	Eliminated (Week 2)
Cedric Neal	5th 8.54%	Eliminated (Week 1)	
Emmanuel Smith	6th 7.36%	Eliminated (Week 1)	
Nicole Dennis	7th 4.63%	Eliminated (Week 1)	
NXTGEN	8th 4.37%	Eliminated (Week 1)	
Moya	9th 3.19%	Eliminated (Week 1)	

==== Week 1: Semi-final (30 March) ====
- Musical guest: Donel Mangena ("Planets")

With the eliminations of Emmanuel Smith, Moya, NXTGEN and Nicole Dennis, will.i.am and Jennifer Hudson no longer have any artists remaining on their teams. This is the first time in all eight seasons that will.i.am does not have an artist represented in the final. This is also the first time in the show's history that only two coaches are represented in the final. With the advancements of Bethzienna Williams and Jimmy Balito, this is the first time that a stolen artist, who is representing the finals, did not originally earn a chair turn by their coach in the blind auditions.

Order	Coach	Artist	Song	Result
1	will.i.am	Emmanuel Smith	"Giant"	Eliminated
2	Jennifer Hudson	Nicole Dennis	"Dream On"	Eliminated
3	Sir Tom Jones	Deana Walmsley	"Autumn Leaves"	Advanced
4	Sir Tom Jones	Bethzienna Williams	"You Don't Own Me"	Advanced
5	Olly Murs	Jimmy Balito	"Fix You"	Advanced
6	Jennifer Hudson	Moya	"I Will Wait"	Eliminated
7	will.i.am	NXTGEN	"Embrace"	Eliminated
8	Sir Tom Jones	Cedric Neal	"High Hopes"	Eliminated
9	Olly Murs	Molly Hocking	"I'll Never Love Again"	Advanced

==== Week 2: Final (6 April) ====
- Musical guest: Ruti ("Racing Cars")

Group performance: The Voice UK coaches – "Gimme Some Lovin'"

Order	Coach	Artist	First song	Order	Duet (with Coach)	Order	Winners single	Result
1	Olly Murs	Jimmy Balito	"The Best"	5	"All Right Now"	N/A	N/A	3rd Place
2	Sir Tom Jones	Bethzienna Williams	"Call Out My Name"	6	"Don't Let Me Be Misunderstood"	N/A	N/A	4th Place
3	Sir Tom Jones	Deana Walmsley	"Hometown Glory"	7	"I Believe"	9	"Autumn Leaves"	Runner-up
4	Olly Murs	Molly Hocking	"Someone You Loved"	8	"Stars"	10	"I'll Never Love Again"	Winner

== Reception ==
=== Ratings ===
Official ratings are 28-day figures, include viewers watching on PC and mobile devices, and are taken from BARB.

Episode	Date	Official ratings	ITV weekly rank
Blind auditions 1	5 January	6.36	13
Blind auditions 2	12 January	5.87	19
Blind auditions 3	19 January	5.88	18
Blind auditions 4	26 January	6.12	16
Blind auditions 5	2 February	5.84	16
Blind auditions 6	9 February	5.53	16
Blind auditions 7	16 February	5.54	16
Battle Rounds 1	23 February	5.12	14
Battle Rounds 2	2 March	4.87	14
Battle Rounds 3	9 March	4.63	17
Knockout Rounds 1	16 March	4.69	17
Knockout Rounds 2	23 March	4.21	16
Live Semi-Final	30 March	4.21	13
Live Final	6 April	5.36	15
