= Vicky Hawkesworth =

British radio presenter

- Born: 9 May 1996 (age 30); Bolton, Greater Manchester, United Kingdom
- Education: University of Salford
- Occupation: Radio presenter
- Employer: BBC

Vicky Hawkesworth (born 9 May 1996) is a British radio presenter and DJ on BBC Radio 1.

== Career ==
Born in Bolton in Greater Manchester, Hawkesworth presented regular shows on BBC Radio Manchester and Gaydio, and has covered a range of shows across BBC Radio 1 since 2020. Alongside Dean McCullough, she replaced Scott Mills and Chris Stark on the afternoon show, which aired Monday to Thursday on BBC Radio 1.In July 2024, she and Nat O'Leary started hosting Radio 1's Group Chat and the 00s, 10s and 20s music shows every Friday to Sunday.

Hawkesworth appeared in an radio special episode of The Weakest Link, which aired on BBC One in early 2024.
