= Finland in the Eurovision Song Contest 1961 =

- Eurovision Song Contest 1961
- Participating broadcaster: Yleisradio (Yle)
- Country: Finland
- Selection process: National Final
- Selection date: 12 February 1961

Competing entry
- Song: "Valoa ikkunassa"
- Artist: Laila Kinnunen
- Songwriters: Eino Hurme; Sauvo Puhtila

Placement
- Final result: 10th, 6 points

Participation chronology

Finland was represented at the Eurovision Song Contest 1961 with the song "Valoa ikkunassa", composed by Eino Hurme, with lyrics by Sauvo Puhtila, and performed by Laila Kinnunen. The Finnish participating broadcaster, Yleisradio (Yle), selected its entry through a national final. This was the first-ever entry from Finland in the Eurovision Song Contest, and the first-ever entry performed in Finnish in the contest.

== Before Eurovision ==
Eight entries were selected for the competition from 280 received submissions. Yleisradio (Yle) selected four singers (Brita Koivunen, Kai Lind, Laila Kinnunen, and Ritva Mustonen) to perform the songs, each with two songs. The Finnish national selection consisted of a semi final and a final.

=== Semi-final ===
The eight songs were played on radio and television test cards in late January, and four finalists were chosen by postcard voting. The public decided the best song from each singer to go forward to the final.

Semi-finals
Artist	R/O	Song	Result
Semi-final 1 – 22 January 1961
Ritva Mustonen	1	"Kun kevät saapuu"	—N/a
Ritva Mustonen	2	"Portinvartija"	Qualified
Semi-final 2 – 23 January 1961
Laila Kinnunen	1	"Jossain meren rannalla"	—N/a
Laila Kinnunen	2	"Valoa ikkunassa"	Qualified
Semi-final 3 – 25 January 1961
Kai Lind	1	"Pistäydyn naapurissa"	—N/a
Kai Lind	2	"Pikku ikkuna"	Qualified
Semi-final 4 – 26 January 1961
Brita Koivunen	1	"Puuttuva lehti"	Qualified
Brita Koivunen	2	"Pikku piccolo"	—N/a

=== Final ===
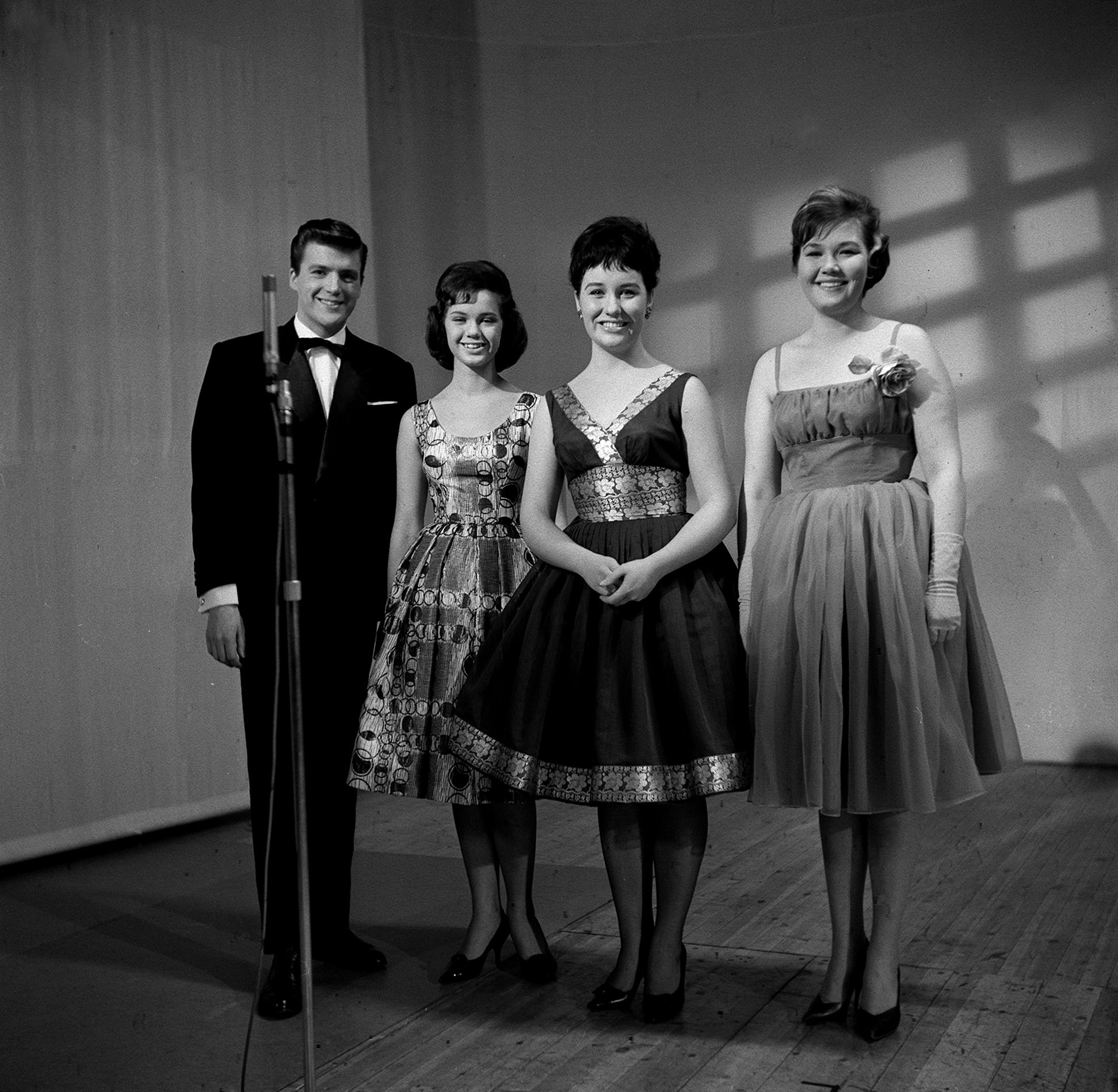
The finalists from left to right: Kai Lind, Christina Hellman, Laila Kinnunen, and Ritva Mustonen

Yleisradio (Yle) held the national final on 12 February 1961 at the Työväenopisto in Helsinki, hosted by Aarno Walli. The winning song was chosen by an expert jury. The members of the jury were Pärre Förars, George de Godzinsky, Cay Idström, Jussi Koskiluoma, Erkki Melakoski, Jorma Panula, Liisa Tuomi, Aarno Walli, and Ville Zilliacus. The jury did not come into a conclusion during the show, so the results were announced next day.

Brita Koivunen was supposed to perform "Puuttuva lehti" in the final but she withdrew and was replaced by Christina Hellman.

Final – 12 February 1961
R/O	Artist	Song	Songwriter(s)	Place
1	Ritva Mustonen	"Portinvartija"	Erik Lindström; Hillevi	3
2	Laila Kinnunen	"Valoa ikkunassa"	Eino Hurme; Sauvo Puhtila	1
3	Kai Lind	"Pikku ikkuna"	Kari Tuomisaari	4
4	Christina Hellman	"Puuttuva lehti"	Erkki Rahkola (Note: Lyricist unknown)	2

== At Eurovision ==
On the evening of the final Laila Kinnunen performed "Valoa ikkunassa" 4th in the running order, following Austria and preceding Yugoslavia. At the close of voting the song had received 6 points (2 from Italy and the United Kingdom and 1 from Denmark and France), placing Finland joint 10th (with Monaco and the Netherlands) of the 16 entries. The Finnish jury awarded its highest marks (3) to Luxembourg and Monaco.

=== Voting ===
Each participating broadcaster assembled a ten-member jury panel. Every jury member could give one point to his or her favourite song.

Points awarded to Finland
Score	Country
2 points	Italy; United Kingdom
1 point	Denmark; France

Points awarded by Finland
Score	Country
3 points	Luxembourg; Monaco
2 points	Norway
1 point	Denmark; France
