= Colette Deréal =

French actress & singer (1927–1988)

Colette Denise de Glarélial
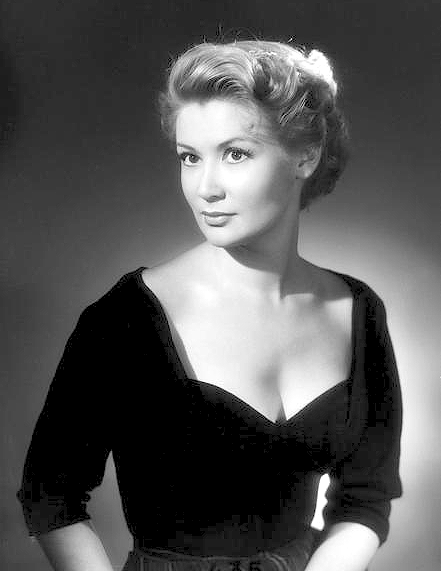

Background information
- Also known as: Colette Deréal
- Born: 22 September 1927; Saint-Cyr-l'École, Seine-et-Oise (now Yvelines, France)
- Died: 12 April 1988 (aged 60) Monaco
- Occupation(s): Singer, actress

Colette Deréal (French pronunciation: [kɔlɛt dəʁeal]; born Colette Denise de Glarélial; 22 September 1927 – 12 April 1988) was a French actress and singer. She is best known for representing Monaco in the Eurovision Song Contest 1961.

== Eurovision Song Contest 1961 ==
Deréal was born in Saint-Cyr-l'École, Seine-et-Oise (now Yvelines), France. In 1961, Deréal represented Monaco in the Eurovision Song Contest 1961, with the song "Allons, allons les enfants" (Let's go, let's go children). Deréal finished joint tenth place with the Finnish entry "Valoa ikkunassa" (The lights in the window) sung by Laila Kinnunen and the Dutch entry "Wat een dag" (What a day) sung by Greetje Kauffeld, receiving six points. She died in Monaco.

== Selected filmography ==
- The Sinners (1949)
- Boîte à vendre (1951)
- Music in the Head (1951)
- The Convict (1951)
- This Age Without Pity (1952)
- Sergil Amongst the Girls (1952)
- Little Boy Lost (1953)
- This Man Is Dangerous (1953)
- Yours Truly, Blake (1954)
- The Red Cloak (1955)
- Three Sailors (1957)
- Under the Sign of the Bull (1969)

Preceded by François Deguelt with Ce soir-là	Monaco in the Eurovision Song Contest; 1961	Succeeded by François Deguelt with Dis rien
