= Switzerland in the Eurovision Song Contest 1961 =

- Eurovision Song Contest 1961
- Participating broadcaster: Swiss Broadcasting Corporation (SRG SSR)
- Country: Switzerland
- Selection process: Gran Premio Eurovisione della canzone
- Selection date: 6 February 1961

Competing entry
- Song: "Nous aurons demain"
- Artist: Franca di Rienzo
- Songwriters: Géo Voumard; Émile Gardaz

Placement
- Final result: 3rd, 16 points

Participation chronology

Switzerland was represented at the Eurovision Song Contest 1961 with the song "Nous aurons demain", composed by Géo Voumard, with lyrics by Émile Gardaz, and performed by Franca di Rienzo. The Swiss participating broadcaster, the Swiss Broadcasting Corporation (SRG SSR), selected its entry through a national final.

== Before Eurovision ==
=== Gran Premio Eurovisione della canzone ===
The Swiss Broadcasting Corporation (SRG SSR) held a national final to select its entry for the Eurovision Song Contest 1961. Applying artists and songwriters were required to have Swiss citizenship or have resided in Switzerland for at least five years. The broadcaster received 157 submitted songs, nine of which were chosen by juries to participate in the selection. Four of these songs were in Italian, three were in French, and two were in German. Five artists competed to represent Switzerland, among whom was Anita Traversi— who previously represented Switzerland in 1960, and would repeat this in 1964. Gino Latilla was supposed to participate, but was replaced by Carla Boni shortly before the final.

Competing entries
| Broadcaster | Artist | Song | Songwriter(s) | | Language |
| Broadcaster | Artist | Song | Composer | Lyricist | Language |
|---|---|---|---|---|---|
| TSI | Carla Boni | "Voglio baciarti ancora" | Giovanni Pelli | | Italian |
| TSI | Carla Boni | "Addio parole d'amore" | Mario Robbiani | Louis Rey | Italian |
| TSI | Anita Traversi | "Finalmente" | Giovanni Pelli | Velio Bargellini | Italian |
| TSI | Anita Traversi | "L'ingresso nei sogni" | Mario Robbiani | | Italian |
| TSR | Jo Roland | "Nous deux" | Géo Voumard | Émile Gardaz | French |
| TSR | Franca di Rienzo | "Fermé pour la vie" | Géo Voumard | Émile Gardaz | French |
| TSR | Franca di Rienzo | "Nous aurons demain" | Géo Voumard | Émile Gardaz | French |
| DRS | Jo Roland | "Stop" | Georg Benz-Stahl | | German |
| DRS | Ines Taddio | "Eine kleine Melodie" | Renato Bui | Fritz Körner | German |

Swiss Italian broadcaster Televisione svizzera di lingua italiana (TSI) staged the national final on 6 February 1961 at 21:00 CET (20:00 UTC) in the Conza Pavillion in Lugano. It was presented by Heidi Abel and Dario Bertoni. Fernando Paggi served as the musical director and accompanied the orchestra. The songs were performed twice; once by the participating artists and again with a sextet led by Iller Pattacini, that was prerecorded and showed to the live audience with monitors provided by the event organizers.

The winning song was chosen by a ten-member "expert" jury, whose members each gave one vote to their desired song. The three Ticinese (Swiss-Italian) jurors were Piero Bianconi, Cherubino Darani, and Gastone Luvini. The winner was the song "Nous aurons demain", written by Émile Gardaz, composed by Géo Voumard, and performed by Franca di Rienzo. From 25-27 August, Jo Roland participated in the Sopot International Song Festival with the song, "Nous deux," and won the inaugural edition of that contest.

Final – 6 February 1961
| R/O | Artist | Song | Total | Place |
|---|---|---|---|---|
| 1 | Carla Boni | "Voglio baciarti ancora" | 0 | 3 |
| 2 | Jo Roland | "Nous deux" | 3 | 2 |
| 3 | Jo Roland | "Stop" | 0 | 3 |
| 4 | Anita Traversi | "Finalmente" | 0 | 3 |
| 5 | Franca di Rienzo | "Fermé pour la vie" | 0 | 3 |
| 6 | Anita Traversi | "L'ingresso nei sogni" | 0 | 3 |
| 7 | Ines Taddio | "Eine kleine Melodie" | 0 | 3 |
| 8 | Carla Boni | "Addio parole d'amore" | 0 | 3 |
| 9 | Franca di Rienzo | "Nous aurons demain" | 7 | 1 |

==== Protests from rejected songwriters ====
Only a day after the selection, it was first reported that a protest, reportedly organized by a songwriter from Grigna, was held by several rejected songwriters outside the Conza Pavillion at night, citing unfairness regarding the lineup selection. This was additionally criticized by the press due to the lack of variety in the selected songwriters. Protesters placed signs with various slogans near the Conza entrance. The protest itself was reportedly peaceful and did not escalate.

=== Releases and archives ===
Franca di Rienzo recorded and released "Nous aurons demain" in two singles and an EP in 1961. In 1998, the song was featured in a CD compilation titled "Concours Eurovision De La Chanson 1956-1998: Schweizer Beiträge", which compiled every Swiss Eurovision entry at the time. No other songs from the selection were released by their performers or covered commercially.

A live audio recording of "Nous deux" by Jo Roland in the Sopot Song Festival 1961 has been recorded, presumably from Polskie Radio archives. Recordings of both of Anita Traversi's entries have been preserved in the Swiss National Sound Archives, as well as cover recordings of Carla Boni's songs, with Anita Traversi singing "Voglio baciarti ancora" and Dino Sarti singing "Addio parole d'amore".

== At Eurovision ==
At the Eurovision Song Contest 1961 in Cannes, the Swiss entry was the tenth song of the night following France and preceding Belgium. The Swiss entry was conducted by Fernando Paggi, who previously conducted multiple songs in the 1956 contest, where he served as the musical director. At the close of voting, Switzerland had received sixteen points in total; the country finished third among the sixteen participants.

The contest was broadcast on SRG SSR via TV DRS and Radio Bern in German-speaking Switzerland, TSR (with commentary from Robert Beauvais in French) and Radio Sottens in Romandy, and TSI and Radio Monte Ceneri in Ticino.

=== Voting ===
Each participating broadcaster assembled a ten-member jury panel. Every jury member could give one point to their favourite song.

Points awarded to Switzerland
| Score | Country |
|---|---|
| 4 points | Sweden |
| 2 points | Austria; Italy; Monaco; Netherlands; United Kingdom |
| 1 point | Spain; Yugoslavia |

Points awarded by Switzerland
| Score | Country |
|---|---|
| 7 points | United Kingdom |
| 1 point | Luxembourg; Monaco; Yugoslavia |
