= France in the Eurovision Song Contest 1961 =

- Eurovision Song Contest 1961
- Participating broadcaster: Radiodiffusion-Télévision Française (RTF)
- Country: France
- Selection process: National final
- Selection date: 18 February 1961

Competing entry
- Song: "Printemps, avril carillonne"
- Artist: Jean-Paul Mauric
- Songwriters: Francis Baxter; Guy Favereau

Placement
- Final result: 4th, 13 points

Participation chronology

France was represented at the Eurovision Song Contest 1961 with the song "Printemps, avril carillonne", composed by Francis Baxter, with lyrics by Guy Favereau, and performed by Jean-Paul Mauric. The French participating broadcaster, Radiodiffusion-Télévision Française (RTF), selected its entry through a national final. In addition, RTF was also the host broadcaster and staged the event at the Palais des Festivals et des Congrès in Cannes, after winning the previous edition with the song "Tom Pillibi" by Jacqueline Boyer.

== Before Eurovision ==
=== National final ===
For 1961, Radiodiffusion-Télévision Française (RTF) opted to hold a national final, which took place on 18 February at 21:20 CET (20:20 UTC). The final was hosted by Jacqueline Joubert and directed by Marcel Cravenne. Six songs (Note: A seventh song called "Pic' Nic'" was named by French TV magazine Télérama to take part in the national final but didn't appear to compete in the live broadcast.) took part. The artists were accompanied by the orchestra of Camille Sauvage. The winner was chosen by votes from members of the public who were telephoned by RTF's regional studios. Each of the 11 regional juries consisted of 50 viewers, with the exception of Paris where 100 viewers were telephoned.

Final - 18 February 1961
R/O	Artist	Song	Points	Place
1	Christiane Lasquin	"Toi pour moi, moi pour toi"	57	5
2	Isabelle Aubret	"Le gars de n'importe où"	100	3
3	Arabelle	"Un petit brin de musette"	31	6
4	Sophie Darel	"Printemps de Paris"	90	4
5	Jean-Paul Mauric	"Printemps (avril carillonne)"	212	1
6	Bernard Stephane	"Les mouettes"	109	2

Jury Votes
Song	Bordeaux	Lille	Limoges	Lyon	Marseille	Nancy	Rennes	Strasbourg	Toulouse	Algiers	Paris	Total
"Toi pour moi, moi pour toi"	4	3	2	6	5	5	4	4	5	7	12	57
"Le gars de n'importe où"	5	7	11	10	8	12	10	9	4	5	19	100
"Un petit brin de musette"	1	3	4	1	2	3	1	2	2	10	2	31
"Printemps de Paris"	4	6	8	13	5	3	6	11	13	5	16	90
"Printemps, avril carillonne"	25	21	12	17	23	17	19	16	17	15	30	212
"Les mouettes"	10	10	13	3	7	10	10	8	9	8	21	109

== At Eurovision ==
On the night of the final Mauric performed 9th in the running order, following Germany and preceding Switzerland. At the close of the voting "Printemps, avril carillonne" had received 13 points, placing France 4th of the 16 competing entries.

=== Voting ===
Every country had a jury of ten people. Every jury member could give one point to his or her favourite song.

Points awarded to France
Score	Country
4 points	Germany
2 points	Monaco; Spain; United Kingdom
1 point	Finland; Luxembourg; Sweden

Points awarded by France
Score	Country
2 points	Spain; Sweden; Yugoslavia
1 point	Finland; Italy; Luxembourg; Netherlands
