= Eurovision Song Contest 1961 =

International song competition

Coordinates: 43°33′12″N 7°01′20″E

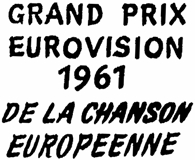

Date and venue
- Final: 18 March 1961
- Venue: Palais des Festivals; Cannes, France

Organisation
- Organiser: European Broadcasting Union (EBU)

Production
- Host broadcaster: Radiodiffusion-Télévision Française (RTF)
- Producer: Marcel Cravenne
- Director: Maurice Barry
- Musical director: Franck Pourcel
- Presenter: Jacqueline Joubert

Participants
- Number of entries: 16
- Debuting countries: Finland; Spain; Yugoslavia
- Participation map: Participating countries

Vote
- Voting system: Ten-member juries in each country; each member gave one vote to their favourite song
- Winning song: Luxembourg "Nous les amoureux"

The Eurovision Song Contest 1961, originally known as the Grand Prix Eurovision 1961 de la Chanson Européenne (English: Eurovision Song Contest Grand Prix 1961), was the 6th edition of the Eurovision Song Contest, held on 18 March 1961 at the Palais des Festivals et des Congrès in Cannes, France, and presented by Jacqueline Joubert. It was organised by the European Broadcasting Union (EBU) and host broadcaster Radiodiffusion-Télévision Française (RTF), who staged the event after winning the 1960 contest for France with the song "Tom Pillibi" by Jacqueline Boyer. It was the second time that France had hosted the contest, becoming the first country to host the contest on two occasions, following the 1959 event which was also held in the Palais des Festivals in Cannes and was also presented by Jacqueline Joubert.

Broadcasters from sixteen countries entered the contest - a new record - with the thirteen countries which competed in 1960 present alongside Finland, Spain, and Yugoslavia; all three making their first contest appearances.

The winner was Luxembourg with the song "Nous les amoureux", composed by Jacques Datin, written by Maurice Vidalin and performed by Jean-Claude Pascal, the first of an eventual five contest victories for the country as of 2026. Although not interpreted as such at the time, the winning song has since been reevaluated and reinterpreted as a song about homosexual love, a topic which would have been considered taboo if publicly spoken in 1961. The United Kingdom placed second for the third consecutive contest, while Switzerland came third.

== Location ==
Palais des Festivals et des Congres, Cannes – host venue of the 1961 contest

The 1961 contest took place in Cannes, France, following the nation's victory at the 1960 edition in London, the United Kingdom, with the song "Tom Pillibi", performed by Jacqueline Boyer. The selected venue was the Palais des Festivals et des Congrès, built in 1949 to host the Cannes Film Festival and located on the Promenade de la Croisette along the shore of the Mediterranean Sea. Due to the growth in the film festival a new building bearing the same name was opened in 1982, with the original building renamed as the Palais Croisette.

This was the second time that the contest was staged in France, with the same venue having already hosted the 1959 contest. It also marked the first time that a country and city had staged the contest on two occasions.

Other events held during the week of the contest included a supper for the participating delegations, which was held after the contest in the Salon des Ambassadeurs in the city's Casino municipal.

== Participants ==
Eurovision Song Contest 1961 – Participation summaries by country
- Austria; Belgium; Denmark; Finland; France; Germany; Italy; Luxembourg; Monaco; Netherlands; Norway; Spain; Sweden; Switzerland; United Kingdom; Yugoslavia

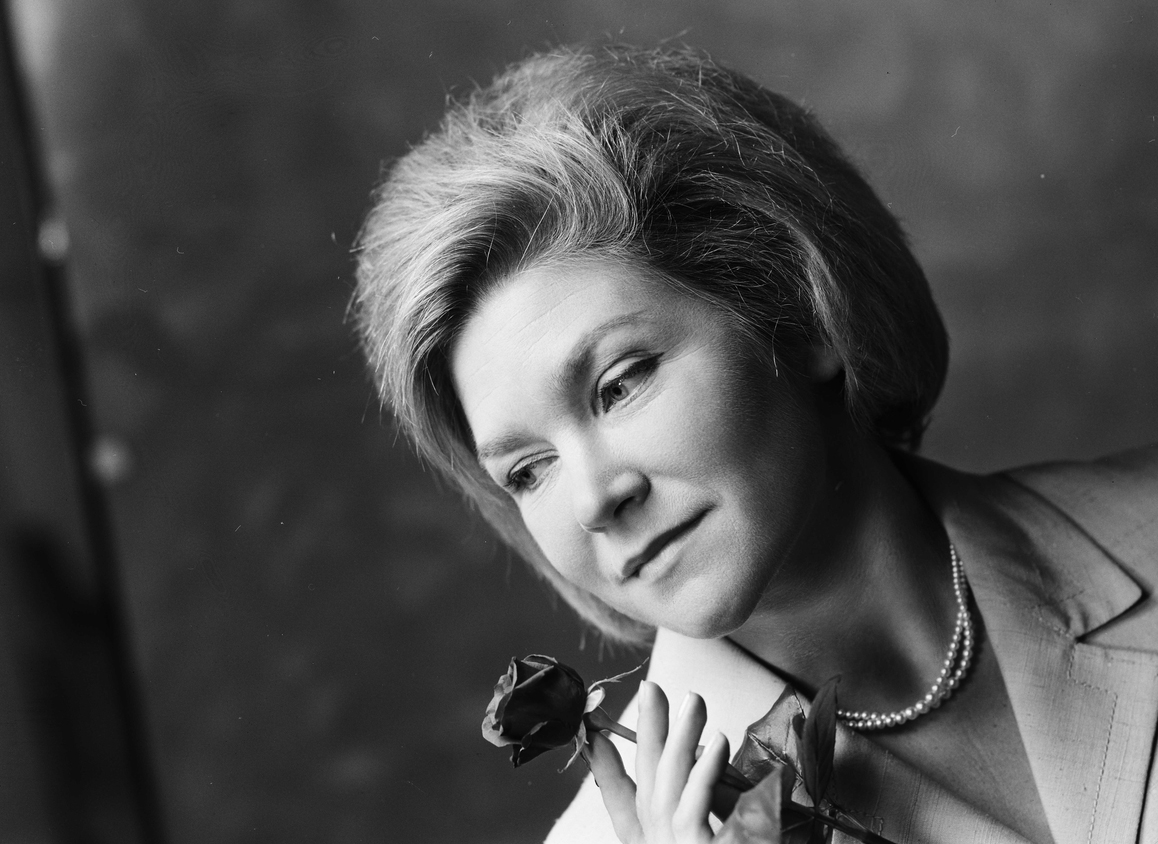
Nora Brockstedt represented Norway in the contest for a second consecutive year.

The 1961 contest saw the first entries from Finland, Spain and Yugoslavia. Joining the thirteen countries which had competed in the previous year's event, this led to the contest growing to a record number of sixteen participants.

Bob Benny and Nora Brockstedt both made a second appearance in the contest for their respective countries. Benny had placed sixth for Belgium in 1959 with the song "Hou toch van mij", while Brockstedt had placed fourth for Norway in 1960 with "Voi-voi". Also among the participating artists was Germany's Lale Andersen, who had gained significant international fame and popularity during World War II, both in Allied and Axis countries, for her interpretation of "Lili Marleen". At 56 years old, Andersen was the oldest performer to have competed in the contest, and held this record until 2008, when 75-year-old Ladislav Demeterffy (also known as 75 Cents) competed for Croatia with the group Kraljevi ulice.

Eurovision Song Contest 1961 participants
Country	Broadcaster	Artist	Song	Language	Songwriter(s)	Conductor
Austria	ORF	Jimmy Makulis	"Sehnsucht"	German	Leopold Andrejewitsch	Franck Pourcel
Belgium	BRT	Bob Benny	"September, gouden roos"	Dutch	Wim Brabants; Hans Flower	Francis Bay
Denmark	DR	Dario Campeotto	"Angelique"	Danish	Aksel V. Rasmussen	Kai Mortensen
Finland	YLE	Laila Kinnunen	"Valoa ikkunassa"	Finnish	Eino Hurme; Sauvo Puhtila	George de Godzinsky
France	RTF	Jean-Paul Mauric	"Printemps (avril carillonne)"	French	Francis Baxter; Guy Favereau	Franck Pourcel
Germany	HR (Note: On behalf of the German public broadcasting consortium ARD)	Lale Andersen	"Einmal sehen wir uns wieder"	German, French	Ernst Bader; Rudolf Maluck	Franck Pourcel
Italy	RAI	Betty Curtis	"Al di là"	Italian	Carlo Donida; Giulio Rapetti	Gianfranco Intra
Luxembourg	CLT	Jean-Claude Pascal	"Nous les amoureux"	French	Jacques Datin; Maurice Vidalin	Léo Chauliac
Monaco	TMC	Colette Deréal	"Allons, allons les enfants"	French	Pierre Delanoë; Hubert Giraud	Raymond Lefèvre
Netherlands	NTS	Greetje Kauffeld	"Wat een dag"	Dutch	Pieter Goemans; Dick Schallies	Dolf van der Linden
Norway	NRK	Nora Brockstedt	"Sommer i Palma"	Norwegian	Egil Hagen; Jan Wølner	Øivind Bergh
Spain	TVE	Conchita Bautista	"Estando contigo"	Spanish	Augusto Algueró; Antonio Guijarro Campoy	Rafael Ferrer
Sweden	SR	Lill-Babs	"April, april"	Swedish	Bo Eneby; Bobbie Ericson	William Lind
Switzerland	SRG SSR	Franca di Rienzo	"Nous aurons demain"	French	Émile Gardaz; Géo Voumard	Fernando Paggi
United Kingdom	BBC	The Allisons	"Are You Sure?"	English	John Alford; Bob Day	Harry Robinson
Yugoslavia	JRT	Ljiljana Petrović	"Neke davne zvezde" (Неке давне звезде)	Serbo-Croatian	Miroslav Antić; Jože Privšek	Jože Privšek

== Production and format ==
The contest was organised and broadcast by the French public broadcaster Radiodiffusion-Télévision Française (RTF). Marcel Cravenne served as producer and director, Maurice Barry served as cinematographer, Gérard Dubois served as designer, and Franck Pourcel served as musical director, leading forty musicians of the Orchestre national de la RTF. Each participating delegation was allowed to nominate its own musical director to lead the orchestra during the performance of its country's entry, with the host musical director also conducting for those countries which did not nominate their own conductor. The event was presented by Jacqueline Joubert, who had also hosted the 1959 contest; Joubert remains as of 2025 one of only three individuals to have presented multiple Eurovision Song Contests, alongside the UK's Katie Boyle (1960, 1963, 1968 and 1974) and Sweden's Petra Mede (2013, 2016 and 2024).

Each country, participating through a single EBU member broadcaster, was represented by one song performed by up to two people on stage. The results of the event were determined through jury voting, with each country's jury containing ten individuals who each gave one vote to their favourite song, with no abstentions allowed and with jurors unable to vote for their own country. The jury comprised members of the public who represented the average television viewer. Many of the other aspects of the show were however almost identical to the previous contest in Cannes, including the opening film, direction, production and the scoreboard used during the voting process.

The stage design was notably larger than in previous years, featuring a central large staircase covered in flowers, trees and shrubs, with a painted outdoor scene in the background, giving an impression of a Mediterranean garden. Dubois chose the trees to be featured within the stage design with André Racot, the head of the Cannes municipal gardens, making sure that the trees were not too dark when shown on black-and-white television. The original design featured the green room within the stage, with the artists remaining on stage after they had performed, however this idea ultimately did not feature in the final design constructed for the event.

The draw to determine the running order took place on 16 March 1961 at the Carlton Hotel in Cannes, conducted by Jacqueline Joubert and assisted by two children aged six and four. The draw also featured interviews with some of the participating acts conducted by Robert Beauvais. Rehearsals commenced in the contest venue on the same day.

== Contest overview ==
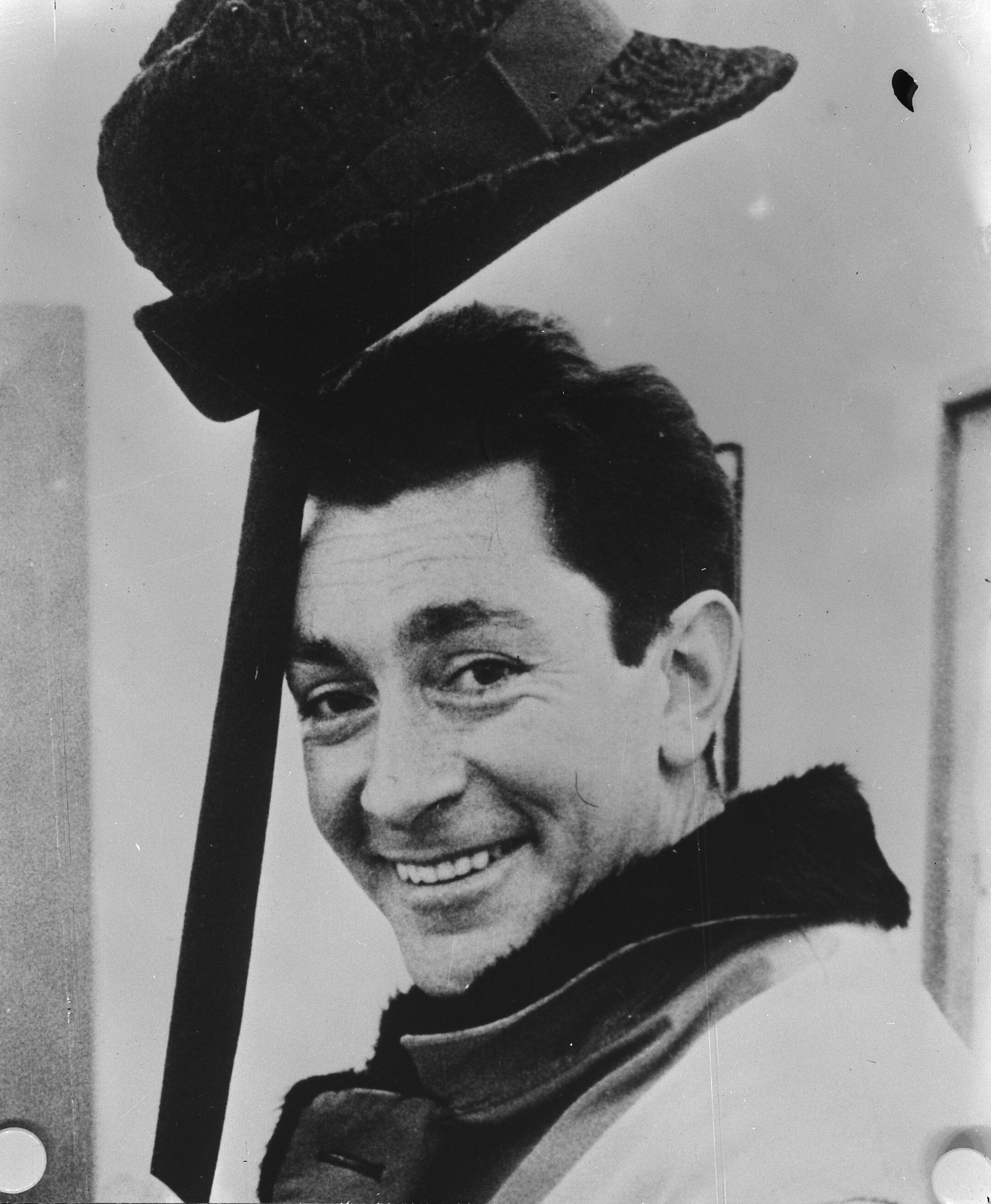
Jean-Claude Pascal, the winning artist of the 1961 contest

The contest was held on 18 March 1961 at 20:00 (CET) and lasted 1 hour and 39 minutes. It was the first time that the contest was staged on a Saturday night, which has since become the traditional day on which the grand final of the contest is staged. The interval act was a dance performance by Tessa Beaumont and Max Bozzoni titled Rencontres à Cannes, with music by Raymond Lefèvre. The prize for the winning artist and songwriters, an engraved medallion, was presented by Tessa Beaumont.

The winner was Luxembourg represented by the song "Nous les amoureux", composed by Jacques Datin, written by Maurice Vidalin and performed by the French singer and actor Jean-Claude Pascal. This was the first of an eventual five contest victories that Luxembourg has gone on to achieve as of 2026. The United Kingdom's entry came second for the third consecutive contest, while the Swiss entry placed third.

Although not widely interpreted as such at the time of the contest, it has since become known that the winning song speaks clandestinely of a homosexual relationship: the lyrics refer to a love that is frowned upon by society and forbidden by religion, however the singer hopes that one day their relationship will continue without controversy. Songs of such subject matter would have been considered taboo, and would not have been allowed to be spoken of widely in 1961; same-sex sexual activities were illegal in almost half of the countries competing in the contest at the time, including in Austria, West Germany, the UK and Spain. Therefore, the true meaning of the lyrics was required to be hidden behind subtext and double meanings, an interpretation later affirmed by Pascal, himself a gay man, although he never publicly came out during his lifetime. Given the song was released before the emergence of the modern gay liberation movement, it has since been interpreted as an early protest song in favour of rights for sexual minorities. The song has since been used more visibly to highlight LGBTQ rights, including in a promotional video by the French government to highlight homophobia, biphobia and transphobia.

Results of the Eurovision Song Contest 1961
R/O	Country	Artist	Song	Votes	Place
1	Spain	Conchita Bautista	"Estando contigo"	8	9
2	Monaco	Colette Deréal	"Allons, allons les enfants"	6	10
3	Austria	Jimmy Makulis	"Sehnsucht"	1	15
4	Finland	Laila Kinnunen	"Valoa ikkunassa"	6	10
5	Yugoslavia	Ljiljana Petrović	"Neke davne zvezde"	9	8
6	Netherlands	Greetje Kauffeld	"Wat een dag"	6	10
7	Sweden	Lill-Babs	"April, april"	2	14
8	Germany	Lale Andersen	"Einmal sehen wir uns wieder"	3	13
9	France	Jean-Paul Mauric	"Printemps (avril carillonne)"	13	4
10	Switzerland	Franca di Rienzo	"Nous aurons demain"	16	3
11	Belgium	Bob Benny	"September, gouden roos"	1	15
12	Norway	Nora Brockstedt	"Sommer i Palma"	10	7
13	Denmark	Dario Campeotto	"Angelique"	12	5
14	Luxembourg	Jean-Claude Pascal	"Nous les amoureux"	31	1
15	United Kingdom	The Allisons	"Are You Sure?"	24	2
16	Italy	Betty Curtis	"Al di là"	12	5

=== Spokespersons ===
Each participating broadcaster appointed a spokesperson, connected to the contest venue via telephone lines and responsible for announcing, in English or French, the votes for its respective country. Known spokespersons at the 1961 contest are listed below.

- Finland – Poppe Berg
- Netherlands – Siebe van der Zee
- Sweden – Roland Eiworth
- United Kingdom – Michael Aspel

== Detailed voting results ==
Jury voting was used to determine the scores awarded by all countries; each country assembled a ten-person jury, with each juror awarding one vote to their favourite song. The announcement of the results from each country was conducted in reverse order to that which each country performed, with the spokespersons announcing their country's votes in English or French in performance order. The detailed breakdown of the votes awarded by each country is listed in the tables below, with voting countries listed in the order in which they presented their votes.

Detailed voting results of the Eurovision Song Contest 1961
		Total score	Italy	United Kingdom	Luxembourg	Denmark	Norway	Belgium	Switzerland	France	Germany	Sweden	Netherlands	Yugoslavia	Finland	Austria	Monaco	Spain
Contestants	Spain	8		1			2			2		1	1				1	
Contestants	Monaco	6		1					1						3			1
Contestants	Austria	1		1														
Contestants	Finland	6	2	2		1				1								
Contestants	Yugoslavia	9		1		1			1	2			1			3		
Contestants	Netherlands	6	2							1	1			2				
Contestants	Sweden	2								2								
Contestants	Germany	3				1						1				1		
Contestants	France	13		2	1						4	1			1		2	2
Contestants	Switzerland	16	2	2								4	2	1		2	2	1
Contestants	Belgium	1			1													
Contestants	Norway	10				1		5						1	2			1
Contestants	Denmark	12					8					2	1		1			
Contestants	Luxembourg	31	3			1			1	1	5	1	1	5	3	4	4	2
Contestants	United Kingdom	24	1		8	1		1	7				3					3
Contestants	Italy	12				4		4		1			1	1			1	

== Broadcasts ==
Broadcasters competing in the event were required to relay the contest via its networks; non-participating EBU member broadcasters were also able to relay the contest. Broadcasters were able to send commentators to provide coverage of the contest in their own native language and to relay information about the artists and songs to their television viewers. These commentators were typically sent to the venue to report on the event, and were able to provide commentary from small booths constructed at the back of the venue. Local press reported a total of 14 commentators reporting on the contest, with a total of 16 countries broadcasting the event.

No official accounts of total international viewing figures are known to exist; an estimate given in the French press ahead of the contest suggested there would be 40 million viewers across Europe. Known details on the broadcasts in each country, including the specific broadcasting stations and commentators are shown in the tables below.

Broadcasters and commentators
Country	Broadcaster	Channel(s)	Commentator(s)	Ref.
Austria	ORF	ORF		
Belgium	BRT	BRT	Nic Bal	
Belgium	RTB	RTB	Robert Beauvais	
Denmark	DR	Danmarks Radio TV, Program 1	Sejr Volmer-Sørensen	
Finland	YLE	Suomen Televisio, Yleisohjelma	Aarno Walli	
France	RTF	RTF, France I	Robert Beauvais	
Germany	ARD	Deutsches Fernsehen	Wolf Mittler	
Italy	RAI	RAI Televisione, Secondo Programma	Corrado Mantoni	
Luxembourg	CLT	Télé-Luxembourg	Robert Beauvais	
Monaco	Télé Monte-Carlo, Radio Monte Carlo		Robert Beauvais	
Netherlands	NTS	NTS	Piet te Nuyl Jr.	
Netherlands	VARA	Hilversum 1	Coen Serré	
Norway	NRK	NRK Fjernsynet, NRK	Leif Rustad	
Spain	TVE	TVE	Federico Gallo	
Spain	RNE	RNE		
Sweden	SR	Sveriges TV, SR P1	Jan Gabrielsson	
Switzerland	SRG SSR	TV DRS, Radio Bern		
Switzerland	SRG SSR	TSR	Robert Beauvais	
Switzerland	SRG SSR	TSI, Radio Monte Ceneri		
Switzerland	SRG SSR	Radio Sottens		
United Kingdom	BBC	BBC TV	Tom Sloan	
Yugoslavia	JRT	Televizija Beograd, Radio Beograd 1, Televizija Ljubljana, Televizija Zagreb	Saša Novak	
Yugoslavia	JRT	Radio Ljubljana 2		

== Notes and references ==
=== Bibliography ===
- Cannes, elles & eux : des hommes, des femmes, leur destin à Cannes [Cannes, them & them : men, women, their destiny in Cannes] (in French). Vol. 2. Cannes, France: Archives communales de Cannes. 2007. ISBN 978-2-9162-6101-0. OCLC 213499510.
- Anselmi, Eddy (2020). Il festival di Sanremo: 70 anni di storie, canzoni, cantanti e serate [The Sanremo festival: 70 years of stories, songs, singers and evenings] (in Italian). Milan, Italy: Planeta DeAgostini. ISBN 978-88-511-7854-3.
- Murtomäki, Asko (2007). Finland 12 points! Suomen Euroviisut (in Finnish). Helsinki, Finland: Teos. ISBN 978-951-851-106-2.
- O'Connor, John Kennedy (2015). The Eurovision Song Contest: The Official Celebration. London, United Kingdom: Carlton Books. ISBN 978-1-78097-638-9.
- O'Connor, John Kennedy (2010). The Eurovision Song Contest: The Official History (2nd ed.). London, United Kingdom: Carlton Books. ISBN 978-1-84732-521-1.
- Pajala, Mari (2013). "Intervision Song Contests and Finnish Television between East and West". In Badenoch, Alexander; Fickers, Andreas; Henrich-Franke, Christian (eds.). Airy Curtains in the European Ether: Broadcasting and the Cold War. Baden-Baden, Germany: Nomos. pp. 215–270. doi:10.5771/9783845236070-215. ISBN 9783845236070.
- Roxburgh, Gordon (2012). Songs for Europe: The United Kingdom at the Eurovision Song Contest. Vol. One: The 1950s and 1960s. Prestatyn, United Kingdom: Telos Publishing. ISBN 978-1-84583-065-6.
- Thorsson, Leif; Verhage, Martin (2006). Melodifestivalen genom tiderna : de svenska uttagningarna och internationella finalerna [Melodifestivalen through the ages: the Swedish selections and international finals] (in Swedish). Stockholm, Sweden: Premium Publishing. ISBN 91-89136-29-2.
- West, Chris (April 2020). Eurovision! A History of Modern Europe Through the World's Greatest Song Contest (Updated ed.). London, United Kingdom: Melville House UK. ISBN 978-1-911545-55-2.
