= Sweden in the Eurovision Song Contest 1961 =

- Eurovision Song Contest 1961
- Participating broadcaster: Sveriges Radio (SR)
- Country: Sweden
- Selection process: Song: National final Artist: Internal selection
- Selection date: 6 February 1961

Competing entry
- Song: "April, april"
- Artist: Lill-Babs
- Songwriters: Bobbie Ericsson; Bo Eneby

Placement
- Final result: 14th, 2 points

Participation chronology

Sweden was represented at the Eurovision Song Contest 1961 with the song "April, april", composed by Bobbie Ericsson, with lyrics by Bo Eneby, and performed by Lill-Babs. The Swedish participating broadcaster, Sveriges Radio (SR), selected its entry through a national final. The song was performed once by Siw Malmkvist, once by Gunnar Wiklund in the national final. However, none of them was considered acceptable for singing in Eurovision, so SR chose Lill-Babs as its representative instead. In the contest, once more held in Cannes, she finished in 14th place (out of 16).

== Before Eurovision ==
=== Eurovisionsschlagern - svensk final ===
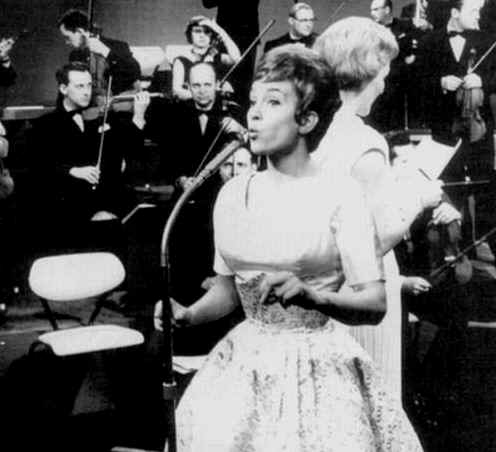
Siw Malmkvist singing "April, april" at the national final.

Eurovisionsschlagern - svensk final (retroactively often referred to as Melodifestivalen 1961) was the Swedish national final and it was the third time that Sveriges Radio (SR) used a national final to select their song. One singer performed the song with a large orchestra and one with a smaller orchestra. Approximately 550 songs were submitted to SR for the competition. The final was held in the Cirkus in Stockholm on 6 February 1961, broadcast on Sveriges Radio TV, but was not broadcast on radio. Siw Malmkvist won with "April, april" but Lill-Babs went to Eurovision.

Melodifestivalen - 6 February 1961
First Performance		Second Performance		Song	Songwriter(s)	Points	Place
R/O	Artist	R/O	Artist	Song	Songwriter(s)	Points	Place
1	Lars Lönndahl	6	Lily Berglund	"Spela på regnbågen"	Britt Lindeborg	71	2
2	Siw Malmkvist	7	Gunnar Wiklund	"Vår i hjärtat"	Lennart Gröhn	58	4
3	Lily Berglund	8	Lill-Babs	"Stockholm"	Bobbie Ericson, Eric Sandström	57	5
4	Gunnar Wiklund	9	Siw Malmkvist	"April, april"	Bobbie Ericson, Bo Eneby	78	1
5	Lill-Babs	10	Lars Lönndahl	"Vårvinter"	Bobbie Ericson	71	2

== At Eurovision ==
On the night of the final, Lill-Babs performed 7th in the running order, following the Netherlands and preceding Germany.

At the close of the voting "April, april" had received only 2 points (from France), placing Sweden 14th of the 16 competing entries.

=== Voting ===
Every participating broadcaster assembled a jury panel of ten people. Every jury member could give one point to his or her favourite song.

Points awarded to Sweden
Score	Country
2 points	France

Points awarded by Sweden
Score	Country
4 points	Switzerland
2 points	Denmark
1 point	France; Germany; Luxembourg; Spain
