= Belgium in the Eurovision Song Contest 1961 =

- Eurovision Song Contest 1961
- Participating broadcaster: Belgische Radio- en Televisieomroep (BRT)
- Country: Belgium
- Selection process: Finale van de Belgische Bijdrage tot het Eurovisiesongfestival
- Selection date: 29 February 1961

Competing entry
- Song: "September, gouden roos"
- Artist: Bob Benny
- Songwriters: Hans Flower; Wim Brabants

Placement
- Final result: 15th, 1 point

Participation chronology

Belgium was represented at the Eurovision Song Contest 1961 with the song "September, gouden roos", composed by Hans Flower, with lyrics by Wim Brabants, and performed by Bob Benny. The Belgian participating broadcaster, Dutch-speaking Belgische Radio- en Televisieomroep (BRT), selected its entry through a national final. Benny had previously represented Belgium in 1959.

Future Belgian entrant Jacques Raymond (1963 and 1971) finished runner-up in the national final.

== Before Eurovision ==
=== Finale van de Belgische Bijdrage tot het Eurovisiesongfestival ===
Finale van de Belgische Bijdrage tot het Eurovisiesongfestival was the national final format developed by Dutch-speaking broadcaster Belgische Radio- en Televisieomroep (BRT) in order to select the Belgian entry for the Eurovision Song Contest 1961.

==== Competing entries ====
BRT opened a submission period for artists and composers to submit their songs. At the close of the deadline, 381 entries were submitted, from which the broadcaster selected 6 for the contest and assigned artists to them. Louis Neefs was assigned to "Bonjour" but was not allowed by his music publisher to sing the song, and Rina Pia was assigned to "Maandenkrans der liefde" but she didn't like the song and claimed it was "unsingable". Ultimately, they were replaced with Luc Van Hoeselt and Enny Denita.

==== Final ====
The national final was held on 29 January 1961 at 21:00 CET at the Amerikaans Theater in Brussels and hosted by Aimée De Smet. Six songs took part with the winner being chosen by an "expert" jury. It is not known by what system the songs were scored.

Final - 29 January 1961
R/O	Artist	Song	Songwriter(s)		Points	Place
R/O	Artist	Song	Composer(s)	Lyricist(s)	Points	Place
1	Tony Sandler	"Moeder"	Henk van Montfoort		8	6
2	Jacques Raymond	"Als je weent, als je lacht"	A. Van Steyvoort	L. Van Steyvoort	40	2
3	Jo Leemans	"Af en toe"	Gerd Frank; Benny Welton; Louis Baret		33	3
4	Bob Benny	"September, gouden roos"	Hans Flower	Clem De Ridder	60	1
5	Luc van Hoeselt	"Bonjour"	Roger Snoeck	Ke Riema	21	4
6	Enny Denita	"Maandenkrans der liefde"	Jef Van den Berg		14	5

== At Eurovision ==
On the night of the final Bob Benny performed 11th in the running order, following Switzerland and preceding Norway.

At the close of the voting "September, gouden roos" had received only 1 point (from Luxembourg), placing Belgium joint last (with Austria) of the 16 competing entries. The Belgian jury split its 10 points between Norway (5), Italy (4) and the United Kingdom (1).

According to Dutch newspaper Het vrije volk, conductor Francis Bay was not happy that Belgium didn't receive a single point from the Dutch juries, while the French-speaking countries were "forming a bloc" according to him. He proposed to set up a voting bloc with the Netherlands and the Scandinavian countries.

=== Voting ===
Every participating broadcaster assembled a jury panel of ten people. Every jury member could give one point to his or her favourite song.

Points awarded to Belgium
Score	Country
1 point	Luxembourg

Points awarded by Belgium
Score	Country
5 points	Norway
4 points	Italy
1 point	United Kingdom
