= Germany in the Eurovision Song Contest 1961 =

- Eurovision Song Contest 1961
- Participating broadcaster: ARD (Note: Arbeitsgemeinschaft der öffentlich-rechtlichen Rundfunkanstalten der Bundesrepublik Deutschland) – Hessischer Rundfunk (HR)
- Country: Germany
- Selection process: National final
- Selection date: 25 February 1961

Competing entry
- Song: "Einmal sehen wir uns wieder"
- Artist: Lale Andersen
- Songwriters: Rudolf Maluck; Ernst Bader

Placement
- Final result: 13th, 3 points

Participation chronology

Germany was represented at the Eurovision Song Contest 1961 with the song "Einmal sehen wir uns wieder", composed by Rudolf Maluck, with lyrics by Ernst Bader, and performed by Lale Andersen. The German participating broadcaster on behalf of ARD, Hessischer Rundfunk (HR), selected its entry through a national final.

Andersen was arguably the best-known singer yet to have taken part at Eurovision, being famous throughout Europe and beyond as the originator of "Lili Marleen", an iconic song of the Second World War. Aged 55 on the night of the contest, she was the oldest participant, a record she held until 57-year-old Dado Topić took to the stage for Croatia at the 2007 contest.

== Before Eurovision ==
=== National final ===
The national final was held on 25 February at the Kurtheater in Bad Homburg vor der Höhe, hosted by Heinz Schenk. Thirteen songs took part, with the winner being decided by a 21-member jury. It is not known by what method the songs were scored, and only the top four placements are currently known. One of the other participants was Christa Williams, who had represented Switzerland at the 1959 contest.

Final - 25 February 1961
R/O	Artist	Song	Place
1	Dieter Heck	"Was tut man nicht alles aus Liebe"	—N/a
2	Friedel Hensch	"Colombino (ich weiß ein Tag wird kommen)"	—N/a
3	Franck Forster	"Es war ein reizender Abend"	3
4	Christa Williams	"Pedro"	—N/a
5	Fred Bertelmann	"Ticke-ticke-tack"	2
6	Heinz Sagner	"Jeden Tag voll Sonnenschein"	—N/a
7	Renée Franke	"Napolitano"	—N/a
8	Rolf Simson	"Wer das Spiel kennt"	3
9	Ernst Lothar	"Dich hat das Schicksal für mich bestimmt"	—N/a
10	Lale Andersen	"Einmal sehen wir uns wieder"	1
11	Bobby Franco	"Langsamer Walzer"	—N/a
12	Peggy Brown	"Du bist meine Welt"	—N/a
13	Detlef Engel	"Nach Mitternacht"	—N/a

== At Eurovision ==
On the night of the final Lale Andersen performed 8th in the running order, following Sweden and preceding France. The song featured Andersen's trademark spoken-word singing style and was also unusual for including a refrain sung entirely in French, which was legitimate as at the time the European Broadcasting Union had yet to introduce any specific rules regarding language of performance. However "Einmal sehen wir uns wieder" failed to find much favour with the international jurors, picking up just 3 points and placing Germany 13th of the 16 entries. The German jury awarded 5 of its 10 points to contest winners Luxembourg.

=== Voting ===
Every participating broadcaster assembled a jury panel of ten people. Every jury member could give one point to his or her favourite song.

Points awarded to Germany
Score	Country
1 point	Austria; Denmark; Sweden

Points awarded by Germany
Score	Country
5 points	Luxembourg
4 points	France
1 point	Netherlands
