= Tom Pillibi =

1960 song by Jacqueline Boyer

Single by Jacqueline Boyer
- Language: French
- Released: 10 April 1960
- Length: 3:00
- Label: Columbia
- Composer: André Popp
- Lyricist: Pierre Cour

Eurovision Song Contest 1960 entry
- Country: France
- Artist: Jacqueline Boyer
- Language: French
- Composer: André Popp
- Lyricist: Pierre Cour
- Conductor: Franck Pourcel

Finals performance
- Final result: 1st
- Final points: 32

Entry chronology
- ◄ "Oui, oui, oui, oui" (1959)
- "Printemps, avril carillonne" (1961) ►

Official performance video
- "Tom Pillibi" on YouTube

"Tom Pillibi" is a song recorded by French singer Jacqueline Boyer with music composed by André Popp and French lyrics written by Pierre Cour. It was released as a single on 10 April 1960. It represented France in the Eurovision Song Contest 1960 held in London, winning the contest. It was covered by several artists including Julie Andrews.

== Background ==
=== Conception ===
"Tom Pillibi" was composed by André Popp with French lyrics by Pierre Cour. It is a moderately up-tempo number, with the singer talking about her lover – the title character. She describes his material wealth – two castles, ships, other women wanting to be with him. She then admits that he has "only one fault", that being that he is "such a liar" and that none of what she had previously said about him was true. Nonetheless, she sings, she still loves him. It was recorded by Jacqueline Boyer and released as a single on 10 April 1960.

Boyer recorded an English-language version of the song that while still about the same man, conveyed quite a different impression. In this version, Tom is a compulsive womaniser and not to be trusted at all. Perhaps as a result of this, Des Mangan's book on Contest history confuses the issue further by describing the song as being about "a man with two castles and two boats and who's generally a right bastard, but she still loves him anyway." She also recorded a German-language version, under the same title.

=== Eurovision ===
The Radiodiffusion-Télévision Française (RTF) internally selected the song as its entrant for the 5th edition of the Eurovision Song Contest.

On 29 March 1960, the Eurovision Song Contest was held at the Royal Festival Hall in London hosted by the British Broadcasting Corporation (BBC) and broadcast live throughout the continent. Boyer performed "Tom Pillibi" thirteenth and last on the evening, following Italy's "Romantica" by Renato Rascel. Franck Pourcel conducted the event's live orchestra in the performance of the French entry.

At the close of voting, it had received 32 points, placing first in a field of thirteen, and winning the contest. It was the first Eurovision winner to be performed last. It was succeeded as contest winner in 1961 by "Nous les amoureux" by Jean-Claude Pascal for Luxembourg. It was succeeded as French representative that year by "Printemps, avril carillonne" by Jean-Paul Mauric.

=== Aftermath ===
Boyer performed her song in the Eurovision twenty-fifth anniversary show Songs of Europe held on 22 August 1981 in Mysen.

== Legacy ==
"Tom Pillibi" gained several recordings by internationally known and national well-established figures, including other Eurovision representatives, on the same year of the original release. Actress and singer Julie Andrews, recorded the song in English in April 1960. Laila Kinnunen, one of Finland's most popular singers and the country's 1961 Eurovision debutante, recorded a Finnish version on 14 June 1960, as well as Sweden's 1962 Eurovision representative Inger Berggren.

Preceded by "Een beetje" by Teddy Scholten	Eurovision Song Contest winners 1960	Succeeded by "Nous les amoureux" by Jean-Claude Pascal
