= Är du kär i mej ännu Klas-Göran? =

Song by Lill-Babs
- Language: Swedish
- Released: 1959
- Genre: schlager
- Label: Karusell
- Songwriter: Stig Anderson

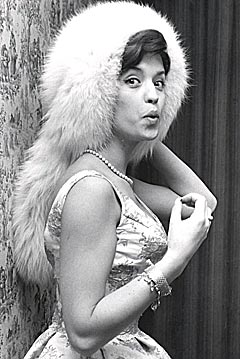
Lill-Babs in Cannes

"Är du kär i mej ännu Klas-Göran?" ("Are you still in love with me, Klas-Göran?") is a song written by Stig "Stikkan" Andersson in 1959. A recording by singer Lill-Babs from 1959 became a major hit song and solid gold record in Sweden in 1960, Dutch singer Ria Valk had a hit record in The Netherlands in 1961 with a translation of the song, titled "Hou je echt nog van mij, Rocking Billy?".

== Charts ==
Chart (1959)	Peak position
Finland (Suomen virallinen lista)	7
