= Isabelle Aubret =

French singer

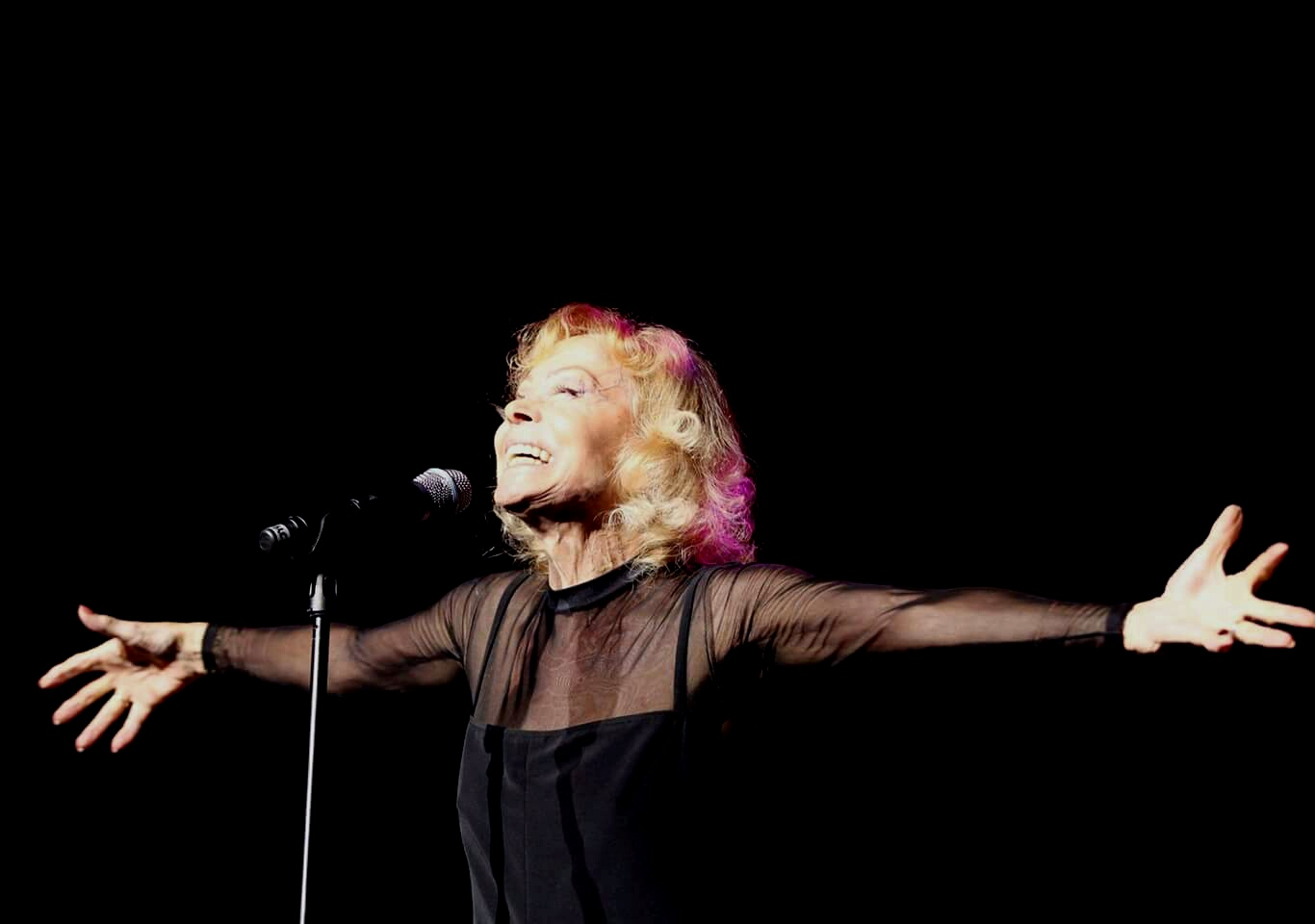
- Aubret in 2017

Background information
- Born: Thérèse Coquerelle; 27 July 1938 (age 87); Lille, France
- Occupation: Singer
- Years active: 1956–present

Isabelle Aubret (French pronunciation: [izabɛl obʁɛ]; born Thérèse Coquerelle; 27 July 1938) is a French singer best known for winning the Eurovision Song Contest in 1962 with the song "Un premier amour".

== Early life ==
Thérèse Coquerelle was born in Lille, France, on 27 July 1938. She was the fifth of eleven children; her father was a foreman in a spinning mill, while her mother, of Ukrainian origin, was a housewife. Coquerelle trained in gymnastics as a child, and in 1952 she won the national French Gymnastics Championship. That same year, she left school and was hired as a winder in the Lemaire-Destombes factory in Saint-André, where her father worked.

A few years later, she returned to this spinning mill to sing in the theatre of her family house, as part of a radio program. She continued to take drama and classical dance classes. At the same time, she participated in local singing competitions. Her drama teacher introduced her to the director of a Lille radio station, and Coquerelle took the stage for the first time. She sang in ensembles, and in 1956, at the age of eighteen, she joined an orchestra in Le Havre. In 1960 she won a singing competition at the Olympia, where she was noticed by the director of the room, Bruno Coquatrix. After Coquerelle secured a cabaret spot in Pigalle, she released her debut single "Nous les Amoureux" in 1961 under the name Isabelle Aubret.

== Career ==
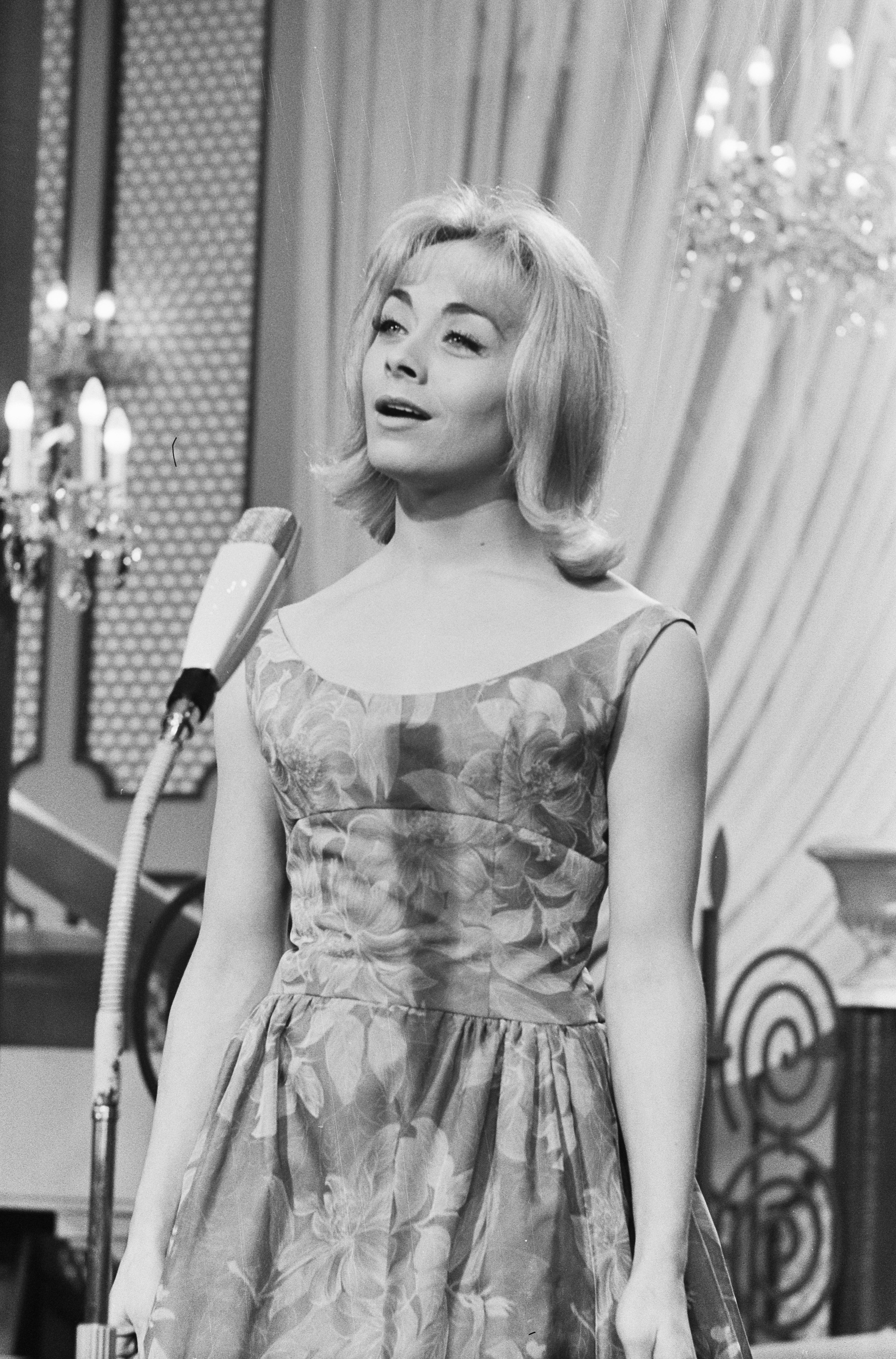
Aubret at the Eurovision Song Contest in 1962

Aubret won the Eurovision Song Contest in 1962, representing France and singing "Un premier amour" ("A first love") with music composed by Claude-Henri Vic and lyrics by Roland Stéphane Valade. In 1963, she was approached by director Jacques Demy and musician Michel Legrand for the main role of the film Les parapluies de Cherbourg, but Aubret was subsequently injured in a car accident when her car skidded on a bend. One person died and three were seriously injured, including pianist Serge Sentis. Aubret was hospitalized in Autun, going through multiple operations and a long rehabilitation. In 1968, she returned to Eurovision and again represented France, this time singing "La source" ("The Spring/Fountain") with music by Daniel Faure and lyrics by Henri Dijan and Guy Bonnet.

Aubret was a participant in the French national heats for Eurovision in other years. Her first attempt was in 1961 with the song "Le gars de n'importe où". She was awarded second place. Another runner-up spot came Aubret's way in 1970 when she teamed up with Daniel Beretta for the song "Olivier, Olivia". She was not as successful with her 1976 effort, "Je te connais déjà", which finished sixth out of seven songs in the second semi-final. Her final challenge for Eurovision came in 1983 with the patriotic "France, France", which took her to third place.

Working with French composer Michel Colombier, Aubret co-produced the song "C'est Ainsi Que Les Choses Arrivent" for Jean-Pierre Melville's 1972 film Un Flic. In 1981, Aubret had another accident. She was rehearsing a flying trapeze number for the Union of Artists Gala with her partner, boxer Jean-Claude Bouttier, when she fell and broke both legs. It took two years of rehabilitation for her to walk again.

In 2001, she celebrated her forty-year career by giving a series of concerts at Bobino.

== Personal life ==
Aubret is married to Gérard Meys.

== Partial discography ==
- Isabelle Aubret (1969)
- Liberté (1981)
- Le monde chante (1984)
- Vague à l'homme (1987)
- 1989 (1989)
- Vivre en flèche (1990)
- In love (1991)
- Coups de cœur (1992)
- Isabelle Aubret chante Aragon (1992)
- Isabelle Aubret chante Ferrat (1993)
- C'est le bonheur (1993)
- Isabelle Aubret chante Brel (1995)
- Isabelle Aubret chante pour les petits et les grands (1997)
- Changer le monde (1997)
- Parisabelle (1999)
- Le paradis des musiciens (2001)
- Cosette et Jean Valjean (2002)
- Les Indispensables (2005)
- 2006 (2006)

Awards and achievements
| Preceded by (Luxembourg) Jean-Claude Pascal with "Nous les amoureux" | Winner of the Eurovision Song Contest; 1962 | Succeeded by (Denmark) Grethe and Jørgen Ingmann with "Dansevise" |
| Preceded by Jean-Paul Mauric with "Printemps, avril carillonne" | France in the Eurovision Song Contest; 1962 | Succeeded by Alain Barrière with "Elle était si jolie" |
| Preceded by Noëlle Cordier with "Il doit faire beau là-bas" | France in the Eurovision Song Contest; 1968 | Succeeded by Frida Boccara with "Un jour, un enfant" |
