= Yugoslavia in the Eurovision Song Contest 1961 =

- Eurovision Song Contest 1961
- Participating broadcaster: Jugoslavenska radiotelevizija (JRT)
- Country: Yugoslavia
- Selection process: Jugovizija 1961
- Selection date: 16 February 1961

Competing entry
- Song: "Neke davne zvezde"
- Artist: Ljiljana Petrović
- Songwriters: Jože Privšek; Miroslav Antić

Placement
- Final result: 8th, 9 points

Participation chronology

Yugoslavia was represented at the Eurovision Song Contest 1961 with the song "Neke davne zvezde", composed by Jože Privšek, with lyrics by Miroslav Antić, and performed by Ljiljana Petrović. The Yugoslavian participating broadcaster, Jugoslavenska radiotelevizija (JRT), selected its entry through the first edition of Jugovizija. This was the first-ever entry from Yugoslavia in the Eurovision Song Contest, and the first-ever entry performed in Serbo-Croatian in the contest.

== Before Eurovision ==
=== Jugovizija 1961 ===
Jugoslavenska radiotelevizija (JRT) held the first edition of Jugovizija on 16 February at the Ljubljana Slovene National Theatre Drama in Ljubljana to select its entry in the Eurovision Song Contest 1961. The show was staged by RTV Ljubljana and hosted by Milanka Bavcon. There were nine songs in the final, from three JRT subnational affiliates: RTV Ljubljana, RTV Zagreb, and RTV Belgrade. The winner was chosen by the votes of an eight-member jury of experts, one juror for each of the six Yugoslavian republics and the two autonomous provinces. The winning entry was "Neke davne zvezde", composed by Jože Privšek, with lyrics by Miroslav Antić, and performed by Serbian singer Ljiljana Petrović.

Final – 16 February 1961
| R/O | Broadcaster | Artist | Song | Points | Place |
|---|---|---|---|---|---|
| 1 | (Socialist Republic of Slovenia) RTV Ljubljana | Ljiljana Petrović | "Neke davne zvezde" ("Неке давне звезде") | 19 | 1 |
| 2 | (Socialist Republic of Slovenia) RTV Ljubljana | Marjana Deržaj & Stane Mancini | "Kako sva si različna" | 6 | 5 |
| 3 | (Socialist Republic of Slovenia) RTV Ljubljana | Jelka Cvetezar | "Črni klavir" | 3 | 9 |
| 4 | (Socialist Republic of Croatia) RTV Zagreb | Ivo Robić | "Pjesma o životu" | 11 | 3 |
| 5 | (Socialist Republic of Croatia) RTV Zagreb | Gabi Novak | "Drage misli" | 17 | 2 |
| 6 | (Socialist Republic of Serbia) RTV Belgrade | Lola Novaković | "Plave daljine" | 9 | 4 |
| 7 | (Socialist Republic of Serbia) RTV Belgrade | Anica Zubović | "Sreća" | 4 | 8 |
| 8 | (Socialist Republic of Serbia) RTV Belgrade | Đorđe Marjanović | "Reč il´ dve" | 5 | 7 |
| 9 | (Socialist Republic of Croatia) RTV Zagreb | Duo Hani | "Obećaj mi to" | 6 | 5 |

== At Eurovision ==
The contest was broadcast on Televizija Beograd, Televizija Ljubljana (with commentary by Saša Novak) and Televizija Zagreb. It was also broadcast on radio stations Radio Beograd 1 and Radio Ljubljana 2.

Ljiljana Petrović performed "Neke davne zvezde" 5th on the evening of the contest following Finland and preceding Netherlands. At the close of the voting the song had received 9 points, placing 8th equal in a field of 16 competing countries.

=== Voting ===
The Yugoslav jury was made up of 3 members each from the Belgrade, Ljubljana and Zagreb studios.

Points awarded to Yugoslavia
| Score | Country |
|---|---|
| 3 points | Austria |
| 2 points | France |
| 1 point | Denmark; Netherlands; Switzerland; United Kingdom |

Points awarded by Yugoslavia
| Score | Country |
|---|---|
| 5 points | Luxembourg |
| 2 points | Netherlands |
| 1 point | Italy; Norway; Switzerland |
