= Ljiljana Petrović =

Bosnia and Herzegovina singer (1939–2020)

Ljiljana Petrović Љиљана Петровић
- Born: 1939; Bosanski Brod, Yugoslavia
- Died: 4 February 2020 (aged 80–81) Novi Sad, Serbia
- Years active: 1959-1980

Ljiljana Petrović (Serbian Cyrillic: Љиљана Петровић; 1939 – 4 February 2020) was a Serbian singer. She was born in Bosanski Brod, but was brought up in Novi Sad. She began to sing at local clubs and restaurants, and performed at a festival in Mali Lošinj in 1960, where she was noticed by the head of the artists and repertoire division at the record label Jugoton. In 1961, Petrović represented Yugoslavia in the Eurovision Song Contest 1961 with the song "Neke davne zvezde" (Some ancient stars). Petrović finished in 8th place receiving 9 points. Subsequently, she continued to record music until the late 1970s, at which point she retired from public life until the late 1980s, when she became an author, releasing a book of poetry in 1991.

Petrović died on 4 February 2020, aged 81.

== See also ==
- Gabi Novak

Preceded by N/A	Yugoslavia in the Eurovision Song Contest; 1961	Succeeded by Lola Novaković with "Ne pali svetla u sumrak"
