= Lill-Babs =

Swedish singer (1938–2018)

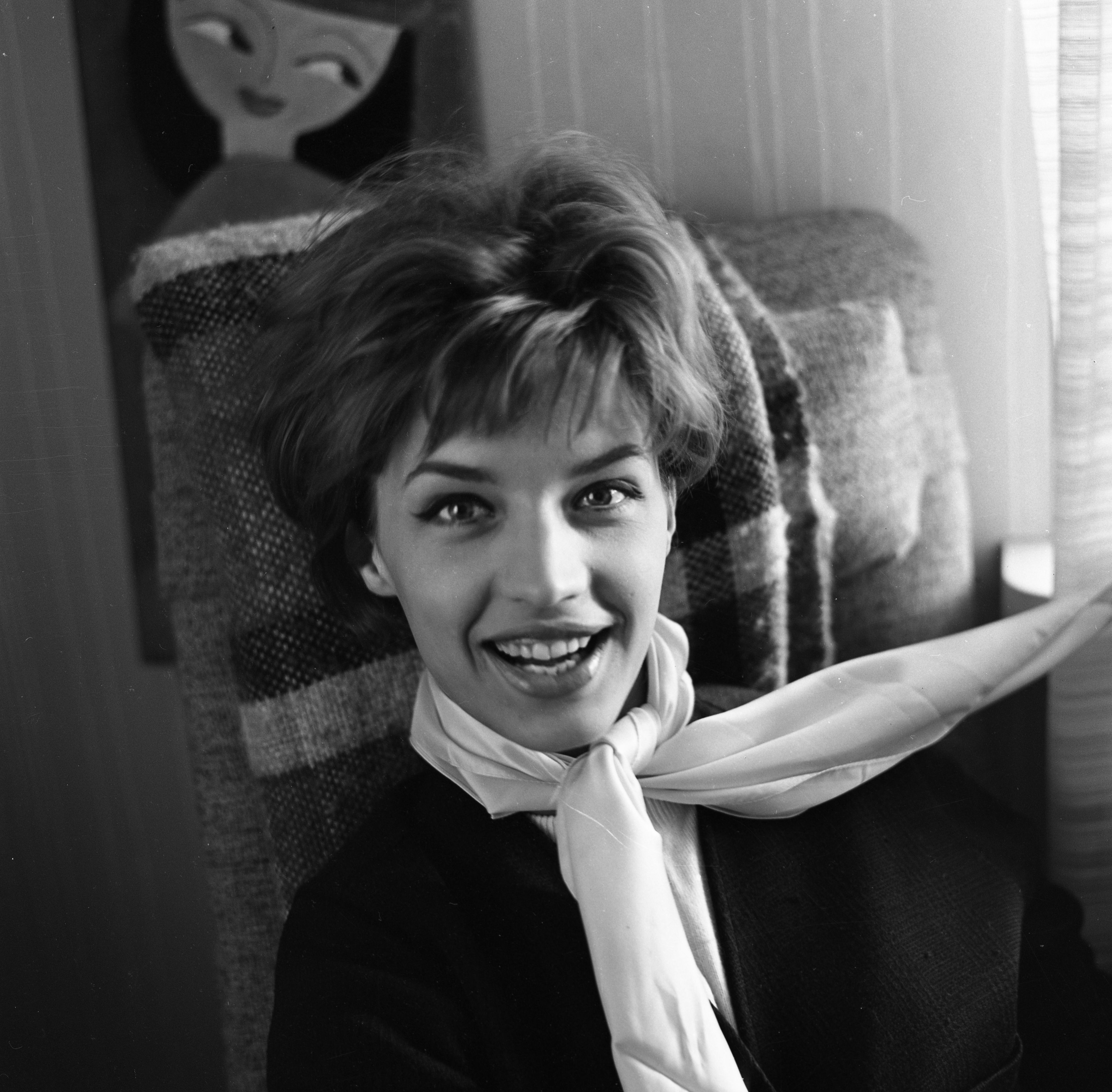
- Lill-Babs in 1961

Background information
- Born: Barbro Margareta Svensson; 9 March 1938; Järvsö, Sweden
- Died: 3 April 2018 (aged 80) Stockholm, Sweden
- Occupations: Singer; actress; television host
- Years active: 1953–2018
- Spouses: Lasse Berghagen (m. 1965; div. 1968) Kjell Kaspersen (m. 1969; div. 1973)
- Website: lill-babs.com
- Musical career
- Genres: Pop; soul
- Instruments: Vocals

Barbro Margareta Svensson (9 March 1938 – 3 April 2018), known by her stage name Lill-Babs, was a Swedish singer, actress and television host. From the early 1950s until her death in 2018, she was one of Sweden's best-known and most popular singers. She represented Sweden in the Eurovision Song Contest 1961 with the song "April, april". She was also well known for the song "Är du kär i mej ännu Klas-Göran?" ("Are You Still in Love with Me, Klas-Göran?").

== Early life and career ==
Lill-Babs was born Barbro Svensson in Järvsö, 290 km (180 mi) north of Stockholm. She lived with her parents, Ragnar and Britta Svensson, for nine years in a small cottage without running water. She first sang in a church at age 11. Her first public appearance was with a colleague of her father accompanying her on the accordion.

Svensson's first public performance was at Barnens dag in Järvsö 1953. Soon after, she started singing with Lasse Schönning's orchestra. She was "discovered" when she sang on the radio program Morgonkvisten ("Early Morning") in 1954. Simon Brehm, a musician and record producer, liked her and took her to Stockholm where she made her professional singing debut at the Bal Palais restaurant. Brehm was Svensson's manager until his death in 1967. He gave Svensson her stage name "Lill-Babs", a play on words as a connection to the older, and at that time better known, singer Alice Babs. She released her first music album in 1954, a gramophone record with two songs: "Min mammas boogie" ("My Mamma's Boogie") and "Svar till 'Ung och kär'" ("Answer to 'Young And In Love'"). Soon afterwards, finding herself pregnant, she returned to Järvsö and gave birth to a daughter, Monica.

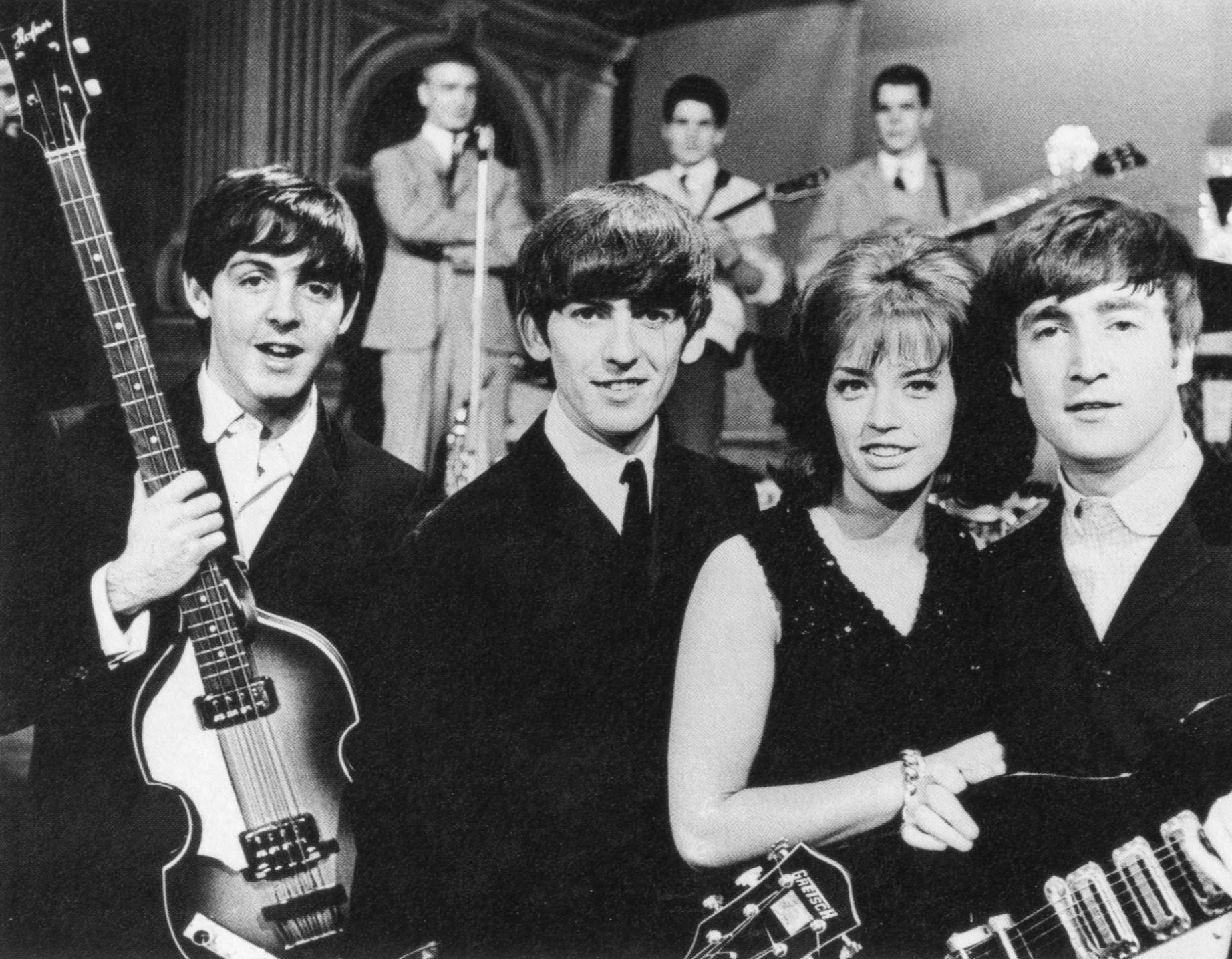
Lill-Babs and The Beatles as guest stars on Drop-In, 1963

Lill-Babs made her television debut in 1957 and her first folkpark show using her birth name in 1958. She visited every folk park in Sweden during her long career

In 1959, Lill-Babs performed Stikkan Anderson's song "Är du kär i mej ännu Klas-Göran?" ("Are You Still in Love with Me, Klas-Göran?"); her recording of it became a major hit. She made her theater debut in 1958 in the play Fly mig en greve ("Fly Me a Count") at Nöjeskatten theater. She also appeared in the films Svenska Floyd and En nolla för mycket ("One Zero Too Many").

== Eurovision and later career ==
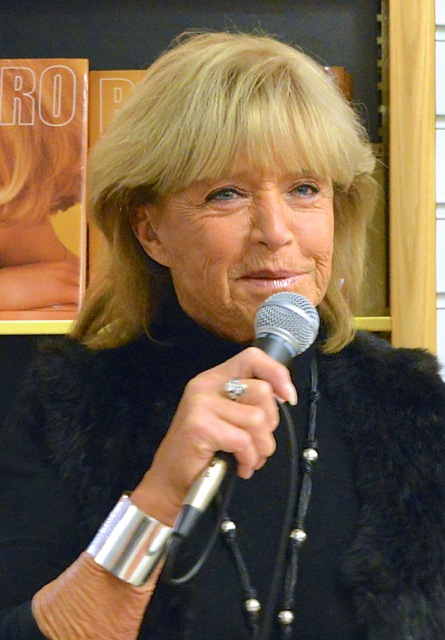
Lill-Babs in 2013

Lill-Babs represented Sweden in the Eurovision Song Contest 1961 with the song "April, april". It had been performed by Siw Malmkvist in the national final, but Lill-Babs was selected to perform the song in Cannes. She participated in Melodifestivalen three times in 1960, 1961 (her own two songs did not win) and in 1973 without winning. In 1969, she participated in the Norwegian Melodi Grand Prix with the song "Juksemaker pipelort", written by Rolv Wesenlund and composed by Sigurd Jansen, and placed in last place with 0 points. Soon after Eurovision, she launched a career in West Germany, where she acted in several films. She also released two English-language solo singles for the United States market.

Lill-Babs met The Beatles in 1963 when she was the main guest star on the teen music show Drop-In broadcast on Sveriges Television (SVT). The then-unknown band asked for her autograph. Lill-Babs performed several shows in bars at Berns in Stockholm, Trädgår'n in Gothenburg and Kronprinsen in Malmö. Björn Ulvaeus and Benny Andersson of ABBA wrote and produced her 1971 hit song "Welcome to the World". The four future members of ABBA sang on it. Also in the 1970s she played in a Kar de Mumma revue at Folkan, and played Annie Oakley in the musical Annie Get Your Gun at Scandinavium arena in Gothenburg.

== Television ==
Lill-Babs was the main guest on Här är ditt liv (Swedish version of "This Is Your Life") on 26 December 1983 when the host Lasse Holmqvist surprised her in the studio with a long line of ex-boyfriends.

She was the presenter on several TV shows like Hemma hos Lill-Babs (1987) ("At Home with Lill-Babs"), Morgonlust (1988) ("Morning Desire"), Vem tar vem (1990) ("Who Takes Whom"), and Cocktail (1991) all on SVT.

In 2010, she participated in the television show Så mycket bättre ("That Much Better"), broadcast on TV4. In 2012, Lill-Babs appeared on Stjärnorna på slottet ("Stars at the Palace"), broadcast on SVT, where she spoke about her career. In 2017 and 2018, she acted as a lesbian character Gugge in two seasons of the SVT series Bonusfamiljen; the series' script had to be changed following her death.

A two-part documentary was broadcast on TV4 in 2017 called Lill-Babs, Leva livet ("Lill-Babs, to Live Life"), which presented her life and career.

== Death and tributes ==
Lill-Babs died on 3 April 2018, following cancer and heart failure.

On the day of her death, both SVT and TV4 changed their programming so that programs about Lill-Babs could air. SVT broadcast the 2004 biographical documentary Lill-Babs i 50 år ("Lill-Babs for 50 Years"), including the TV4 documentary from 2017.

Her funeral was at Järvsö Church on 28 May the same year and she was buried in the churchyard there.

== Personal life ==
Lill-Babs was married to the singer Lasse Berghagen 1965–1968. She was then married to Norwegian footballer Kjell Kaspersen 1969–1973. She had three daughters: Monica Svensson (born 1955), Malin Berghagen (born 1966), and Kristin Kaspersen (born 1969). Her younger brother Lasse Svensson used to be the drummer for rock group Tages (and subsequently Blond) 1967–1969.

She released her autobiography Hon är jag ("She Is I") in 1996.

In 2017, she was inducted into the Swedish Music Hall of Fame.

Lill-Babs was a known supporter of AIK.

== Discography ==
=== Albums ===
(Source: Discogs artist page)

- 1962: Splorr
- 1964: Svensson hyllar Alpertsson
- 1967: Lill-Babs
- 1968: Lill-Babs
- 1971: Välkommen till världen
- 1972: Jag ska sjunga för dig
- 1973: Hurra hurra
- 1975: Det våras för Barbro
- 1976: Lev mänska lev
- 1977: På scen
- 1979: Till mina vänner
- 1982: Lill-Babs i en show av Lars Forssell
- 1982: Det är ju min show! (på cd 1998)
- 1984: Barbro
- 1998: Who's Sorry Now
- 2005: Här är jag

== Filmography ==
(Source: Swedish Film Database)

- 1956: Suss gott
- 1959: Fly mej en greve
- 1961: Svenska Floyd
- 1962: The Turkish Cucumbers
- 1962: En nolla för mycket
- 1965: Pang i bygget
- 1965: Calle P
- 1989: Imorron och imorron och imorron
- 1990: Vem tar vem (TV show)
- 1998: Mulan (Swedish voice and singing as Grandmother Fa)
- 2002: Rederiet (guest role)
- 2012: Den sista dokusåpan
- 2017: Bonusfamiljen (TV series)

Awards and achievements
Preceded by Siw Malmkvist with "Alla andra får varann"	Sweden in the Eurovision Song Contest; 1961	Succeeded by Inger Berggren with "Sol och vår"
