= United Kingdom in the Eurovision Song Contest 1961 =

- Eurovision Song Contest 1961
- Participating broadcaster: British Broadcasting Corporation (BBC)
- Country: United Kingdom
- Selection process: A Song for Europe
- Selection date: 15 February 1961

Competing entry
- Song: "Are You Sure?"
- Artist: The Allisons
- Songwriters: John Alford; Bob Day

Placement
- Final result: 2nd, 24 points

Participation chronology

The United Kingdom was represented at the Eurovision Song Contest 1961 with the song "Are You Sure?", written by John Alford and Bob Day, and performed by themselves as the Allisons. The British participating broadcaster, the British Broadcasting Corporation (BBC), selected its entry through a national final. The entry came 2nd in the contest and reached No. 2 in the UK singles chart.

== Before Eurovision ==
=== A Song for Europe ===
The British Broadcasting Corporation (BBC) held a national pre-selection to choose the song that would go to the Eurovision Song Contest 1961. It was held on 15 February 1961 and presented by Katie Boyle. The songs were voted on by a total of 120 jurors aged between 19 and 40 who were divided into 12 juries of ten in the following cities: Aberdeen, Glasgow, Belfast, Leeds, Bangor, Manchester, Norwich, Birmingham, Cardiff, London, Bristol, and Southampton.

The Eric Robinson Orchestra supplied the music and vocal backing was provided by the Beryl Stott Singers.

Final – 15 February 1961
R/O	Artist(s)	Song	Votes	Place
1	Mark Wynter	"Dream Girl"	16	4
2	Craig Douglas	"The Girl Next Door"	3	7
3	Ricky Valance	"Why Can't We?"	24	3
4	Bryan Johnson	"A Place in the Country"	6	5
5	Anne Shelton	"I Will Light a Candle"	4	6
6	Steve Arlen	"Suddenly I'm in Love"	30	2
7	Valerie Masters	"Too Late for Tears"	3	7
8	Teresa Duffy	"Tommy"	3	7
9	The Allisons	"Are You Sure?"	31	1

== At Eurovision ==
=== Voting ===
Every participating broadcaster assembled a jury of ten people. Every jury member could give one point to his or her favourite song.

Points awarded to the United Kingdom
Score	Country
8 points	Luxembourg
7 points	Switzerland
3 points	Netherlands; Spain
1 point	Belgium; Denmark; Italy

Points awarded by the United Kingdom
Score	Country
2 points	Finland; France; Switzerland
1 point	Austria; Monaco; Spain; Yugoslavia
