= Kjell Kaspersen =

Norwegian footballer (1939–2025)

Kjell Kaspersen (7 April 1939 – 15 November 2025) was a Norwegian footballer. For many years he was goalkeeper for Skeid and the Norway national team. He was league champion in 1966, and was elected Player of the Year by Verdens Gang in 1964.

Kaspersen was capped 34 times for Norway. In a friendly match versus Thailand in 1965 he scored from a penalty kick, thereby being the only goalkeeper to score for Norway.

He was married to Swedish singer Lill-Babs between 1969 and 1973. Their daughter is Swedish television personality Kristin Kaspersen. Kjell Kaspersen died on 15 November 2025, at the age of 86.
