= Bob Benny =

Belgian singer and stage performer

Background information
- Born: Emilius Wagemans; 18 May 1926
- Origin: Sint-Niklaas, Belgium
- Died: 29 March 2011 (aged 84)
- Genres: Pop, musical theatre, schlager
- Occupation: Singer

Bob Benny (18 May 1926 – 29 March 2011), born Emilius Wagemans, was a Belgian singer and musical theatre performer, who participated in the Eurovision Song Contests of 1959 and 1961.

== Early career ==
Benny began his singing career at the end of World War II when he started performing regularly at a café in Sint-Niklaas. By the early 1950s, he had regular spots on radio and released his first album Mijn haart spreekt tot u (My Heart Speaks to You). In 1957, he had his first hit single with "Cindy, Oh Cindy", which reached No. 2 on the Belgian chart.

== Eurovision Song Contest ==
In 1959, Benny was chosen, with the song "Hou toch van mij" ("Do Love Me"), as the Belgian representative in the fourth Eurovision Song Contest which took place on 11 March in Cannes, France. Hou toch van mij received votes from five of the other 10 participating countries and finished in sixth place.

In 1961, Benny was again selected to represent Belgium, with the song "September, gouden roos" ("September, Golden Rose"), in the sixth Eurovision, which again was held in Cannes, on 18 March. Although the contest had now expanded to 16 participants, "September, gouden roos" only managed to pick up one point from Luxembourg, consigning Benny to a joint last-place finish with Austria's Jimmy Makulis.

== Later career ==
Benny had two further hit singles in 1963, Waar en wanneer (#3) and Alleen door jou (#5). He became a musical theatre performer and played in many long-running shows in Belgium and Germany.

In 2001, Benny suffered a stroke and fell into financial difficulties. A benefit concert on his behalf took place in Antwerp in April 2003, featuring the music of Richard Rodgers performed by well-known Flemish artists. In 2006, Benny celebrated his 80th birthday and claimed he was back to full health.

== Private life ==
In 2001, Benny came out as homosexual.

== Death ==
On 29 March 2011 the Flemish broadcaster Vlaamse Radio- en Televisieomroep (VRT) reported that Benny had died in a nursing home in Sint-Niklaas.

| Preceded by Fud Leclerc with "Ma petite chatte" | Belgium in the Eurovision Song Contest; 1959 | Succeeded by Fud Leclerc with "Mon amour pour toi" |
| Preceded by Fud Leclerc with "Mon amour pour toi" | Belgium in the Eurovision Song Contest; 1961 | Succeeded by Fud Leclerc with "Ton nom" |
