= Angelique and the Sultan =

- French film poster
- Directed by: Bernard Borderie
- Written by: Bernard Borderie; Pascal Jardin; Francis Cosne
- Dialogue by: Pascal Jardin
- Based on: Angelique and the Sultan by Anne and Serge Golon
- Produced by: Francis Cosne; François Chavane
- Starring: Michèle Mercier; Robert Hossein; Jean-Claude Pascal; Aly Ben Ayed; Roger Pigaut; Bruno Dietrich; Helmuth Schneider
- Cinematography: Henri Persin
- Edited by: Christian Gaudin
- Music by: Michel Magne
- Production companies: Compagnie Industrielle et Commerciale Cinématographique Films Borderie; Francos Films; Cinéphonic; Gloria Film; Fono Roma
- Distributed by: S.N. Prodis (France); Gloria Film (West Germany); Euro International Films (Italy)
- Release date: 13 March 1968
- Running time: 105 minutes
- Countries: France; West Germany; Italy
- Language: French
- Box office: 3,380,555 tickets

Angelique and the Sultan (French: Angélique et le Sultan) is a 1968 historical adventure film directed by Bernard Borderie and starring Michèle Mercier, Robert Hossein and Jean-Claude Pascal. It was made as a co-production between France, Italy and West Germany. It was the last entry in the five film series based on the novels by Anne and Serge Golon. A planned sixth film Angelique the Rebel was announced but never made.

The film's sets were designed by the art director Robert Giordani. It was shot at Cinecittà Studios in Rome.

== Cast ==
- Michèle Mercier as Angélique de Peyrac
- Robert Hossein as Jeoffrey de Peyrac
- Jean-Claude Pascal as Osman Ferradji
- Jacques Santi as Vateville
- Helmuth Schneider as Colin Paturel
- Roger Pigaut as le Marquis d'Escrainville
- Ettore Manni as Jason
- Erno Crisa as Turkish Ambassador
- Bruno Dietrich as Corlano
- Pasquale Martino as Savary
- Renato De Carmine as Jason
- Henri Cogan as Bolbec
- Aly Ben Ayed as the Sultan
- Gaby Mesée as favourite of the Sultan
- Vilma Lindamar as Leïla Aïcha
- Manja Golec as the European prisoner in the harem
- Sieghardt Rupp as Millerand

== Production ==
Michèle Mercier said that during the shooting in Tunisia, Habib Jr, the son of President Habib Bourgiba, came to attend the famous scene where she is whipped. "The last day of the shooting, he made give a party in my honor. Some young girls brought me a bellydancer's costume and said: 'The president's son wants you to dance with us tonight.' They try to put silver bracelets on my feet. They are so tight that it takes oil to make them slip off. The evening went well, but afterwards, once I was alone in my room, it was impossible to remove the bracelets. I had to sleep with them on. I kept them as a souvenir," Mercier said.

== Bibliography ==
- Bergfelder, Tim. International Adventures: German Popular Cinema and European Co-Productions in the 1960s. Berghahn Books, 2005.
- Klossner, Michael. The Europe of 1500-1815 on Film and Television: A Worldwide Filmography of Over 2550 Works, 1895 Through 2000. McFarland & Company, 2002.
