= Denmark in the Eurovision Song Contest 1961 =

- Eurovision Song Contest 1961
- Participating broadcaster: Danmarks Radio (DR)
- Country: Denmark
- Selection process: Dansk Melodi Grand Prix 1961
- Selection date: 19 February 1961

Competing entry
- Song: "Angelique"
- Artist: Dario Campeotto
- Songwriter: Aksel V. Rasmussen

Placement
- Final result: 5th, 12 points

Participation chronology

Denmark was represented at the Eurovision Song Contest 1961 with the song "Angelique", written by Aksel V. Rasmussen, and performed by Dario Campeotto. The Danish participating broadcaster, Danmarks Radio (DR), organised the Dansk Melodi Grand Prix 1961 in order to select its entry for the contest.

== Before Eurovision ==
=== Melodi Grand Prix 1961 ===
Danmarks Radio (DR) held the Dansk Melodi Grand Prix 1961 on 19 February at the Fredericia Theatre in Fredericia, hosted by Sejr Volmer-Sørensen. Seven songs took part, with the winner chosen by a 10-member jury who each had 3 points to award. They could divide the points however they wished (i.e. they could award 1 point to three different songs, 1 and 2 points to two songs, or all 3 points to one song).

The Dansk Melodi Grand Prix 1961 is noted for the fact that all of Danish previous Eurovision representatives – Birthe Wilke, Gustav Winckler, Raquel Rastenni, and Katy Bødtger – returned for another try.

Melodi Grand Prix - 19 February 1961
| R/O | Artist | Song | Songwriter(s) | Points | Place |
|---|---|---|---|---|---|
| 1 | Pedro Biker | "Min guitar og jeg" | Sven Buemann; Vilfred Kjær | 6 | 3 |
| 2 | Katy Bødtger | "Hamlet" | Harry Jensen; Thøger Olesen | 0 | 5 |
| 3 | Gustav Winckler | "Vi lever kun en enkelt gang" | Alfred Holck; Otto Lington | 0 | 5 |
| 4 | Birthe Wilke | "Jetpilot" | Arvid Müller; Hans Schreiber | 7 | 2 |
| 5 | Otto Brandenburg | "Godnat lille du" | Ida From; Bjarne Hoyer | 3 | 4 |
| 6 | Raquel Rastenni and Grethe Sønck | "Hjemme hos os" | Kjeld Bonfils; Thøger Olesen | 0 | 5 |
| 7 | Dario Campeotto | "Angelique" | Aksel V. Rasmussen | 14 | 1 |

== At Eurovision ==
On the evening of the final Campeotto performed 13th in the running order, following Norway and preceding eventual contest winners Luxembourg. At the close of voting "Angelique" had received 12 points (8 of which came from Norway), placing Denmark joint 5th (with Italy) of the 16 entries. The Danish jury awarded its highest mark of 4 to Italy.

The contest was televised on Danmarks Radio TV and on radio station Program 1, both with commentary by Sejr Volmer-Sørensen.

=== Voting ===
Every participating broadcaster assembled a jury panel of ten people. Every jury member could give one point to his or her favourite song.

Points awarded to Denmark
| Score | Country |
|---|---|
| 8 points | Norway |
| 2 points | Sweden |
| 1 point | Finland; Netherlands |

Points awarded by Denmark
| Score | Country |
|---|---|
| 4 points | Italy |
| 1 point | Finland; Germany; Luxembourg; Norway; United Kingdom; Yugoslavia |
