= Jean-Claude Pascal =

French actor and singer

- Pascal in 1945
- Born: Jean-Claude Villeminot; 24 October 1927; Paris, France
- Died: 5 May 1992 (aged 64); Clichy, France

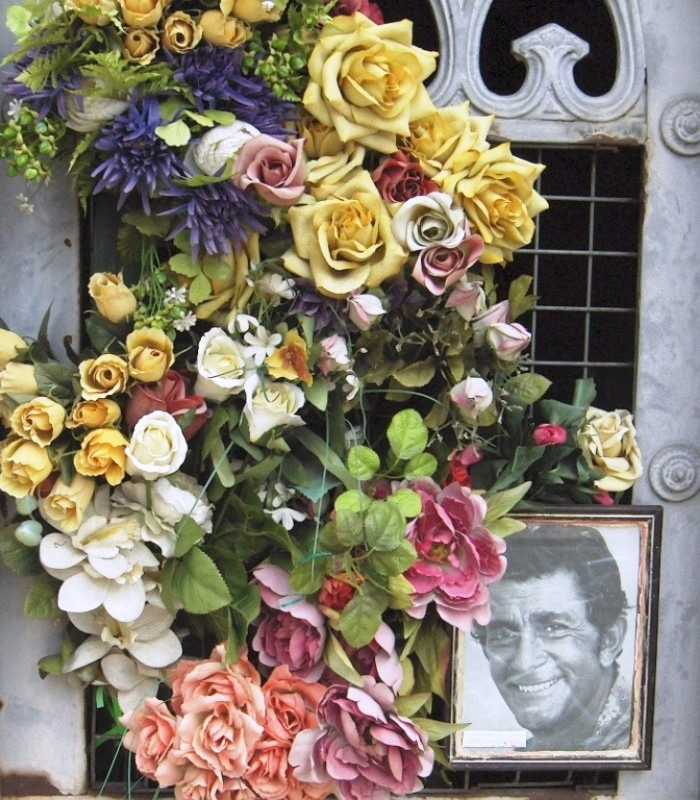
Grave of Jean-Claude Pascal's family in the Montparnasse cemetery in Paris.

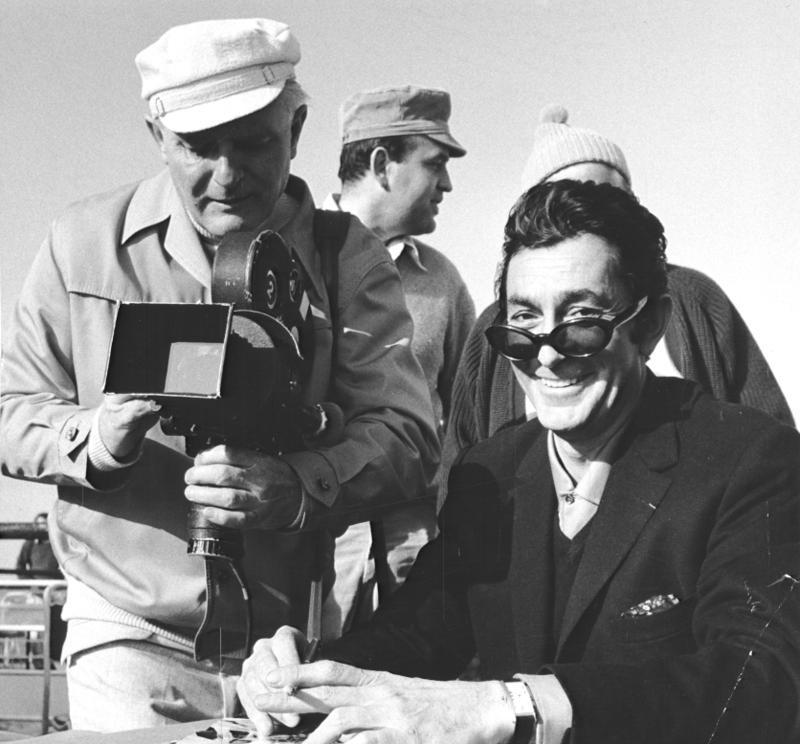
Jean-Claude Pascal, 1968

Jean-Claude Villeminot (24 October 1927 – 5 May 1992), better known as Jean-Claude Pascal (French pronunciation: [ʒɑ̃ klod paskal]), was a French comedian, actor, singer and writer.

== Early life ==
He was born in Paris into a family of wealthy textile manufacturers. His mother, Arlette Lemoine, was the great-granddaughter of English fashion designer Charles Frederick Worth. His father, Roger Villeminot, died the year of his birth.

He began his secondary education in 1938 at the Collège Annel, in Compiègne, and concluded it at the Lycée Janson-de-Sailly in Paris. In 1944, at the age of 17, he enlisted in the 2nd Armored Division of General Leclerc. He was the first French soldier to enter Strasbourg in November 1944, while the German Army was still in the process of evacuating the city. For this, he received the Croix de Guerre in 1945.

== Career ==
After surviving World War II in Strasbourg, Pascal studied at the Sorbonne before turning to fashion-designing for Christian Dior. While working on costumes for the theater production of the play Don Juan, he was exposed to acting. His first acting role was in the film Le jugement de Dieu (1949, released in 1952) and afterwards in "Le rideau cramoisi", 1951, opposite Anouk Aimée, followed by several films including Die schöne Lügnerin (La Belle et l'empereur 1959, 'Beautiful Liar') with Romy Schneider, and Angelique and the Sultan (Angélique et le sultan, 1968) with Michèle Mercier.

Pascal won the 1961 Eurovision Song Contest for Luxembourg with the song "Nous les amoureux" ('We the lovers'), with music composed by Jacques Datin and lyrics by Maurice Vidalin. The song tells the story of a thwarted love between the singer and his lover ("they would like to separate us, they would like to hinder us / from being happy"). The lyrics go on about how the relationship is rejected by others but will finally be possible ("but the time will come. [...] and I will be able to love you without anybody in town talking about it. [...] [God] gave us the right to happiness and joy."). Later, Pascal explained that the song was about a homosexual relationship and the difficulties it faced. As this topic would have been considered controversial in the early 1960s, the lyrics are ambiguous and do not refer to the lovers' gender. This allowed hiding the song's actual message, which was not understood in this way by the general public at the time. Pascal was himself gay, although he never came out during his life.

He later represented Luxembourg again in the 1981 contest and finished 11th of 20 with the song "C'est peut-être pas l'Amérique" ('It may not be America'), with words and music he composed together with Sophie Makhno and Jean-Claude Petit. Pascal died in Clichy, Hauts-de-Seine in 1992, aged 64, of stomach cancer.

== Discography ==
- "Lili Marleen" (French and German)
- "Nous les amoureux"
- "C'est peut-être pas l'Amérique"

== Filmography ==
- Great Man (1951), as L'interne Marcillac
- They Were Five (1952), as Philippe
- Four Red Roses (1951), as Pietro Leandri
- La Forêt de l'adieu (1952), as Jean-Pierre
- Judgement of God (1952), as Albert III, Duke of Bavaria
- The Happiest of Men (1952), as Michel Brissac
- The Crimson Curtain (1953), as The officer
- A Caprice of Darling Caroline (1953), as Livio
- Children of Love (1953), as Doctor Jacques Baurain
- Alarm in Morocco (1953), as Jean Pasqier
- Le Chevalier de la nuit (1953), as Chevalier Georges de Ségar
- Tempest in the Flesh (1954), as Gino
- Royal Affairs in Versailles (1954), as Axel von Fersen
- Flesh and the Woman (1954), as Pierre Martel
- The Three Thieves (1954), as Gastone Cascarilla
- Caroline and the Rebels (1955), as Juan d'Aranda / de Sallanches
- Bad Liaisons (1955), as Blaise Walter
- Lord Rogue (1955), as Lord Henry Seymour
- The Wages of Sin (1956), as Jean de Charvin
- The Lebanese Mission (1956), as Jean Domèvre
- Les Lavandières du Portugal (1957), as Jean-François Aubray
- Guinguette (1959), as Marco
- Island Fishermen (1959), as Guillaume Floury
- Le Fric (1959), as Jacques Moulin
- Die schöne Lügnerin (1959), as Tsar Alexander I
- The Crossroads (1959), as Javier
- The Opportunists (1960), as Philippe Brideau
- Préméditation (1960), as Bernard Sommet
- Rendezvous (1961), as Pierre
- La Salamandre d'or (1962), as Antoine de Montpezat
- Sans merveille (TV film, 1964), as Franck
- Vol 272 (TV miniseries, 1964), as Marc
- Le Faux Pas (TV film, 1965), as Robert
- The Poppy Is Also a Flower (1966), as Galam Khan
- Comment ne pas épouser un milliardaire (TV series, 1966), as Commandant Jean Leroy-Dantec
- Las cuatro bodas de Marisol (1967), as Frank Moore
- Untamable Angelique (1967), as Osman Ferradji
- Angelique and the Sultan (1968), as Osman Ferradji
- Under the Roofs of St. Pauli (1970), as Doctor Pasucha
- Au théâtre ce soir: Les Français à Moscou (TV play, 1972), as Blanchet
- Le Temps de vivre, le temps d'aimer (TV series, 1973), as Jean Moser
- Le Chirurgien de Saint-Chad (TV series, 1976), as Doctor Patrick Villaresi
- Liebe läßt alle Blumen blühen (TV film, 1984), as Marquis de Formentière
- Au théâtre ce soir: Adieu Prudence (TV play, 1985), as Fred Russel

Awards and achievements
Preceded by (France) Jacqueline Boyer with "Tom Pillibi"	Winner of the Eurovision Song Contest; 1961	Succeeded by (France) Isabelle Aubret with "Un premier amour"
Preceded by Camillo Felgen with "So laang we's du do bast"	Luxembourg in the Eurovision Song Contest; 1961	Succeeded by Camillo Felgen with "Petit bonhomme"
Preceded by Sophie & Magaly with "Papa Pingouin"	Luxembourg in the Eurovision Song Contest; 1981	Succeeded by Svetlana with "Cours après le temps"
