= Jean-Paul Mauric =

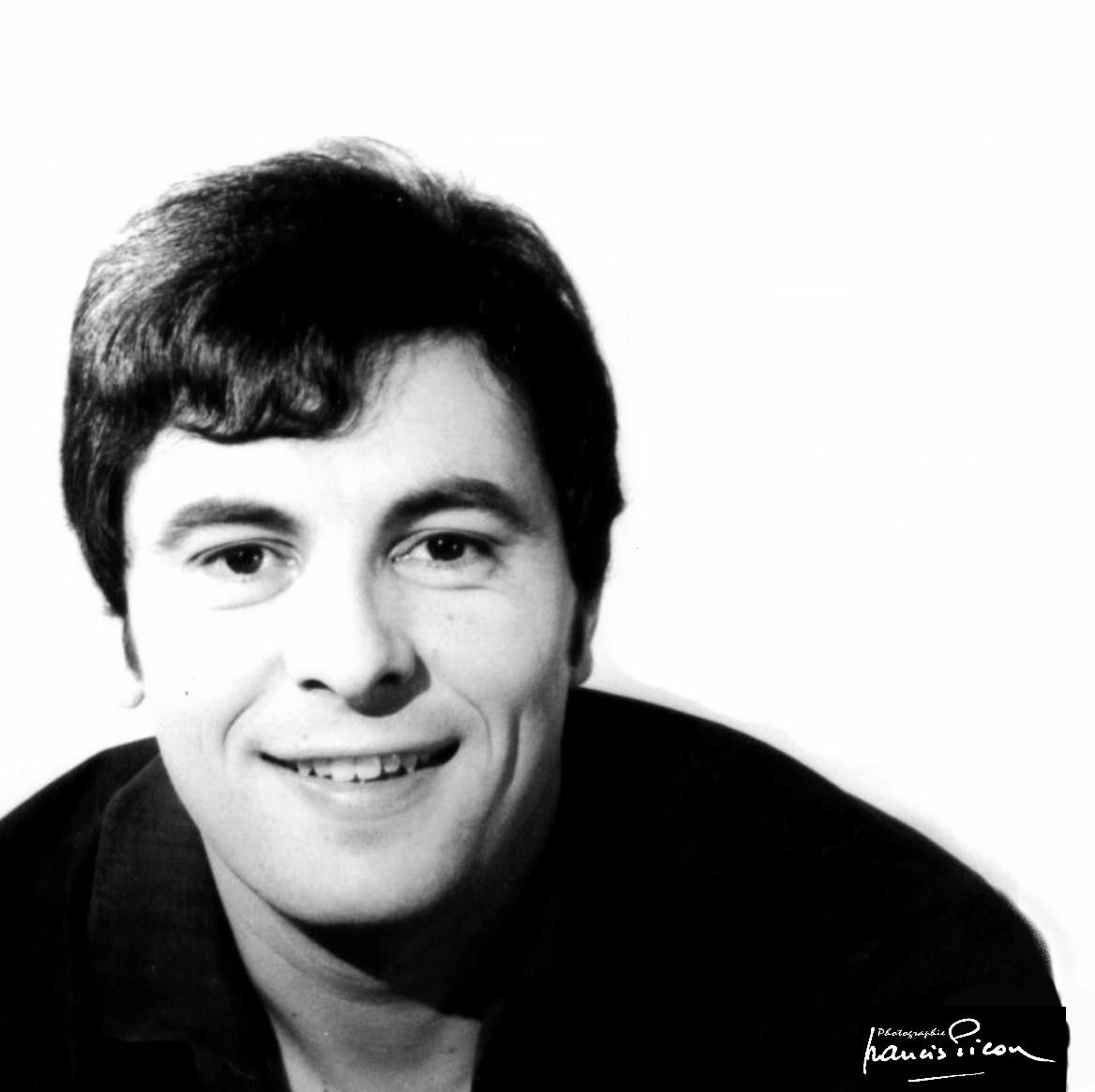

Background information
- Born: 17 June 1933; Hyères, France
- Origin: Hyères, France
- Died: 5 January 1971 (aged 37) Marseille, France
- Genres: Pop, chanson
- Occupation: Singer

Jean-Paul Mauric (French pronunciation: [ʒɑ̃ pɔl moʁik], 17 June 1933, Hyères, Var – 5 January 1971, Marseille) was a French singer, best known for his participation in the 1961 Eurovision Song Contest.

Mauric studied at the Conservatoire de Toulon, and after touring around Provence as an orchestra singer, he obtained a record contract as a result of winning a talent contest at the Théâtre Marigny in Paris in 1957. From 1958, Mauric released a series of popular EPs, and in 1961 was chosen to represent France in the sixth Eurovision Song Contest, held on his home ground in Cannes on 18 March. Mauric's uptempo song "Printemps, avril carillonne" ("Springtime, April calling") finished in a respectable fourth place of the 16 entries. Its lyric of "Bing et bong et bing et bong..." is often cited as setting a precedent which would become very prolific in later Eurovisions.

Mauric's record releases tailed off as the 1960s progressed, but he remained a popular live performer. His career was cut short when he was taken ill in December 1970, and died on 5 January 1971 from complications of cardiomyopathic disease, aged 37.

Preceded by Jacqueline Boyer with Tom Pillibi	France in the Eurovision Song Contest; 1961	Succeeded by Isabelle Aubret with Un premier amour
