= Jacqueline Boyer =

French singer and actress (born 1941)

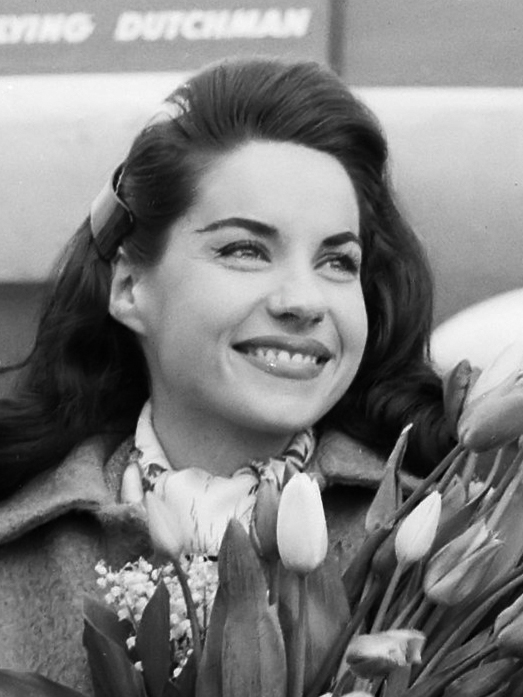
- Boyer in 1960
- Born: Eliane Ducos; 23 April 1941 (age 85); Paris, France
- Occupations: Singer, actress
- Known for: Winning the Eurovision Song Contest in 1960
- Parents: Jacques Pills (father); Lucienne Boyer (mother)
- Musical career

Eliane Ducos (born 23 April 1941), known professionally as Jacqueline Boyer (French pronunciation: [ʒaklin bwaje]), is a French singer and actress. She is also the daughter of performers Jacques Pills and Lucienne Boyer.

In 1960, she won the Eurovision Song Contest for France singing "Tom Pillibi", with music composed by André Popp and lyrics by Pierre Cour. The resulting single reached #33 in the UK Singles Chart in May 1960. At 18 years and 341 days of age at the time of her victory, Boyer was the first teenager to win the contest and the youngest until 1964. Following the death of Lys Assia in 2018, Boyer as of 2026, 66 years after her victory, is the longest surviving winning singer of the Eurovision Song Contest (although not the oldest by age).

== Filmography ==
- The Mystery of the Green Spider (1960)
- Headquarters State Secret (1960)
- Schlager-Raketen
- Gauner-Serenade (1960)
- Der nächste Urlaub kommt bestimmt
- Auf den Flügeln bunter Träume
- Flotte Formen – Kesse Kurven
- So schön wie heut', so müßt' es bleiben

Awards and achievements
Preceded by (Netherlands) Teddy Scholten with "Een beetje"	Winner of the Eurovision Song Contest; 1960	Succeeded by (Luxembourg) Jean-Claude Pascal with "Nous les amoureux"
Preceded by Jean Philippe with "Oui, oui, oui, oui"	France in the Eurovision Song Contest; 1960	Succeeded by Jean-Paul Mauric with "Printemps, avril carillonne"
