= Greetje Kauffeld =

Dutch jazz singer (born 1939)

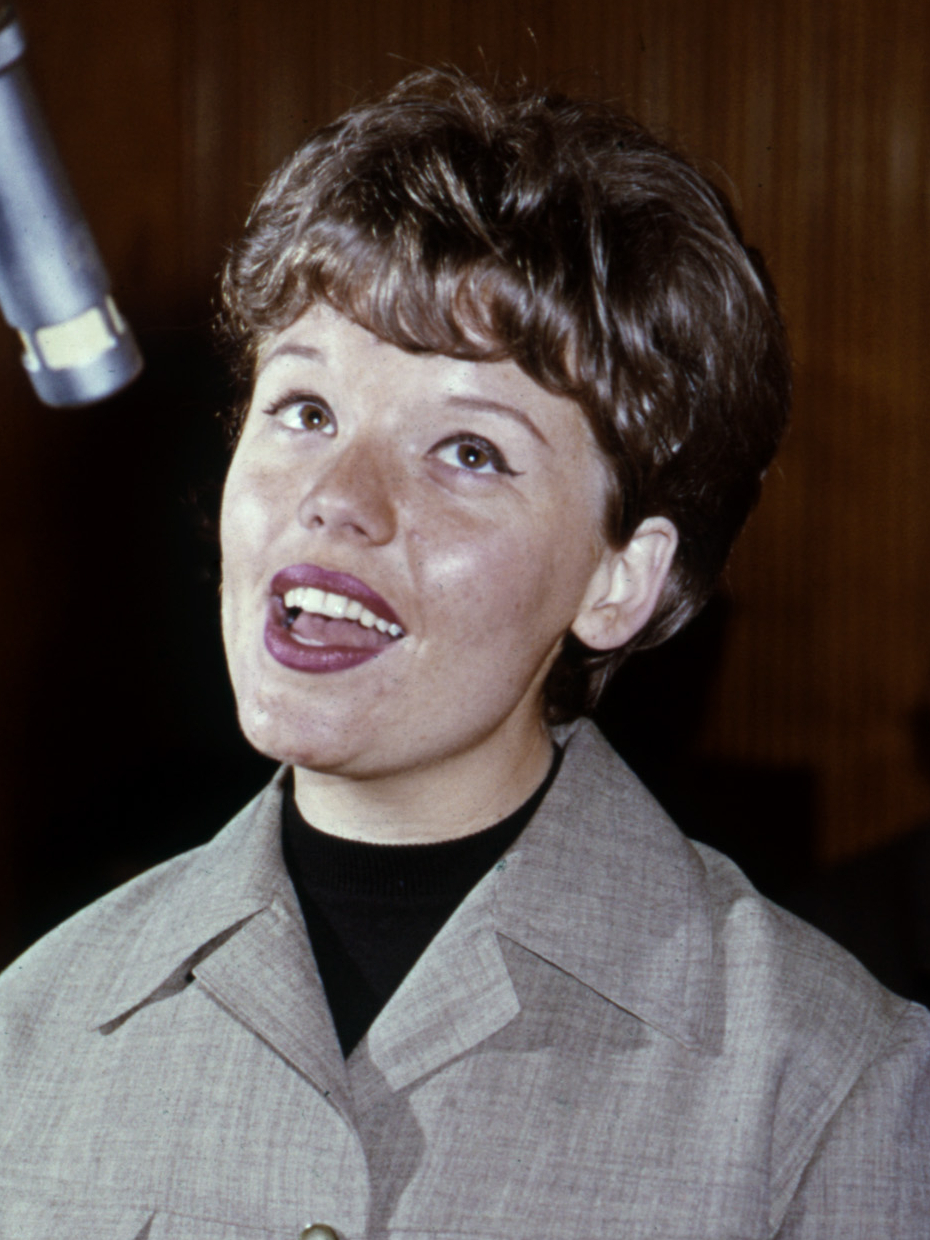
- Kauffeld in 1962

Background information
- Born: Greta Kloet; 26 November 1939 (age 86); Rotterdam, Netherlands
- Genres: Jazz
- Occupation: Singer
- Website: greetjekauffeld.nl

Greta "Greetje" de Roo-Kloet (born 26 November 1939), known professionally as Greetje Kauffeld, is a Dutch jazz singer and schlager musician.

== Biography ==
Greetje Kauffeld was born Greta Kloet on 26 November 1939 in Rotterdam. As a child, she took part in a school choir. At thirteen, she performed with a band in a Radio Hilversum competition. The family later moved to Zeeland. By sixteen, she had become the lead singer of the Skymasters, a Dutch radio orchestra and bigband. Because the orchestra also accompanied artists such as Evelyn Künneke, René Carol, Rudi Schuricke and Fred Bertelmann, she came into contact with many prominent pop stars of the time. At the Festival della canzone in Venice, Erwin Lehn invited the Skymasters to perform at his Südwestrundfunk station in Stuttgart, where he made several recordings with her.

In 1961, Heinz Gietz heard her sing at the Stuttgart Liederhalle and offered her a recording contract. She also appeared in the German television series Game with Fours. Several tracks recorded that year failed to gain traction, though her collaboration with Paul Kuhn produced her most successful early single, "Every Day I Love You a Little Bit More". She also enjoyed success in the Netherlands. In 1961, she represented her country at the Eurovision Song Contest 1961 with "Wat een dag" (transl. "What a Day"), finishing in tenth place. In 1963, she performed "Nur bei dir" (transl. "Only with You") at the German Schlager Festival in Baden-Baden but did not reach the final. Her 1964 release "We Can Only Write Letters" remained in the charts for several weeks.

After her contract ended in 1967, she performed in Los Angeles before returning to Europe. In 1970, she married Joop de Roo, who encouraged her to shift musical direction. She turned to jazz and found success first in the Netherlands and later in Germany. She performed with numerous jazz musicians and recorded a jazz album in 1981. In 1980, she was named Best Soloist at the Euro‑American Nordring radio festival.

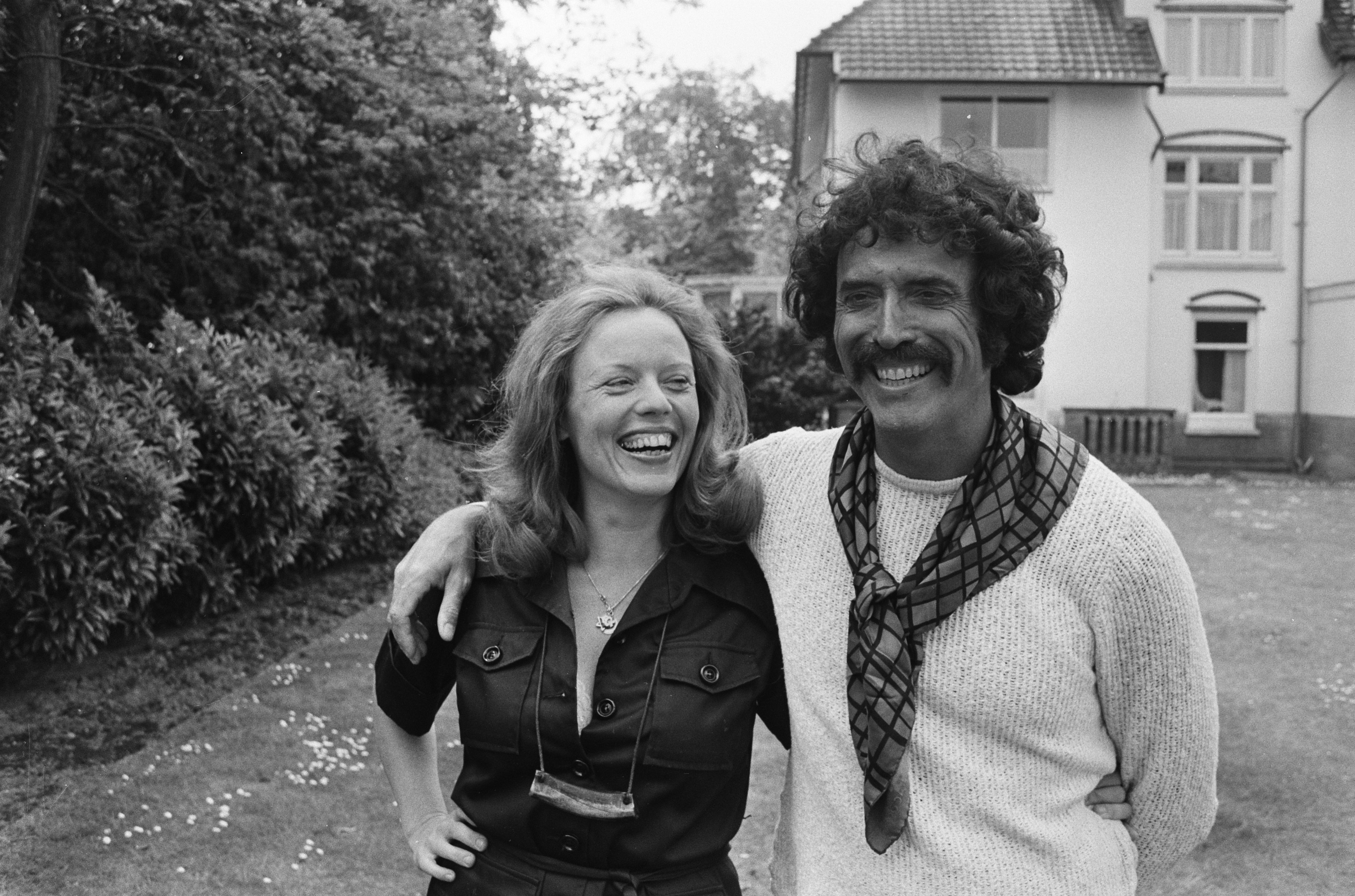
Kauffeld with American jazz singer Mark Murphy in 1975

In 1986, Kauffeld formed her own jazz trio, accompanied by tenor saxophone and guitar. The trio received several awards, including the Gouden Notenkraker and the Jazz Prize of the city of 's-Hertogenbosch. She also became a lecturer at the HKU University of the Arts in Hilversum, where she mentored young jazz musicians, including Pit Witt.

Since 1993, she has performed frequently in Germany, particularly with the Siggi Gerhard-Swingtett, and has appeared as a guest at many concerts. In 2002, she performed with jazz pianist Dirk Raufeisen in the program A Lovely Way to Spend an Evening. In 2005, she began collaborating with the Swingin' Fireballs, resulting in a Christmas album released by Mons Records in 2006.

Her memoir Was für Tage... was published in 2006 by German journalist Ingo Schiweck and updated in 2014 to mark her 75th birthday. Kauffeld was appointed Knight of the Order of the Netherlands Lion in 1999. In November 2014, she received the Edison Jazz Oeuvre Prize, presented by Joke Bruijs on the Dutch television program Tijd voor MAX.

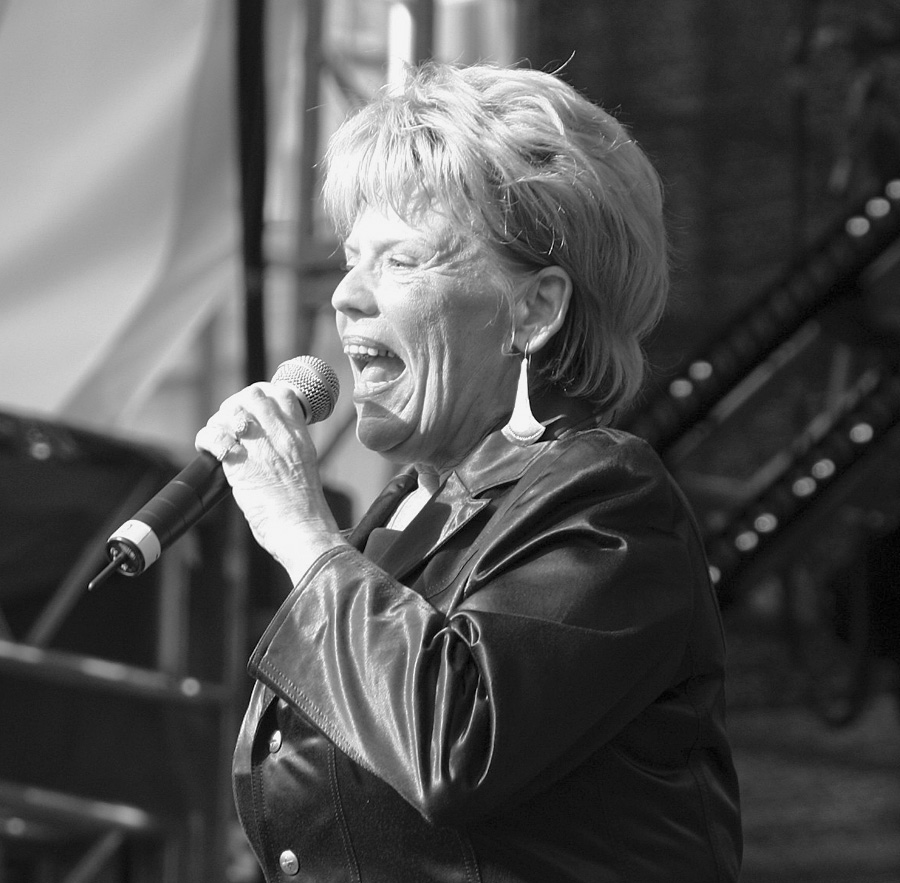
Kauffeld in 2005

== Discography ==
=== Albums ===
- Sunday Melody (1965)
- My Kinda' World (1969)
- And Let the Music Play (1973)
- He Was a King Uncrowned (1976)
- Some Other Spring (1980)
- The Song Is You (1987)
- On My Way to You (1989)
- European Windows (1992)
- Live at the Kölner Philharmonie (1993)
- The Real Thing (1994)
- Jeden Tag da lieb' ich dich ein kleines bisschen mehr (1997)
- Uit liefde en respect voor Gershwin (1997)
- My Favorite Ballads (1998)
- On the Sunny Side of Swing (1998)
- Dreaming (2000)
- Devil May Care (2002)
- My Shining Hour (2005)
- Tender Meditation (2008)
- Heaven's Open (2011)
- Young Girl Sunday Jazz (2015)

Awards and achievements
Preceded by Rudi Carrell with "Wat een geluk"	Netherlands in the Eurovision Song Contest; 1961	Succeeded by De Spelbrekers with "Katinka"
