= Dario Campeotto =

Danish singer, actor, and entertainer (1939–2023)

- Born: 1 February 1939; Frederiksberg, Copenhagen, Denmark
- Died: 1 April 2023 (aged 84)
- Occupations: singer; actor; entertainer
- Instrument: vocals
- Labels: Sony Music
- Spouse: Ghita Nørby (m. 1963; div. 1969)

Dario Carlo Giacomo Campeotto (1 February 1939 – 1 April 2023) was a Danish singer, actor, and entertainer.

== Early life and career ==
Campeotto was born in Frederiksberg, Copenhagen on 1 February 1939, to Italian parents, Emma and Ernesto Campeotto.

Campeotto started performing at the age of ten, but his breakthrough was a victory in the Dansk Melodi Grand Prix in 1961 with the song "Angelique", which went on to finish fifth in the Eurovision Song Contest 1961. Following "Angelique", Dario Campeotto released a number of records, starred in theatrical play, operettas, revues, and movies.

== Personal life and death ==
Dario Campeotto was married twice. He lived in Italy with his first wife, actress Ghita Nørby, but returned to Denmark, where he continued his career. He had three children.

Campeotto died on 1 April 2023, at the age of 84.

== Discography ==
=== Album ===
| Year | Album | Peak positions |
| Year | Album | DEN |
|---|---|---|
| 2014 | Mit skønne Italien | 12 |

=== Singles ===
| Year | Album | Peak positions |
| Year | Album | NOR |
|---|---|---|
| 1961 | "Angelique" | 9 |

== Filmography ==
- 1960: Eventyrrejsen
- 1961: Peters baby
- 1962: Han, hun, Dirch og Dario
- 1966: Flagermusen
- 1967: Nyhavns glade gutter
- 2001: Flyvende farmor

| Preceded by Katy Bødtger with "Det var en yndig tid" | Denmark in the Eurovision Song Contest; 1961 with "Angelique" | Succeeded by Ellen Winther with "Vuggevise" |
