= Brita Koivunen =

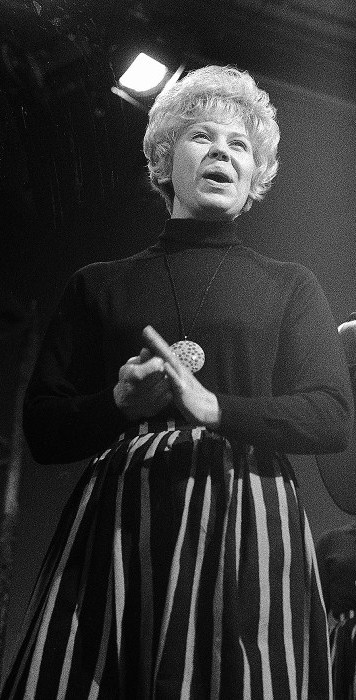
- Koivunen in 1965

Background information
- Born: 31 August 1931; Helenski, Finland
- Died: 12 April 2014 (aged 82) Helenski, Finland
- Occupation: Singer

Brita Koivunen (married name: Brita Koivunen-Einiö; 31 August 1931 – 12 April 2014) was a Finnish schlager singer. Some of her most famous songs include "Suklaasydän", "Sävel rakkauden" and "Mamma, tuo mies minua tuijottaa", a Finnish version of "Ma! (He's Making Eyes at Me)", all from the 1950s. She was born and died in Helsinki.

During her career, Koivunen sold 100,000 certified records, placing her among the top 50 best-selling female soloists in Finland.

== Last years ==
During the late 1990s, Koivunen still performed in trio with Pirkko Mannola and Vieno Kekkonen. She retired in 2005 and was replaced by Marjatta Leppänen. In 2006, she was widowed following the death of her husband of more than 50 years, music producer Paavo Einiö. Koivunen-Einiö died on 12 April 2014 from natural causes at the age of 82.
