= Laila Kinnunen =

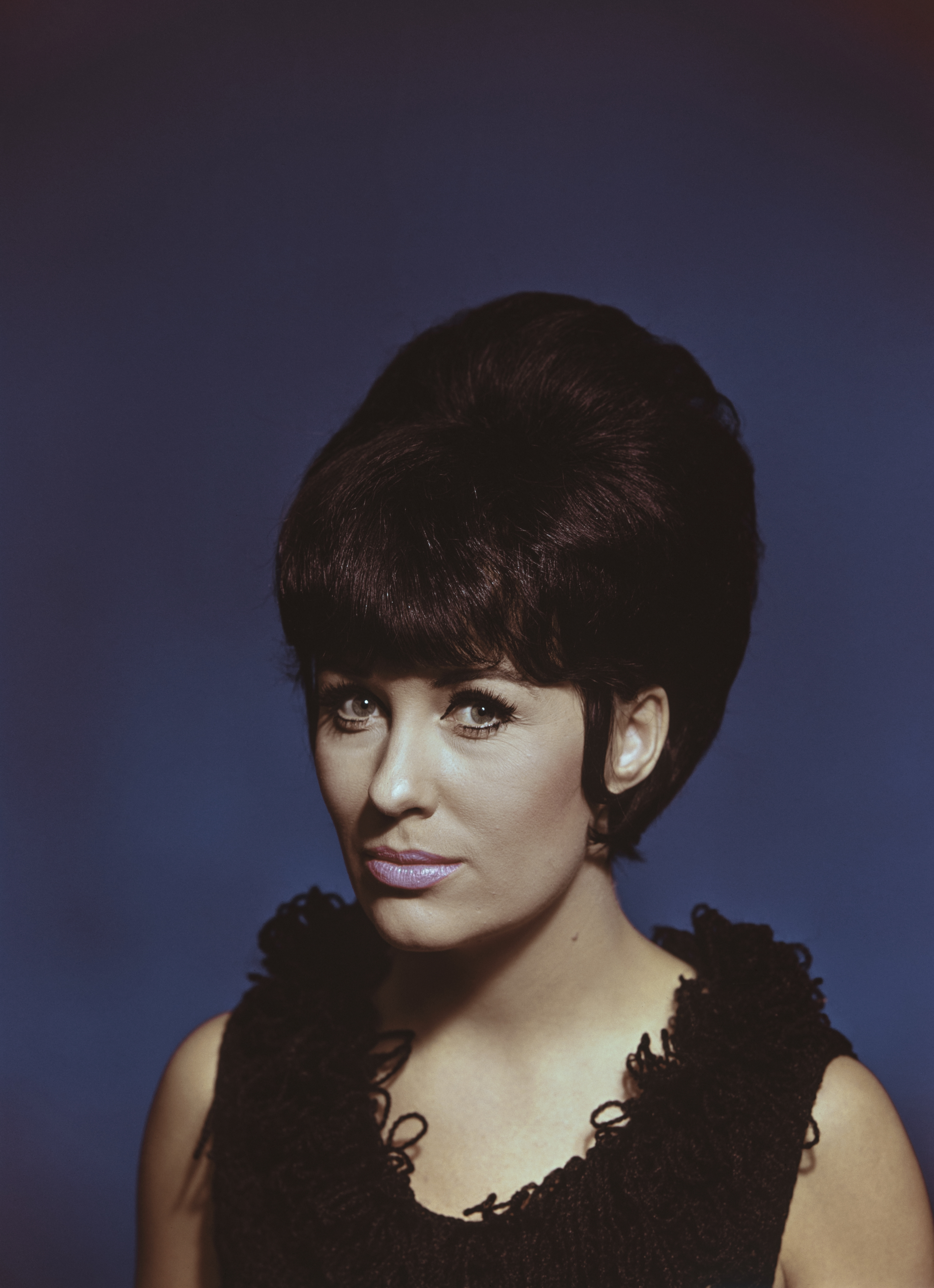
- Laila Kinnunen in 1965.

Background information
- Born: 8 November 1939; Vantaa, Finland
- Died: 26 October 2000 (aged 60) Heinävesi, Finland
- Occupation: Singer

Laura “Laila” Annikki Kinnunen (8 November 1939 – 26 October 2000) was a Finnish singer. She was one of the most popular Finnish singers of the 1950s and 1960s, and represented Finland at the Eurovision Song Contest 1961, the first time Finland participated in the contest.

Born in Vantaa, Finland, she spent her childhood in Sweden as a refugee from the Second World War, returning to Finland at the age of ten. Her first album, released in 1957, was a success, and she continued to release music until 1980. From the 1970s she suffered from severe alcoholism.

Her daughter is Finnish singer Milana Mišić.

She died on 26 October 2000 in Heinävesi at the age of 60 after slipping and breaking her neck on a stair step while taking her dog out for a walk.

== Albums ==
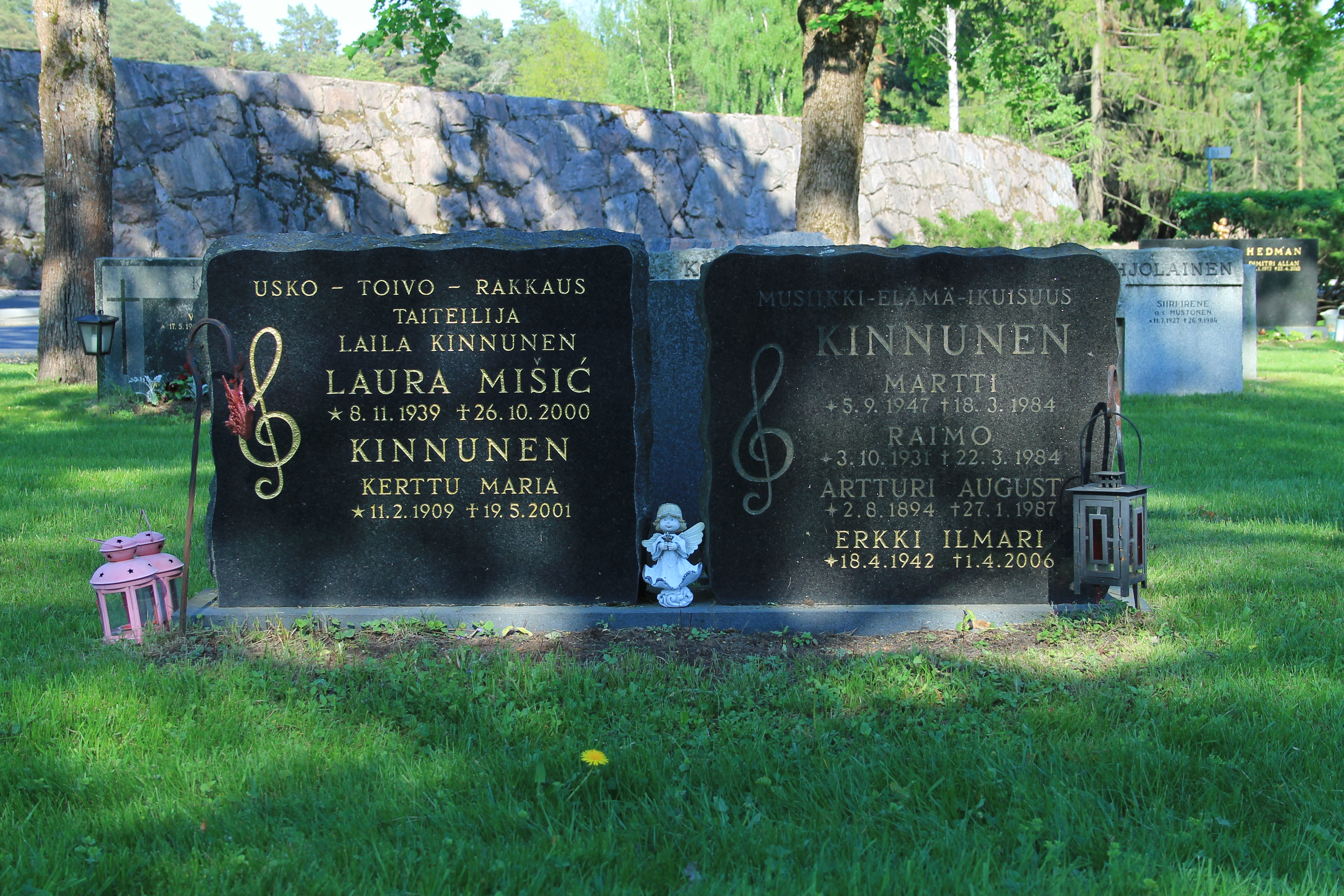
Laila Kinnusen's family grave in Malmi Cemetery

- Laila (1965, Scandia)
- Iskelmiä vuosien varrelta (1974, Scandia)
- Ajaton Laila Kinnunen (1974, Scandia)
- Sävelkansio (1980, Helmi)
- Valoa ikkunassa (1986, Helmi)
- 32 ikivihreää (1989, Safir)
- 24 ikivihreää (1989, Finnlevy)
- Mandschurian kummut (1989, Basebeat)
- Unohtumattomat (1992, Helmi)
- Parhaat (1994, Valitut Palat)
- 20 suosikkia – Lazzarella (1996, F Records)
- 20 suosikkia – Valoa ikkunassa (1996, F Records)
- 20 suosikkia – Mandshurian kummut (1997, F Records)
- 20 suosikkia – Idän ja lännen tiet (1997, F Records)
- Muistojen Laila (1999, F Records)
- Kaikki kauneimmat (2000, F Records)
- Muistojen kyyneleet: 20 ennen julkaisematonta laulua (2001, Mediamusiikki)
- Kadonneet helmet: 20 ennenjulkaisematonta laulua (2002, Mediamusiikki)
- Kadonneet helmet 2: 20 ennenjulkaisematonta laulua (2004, Mediamusiikki)
- 30 suosikkia (2007, Warner Music)
- A la Laila: Alkuperäiset levytykset 1957-1980 (2009, Warner Music)

== See also ==
- Annikki Tähti

Preceded by none	Finland in the Eurovision Song Contest; 1961	Succeeded by Marion Rung with Tipi-tii
