= Nous les amoureux =

1961 song by Jean-Claude Pascal

Single by Jean-Claude Pascal
- Language: French
- Released: 1961
- Label: La Voix de son maître
- Composer: Jacques Datin
- Lyricist: Maurice Vidalin

Eurovision Song Contest 1961 entry
- Country: Luxembourg
- Artist: Chevalier de Villemont
- As: Jean-Claude Pascal
- Language: French
- Composer: Jacques Datin
- Lyricist: Maurice Vidalin
- Conductor: Léo Chauliac

Finals performance
- Final result: 1st
- Final points: 31

Entry chronology
- ◄ "So laang we's du do bast" (1960)
- "Petit bonhomme" (1962) ►

Official performance video
- "Nous les amoureux" on YouTube

"Nous les amoureux" (French pronunciation: [nu lez‿amuʁø]; "We, the Lovers" or "Us Lovers") is a song recorded by French singer Jean-Claude Pascal with music composed by Jacques Datin and French lyrics written by Maurice Vidalin. It represented Luxembourg in the Eurovision Song Contest 1961 held in Cannes, resulting in the country's first ever win at the contest.

== Background ==
=== Conception ===
"Nous les amoureux" was composed by Jacques Datin with French lyrics by Maurice Vidalin (1924–1986) and was recorded by Jean-Claude Pascal. In addition to the French original version, he also recorded the song in German and Italian.

The song tells the story of a thwarted love between the singer and his lover ("they would like to separate us, they would like to hinder us / from being happy"). The lyrics go on about how the relationship is rejected by others but will finally be possible ("but the time will come. [...] and I will be able to love you without anybody in town talking about it. [...] [God] gave us the right to happiness and joy."). Pascal later claimed that the song was about a homosexual relationship and the difficulties it faced.

=== Eurovision ===
The Compagnie Luxembourgeoise de Télédiffusion (CLT) internally selected the song as its entrant for the 6th edition of the Eurovision Song Contest.

On 18 March 1961, the Eurovision Song Contest was held at the Palais des Festivals et des Congrès of Cannes hosted by the Radiodiffusion-Télévision Française (RTF), and broadcast live throughout the continent. Pascal performed "Nous les amoureux" fourteenth on the evening, following Denmark's "Angelique" by Dario Campeotto and preceding the United Kingdom's "Are You Sure?" by The Allisons. Léo Chauliac conducted the event's live orchestra in the performance of the Luxembourgian entry.

By the close of voting, it had received 31 points, placing it first in a field of sixteen and thus helping Luxembourg to achieve the rare feat of moving from last to first in successive years. The song was succeeded as contest winner in 1962 by "Un premier amour" by Isabelle Aubret for France. It was succeeded as Luxembourgian representative that year by "Petit bonhomme" by Camillo Felgen.

Due to the contest overrunning in time, the reprise of this song was not shown in the United Kingdom, as the BBC's coverage ended shortly after the voting had finished and the winning song was declared.

=== Aftermath ===
Pascal performed his song in the Eurovision twenty-fifth anniversary show Songs of Europe held on 22 August 1981 in Mysen.

== Legacy ==
The song was also featured on Season 2, Episode 6 of A Very Secret Service.

| Preceded by "Tom Pillibi" by Jacqueline Boyer | Eurovision Song Contest winners 1961 | Succeeded by "Un premier amour" by Isabelle Aubret |
