= Sanremo Music Festival 1962 =

Italian song contest (12th edition)

Dates and venue
- Semi-final 1: 8 February 1962
- Semi-final 2: 9 February 1962
- Semi-final 3: 10 February 1962
- Final: 18 February 1962
- Venue: Sanremo Casino; Sanremo, Italy

Organisation
- Broadcaster: Radiotelevisione italiana (RAI)
- Artistic director: Gianni Ravera
- Presenters: Renato Tagliani and Laura Efrikian, Vicky Ludovisi

Vote
- Number of entries: 32
- Winner: "Addio, addio" Domenico Modugno and Claudio Villa

The Sanremo Music Festival 1962 (Italian: Festival di Sanremo 1962), officially the 12th Italian Song Festival (12º Festival della canzone italiana), was the 12th annual Sanremo Music Festival, held at the Sanremo Casino in Sanremo between 8 and 18 February 1962, and broadcast by Radiotelevisione italiana (RAI). The show was presented by Renato Tagliani, assisted by actresses Laura Efrikian and Vicky Ludovisi. Gianni Ravera served as artistic director.

According to the rules of this edition every song was performed in a double performance by a couple of singers or groups. The winners of the Festival were Domenico Modugno and Claudio Villa with the song "Addio, addio". Villa went on to perform the song for Italy at the Eurovision Song Contest 1962.

== Participants and results ==
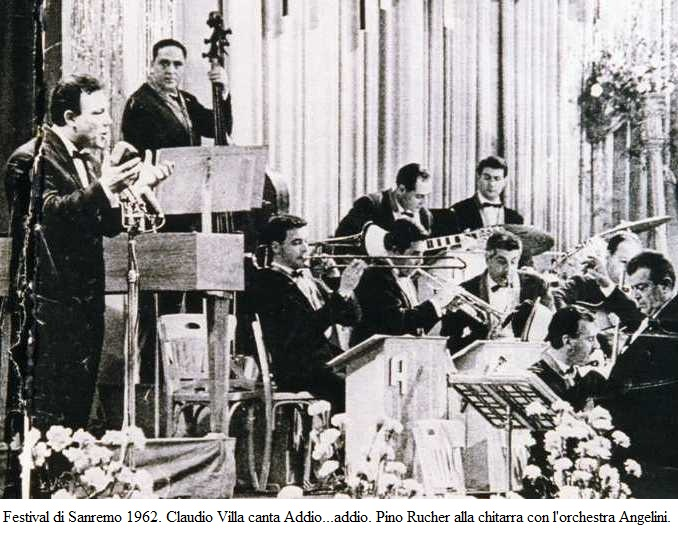
Claudio Villa performing the winning entry "Addio, addio"

Participants and results
Song	Artist(s)		Songwriter(s)	Rank
"Addio, addio"	Domenico Modugno	Claudio Villa	Franco Migliacci; Domenico Modugno	1
"Tango italiano"	Sergio Bruni	Milva	Bruno Pallesi; Walter Malgoni	2
"Gondolì gondolà"	Sergio Bruni	Ernesto Bonino	Nisa; Renato Carosone	3
"Quando quando quando"	Tony Renis	Emilio Pericoli	Alberto Testa; Tony Renis	4
"Stanotte al luna park"	Milva	Miriam Del Mare	Vito Pallavicini; Biri; Carlo Alberto Rossi	5
"Lui andava a cavallo"	Gino Bramieri	Aurelio Fierro	Nicola Salerno; Nino Ravasini	6
"Un'anima leggera"	Arturo Testa	Jolanda Rossin	Piero Rolla; Federico Bergamini	7
"Cipria di sole"	Joe Sentieri	Aurelio Fierro	Giuseppe Marotta; Salvatore Mazzocco	8
"Aspettandoti"	Tonina Torrielli	Nelly Fioramonti	Saverio Seracini; Vincenzo D'Acquisto	9
"Buongiorno amore"	Johnny Dorelli	Betty Curtis	Mario Panzeri; Johnny Dorelli	10
"Passa il tempo"	Flo Sandon's	Mario D'Alba	Sandro Taccani; Umberto Bertini	11
"Inventiamo la vita"	Nunzio Gallo	Rocco Montana	Vittorio Mascheroni; Gian Carlo Testoni	12
"Centomila volte"	Arturo Testa	Jolanda Rossin	Sergio Censi; De Bernardi	Eliminated
"Conta le stelle"	Silvia Guidi	Jenny Luna	Enzo Di Paola; Umberto Bertini	Eliminated
"Cose inutili"	Fausto Cigliano	Jenny Luna	Gianni Meccia; Ugo Tognazzi	Eliminated
"Due cipressi"	Rossana	Gian Costello	Pietro Pizzigoni; Angelo Camis; Gian Carlo Testoni	Eliminated
"Fiori sull'acqua"	Wanda Romanelli	Nelly Fioramonti	Gianni Fallabrino; Vincenzo D'Acquisto	Eliminated
"I colori della felicità"	Wilma De Angelis	Tanya	Leda Ranzato; Eros Sciorilli	Eliminated
"Il cielo cammina"	Luciano Tajoli	Betty Curtis	Mario Ruccione; Umberto Bertini; Pino Tombolato	Eliminated
"Il nostro amore"	Gesy Sebena	Giacomo Rondinella	Pinchi; Virgilio Panzuti	Eliminated
"Innamorati"	Gene Colonnello	Gloria Christian	Giovanni D'Anzi; Mario Panzeri	Eliminated
"L'anellino"	Corrado Lojacono	Luciano Tajoli	Corrado Lojacono; Nicola Salerno	Eliminated
"L'ombrellone"	Johnny Dorelli	Gloria Christian	Pino Calvi; Leo Chiosso	Eliminated
"L'ultimo pezzo di terra"	Nunzio Gallo	Bruna Lelli	Marcello Zanfagna; Gino Conte; Nunzio Gallo; Agostino Forte	Eliminated
"Lumicini rossi"	Wilma De Angelis	Lucia Altieri	Fabor; Gian Carlo Testoni	Eliminated
"Occhi senza lacrime"	Pierfilippi	Cocky Mazzetti	Eros Macchi; A. Grettici	Eliminated
"Pesca tu che pesco anch'io"	Gino Bramieri	Rocco Torrebruno	Eldo Di Lazzaro; Bixio Cherubini	Eliminated
"Prima del paradiso"	Flo Sandon's	Edda Montanari	Riccardo Vantellini; Pinchi	Eliminated
"Quando il vento d'aprile"	Aura D'Angelo	Claudio Villa	Salvatore Palomba; Antonio Vian	Eliminated
"Tobia"	Cocky Mazzetti	Joe Sentieri	Carlo Donida; Mogol; Alberto Testa	Eliminated
"Vestita di rosso"	Mario Abbate	Fausto Cigliano	Alberto Testa; Rinaldo Cozzoli; Giulio Compare	Eliminated
"Vita"	Narciso Parigi	Giorgio Consolini	Bixio Cherubini; Carlo Concina	Eliminated

== Broadcasts ==
=== Local broadcast ===
The final was broadcast on television in Italy to an estimated 13.2 million viewers.

=== International broadcasts ===
Known details on the broadcasts in each country, including the specific broadcasting stations and commentators are shown in the tables below.

International broadcasters of the Sanremo Music Festival 1962
Country	Broadcaster	Channel(s)	Commentator(s)	Ref(s)
Monaco	Radio Monte Carlo (Note: Delayed broadcast on the following day at 16:02 (CET))			
United States	WPIX (Note: Delayed broadcast with the first part broadcast on 28 April at 12:30 (EDT), and the second part broadcast on 5 May at 12:30 (EDT).)			
