= Sanremo Music Festival 1961 =

Italian song contest (11th edition)

Dates and venue
- Semi-final 1: 26 January 1961
- Semi-final 2: 27 January 1961
- Semi-final 3: 28 January 1961
- Final: 6 February 1961
- Venue: Sanremo Casino; Sanremo, Italy

Organisation
- Broadcaster: Radiotelevisione italiana (RAI)
- Presenters: Lilli Lembo; Giuliana Calandra; Alberto Lionello

Vote
- Number of entries: 24
- Winner: "Al di là" Luciano Tajoli and Betty Curtis

The Sanremo Music Festival 1961 (Italian: Festival di Sanremo 1961), officially the 11th Italian Song Festival (11º Festival della canzone italiana), was the eleventh annual Sanremo Music Festival, held at the Sanremo Casino in Sanremo between 26 January and 6 February 1961, and broadcast by Radiotelevisione italiana (RAI). The show was presented by Lilli Lembo and Giuliana Calandra for the first three nights, while Alberto Lionello replaced Calandra in the final night. Ezio Radaelli served as artistic director.

According to the rules of this edition every song was performed in a double performance by a couple of singers or groups. The winners of the festival were Luciano Tajoli and Betty Curtis with the song "Al di là". Curtis went on to perform the song for Italy at the Eurovision Song Contest 1961.

== Participants and results ==
Participants and results
Song	Artist(s)		Songwriter(s)	Rank
"Al di là"	Luciano Tajoli	Betty Curtis	Mogol; Carlo Donida	1
"24.000 baci"	Little Tony	Adriano Celentano	Piero Vivarelli; Lucio Fulci; Adriano Celentano	2
"Il mare nel cassetto"	Gino Latilla	Milva	Piero Carlo Rolla; Eligio La Valle; Fernando Lattuada	3
"Io amo tu ami"	Mina	Nelly Fioramonti	Gino Redi; Enzo Bonagura	4
"Le mille bolle blu"	Jenny Luna	Mina	Vito Pallavicini; Carlo Alberto Rossi	5
"Come sinfonia"	Pino Donaggio	Teddy Reno	Pino Donaggio	6
"Febbre di musica"	Arturo Testa	Tonina Torrielli	Biri; Vittorio Mascheroni	7
"Mandolino… mandolino"	Sergio Bruni	Teddy Reno	Vian; Pugliese	8
"Carolina, dai!"	Rocco Granata	Sergio Bruni	Daniele Pace; Mario Panzeri	9
"Un uomo vivo"	Gino Paoli	Tony Dallara	Gino Paoli	10
"Non mi dire chi sei"	Miranda Martino	Umberto Bindi	Giorgio Calabrese; Umberto Bindi	11
"Lei"	Fausto Cigliano	Joe Sentieri	Riccardo Pazzaglia; Joe Sentieri	12
"A.A.A. Adorabile cercasi"	Bruno Martino	Jula de Palma	Bruno Martino; Brighetti; Vito Pallavicini	Eliminated
"Benzina e cerini"	Giorgio Gaber	Maria Monti	Giorgio Gaber	Eliminated
"Che freddo!"	Edoardo Vianello	Luciano Rondinella	Carlo Rossi; Edoardo Vianello	Eliminated
"Una goccia di cielo"	Jolanda Rossin	Nadia Liani	Gino Negri	Eliminated
"Lady Luna"	Jimmy Fontana	Miranda Martino	Dino Verde; Armando Trovajoli	Eliminated
"Libellule"	Betty Curtis	Joe Sentieri	Alberto Testa; Guido Viezzoli	Eliminated
"Mare di dicembre"	Claudio Villa	Sergio Renda	Luciano Beretta; Giulio Libano	Eliminated
"Notturno senza luna"	Aura D'Angelo	Silvia Guidi	Giovanni D'Anzi	Eliminated
"Patatina"	Gianni Meccia	Wilma De Angelis	Gianni Meccia; Franco Migliacci	Eliminated
"Pozzanghere"	Niki Davis	Tony Renis	Orfellius; Lamberto Pellini; Tony Renis; Matteo Treppiedi	Eliminated
"Qualcuno mi ama"	Achille Togliani	Cocky Mazzetti	Piero Soffici; Manlio Darena	Eliminated
"Tu con me"	Aurelio Fierro	Carla Boni	Antonio Amurri; Ettore Ballotta	Eliminated

== Broadcasts ==
=== Local broadcast ===
All shows were broadcast on Italian Television and Secondo Programma, beginning at 22:00 CET (21:00 UTC).

=== International broadcast ===
Known details on the broadcasts in each country, including the specific broadcasting stations and commentators are shown in the tables below.

International broadcasters of the Sanremo Music Festival 1961
Country	Broadcaster	Channel(s)	Commentator(s)	Ref(s)
France	RTF	RTF (Note: Delayed broadcast at 12 February at 22:35 (CEST))		
Switzerland	SRG SSR	TV DRS (Note: Delayed broadcast on semi-final 3 the following day at 21:00 (CEST))		
Switzerland	SRG SSR	TSR (Note: Delayed broadcast on semi-final 3 at 12 February at 20:35 (CEST))	Denis Michel	
Switzerland	SRG SSR	RSI (Note: Delayed broadcast on the 15 February at 22:35 (CET))		
Turkey	İstanbul Radyosu (Note: Delayed broadcast in a shortened format on 5 May at 10:00 (EEST))			
United States	WOL (Note: Delayed broadcast in a shortened format on 19 February at 12:35 (EDT))			
