= Connie Francis Sings Modern Italian Hits =

Studio album by Connie Francis
- Released: January 1963
- Recorded: November 9, 1961; October 1, 1962; October 4–5, 1962; November 3, 1962
- Genre: Pop
- Label: MGM
- Producer: Danny Davis

Connie Francis chronology
Country Music – Connie Style (1962)	Connie Francis Sings Modern Italian Hits (1963)	Connie Francis Sings Award Winning Motion Picture Hits (1963)

Singles from Connie Francis Sings Modern Italian Hits
- 1. ""Al di là"" Released: December 1962

Connie Francis Sings Modern Italian Hits is a studio album recorded by American entertainer Connie Francis.

== Background ==
The album featured cover versions of contemporary Italian hits previously recorded by other artists between 1958 and 1962, several of them being entries to the renowned Sanremo Festival. Winning songs of the festival were also Italy's contributions to the Eurovision Song Contest during the respective years.

Most of the album's featured songs were recorded by Francis bilingually in English/Italian. Only "Addio, addio", "Nun è peccato", and "24 Mila Baci""Ventiquattromila baci" were recorded entirely in Italian.

The album's twelve tracks were chosen from a total of twenty-four finished recordings cut between November 9, 1961 and November 3, 1962. Arrangements were provided by Cliff Parman, Giulio Libano and LeRoy Holmes.

All three versions of the opening track, "Al di là" (for further details see below), were released either as a single or Extended Play (EP). Although the bilingual Italian/English version only peaked at No. 90 in the United States, "Al di là" became Francis's most successful Italian single recording internationally, peaking at No. 1 in several countries.

== Chart performance ==
The album debuted on Billboard magazine's Top LP's chart in the issue dated February 16, 1963, peaking at No. 103 during a five-week run on the chart. The album debuted on Cashbox magazine's Top 100 Albums chart in the issue dated January 26, 1963, and was ranked much higher by the magazine, peaking at No. 43 during a ten-week run on the chart.

== Track listing ==
=== Side A ===
#	Title	Songwriter	Length	Remark
1.	"Al di là"	Carlo Donida, Mogol English lyrics by Connie Francis differ from those by Ervin Drake on other recordings of this song	3.17	• Third version, recorded blingual Italian/English • Original recordings by Betty Curtis and Luciano Tajoli • Sanremo Festival 1961: # 1 • Eurovision Song Contest 1961: # 5
2.	"Il cielo in una stanza"	Gino Paoli, Mogol	3.12	• Original recording by Mina (1959)
3.	"Quando, quando, quando"	Tony Renis, Alberto Testa, Pat Boone	2.24	• Original recordings by Tony Renis and Emilio Pericoli • Sanremo Festival 1962: # 4
4.	"Nessuno al mondo"	Art Crafer, Jimmy Nebb, Nino Rastrelli	3.31	• Second version, recorded bilingual Italian/English • Original recording by Peppino di Capri (1960)
5.	"Arrivederci"	Umberto Bindi, Giorgio Calabrese	3.05	• Second Version with new narrative • Original recording by Franco Franchi (1959)
6.	"Tango Italiano"	Bruno Pallesi, Walter Mangoli	2.57	• Original recordings by Milva and Sergio Bruni • Sanremo Festival 1962: # 2

=== Side B ===
#	Title	Songwriter	Length	Remark
1.	"Come Sinfonia"	Pino Donaggio	2.44	• Second version with English narrative overdub • Original recording by Pino Donaggio (1961)
2.	"Nun è peccato"	Ugo Calise, Carlo Alberto Rossi, Silvano Birga	3.11	• Original recording by Peppino di Capri (1960)
3.	"Romantica"	Dino Verde, Renato Rascel	3.09	• Original recordings by Renato Rascel and Tony Dallara • Sanremo Festival 1960: # 1 • Eurovision Song Contest 1960: # 8
4.	"Ventiquattro mila baci (24,000 baci)"	Adriano Celentano	1.58	• Original recordings by Adriano Celentano and Little Tony • Sanremo Festival 1961: # 2
5.	"Come prima"	Mario Panzeri, Vincenzo di Paola, Sandro Taccani	2.30	• Original recording by Tony Dallara (1958)
6.	"Addio, addio"	Domenico Modugno, Franco Migliacci	3.47	• Third version • Original recordings by Claudio Villa and Domenico Modugno • Sanremo Festival 1962: # 1 • Eurovision Song Contest 1962: # 15

=== Not included songs from the sessions ===
#	Title	Songwriter	Length	Remark
1.	"Addio, addio"	Domenico Modugno, Franco Migliacci	unknown	• First version, unreleased to this day
2.	"Addio, addio"	Domenico Modugno, Franco Migliacci	unknown	• Second version, unreleased to this day
3.	"Al di là"	Carlo Donida, Mogol	3.29	• First version, recorded in pure Italian • Released in Mexico on MGM Records Extended Play EXPL 1034
4.	"Al di là"	Carlo Donida, Mogol	3.46	• Second version, recorded in pure Italian • Released in Spain on MGM Records Extended Play 63-025
5.	"Arrivederci"	Umberto Bindi, Giorgio Calabrese	unknown	• First version, unreleased to this day
6.	"Come Sinfonia"	Pino Donaggio	2.44	• First version, Italian vocals only, unreleased to this day
7.	"Luna Caprese"	Augusto Cesareo, Luigi Riccardi	2.56	• Released in Italy on MGM Records Single K 2040
8.	"Munasterio 'e Santa Chiara"	traditional	3.45	• Unreleased until 1978 on LP 'Connie, Italiano' (Laurie House LH8019)
9.	"Nessuno al mondo"	Art Crafer, Jimmy Nebb, Nino Rastrelli	3.33	• First version, recorded in pure Italian, unreleased to this day
10.	"Un bacio all'italiana"	Christian Bruhn, Georg Buschor, Luciano Beretta	1.58	• Released in Italy on MGM Records Single • Original German recording "Zwei kleine Italiener" and first Italian cover version by Conny Froboess (1962) • Eurovision Song Contest 1962: # 6 (German version)
11.	"Un violino nel mio cuore"	Sacha Richepin, Giovanni Rastelli	3.13	• Released in Italy on MGM Records Single K 2056 • Original recording by Luis Mariano
12.	"Violino tzigano"	Cesare Andrea Bixio, Bixio Cherubini	2.37	• Released in Germany on MGM Records Single 61 066 • Original recording by Joselito

NOTE: During the 1960s, entries to the Sanremo Festival were usually presented by two different artists using individual orchestral arrangements to emphasize the status of the festival as a composers' and not a vocalists' competition. Therefore, the Sanremo entries in these listings name two Italian artists for the recording of the original version.

== Charts ==
Chart (1963)	Peak position
US Billboard Top LPs (Monoraul)	103
US Cashbox Top 100 Albums (Monoraul)	43
