= 20 successi di Mina =

Compilation album by Mina
- Released: 1964
- Length: 49:30
- Label: Italdisc

Mina chronology
Stessa spiaggia, stesso mare (1963)	20 successi di Mina (1964)	Mina (1964)

20 successi di Mina is a compilation album by Italian singer Mina, issued in 1964.

The songs of this album were all taken from the first six albums published between 1960 and 1963, except "Vulcano" that was published in 1963 only on a 45 rpm record.

== Track listing ==
=== Side A ===
No.	Title	Writer(s)	Length
1.	"Il cielo in una stanza"	Toang (Renato Angiolini), Mogol	2:54
2.	"Renato (Renata)"	Alberto Cortez, Alberto Testa	2:12
3.	"Due note"	Antonio Amurri, Bruno Canfora, Faele (Raffaele Sposito)	2:55
4.	"Tintarella di luna"	Franco Migliacci, Bruno De Filippi	2:57
5.	"Champagne twist"	Bruno Canfora, Dino Verde	2:32
6.	"Una zebra a pois"	Lelio Luttazzi, Dino Verde, Marcello Ciorciolini	2:09
7.	"Stringimi forte i polsi"	Leo Chiosso, Dario Fo, Gigi Cichellero, Fiorenzo Carpi	2:34
8.	"Vola vola da me"	Vittorio Buffoli, Alberto Testa	2:18
9.	"Moliendo café"	Hugo Blanco	2:59
10.	"Mi guardano"	Roxy Rob (Leo Chiosso), Umberto Prous	2:44
Total length:			26:14

=== Side B ===
No.	Title	Writer(s)	Length
1.	"Stessa spiaggia, stesso mare"	Mogol, Piero Soffici	2:11
2.	"È vero"	Nisa (Nicola Salerno), Umberto Bindi	2:06
3.	"Folle banderuola"	Gianni Meccia	2:20
4.	"Tu sei mio"	Roxy Rob (Leo Chiosso), Umberto Prous	2:16
5.	"Non piangerò (Just Let Me Cry)"	Mark Barkan, Ben Raleigh, Leo Chiosso	2:20
6.	"Vulcano"	Mogol, Miki Del Prete, Pino Massara	2:26
7.	"A volte (Pretend That I'm Her)"	Norman Blagman, Sam Bobrick, Roxy Rob (Leo Chiosso)	2:22
8.	"La ragazza dell'ombrellone accanto"	Vittorio Buffoli, Vito Pallavicini	2:25
9.	"Chihuahua"	Giorgio Calabrese, Antonio Bertocchi, Mansueto De Ponti	2:12
10.	"Sabato notte"	Bruno Canfora, Dino Verde	2:38
Total length:			23:16
