= Aura D'Angelo =

Aura D'Angelo Anna Cantalupo
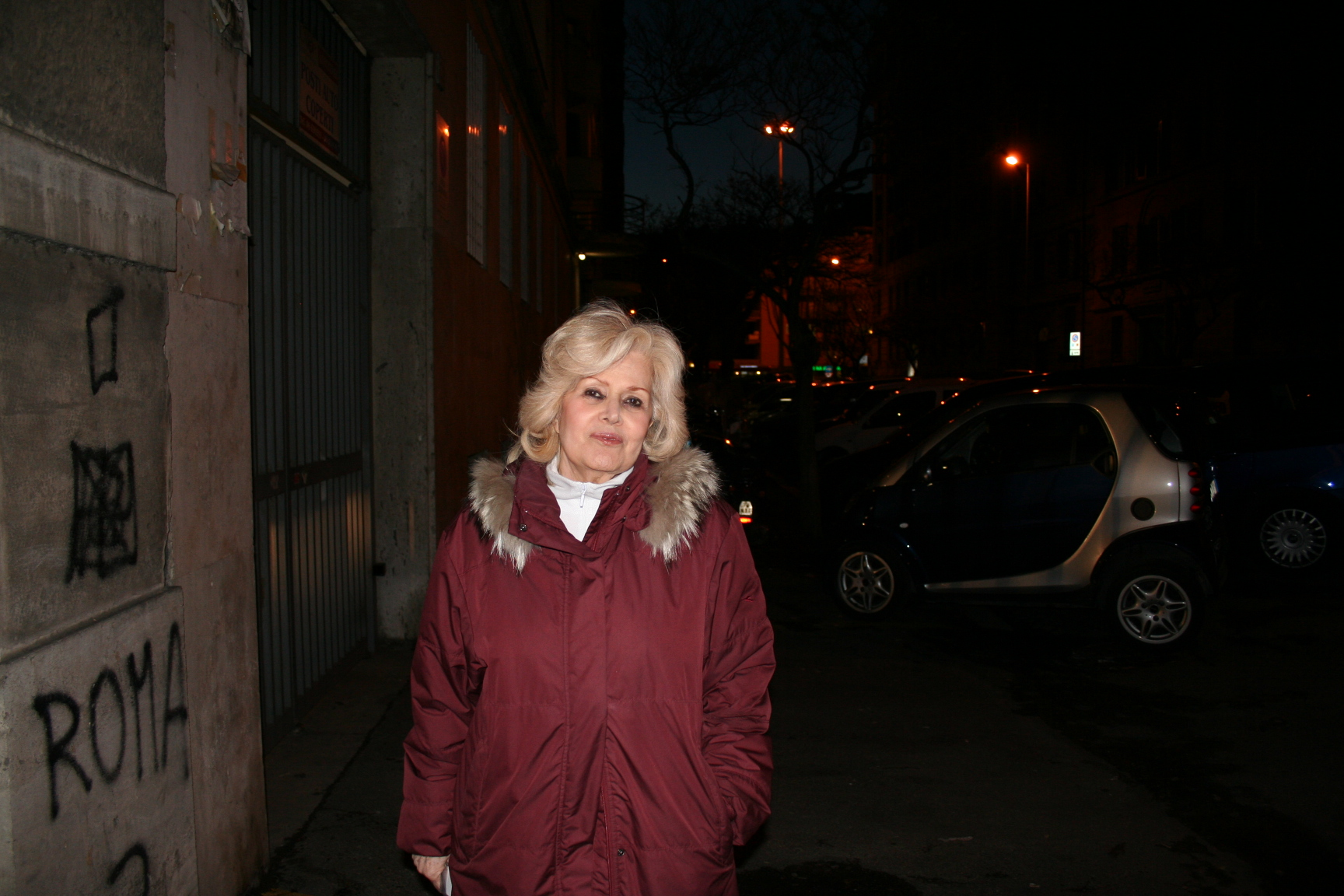

Background information
- Born: 1939 (age 86–87)
- Genre: Pop
- Occupation: Singer
- Years active: 1960s-present
- Labels: Ring, De Ferrari & Devega, C&M, Cinevox

Anna Cantalupo (born 1939), stage name Aura D'Angelo, is an Italian popular singer of the 1960s. In 1972 she received the Vulture d'oro prize at Melfi.

== Career ==
She made her festival debut at the Sanremo Music Festival 1961 singing "Notturno senza luna" with Silvia Guidi. She also appeared in Sanremo Music Festival 1962 singing "Quando il vento d'aprile" with Claudio Villa, and reached the final of Sanremo Music Festival 1963 performing "Tu venisti dal mare insieme" with Arturo Testa, after which she took part in the 1963 San Remo Tour. Her highest placing was eighth.

In 1972, she received the Vulture d'oro prize at Melfi.

== Discography ==
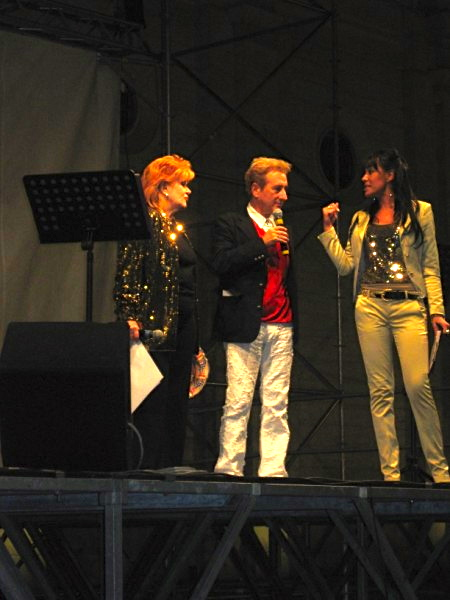
Aura D'Angelo (left) at the memorial of Pino Rucher in 2008.

=== Singles ===
- 1960 – "Musicalità/Sere in grigio" (Carosello, CI 20004)
- 1960 – "Sempre no/Se nel cielo" (Carosello, CI 20005)
- 1961 – "Notturno senza luna/Mandolino... Mandolino..." (Carosello, CI 20016)
- 1961 – "Al di là/Febbre di musica" (Carosello, CI 20017)
- 1961 – "La maschietta futurista/Ballata del pover uomo" (Carosello, CI 20018)
- 1961 – "E la vita continua/Il sole non-tramonta" (Carosello, CI 20021)
- 1961 – "Nulla rimpiangerò/Noi innamorati" (Carosello, CI 20031)
- 1961 – "Eterno ammore/Si nun se chiamma ammore" (Carosello, CI 20038)
- 1961 – "Una canzone per l'estate/Mi sento tua" (Carosello, CI 20047)
- 1961 – "Ton adieu/Ancora" (Carosello, CI 20048)
- 1962 – "Fantastico amore/Ponte verso il sole" (Carosello, CI 20056)
- 1962 – "Quando il vento d'aprile/Addio... Addio..." (Carosello, CI 20057)
- 1962 – "Baciami a Capri/Sbruffon twist" (Carosello, CI 20073)
- 1962 – "Scugliera/Sbruffon twist" (Carosello, CI 20074)
- 1963 – "Tu venisti dal mare/Violino tzigano" (Carosello, CI 20082)
- 1963 – "Cambiati la faccia/Nulla rimpiangerò" (Carosello, CI 20086)
- 1964 – "Forza Lazio/Una risposta" (Carosello, CI 20115)
- 1964 – "... E si nun fosse overo...?/Teneramente" (Carosello, CI 20133)
- 1967 – "La città triste/Oggi con te domani chissà" (Durium, CNA 9189)
- 1967 – "Non mi devi niente/Ma come posso amare te!" (Durium, CNA 9217)
- 1967 – "Sola più che mai/Non mi devi niente" (Durium)
- 1968 – "Questa è la verità/La ricchezza" (Durium, Ld A 7589)
- 1972 – "Il libro dell'amore/Piccola follia" (Napoleon, NP 1012)
- 1980 – "Meglio ridere/E tu lo chiami amore" (C&M, PN 053)
- 1982 – "L'Allegria/L'estae" (C&M, ZBCM 7277)
- 1987 – "Prima/Donne così" (artist center, CNE 011)
- 1992 – "Rionda/Malinconia" (Pinciana, PMX 2070)

=== Albums ===
- 1973 – Dammi un bacio e ti dico di si (Cinevox, SC 33/16)
- 1981 – Periferia (C&M, PNQ 074)
- 1998 – Aura D'Angelo canta Fabor (Ring) – songs of Fabio Fabor
- 2008 – Le indimenticabili (Ring)
- 2008 – Dal mondo... con Genova nel cuore (De Ferrari & Devega) – songs in Genoa dialect
