= Il cielo in una stanza =

Il cielo in una stanza (Italian for 'Heaven in a Room') may refer to:

- "Il cielo in una stanza" (song), a 1960 song by Mina and Gino Paoli
- Il cielo in una stanza (album), a 1960 album by Mina
- Il cielo in una stanza (film), a 1999 comedy film directed by Carlo Vanzina
