= Wilma De Angelis =

Italian singer and television presenter (1930–2026)

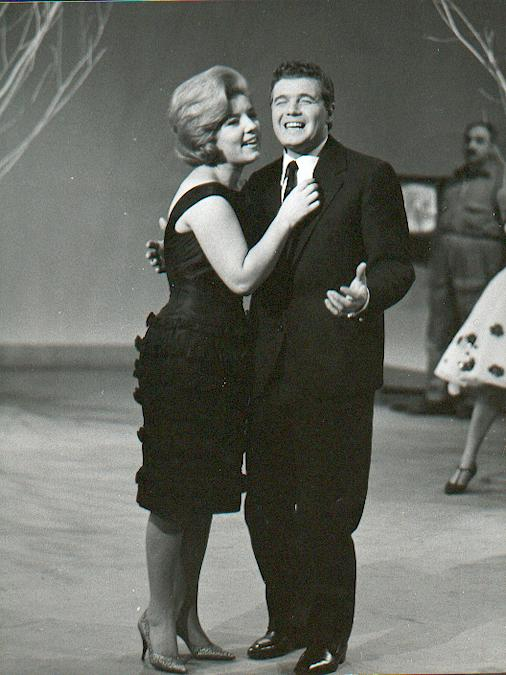
- Wilma De Angelis and Joe Sentieri at the Sanremo Music Festival 1960

Background information
- Born: Vilma De Angelis; 8 April 1930; Milan, Lombardy, Kingdom of Italy
- Died: 11 October 2026 (aged 96) Milan, Lombardy, Italy
- Occupations: Singer; television presenter
- Years active: 1952–2025

Vilma "Wilma" De Angelis (IPA: [ˈvilma de ˈandʒelis]; 8 April 1930 – 11 October 2026) was an Italian singer and television presenter.

== Life and career ==
De Angelis was born in Milan on 8 April 1930. She was agnostic. In 1994, she met her partner Gianni, with whom she stayed for 27 years until his death in 2022. She never married and had no children.

She is best known for her participations in the Sanremo Music Festival from the 1950s to the 1960s – which produced her hits "Nessuno", "Quando vien la sera" and "Patatina" – as well as her cooking shows during her later career; these included Telemenù (1978–1997) and A pranzo con Wilma (1990–1993), both on Telemontecarlo. She authored two cook books.

De Angelis died in Milan on 11 October 2026, at the age of 96. Her funeral was held in San Luigi Gonzaga in her native neighborhood of Corvetto; her body was cremated.

== Sanremo Music Festival participations ==
Year	Title	Songwriters	Coupled with
1959	"Per tutta la vita"	Alberto Testa; Pino Spotti	Jula de Palma
1959	"Nessuno"	Antonietta De Simone; Edilio Capotosti	Betty Curtis
1960	"Quando vien la sera"	Alberto Testa; Carlo Alberto Rossi	Joe Sentieri
1960	"Splende l'arcobaleno"	Cosimo Di Ceglie; Maria Evangelisti Tumminelli	Gloria Christian
1961	"Patatina"	Gianni Meccia; Franco Migliacci	Gianni Meccia
1962	"I colori della felicità"	Eros Sciorilli; Leda Ranzato	Tanya
1962	"Lumicini rossi"	Fabio Fabor; Gian Carlo Testoni	Lucia Altieri
1963	"Non costa niente"	Eros Sciorilli; Diego Calcagno	Johnny Dorelli
1963	"Se passerai di qui"	Gian Carlo Testoni; Angelo Camis	Flo Sandon's

== Television ==
Year(s)	Channel	Title	Role
1978	Various	La parola d'oro	Presenter
1979	Telemontecarlo	Il bolero della sera	Presenter
1979–1997	Telemontecarlo	Telemenù	Presenter
1987–1996	Telemontecarlo	Sale, pepe e... fantasia	Presenter
1990–1993	Telemontecarlo	A pranzo con Wilma	Presenter
1990	Canale 5	C'era una volta il festival	Contestant
1992	Telemontecarlo	In viaggio con Piacere Italia	Presenter
1992, 1994	Canale 5	Simpaticissima	Contestant
1993	Telemontecarlo	Complimenti allo chef	Presenter
1993–1994	Telemontecarlo	La spesa di Wilma	Presenter
1996	Cinquestelle, Odeon TV	La spesa di Wilma	Presenter
1995	Canale 5	Canzoni sotto l'albero	Judge
1996	Cinquestelle, Odeon TV	Wilma... e contorni	Presenter
1997	Telemontecarlo	Due come noi	Presenter
1997–1999	Rai 2	Ci vediamo in TV	Presenter
1998	Rete 4	Sabato 4	Presenter
1999–2000	Rai 1	Alle due su Rai 1	Presenter
2005	Rai 2	Mezzogiorno in famiglia	Cook
2010–2011	Rai 1	Domenica in	Regular guest

== Sources ==
- Baroni, Joseph (2005). Dizionario della televisione: i programmi della televisione commerciale dagli esordi a oggi (in Italian). Milan: Raffaello Cortina. ISBN 88-7078-972-1.
- Sciotti, Antonio (2011). Enciclopedia del Festival della canzone napoletana: 1952-1981: Canta Napoli (in Italian). Preface by Pietro Gargan; contributions by Giuseppe Giorgio, Diego Paura, and Federico Vacalebre. Naples: Luca Torre. ISBN 978-88-906138-0-7.
