= Tintarella di luna (song) =

Single by Mina

from the album Tintarella di luna
- Language: Italian
- B-side: "Mai"
- Released: September 1959
- Genre: Pop; rock and roll
- Length: 3:00
- Label: Italdisc
- Composer: Bruno De Filippi
- Lyricist: Franco Migliacci

Mina singles chronology
"T'ho vista piangere" (1959)	"Tintarella di luna" (1959)	"Te vulevo scurdà" (1959)

"Tintarella di luna" (transl. "Moon tan") is a song recorded by Italian singer Mina. It was written by Bruno De Filippi, at the time a member of the group I Campioni, and Franco Migliacci. The song became the first major hit for the singer, reaching number three in the Italian chart, and its sales exceeded 200,000 copies.

Later in 1960, the song was included on Mina's debut studio album of the same name. Mina also recorded a French version called "Un petit clair de lune".

"Tintarella di luna" was also performed in the 1960 musicarello titled Howlers in the Dock, in which Mina played herself.

The song "Mai", written by Arturo Casadei, Aldo Locatelli, Silvana Simoni, and Aldo Valleroni, was used as the B-side.

== Charts ==
Chart performance for "Tintarella di luna"
Chart (1959–60)	Peak position
Belgium (Ultratop 50 Wallonia)	47
Italy (Musica e dischi)	3

== Cover versions ==
The song has been covered in Italian, French, Spanish, Portuguese (as "Banho de Lua"), Finnish (as ”Oli kuu oli ilta”), Indonesian ( as "Si Rambut Sasak " ) and Japanese (as 月影のナポリ/"Tsukikage no Napori"), by a number of artists, including Dalida, Celly Campello, Bob Azzam, Os Mutantes, The Peanuts, W, Gloria Christian, Ivan Cattaneo, Kai Lind, Vittorio Casagrande, Jo Lemaire + Flouze, and Jenny Luna.
