= Betty Curtis =

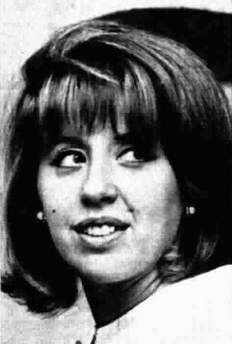
- Curtis in 1964

Background information
- Born: Roberta Corti; 21 March 1936; Milan, Lombardy, Kingdom of Italy
- Died: 15 June 2006 (aged 70) Lecco, Lombardy, Italy
- Genres: Pop
- Occupation: Singer
- Years active: 1957–2004
- Label: CGD

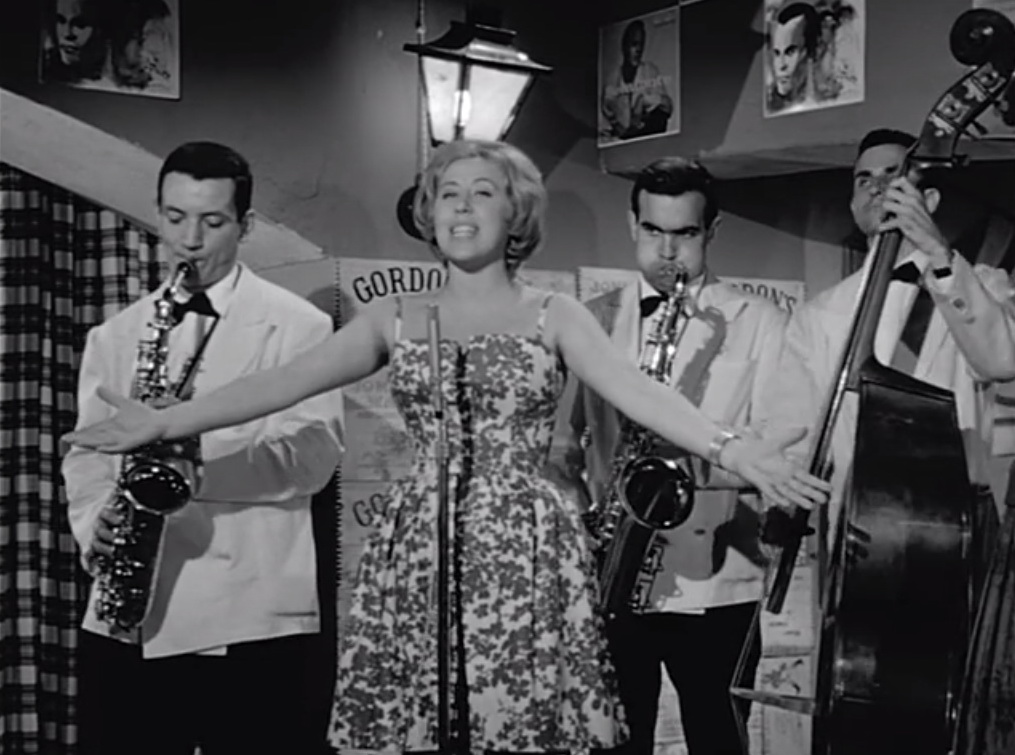
A frame from the 1959 film The Jukebox Boys featuring Betty Curtis

Roberta Corti (21 March 1936 – 15 June 2006), known professionally as Betty Curtis, was an Italian singer active from 1957 to 2004.

Curtis grew up in the Milanese borough of Cagnola, located in the Zone 8. She started singing in night clubs at an early age and was discovered by Teddy Reno in 1958. Her debut single was a rendition of "With All My Heart" performed with the Franco Pisano Orchestra.

Curtis' song "Al di là", performed together with Luciano Tajoli, won the Sanremo Music Festival 1961. With her Sanremo winning song, Curtis represented Italy in the Eurovision Song Contest 1961, held in Cannes, tying for fifth. In 1965, she returned to Sanremo with "Invece no", performed together with Petula Clark.

Curtis' version of "Chariot" ("I Will Follow Him") was used in the soundtrack of Martin Scorsese's film Goodfellas (1990) as well as Pillion (2025).

== Discography ==
=== Albums ===
- 1959: Lontano da te... lontano dal mare (CGD, FGS 5001)
- 1965: Betty (CGD, FGS 5015)
- 1970: A modo mio (CGD, FGS 5075)
- 1975: Folk (Alpharecord, AR 3017)
- 1975: Ricordiamole insieme (Alpharecord, AR 3018)
- 1976: Folk N. 2 (Alpharecord)

=== Singles ===
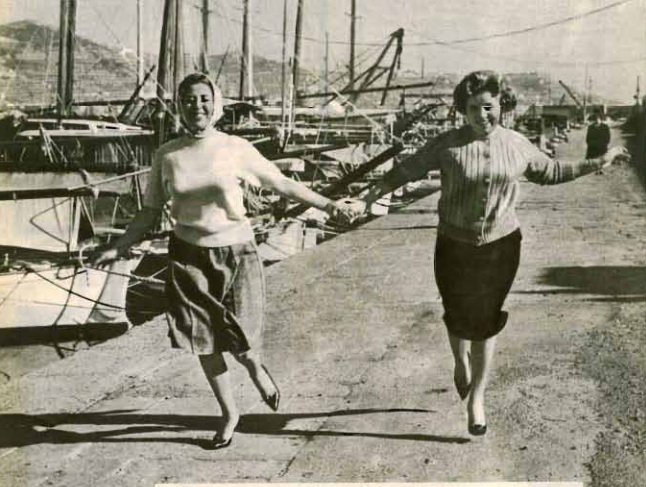
Betty Curtis and Wilma De Angelis in 1959

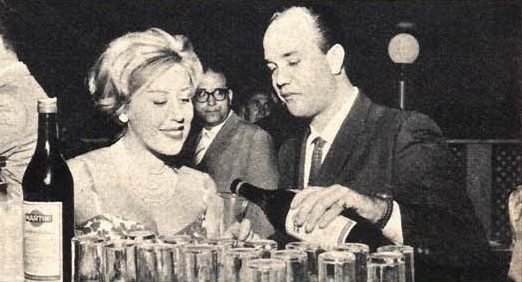
Betty Curtis and composer Peter De Angelis in 1959

- 1958: "Con tutto il cuore" (With All My Heart)
- 1958: "La pioggia cadrà"
- 1959: "Nessuno"
- 1959: "Una marcia in fa" (with Johnny Dorelli)
- 1959: "Buondì" (Alone)
- 1960: "Non sei felice"
- 1960: "Il mio uomo"
- 1961: "Al di là"
- 1961: "Pollo e champagne"
- 1961: "Aiutami a piangere"
- 1961: "Midi Midinette"
- 1961: "Ci vogliono i mariti"
- 1961: "Neve al chiaro di luna"
- 1962: "Buongiorno amore"
- 1962: "Stasera piove"
- 1962: "Soldi soldi soldi"
- 1962: "Tango del mare"
- 1962: "Chariot" (I Will Follow Him)
- 1963: "Wini, wini"
- 1964: "La casa più bella del mondo"
- 1964: "Scegli me o il resto del mondo"
- 1965: "Invece no"
- 1966: "Le porte dell`amore"
- 1967: "È più forte di me"
- 1967: "Guantanamera"
- 1967: "Povero Enrico"
- 1969: "Gelosia"
- 1970: "Donna"
- 1974: "Ma ci pensi tu (Cu Cu Ru Cu Cu Paloma)"
- 1976: "La grulla"
- 1976: "Innamorarsi No!"
- 1978: "Sarò la luce che ti guida" (Candle on the water)

Awards and achievements
Preceded by Tony Dallara and Renato Rascel with "Romantica"	Sanremo Music Festival winner 1961 (with Luciano Tajoli)	Succeeded by Domenico Modugno and Claudio Villa with "Addio, addio"
Preceded by Renato Rascel with "Romantica"	Italy in the Eurovision Song Contest; 1961	Succeeded by Claudio Villa with "Addio, addio"
