= San Luigi Gonzaga =

San Luigi Gonzaga (Italian for 'Saint Aloysius Gonzaga') may refer to the following churches in Italy:

- San Luigi Gonzaga, Corteranzo
- San Luigi Gonzaga, Milan
