= È vero =

Single by Mina

from the album Tintarella di luna
- Language: Italian
- B-side: "Perdoniamoci"
- Released: 18 January 1960
- Genre: Pop
- Length: 3:00
- Label: Italdisc
- Composer: Umberto Bindi
- Lyricist: Nicola Salerno

Mina singles chronology
"Folle banderuola" (1959)	"È vero" (1960)	"Non sei felice" (1960)

"È vero" (English: "It's true") is a song recorded by Italian singer Mina. It was written by Umberto Bindi and Nicola Salerno. With this song, Mina participated in the 1960 Sanremo Music Festival for the first time, taking eighth place. Despite this, the song was a great success, taking fourth place in the Italian chart. By the end of 1960, sales of the single amounted to 70 thousand copies.

== Track listing ==
7" single
A. "È vero" – 3:00
B. "Perdoniamoci" (Umberto Bertini, Enzo Di Paola) – 1:58

== Charts ==
Chart performance for "È vero"
Chart (1960)	Peak position
Italy (Musica e dischi)	4
