= Una zebra a pois =

Single by Mina

from the album Il cielo in una stanza
- Language: Italian
- B-side: "Mi vuoi lasciar"
- Released: 14 June 1960
- Genre: Mambo; swing
- Length: 3:25
- Label: Italdisc
- Composer: Lelio Luttazzi
- Lyricists: Lelio Luttazzi; Dino Verde; Marcello Ciorciolini

Mina singles chronology
"Serafino campanaro" (1960)	"Una zebra a pois" (1960)	"Il cielo in una stanza" (1960)

"Una zebra a pois" (English: "A Polka Dot Zebra") is a song written by Lelio Luttazzi, Dino Verde and Marcello Ciorciolini. In 1960, the song was recorded and released as a single by singer Mina. The song was not a great success, peaking at number eighteen on the Italian chart for one week. The song "Mi vuoi lasciar" written by Nicola Salerno and Mansueto De Ponti was used as a B-side. Mina also recorded this song in English (for the US release of the single "This World We Love In (Il cielo in una stanza)," adapted lyrics by Don Raye) and Spanish (lyrics by Salerno).

== Critical reception ==
Claudio Milano from Ondarock in a retrospective review called "Una zebra a pois" a "real miracle," and that Luttazzi offers an arrangement worthy of the greatest classics of American song. He also noted the complex structure of the composition, which requires Mina to have a truly important ability to perform, comparing her to Yma Sumac. "Mina seems to literally fly on the song, she lives the rhythm as something inherent to her system," Milano wrote.

== Track listing ==
7" single
A. "Una zebra a pois" – 3:25
B. "Mi vuoi lasciar" (Nicola Salerno, Mansueto De Ponti) – 2:59

== Charts ==
Chart performance for "Una zebra a pois" by Mina
Chart (1960)	Peak position
Italy (Musica e dischi)	18
