= Tintarella di luna =

Studio album by Mina
- Released: March 1960
- Recorded: 1959–1960
- Genre: Pop
- Length: 29:49
- Language: Italian; English
- Label: Italdisc

Mina chronology
Tintarella di luna (1960)	Il cielo in una stanza (1960)

Tintarella di luna is the debut studio album by Italian singer Mina. It was released in March 1960, by Italdisc. Despite the fact that the songs contained on the album have previously been released on various singles and EPs, it is considered not a compilation album, but a debut album in the official discography of the singer.

== Content ==
This album contains tracks with which Mina has achieved success in the Italian charts. First of all, it is "Tintarella di luna", the first major hit, as well as "Folle banderuola". Another bright spot of the album was the song "È vero", with which she participated in the Sanremo Music Festival 1960 and received widespread critical acclaim. It should also be noted, among other things, the track "My Crazy Baby", one of the few authored by Mina herself.

== Critical reception ==
According to the reviewer of Optimagazine, this album was the soundtrack of an entire generation of Italians experiencing an economic boom, the empowerment of young people and especially women.

== Track listing ==
Side A
No.	Title	Lyrics	Music	Length
1.	"Folle banderuola"	Gianni Meccia	Meccia	2:20
2.	"È vero"	Nicola Salerno	Umberto Bindi	2:06
3.	"Whisky"	Aldo Alberini	Daisy Lumini	2:48
4.	"My Crazy Baby"	Mina	Yaşar Güvenir; Albrecht Marcuse	2:36
5.	"Nessuno"	Antonietta De Simone	Edilio Capotosti; Vittorio Mascheroni	2:12
6.	"Ho scritto col fuoco"	Vito Pallavicini	Pino Massara	2:26
Total length:				14:28

Side B
No.	Title	Lyrics	Music	Length
1.	"Tintarella di luna"	Franco Migliacci	Bruno De Filippi	2:57
2.	"La verità"	Umberto Bertini	Vincenzo Di Paola; Sandro Taccani	2:09
3.	"Non sei felice"	Riccardo Vantellini	Giuseppe Perotti	2:30
4.	"Piangere un po'"	Leo Chiosso	Umberto Prous	2:24
5.	"La luna e il cow boy"	Nicola Salerno	Vittorio Buffoli	2:43
6.	"Vorrei sapere perché"	Lucio Fulci; Piero Vivarelli	Adriano Celentano	2:38
Total length:				15:21
