= Stessa spiaggia, stesso mare =

Studio album by Mina
- Released: 1 October 1963
- Genre: Pop; bossa nova
- Length: 29:59
- Language: Italian
- Label: Italdisc

Mina chronology
Renato (1962)	Stessa spiaggia, stesso mare (1963)	20 successi di Mina (1964)

Singles from Stessa spiaggia, stesso mare
- 1. "Stessa spiaggia, stesso mare" Released: 16 May 1963; 2. "La ragazza dell'ombrellone accanto" Released: September 1963

Stessa spiaggia, stesso mare is the sixth studio album by Italian singer Mina, released on 1 October 1963 through Italdisc.

== Track listing ==
Side A
No.	Title	Writer(s)	Length
1.	"Stessa spiaggia, stesso mare"	Mogol; Piero Soffici	2:11
2.	"Stranger Boy"	Leo Chiosso; Umberto Prous	3:04
3.	"Mi guardano"	Chiosso; Prous	2:44
4.	"Qué no, qué no!"	Tullio Romano; Pierino Codevilla	1:47
5.	"Non piangerò (Just Let Me Cry)"	Mark Barkan; Ben Raleigh; Chiosso	2:20
6.	"Si, lo so (Heißer Sand)"	Werner Scharfenberger; Alberto Testa; Mogol	3:02
Total length:			15:08

Side B
No.	Title	Writer(s)	Length
1.	"La ragazza dell'ombrellone accanto"	Vittorio Buffoli; Vito Pallavicini	2:25
2.	"Dindi (Dindi)"	Antônio Carlos Jobim; Aloísio de Oliveira	2:53
3.	"Ollàlà Gigi"	Buffoli; Pallavicini	2:17
4.	"Chega de saudade (Chega de Saudade)"	Jobim; Vinícius de Moraes; Giorgio Calabrese	2:51
5.	"A volte (Pretend That I'm Her)"	Norman Blagman; Sam Bobrick; Chiosso	2:22
6.	"Eravamo in tre"	Romano Farinatti; Giuseppe Capotorto	2:03
Total length:			14:51

== Cover versions ==
Some of the songs of this album have been recorded in different languages by Mina during the 1960s. "Stessa spiaggia, stesso mare" has been covered in French ("Tout s'arrange quand on s'aime") and in Spanish ("La misma playa"). "Mi guardano" has two different versions: in Spanish ("Me miran") and a second Italian version (for the 1970 album ...quando tu mi spiavi in cima a un batticuore...). The track "Non piangerò" was recorded in three other languages: in English ("Just Let Me Cry"), in Spanish ("Déjame llorar") and in French ("Pleurer pour toi"). Mina sang the original German version of "Sì, lo so" ("Heißer Sand"), and also the Spanish ("Un desierto") and the French one ("Notre étoile"). In 2005, she covered again Jobim's "Dindi" in English (for L'allieva). Finally, she recorded the original version of "A volte", "Pretend That I'm Her". All these songs have been published, during the 1990s, in different unofficial compilations (Notre etoile, Mina latina due, Mina canta in spagnolo, Internazionale, Mina canta in inglese).
