= Coriandoli =

Song by Mina

from the album Il cielo in una stanza
- Language: Italian
- Released: March 1960
- Length: 3:09
- Label: Italdisc
- Composers: Roberto Livraghi; Walter Baracchi
- Lyricist: Leo Chiosso

"Coriandoli" (English: "Confetti") is a song composed by Roberto Livraghi and Walter Baracchi with lyrics by Leo Chiosso. The song was recorded by Italian singer Mina in 1960 and was originally released as a B-side to the single "Tessie Tessie". However, "Coriandoli" became much more popular, reaching number seven in the Italian hit parade. Mina also included the song in the album Il cielo in una stanza. By December 1960, it had sold 50,000 copies.

Mina recorded a French version called "Confetti" with lyrics by Fernand Bonifay.

== Charts ==
Chart performance for "Coriandoli"
Chart (1960)	Peak position
Italy (Musica e dischi)	7
