= Melodien, die die Welt erobern =

Studio album by Connie Francis
- Released: October 1966
- Recorded: June 17, 18, and 19, 1966
- Genre: Pop
- Label: MGM; 65 061 (mono)/665 061 (stereo)
- Producer: Gerhard Mendelson

Connie Francis chronology
Connie Francis Sings All-Time International Hits (1966)	Melodien, die die Welt erobern (1966)	Movie Greats of the 60s (1966)

Melodien, die die Welt erobern is a studio album recorded for the German market by U. S. Entertainer Connie Francis.

== History ==
Beginning in 1960 with the overwhelming # 1 chart success of Die Liebe ist ein seltsames Spiel, a German version of her own U. S. hit Everybody's Somebody's Fool, Francis had established herself in Germany as a respected performer of contemporary German music over the next years, scoring five further # 1 hits.

Her former albums on the German market had either been compilations of her greatest German hits or local releases of her U. S. albums. The 1966 Melodien, die die Welt erobern was the first of only two German concept albums, being followed by Lass mich bei dir sein in 1967. Recording sessions were held between June 17 and 19, 1966, at DGG's studios in Munich.

Over the previous years of working with renowned German and Austrian arrangers and composers like Werner Scharfenberger, Erwin Halletz or Johannes Fehring, Francis had frequently praised the high quality of Germany's musical output, claiming Germany to be her favorite music recording spot outside the United States although those sessions actually had taken place in Vienna, Austria, or the playbacks had been pre-recorded in Vienna and Connie Francis had overdubbed her vocals in studios located in Las Vegas, New York City and even Paris. The sessions for Melodien, die die Welt erobern were the first ever for Connie Francis to take place in Germany. But for Melodien, die die Welt erobern (which loosely translates as Melodies that took the world by a storm), Francis and her German producer Gerhard Mendelson wanted to go for a more international sound. Thus, it was decided to re-record eleven songs which Francis had recorded between July 1960 and May 1966 for her American album projects:

- Dance My Trouble Away (Zorba's Dance) from Movie Greats Of The 60s (1966), recorded with an orchestra conducted by Benny Golson
- Jealous Heart from Jealous Heart (1966), recorded with an orchestra conducted by Ernie Freeman
- Love is a Many-Splendored Thing from Connie Francis sings "Never on Sunday" (1961), recorded with an orchestra conducted by Cliff Parman
- Malagueña from Connie Francis sings Spanish And Latin American Favorites (1960), recorded with an orchestra conducted by Geoff Love
- Moon River from Connie Francis sings Award Winning Motion Picture Hits (1962/1963), recorded with an orchestra conducted by Geoff Love
- O mein Papa from Connie Francis sings Jewish Favorites (1960), recorded with an orchestra conducted by Geoff Love
- Over the Rainbow from Connie Francis sings Award Winning Motion Picture Hits (1963), recorded with an orchestra conducted by Geoff Love
- Romantica from Connie Francis sings Modern Italian Hits (1962/1963), recorded with an orchestra conducted by Luglio Libano
- Three Coins in the Fountain from Connie Francis sings "Never on Sunday" (1961), recorded with an orchestra conducted by Cliff Parman
- True Love from Greatest American Waltzes (1963), recorded with an orchestra conducted by Bill McElhiney
- Vaya, Con Dios from Connie Francis sings Spanish And Latin American Favorites (1960), recorded with an orchestra conducted by Geoff Love

Tapes containing the instrumental playbacks of these recordings were shipped to Munich, where Francis overdubbed her German vocals. For Over the Rainbow and Moon River, taken from the album Connie Francis sings Award Winning Motion Picture Hits, the playbacks of the 1962 versions were used. See also:

The only song previously not recorded by Francis was Heißer Sand. Gerhard Mendelson had insisted that the album should feature at least one song of German origin which had gained the status World Wide Hit. Since Mina – another international star protégéed in Germany by Mendelson – had brought Heißer Sand not only to # 1 of the German charts but also made it an international success by recording it in Italian, French, and Spanish, followed by cover versions in Dutch and English by Anneke Grönloh as well as an instrumental version by Ron Goodwin and his orchestra, the inclusion of the song on Melodien, die die Welt erobern was an obvious choice. For the Francis recording, Mina's original backing track from 1962 was used.

The album was released in late 1966 as a tie-in to Francis' first German TV special of the same name. No song was culled for a single release.

== Track listing ==
=== Side A ===
#	Title	Songwriter	Length
1.	"Wenn du in meinen Träumen bei mir bist (Over The Rainbow)"	Harold Arlen, E. Y. Harburg, Ernst Verch	3.52
2.	"Malagueña" (German version)	Ernesto Lecuona, Ernst Verch	3.11
3.	"Deine Liebe (True Love)"	Cole Porter, Glando	3.12
4.	"Heißer Sand"	Werner Scharfenberger, Kurt Feltz	3.02
5.	"Für immer (Moon River)"	Henry Mancini, Johnny Mercer, Joachim Relin	2.44
6.	"Zorba's Tanz (Dance My Trouble Away)"	Mikis Theodorakis, Al Stillman, Ernst Bader	3.23

=== Side B ===
#	Title	Songwriter	Length
1.	"Drei Münzen im Brunnen (Three Coins in the Fountain)"	Jule Styne, Sammy Cahn, Hans Fritz Beckmann	3.10
2.	"O mein Papa" (German version)	Paul Burkhard	3.32
3.	"Sag, weißt du denn, was Liebe ist (Love Is a Many-Splendored Thing)"	Sammy Fain, Paul Francis Webster, Ernst Verch	2.49
4.	"Blaue Nacht am Hafen (Jealous Heart)"	Jenny Lou Carson, Nicola Wilke	2.36
5.	"Vaya Con Dios" (German version)	Larry Russell, Inez James, Buddy Pepper, Kurt Feltz	3.18
6.	"Romantica" (German Version)	Renato Rascel, Eduardo Verde, Roger Joseph Berthier, Arno Gillo	3.10
