= Country Music Connie Style =

Studio album by Connie Francis
- Released: 1962
- Label: MGM

Connie Francis chronology
Connie Francis Sings "Second Hand Love" (1962)	Country Music Connie Style (1962)	Connie Francis Sings Modern Italian Hits (1962)

Country Music Connie Style is an album by American singer Connie Francis, released in 1962 by MGM Records.

== Content ==
On this album, Francis covers country hits.

== Critical reception ==
Professional ratings
Review scores
Source	Rating
Billboard	positive

Billboard reviewed the album in its issue from September 15, 1962, noting that many of Francis's "recent hits ha[d] had a strong country flavor" and that now "she turn[ed] to the real thing." "Smash wax that's right in the current groove," concluded the reviewer.

== Chart performance ==
The album peaked at number 22 on the monaural half of Billboard's Top LPs chart in October 1962.

== Track listing ==
LP

Side 1
No.	Title	Writer(s)	Length
1.	"I Really Don't Want to Know"	Barnes–Robertson
2.	"Oh, Lonesome Me"	Gibson
3.	"I Fall to Pieces"	Cochran–Howard
4.	"Someday (You'll Want Me to Want You)"	Hodges
5.	"I Walk the Line"	Cash
6.	"He Thinks I Still Care"	Lipscomb

Side 2
No.	Title	Writer(s)	Length
1.	"She'll Have to Go"	J. and A. Allison
2.	"I'm Movin' On"	Snow
3.	"I Don't Hurt Anymore"	Rollins–Robertson
4.	"I'm a Fool to Care"	Daffan
5.	"I Can't Stop Loving You"	Gibson
6.	"Heartaches by the Number"	Howard

== Charts ==
Chart (1962)	Peak position
US Billboard Top LPs – Monaural LPs	22
