= Nessuno =

Single by Mina

from the album Tintarella di luna
- B-side: "Tua"
- Released: 1959
- Genre: Pop
- Label: Italdisc
- Songwriter(s): Antonietta De Simone, Edilio Capotosti

Mina singles chronology
"My True Love" (1959)	"Nessuno" (1959)	"Io sono il vento" (1959)

Audio
- "Nessuno" on YouTube

"Nessuno" ("Nobody") is a 1959 Italian song composed by Antonietta De Simone and Edilio Capotosti. The song premiered at the ninth edition of the Sanremo Music Festival, with a double performance by Wilma De Angelis and Betty Curtis, and placed at the eighth place.

Ignored by the public in its original versions, the song got a large commercial success thanks to the rock'n'roll version recorded by Mina. Mina's version was performed in fortissimo and in a syncopated style, distorting the linearity of the original melody. This version of the song premiered at the Festival of Rock and Roll held at the Milan Ice Palace. Thanks to the song Mina got her early television appearances, performing the song in the three most popular television shows of the time, Il Musichiere, Lascia o raddoppia? and Canzonissima, in the latter case in a duet with De Angelis. Mina also performed the song, in a slightly different version, in the 1960 Lucio Fulci's film Howlers in the Dock.

The song was later covered by numerous artists, including Johnny Dorelli, Nilla Pizzi, Jula De Palma, Tony Dallara, Fiorello, Nico Fidenco, Miranda Martino.

Mina's "Nessuno" was released as a "double A-side" together with another song from the Sanremo Festival, "Tua", which had been originally performed by Jula De Palma and Tonina Torrielli.

== Track listing ==
- 7" single – MH-23
1. "Tua" (Bruno Pallesi, Walter Malgoni)
2. "Nessuno" (Antonietta De Simone, Edilio Capotosti)
