= Connie Francis Sings Award Winning Motion Picture Hits =

Connie Francis sings Award Winning Motion Picture Hits

Studio album by Connie Francis
- Released: May 1963
- Recorded: April 26–28, 1962; March 15, 1963; March 22, 1963; April 4, 1963
- Genre: Pop
- Labels: MGM; E-4048 (mono)/SE-4048 (stereo)
- Producers: Norman Newell, Danny Davis

Connie Francis chronology
Connie Francis sings Modern Italian Hits (1963)	Connie Francis sings Award Winning Motion Picture Hits (1963)	"Mala Femmena" and Connie's Big Hits from Italy (1963)

Professional ratings
Review scores
Source	Rating
New Record Mirror	(US-edition)

Connie Francis sings Award Winning Motion Picture Hits is a studio album recorded by American pop singer Connie Francis.

== Background ==
In April 1962, Connie Francis was working mostly in Europe, recording several German language songs at Austrophon Studio, located in the basement of the Konzerthaus in Vienna. Between April 26 and 28, Francis spent three days in Rome, recording a set of thirteen songs intended for an album of Academy Award-winning songs:

- "All the Way" from The Joker Is Wild (1957)
- "Buttons and Bows" from The Paleface (1948)
- "High Hopes" from A Hole in the Head (1959)
- "Lullaby of Broadway" from Gold Diggers of 1935 (1935)
- "Moon River" from Breakfast at Tiffany's (1961)
- "Over the Rainbow" from The Wizard of Oz (1939)
- "The Last Time I Saw Paris" from Lady Be Good (1941)
- "The Way You Look Tonight" from Swing Time (1936)
- "Secret Love" from Calamity Jane (1953)
- "Whatever Will Be, Will Be (Qué Será, Será)" from The Man Who Knew Too Much (1956)
- "When You Wish upon a Star" from Pinocchio (1940)
- "You'll Never Know" from Hello, Frisco, Hello (1943)
- "Zip-a-Dee-Dooh-Dah" from Song of the South (1946)

The playbacks to these songs had been pre-recorded at EMI's famous Abbey Road Studios in London under the supervision of Francis' British producer Norman Newell and were conducted by Geoff Love. The tapes of these playbacks had been shipped to Rome, where Francis overdubbed her vocals at RCA Italiana Studios. Francis was unsatisfied with the results and it was decided to postpone the album's release which had originally been planned for early summer of 1962.

== Rerecording ==
The album remained in the vaults until March 1963. When Francis decided to record the winning song from the 1963 Academy Award ceremony, "Days of Wine and Roses," plans were made to include this recording to the set of songs from the 1962 sessions. Yet, Francis still was not satisfied with the whole album and asked orchestra leader Don Costa - who had arranged and conducted her # 1 hit "Don't Break the Heart That Loves You" in November 1961 and was also in charge of Francis' recording of "Days of Wine and Roses" - to create and record new playbacks for the 1962 recordings while keeping Francis' original vocals.

Between March 15 and April 4, 1963, Costa recorded new playbacks to twelve of the thirteen songs; some of them even underwent a second treatment until Francis was finally satisfied with the results. The recording of "Over the Rainbow" was heavily edited by removing the repetition of the second verse and cutting down its running time from 3:46 minutes to 2:38 minutes. One track, however, was left untouched, "Buttons and Bows" from the motion picture The Paleface, and remained completely unreleased until 1996.

== Release ==
The remaining twelve songs were combined with "Days of Wine and Roses," and the album was finally released in May 1963 in the U. S. as MGM Records 12" Album SE-4048 (stereo) and E-4048 (mono).

In Australia (Cat.-No. S 027592) and New Zealand (Cat.-No. MCS 5017), though, it came to a mix-up of mastertapes. Here the original 1962 recordings from Rome were released with Days of Wine and Roses missing.

In Brazil, the album was released under the title Connie Francis canta Témas premiadas do Cinema. It featured the same track listing as the U. S. edition.

== Chart performance ==
The album entered Billboard magazine's Top LP's chart in the issue dated June 15, 1963, peaking at No. 108 during a five-week run on the chart. The album debuted on Cashbox magazine's Top 100 Albums chart in the issue dated May 18, 1963, and was ranked much higher by the magazine, peaking at No. 33 during a fourteen-week run on the chart. On the magazine's Top Stereo Albums chart the album peaked at No. 20 during a nine-week run.

== Track listing US-Edition with new 1963 Playbacks ==
=== Side A ===
#	Title	Songwriter	Length
1.	"Days of Wine and Roses"	Henry Mancini, Johnny Mercer	3.00
2.	"Secret Love"	Sammy Fain, Paul Francis Webster	2.50
3.	"Zip-a-Dee-Doo-Dah"	Allie Wrubel, Ray Gilbert	1.38
4.	"When You Wish upon a Star"	Leigh Harline, Ned Washington	3.10
5.	"Whatever Will Be, Will Be (Que Sera, Sera)"	Jay Livingston, Ray Evans	2.23
6.	"Over the Rainbow"	Harold Arlen, E. Y. Harburg	2.38

=== Side B ===
#	Title	Songwriter	Length
1.	"Moon River"	Henry Mancini, Johnny Mercer	2.42
2.	"Lullaby of Broadway"	Harry Warren, Al Dubin	2.38
3.	"You'll Never Know"	Harry Warren, Mack Gordon	3.32
4.	"The Last Time I Saw Paris"	Jerome Kern, Oscar Hammerstein II	3.15
5.	"High Hopes"	Jimmy van Heusen, Sammy Cahn	2.32
6.	"The Way You Look Tonight"	Jerome Kern, Dorothy Fields	3.12
7.	"All the Way"	Jimmy van Heusen, Sammy Cahn	2.35

== Track listing New Zealand and Australia edition with original 1962 Playbacks ==
=== Side A ===
#	Title	Songwriter	Length
1.	"Moon River"	Henry Mancini, Johnny Mercer	2.42
2.	"Secret Love"	Sammy Fain, Paul Francis Webster	2.50
3.	"Zip-a-Dee-Doo-Dah"	Allie Wrubel, Ray Gilbert	1.38
4.	"When You Wish upon a Star"	Leigh Harline, Ned Washington	3.08
5.	"Whatever Will Be, Will Be (Que Sera, Sera)"	Jay Livingston, Ray Evans	2.28
6.	"Over the Rainbow"	Harold Arlen, E. Y. Harburg	3.46

=== Side B ===
#	Title	Songwriter	Length
1.	"Lullaby of Broadway"	Harry Warren, Al Dubin	2.38
2.	"You'll Never Know"	Harry Warren, Mack Gordon	3.28
3.	"The Last Time I Saw Paris"	Jerome Kern, Oscar Hammerstein II	3.15
4.	"High Hopes"	Jimmy van Heusen, Sammy Cahn	2.32
5.	"The Way You Look Tonight"	Jerome Kern, Dorothy Fields	3.12
6.	"All the Way"	Jimmy van Heusen, Sammy Cahn	2.35

== Not included songs from the sessions ==
#	Title	Songwriter	Length	Remark
1.	"Buttons and Bows"	Jay Livingston, Ray Evans	2.26	Recorded April 1962, only song from the sessions not reworked in 1963

== Foreign-language versions ==
In 1966, Francis recorded German versions of Over the Rainbow and Moon River for her German concept album Melodien, die die Welt erobern, overdubbing her German vocals to the original 1962 playbacks.

== Charts ==
Chart (1963)	Peak position
US Billboard Top LPs	108
US Cashbox Top 100 Albums (Monoraul)	33
US Cashbox Top 50 Albums (Stereo)	20
