= Stessa spiaggia, stesso mare (song) =

Single by Mina

from the album Stessa spiaggia, stesso mare
- Language: Italian
- B-side: "Ollallà Gigi"
- Released: 16 May 1963
- Genre: Pop
- Length: 2:12
- Label: Italdisc
- Composer: Piero Soffici
- Lyricist: Mogol

Mina singles chronology
"Capitano" (1963)	"Stessa spiaggia, stesso mare" (1963)	"La ragazza dell'ombrellone accanto" (1963)

Audio
- "Stessa spiaggia, stesso mare" on YouTube

"Stessa spiaggia, stesso mare" (English: "Same beach, same sea") is a song written by Piero Soffici and Mogol. Italian singer Piero Focaccia was the first to record the song, but Mina released the song about a month earlier. It is noteworthy that Mina uses the same arrangement as in the original, rather than adapting it for herself as she used to do with cover versions.

Despite the boycott by RAI and the absence of any promotion due to the well-known events related to Mina's affair with married actor Corrado Pani, the song becomes a hit. It debuted at number thirteen on the Italian singles chart and peaked at number four in the seventh week of its stay, while the song spent a total of fourteen weeks on the chart. The B-side was the song "Ollallà Gigi", which was written by Vito Pallavicini and Vittorio Buffoli; both songs were performed with an orchestra conducted by Tony De Vita.

Focaccia's version was also a success, winning the Un disco per l'estate competition and launching his career.

Later, Mina re-recorded the song "Stessa spiaggia, stesso mare" in French ("Tout s'arrange quand on s'aime", lyrics by André Salvet and Claude Carrère) and in Spanish ("La misma playa", lyrics by Manuel Salina).

== Track listing ==
7" single
A. "Stessa spiaggia, stesso mare" – 2:12
B. "Ollallà Gigi" (Vito Pallavicini, Vittorio Buffoli) – 2:14

== Charts ==
Chart performance for "Stessa spiaggia, stesso mare" by Mina
Chart (1963)	Peak position
Italy (Musica e dischi)	4

Chart performance for "Stessa spiaggia, stesso mare" by Piero Focaccia
Chart (1963)	Peak position
Italy (Musica e dischi)	4
