= Folle banderuola =

Single by Mina

from the album Tintarella di luna
- Language: Italian
- B-side: "Un disco e tu"
- Released: December 1959
- Genre: Pop
- Length: 2:20
- Label: Italdisc
- Songwriter: Gianni Meccia

Mina singles chronology
"Vorrei sapere perchè" (1959)	"Folle banderuola" (1959)	"È vero" (1960)

"Folle banderuola" (English: "Crazy weathervane") is a song written by Gianni Meccia and initially recorded by Italian singer Mina. It was released as a single in 1959 and reached 18 place on the Italian chart. By December 1960, sales of the single had approached 50,000 copies. The song "Un disco e tu" was used as a b-side. Both songs were arranged by Giulio Libano. Later, "Folle banderuola" was included in the singer's debut album, Tintarella di luna (1960).

Mina also recorded a French version called "Folle girouette" with adapted lyrics by Roger Berthier.

In 1960 Mina sang it in the musical film I Teddy boys della canzone in one of the scenes.

== Track listing ==
7" single
A. "Folle banderuola" – 2:20
B. "Un disco e tu" (Franco Franchi, Santi Latora, Riccardo Rauchi) – 1:58

== Charts ==
Chart performance for "Folle banderuola"
Chart (1960)	Peak position
Italy (Musica e dischi)	18
