= Il cielo in una stanza (album) =

Studio album by Mina
- Released: June 1960
- Genre: Musica leggera
- Length: 29:59
- Language: Italian
- Label: Italdisc

Mina chronology
Tintarella di luna (1960)	Il cielo in una stanza (1960)	Due note (1961)

Il cielo in una stanza is the second studio album by Italian singer Mina, released in June 1960 through Italdisc.

== Overview ==
The album is a compilation of previously released singles, except for "Ho paura", which will be released as an encore of the single "Piano" in October. The length of the songs on the album is slightly shorter than on the singles, in order to fit all the songs on one side of the record in fifteen minutes.

Mina is accompanied on the album by an orchestra conducted by Tony De Vita.

The main hit of the album was the song "Il cielo in una stanza", which spent eleven weeks at number one on the Italian chart. Even if the actual authors of the song "Il cielo in una stanza" are Gino Paoli and Mogol, the credits of the album say the authors were Toang (Renato Angiolini) and Mogol. The song was covered by Mina herself in 1969 (for the album I discorsi) and in 1988 (for the album Oggi ti amo di più).

The album was released in June 1960. The following year, the album was released in Argentina and Peru (with the song titles translated into Spanish and a different track order), Venezuela (with the Tintarella di luna album cover) and Brazil (also with a different cover). In 1992, the album was re-released by the Raro Records! label separately and as part of a box set (with Mina's first three albums).

== Track listing ==
Side A
No.	Title	Writer(s)	Length
1.	"Il cielo in una stanza"	Renato Angiolini; Mogol	2:54
2.	"Pesci rossi"	Tony De Vita	2:21
3.	"Briciole di baci"	Carlo Donida Labati; Mogol	2:37
4.	"Ho paura"	Pino Donaggio; Bruno Pallesi	3:01
5.	"Personalità (Mr. Personality)"	Lloyd Price; Mike Logan; Giuseppe Perotti	2:29
6.	"La nonna Magdalena"	Nicola Salerno; Vito Pallavicini; Pino Massara	2:12
Total length:			15:34

Side B
No.	Title	Writer(s)	Length
1.	"Coriandoli"	Leo Chiosso; Roberto Livraghi	3:12
2.	"Una zebra a pois"	Lelio Luttazzi; Dino Verde; Marcello Ciorciolini	2:09
3.	"Invoco te"	Glauco Masetti; Giancarlo Testoni	3:05
4.	"Rossetto sul colletto (Lipstick on Your Collar)"	George Goehring; Edna Lewis; Elvia Figliuolo	1:31
5.	"Serafino campanaro"	Salerno; Mansueto De Ponti	2:07
6.	"Un piccolo raggio di luna"	Salerno; Berto Pisano	2:21
Total length:			14:25
