= Al di là =

1961 single

Single by Betty Curtis
- Language: Italian
- Released: 1961
- Composer: Carlo Donida
- Lyricist: Mogol

Eurovision Song Contest 1961 entry
- Country: Italy
- Artist: Roberta Corti
- As: Betty Curtis
- Language: Italian
- Composer: Carlo Donida
- Lyricist: Mogol
- Conductor: Gianfranco Intra

Finals performance
- Final result: 5th
- Final points: 12

Entry chronology
- ◄ "Romantica" (1960)
- "Addio, addio" (1962) ►

"Al di là"

Single by Emilio Pericoli
- B-side: "Sassi"
- Released: 1961 (Italy); May 1962 (US)
- Recorded: 1961
- Genre: Traditional pop
- Length: 2:04
- Label: Warner Bros. Records
- Composer: Carlo Donida
- Lyricist: Mogol

"Al Di La"

Single by Connie Francis
- A-side: "I'm Gonna Be Warm This Winter"
- Released: December 1962
- Recorded: 11 November 1962
- Genre: Traditional pop
- Length: 2:25 (A-side); 3:17 (B-side)
- Label: MGM Records K 13116
- Composer: Carlo Donida
- Lyricist: Ervin Drake
- Producer: Danny Davis

Connie Francis US singles chronology
"I Was Such a Fool (To Fall in Love with You)" / "He Thinks I Still Care" (1962)	"Al Di La" (1962)	"Follow the Boys" / "Waiting for Billy" (1963)

"Al Di La"

Single by Ray Charles Singers

from the album Command Performances
- B-side: "Till The End Of Time"
- Released: 1964
- Recorded: 1964
- Genre: Easy listening
- Length: 2:05
- Label: Command
- Composer: Carlo Donida
- Lyricist: Ervin Drake
- Producer: Enoch Light

Ray Charles Singers singles chronology
"Love Me with All Your Heart" (1964)	"Al Di La" (1964)	"One More Time" (1964)

"Al di là" ("Beyond") is a song written by Italian composer Carlo Donida and lyricist Mogol, and recorded by Betty Curtis. The English lyrics were written by Ervin Drake. The song represented Italy in the Eurovision Song Contest 1961, performed in Italian by Curtis at the Palais des Festivals in Cannes, France, on 18 March 1961, after it had won the Sanremo Music Festival 1961 on 2 February.

Donida is best known in America for writing "Uno dei tanti", or "I (Who Have Nothing)". English lyricist Drake also wrote the lyrics for such songs as "Quando, quando, quando" and "Good Morning Heartache", and both the music and lyrics for "It Was a Very Good Year".

== Cover versions ==
- In the United States, Emilio Pericoli is the artist most associated with the song. He sang "Al di là" in a nightclub, with a small combo, in the popular 1962 film Rome Adventure, starring Troy Donahue and Suzanne Pleshette, and his single that year on Warner Bros. Records reached number six on Billboard's pop chart and number three on the easy-listening chart. Pericoli's version ranked #48 on Billboard's 1962 Year-End chart. Pericoli's album version of the song is not the same as in the film. It is much slower and recorded with a full orchestra. (In the film, Donahue's character interprets the song's title as meaning "Beyond the Beyond".) In the UK Singles Chart, Pericoli's version peaked only at number 30, but spent 14 weeks in the Record Retailer Top 50, beginning on 30 June 1962.
- It was also recorded by Italian-American singer Connie Francis in Italian in 1962 and in a bilingual version later during the same year, with Connie writing the English lyrics instead of using Ervin Drake's.
- Willy Alberti released a version in 1962 and on his 1973 album, Van levenslied tot opera.
- Al Hirt also appears in Rome Adventure and plays the song in a nightclub scene. He released a version on his 1963 album, Honey in the Horn.
- Jerry Vale released a version on his 1963 album, Arrivederci, Roma. This version was also part of the soundtrack of the 2019 film The Irishman.
- The Ray Charles Singers scored a 1964 hit, peaking at #29 on Billboard's Hot 100 chart with their cover of the song.
- Al Martino, who would later play the fictional crooner Johnny Fontaine in the 1972 film The Godfather, recorded "Al di là" in Italian on his 1963 The Italian Voices of Al Martino album (Capitol Records).
- In 1966 Don Cornell recorded a cover of the song for the album Andiamo - Let's go with Don Cornell, orchestra directed by Joe Guercio (ABC-Paramount - ABCS 537).
- Sergio Franchi is another Italian-American singer associated with this popular song. He recorded on his 1968 RCA Victor album, Wine and Song. Franchi also sang the song on the 26 December 1964, broadcast of The Hollywood Palace.
- In 1994 Délcio Tavares recorded a cover for the Brazilian market on the Italianíssimo II album (ACIT, 60062250).
- Patrizio Buanne recorded on his 2015 Decca Records album Viva la Dolce Vita singing in English and Italian.
- Other notable recording include Milva (1961), Ace Cannon – Sweet and Tough (1966), Jerry Adriani (1996).
- Janice Harper, Capitol Records, 1961.

== Charts ==
Artist	Year	Peak chart positions		
Artist	Year	ITA	US	CAN
Betty Curtis	1961	11	—	—
Luciano Tajoli	1961	3	—	—
Emilio Pericoli	1961	2	6	—
Tony Dallara	1961	32	—	—
Connie Francis	1962	—	90	25
The Ray Charles Singers	1964	—	29	—
