= Ernesto Bonino =

Italian singer (1922–2008)

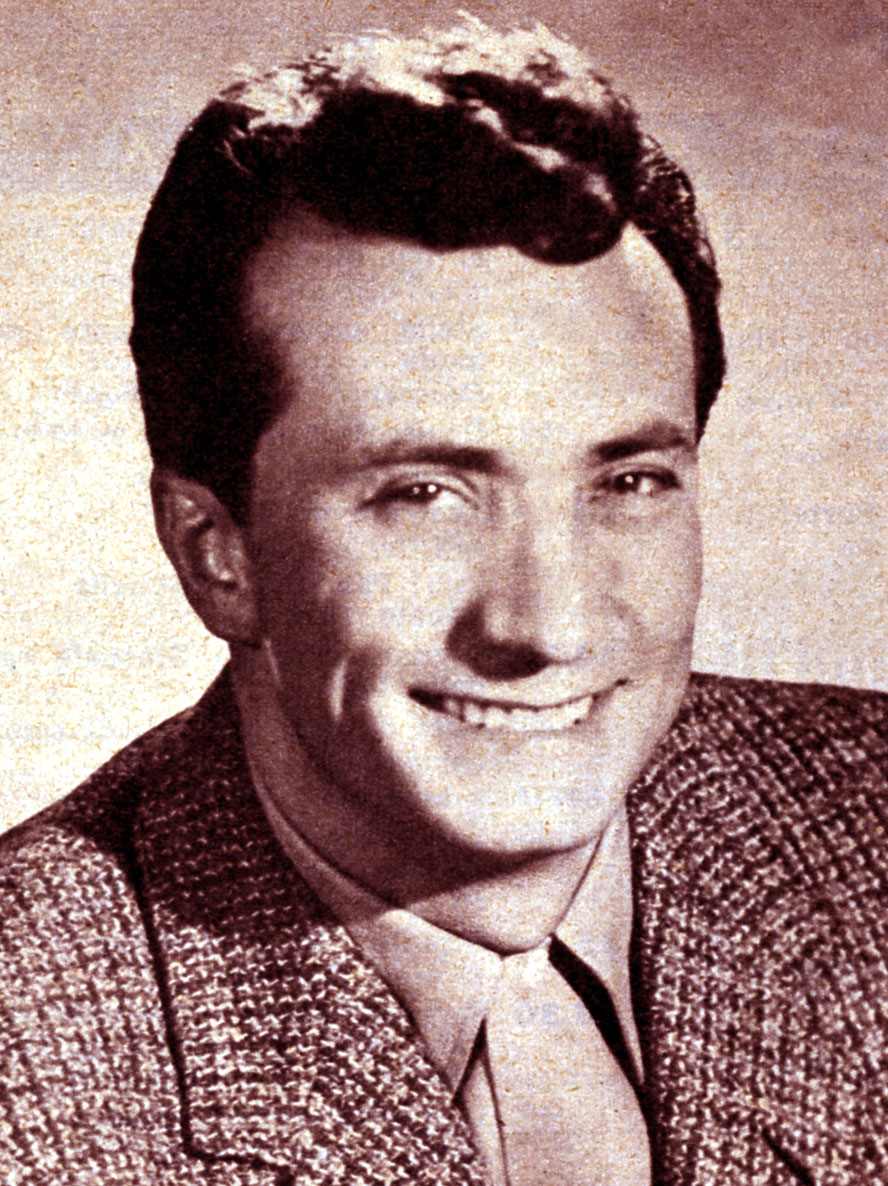
Ernesto Bonino in 1959

Ernesto Pietro Bonino (16 January 1922 – 29 April 2008) was an Italian singer of pop and jazz standards whose peak of popularity was during the 1940s and 1950s.

A native of Turin, Ernesto Bonino began his career in the late 1930s as a teenage singer in the lively club scene of his hometown. Another contemporary Turin performer, Fred Buscaglione, was also starting his singing occupation in the same fashion. Music impresario/conductor Carlo Prato, who had earlier promoted a Dutch sister act into the very popular Trio Lescano, heard Bonino and arranged an audition for him at the Italian state radio company EIAR. His broadcast debut came on 5 January 1941 with the song "Tango argentino". It was an instant success and other hits followed, including "La paloma", "Se fossi milionario", "La famiglia canterina" (with Trio Lescano), "A Zonzo", "Musica maestro", "Il giovanotto matto", "Ti comprerò l'armonica" and "Conosci mia cugina?". During the 1940s, Bonino, dubbed "Mister Swing", rivalled only Natalino Otto and Alberto Rabagliati in terms of popularity.

In 1947, two years after the end of World War II, he embarked on a long tour of Latin America, performing in Peru, Argentina, Chile, Brazil, Venezuela, Mexico and Cuba, where he and actress/singer Tina De Mola took Havana theatergoers by storm with their song "Chinito chinita".

In 1952 Ernesto Bonino moved to the United States and realized his dream of singing jazz standards in the best clubs of New York City, Chicago and Miami. He made a brief comeback to Italy in 1955 for the Garinei and Giovannini musical comedy La Granduchessa e i camerieri (The Grand Duchess and the Valets). When the run was finished, he returned to the U.S. and remained until 1958. His sole participation in the renowned Sanremo Music Festival came in 1962, when he placed third with "Gondolì, gondolà", written by the duo Carosone-Nisa. After the contest, Carosone hired him for the European tour of his band.

After that successful tour, however, changing musical tastes slowly led to the fading of Bonino's popularity and, in 1986, he underwent a surgical procedure which resulted in the loss of his voice. By December 2000, when he was nearly eighty, the state recognized his artistic merit and contribution to Italian culture by granting him a special government life pension.

Ernesto Bonino was 86 years old when he died at the Giuseppe Verdi Retirement Home for Artists in Milan, where he had been residing since 23 April 2003.
