= Cocky Mazzetti =

Italian singer (1937–2024)

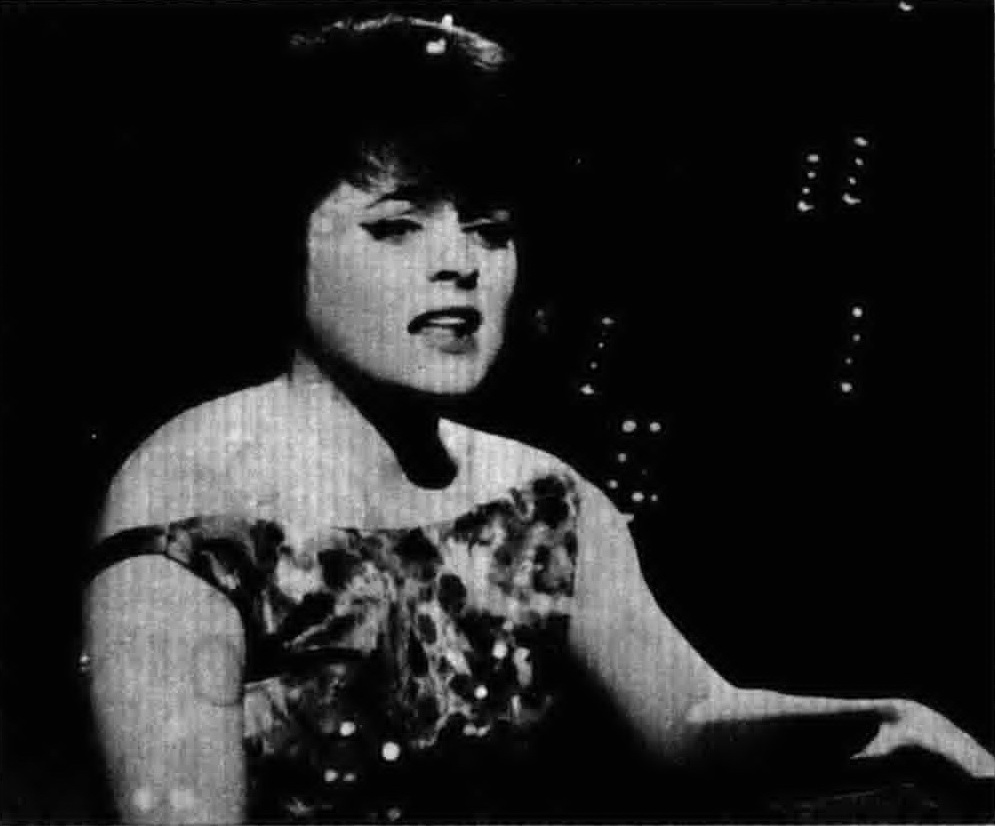
- Mazzetti in Radiocorriere magazine, 1962
- Born: Elsa Mazzetti; 28 February 1937; Milan, Kingdom of Italy
- Died: 20 March 2024 (aged 87); Milan, Italy
- Occupation: Singer

Elsa Mazzetti (28 February 1937 – 20 March 2024), better known as Cocky Mazzetti, was an Italian pop singer, mainly successful in the 1960s.

== Life and career ==
Born in Milan, Mazzetti studied piano and singing and made her official debut in 1955, with the group Menestrelli del Jazz ('Minstrels of Jazz'), with whom she toured in Spain, Turkey, Egypt and Lebanon. In the late 1950s she adopted the stage name Cocky, which was the name of her poodle. She had her first hit in 1961 with "Pepito", an Italian-language cover of Los Machucambos' song.

In the following years Mazzetti took part in some of the most important musical events in Italy, including four editions of the Sanremo Music Festival, where in 1963 she got her major hit with Pino Donaggio's twist song "Giovane giovane", the Festival di Napoli, where in 1962 she ranked third with "Nuttata 'e luna", the Cantagiro, the Festival delle Rose and the Italian Song Festival of Zurich. Her success declined in the second half of the 1960s.

In the early 1980s Mazzetti was part of the group Oldies, together with Nicola Arigliano, Wilma De Angelis, Ernesto Bonino and Claudio Celli. Between late 1990s and early 2000s she was a recurring guest in Paolo Limiti's RAI nostalgia-themed music TV-shows. Mazzetti died on 20 March 2024, at the age of 87.
