= Addio, addio =

1962 song by Claudio Villa

Single by Claudio Villa
- Language: Italian
- Released: 1962
- Composer: Domenico Modugno
- Lyricist: Franco Migliacci

Eurovision Song Contest 1962 entry
- Country: Italy
- Artist: Claudio Villa
- Language: Italian
- Composer: Domenico Modugno
- Lyricist: Franco Migliacci
- Conductor: Cinico Angelini

Finals performance
- Final result: 9th
- Final points: 3

Entry chronology
- ◄ "Al di là" (1961)
- "Uno per tutte" (1963) ►

"Addio, addio" ("Farewell, Farewell") is a song written by Domenico Modugno and Franco Migliacci, and performed by both Claudio Villa and Modugno himself. It won the 12th edition of the Sanremo Music Festival and represented Italy in the Eurovision Song Contest 1962.

== Sanremo ==
"Addio, addio" competed in the 12th edition of the Sanremo Music Festival performed by both Claudio Villa and Domenico Modugno and won the competition, receiving almost 1.5 million votes from the public. As the festival was used by Radiotelevisione italiana (RAI) to select its song and performer for the 2nd edition of the Eurovision Song Contest, the song became the Italian entry for the contest, with Villa chosen as the performer.

== Eurovision ==
With music by Domenico Modugno and lyrics by Franco Migliacci (the same duo had collaborated on Modugno's previous entry "Nel blu dipinto di blu"), the song is a ballad, in which Villa attempts to deal with the end of a relationship. He sings that "our love has become salt like sea water / our parched lips don't have words any longer", but clings to the hope that "it isn't true that our love has ended", indeed even as he farewells his former lover for the last time he sings "we love each other and that we're breaking up".

The song was performed fifteenth on the night, following Luxembourg's Camillo Felgen with "Petit bonhomme" and preceding Monaco's François Deguelt with "Dis rien". At the close of voting, it had received 3 points, placing 9th in a field of 16. The comparatively high place for a low-scoring song is partly explained by the fact that four entries at this Contest failed to record a point.

It was succeeded as Italian representative at the 1963 contest by Emilio Pericoli with "Uno per tutte".

== Single Release ==
The song was released as a single by Claudio Villa with the song "Quando il vento d'aprile" as the B side. In addition, Domenico Modugno also released his version of the song as a single, with the song "Lupi e pecorelle" as the B side.

== Charts ==
Chart (1962)	Peak position
Italy (Musica e dischi)	4
