= San Luigi Gonzaga, Milan =

San Luigi Gonzaga
- Chiesa di San Luigi Gonzaga (Italian)
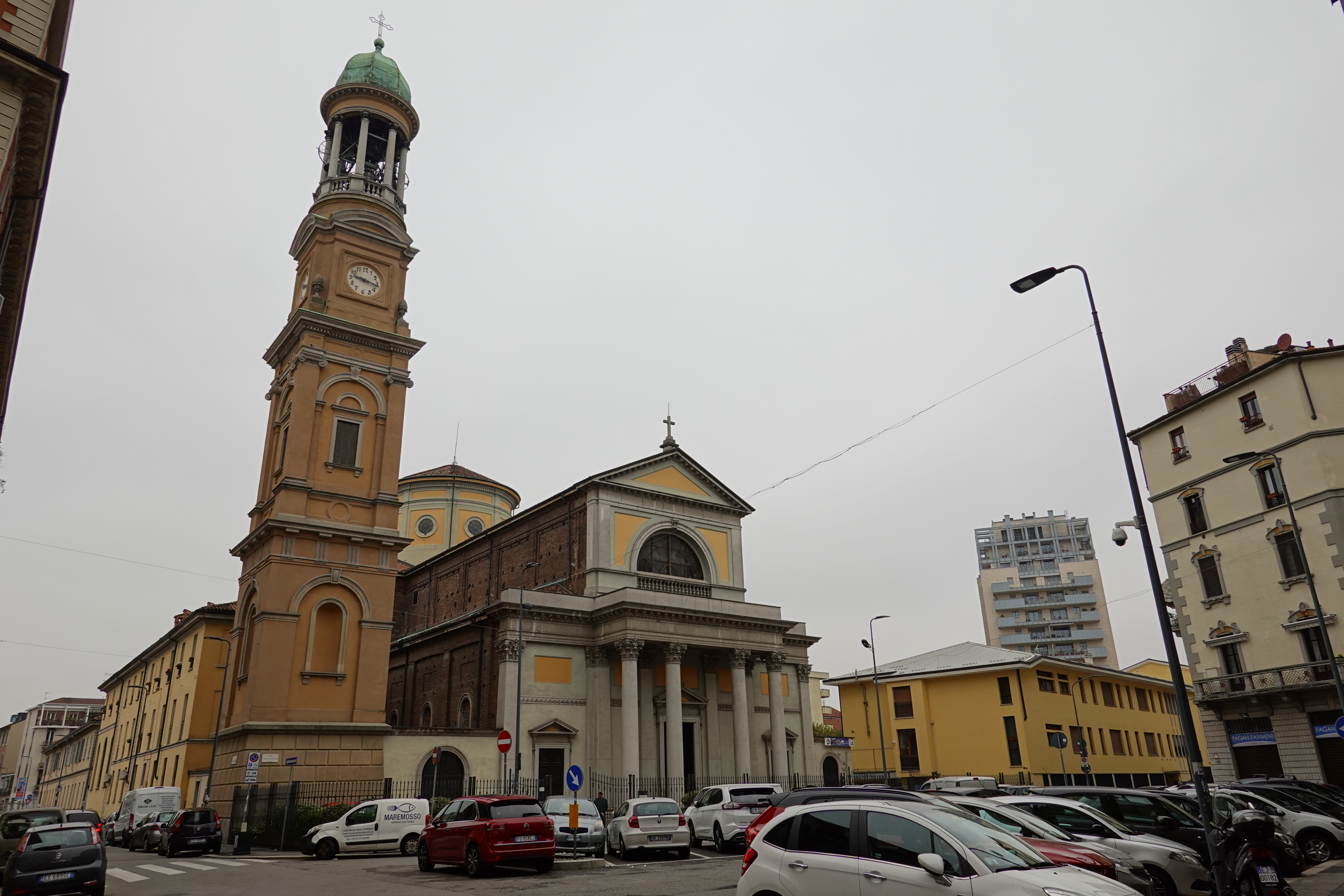
- San Luigi Gonzaga, Milan in 2019
- Click on the map for a fullscreen view
- 45°26′37.79″N 9°12′48.13″E
- Country: Italy
- Denomination: Roman Catholic

Architecture
- Functional status: Active

Administration
- Diocese: Archdiocese of Milan

San Luigi Gonzaga is a Roman Catholic church located in Milan, Italy.

== History ==
The church was built between 1892 and 1897 as a tribute to mark the twenty-fifth anniversary of the elevation to the episcopate of the archbishop of Milan, Luigi Nazari di Calabiana. The project was designed by the parish priest of Vergiate, architect Don Enrico Locatelli, with the consultation of engineer Antonio Casati.

The foundation stone was laid by Nazari di Calabiana on November 20, 1892, but he died on October 23 of the following year and was unable to see its completion. The church was therefore consecrated by his successor to the episcopal seat of Milan, Cardinal Andrea Carlo Ferrari, in a ceremony held on July 3, 1897.

== Description ==
The building has a three-nave structure, with the central one ending in a windowed apse and being bordered by marble columns. The façade has a protruding central section supported by four columns, while the bell tower, located to the side of the church, stands 50 meters tall and features an eclectic design.
