= Arturo Testa =

Italian singer (1932–2021)

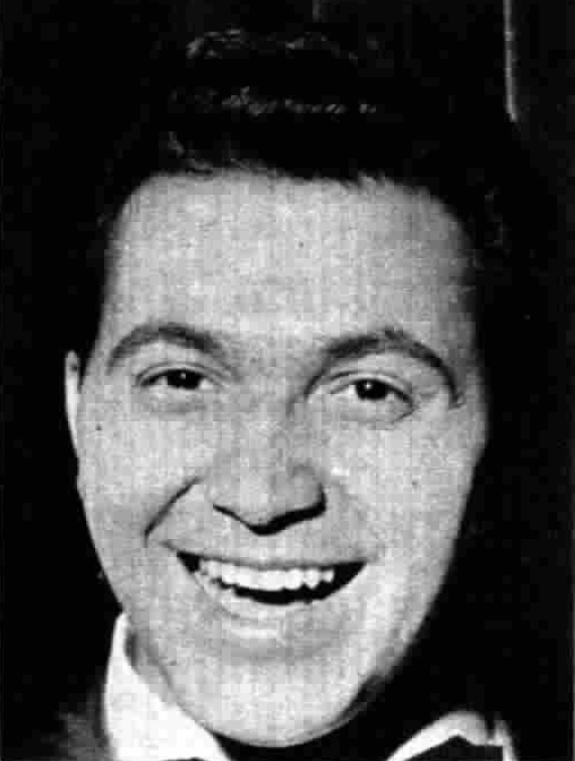
- Born: 15 August 1932; Milan, Kingdom of Italy
- Died: 12 May 2021 (aged 88); Milan, Italy
- Occupation: Singer

Arturo Testa (15 August 1932 - 12 May 2021) was an Italian baritone and pop singer, mainly successful between the 1950s and the 1970s.

== Life and career ==
Born in Milan, a passionate about opera since childhood, Testa played the shepherd boy in a production of Giacomo Puccini's Tosca at the age of nine. After studying with Carlo Tagliabue, in 1951 he started a professional career as a baritone. In 1955, he entered the orchestra by Piero Soffici, and in 1958, he became a member of the Pippo Barzizza Orchestra.

In 1959, Testa had his breakout with his signature song, "Io sono il vento", which ranked second at the 9th Sanremo Music Festival. In the following years, he took part in four more editions of the Sanremo Festival, two editions of the Festival di Napoli and in Canzonissima. In 1968, he shifted his focus to opera and operetta and achieved major success over the next decade. In 2001, he ran for mayor of Milan with the Pensioners' Party, getting just 0.78% of the votes. He died on 12 May 2021, at the age of 88.
