= Luciano Tajoli =

Italian singer and actor

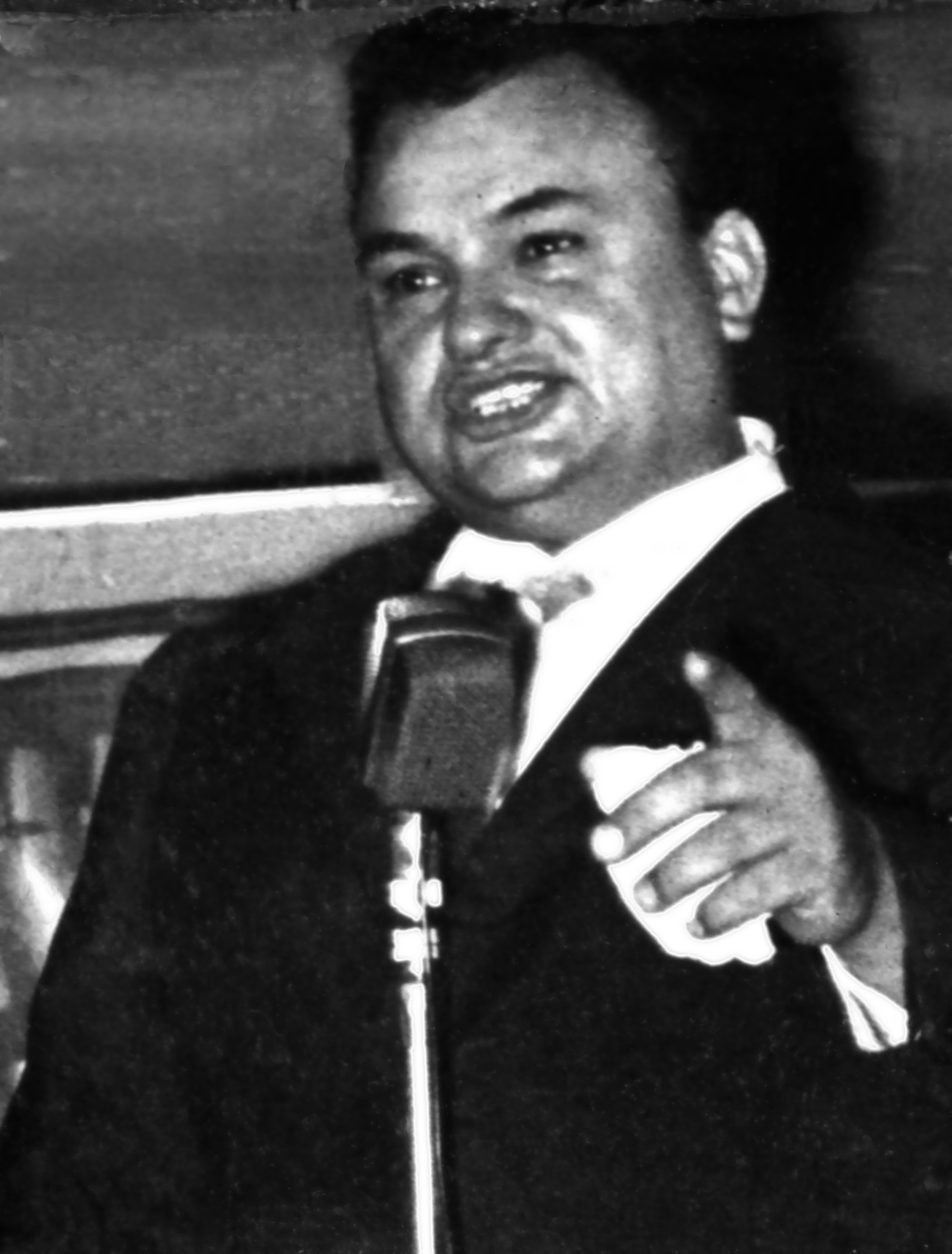
- Tajoli in 1958
- Born: 17 April 1920; Milan, Kingdom of Italy
- Died: 3 August 1996 (aged 76); Merate, Italy
- Occupations: Singer; actor
- Height: 1.6 m (5 ft 3 in)

Luciano Tajoli (17 April 1920 – 3 August 1996) was an Italian singer and actor. He is best remembered for his participations (1961, 1962, 1963, and 1970) in the Sanremo Music Festival, winning in 1961 with the song "Al di là". It is estimated that he sold over 45 million records.

== Personal life ==
Tajoli was born in Milan to a poor family and was a self-taught singer. He trained as an apprentice in tailor, barber and cobbler's shops. Due to polio in his childhood, he always leaned during his performances, e.g., against a chair or piano. His limping was accommodated into the screenplays of his film appearances. He died, aged 76, in Merate.

== Selected filmography ==
- The Taming of the Shrew (1942)
- Songs in the Streets (1950)
- Trieste mia! (1951)
- The Two Sergeants (1951)
- Don Lorenzo (1952)
- Il romanzo della mia vita (1952)
- La pattuglia dell'Amba Alagi (1953)
- Napoli piange e ride (1954)
- The Two Rivals (1960)
- Song of Naples (1957)
