= Il cielo in una stanza (song) =

Single by Mina

from the album Il cielo in una stanza
- B-side: "La notte"
- Released: June 1960
- Genre: Pop
- Length: 2:43
- Label: Italdisc
- Songwriter: Gino Paoli

Mina singles chronology
"Coriandoli" (1960)	"Il cielo in una stanza" (1960)	"Due note" (1960)

"Il cielo in una stanza" (Italian pronunciation: [il ˈtʃɛːlo in una ˈstantsa]; "Heaven in a Room") is a song written by Gino Paoli and originally recorded by Italian singer Mina for the album of the same name. The song was released as a single in June 1960 by Italdisc. It became a commercial success in Italy, topping the charts for eleven consecutive weeks and later returning to number one for three additional weeks. It is also Mina's best-selling single in Italy, with estimated sales of 400.000 copies and over 8 million worldwide.

The song was subsequently re-recorded by several artists, including Paoli himself, Franco Simone, Ornella Vanoni, Giorgia, Carla Bruni and Mike Patton. In 2018, Paoli's version of the song was certified gold by the Federation of the Italian Music Industry.

== Background ==
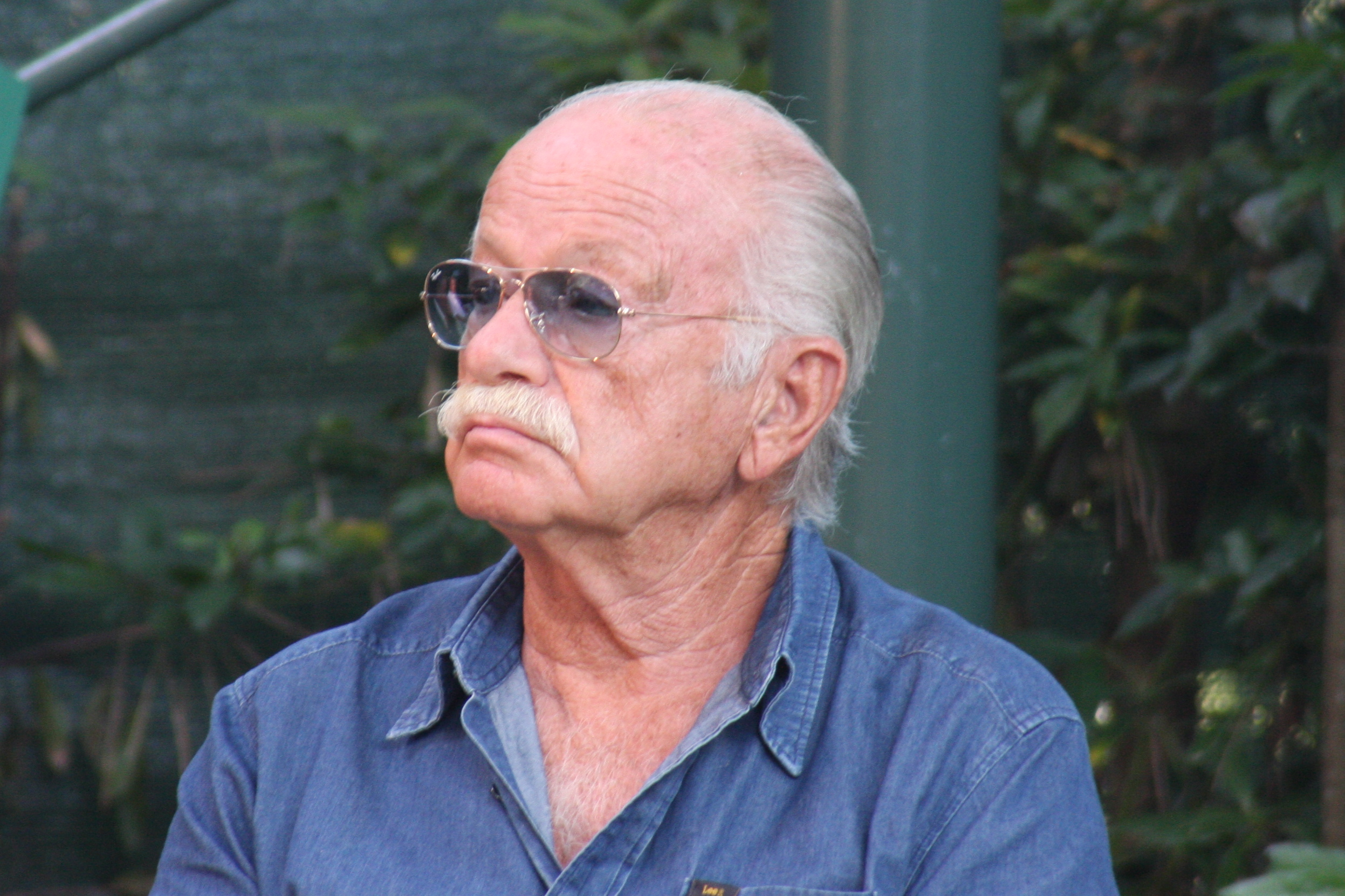
Gino Paoli is the author of the song.

The song was entirely written by Gino Paoli, who was still a little known singer-songwriter. Since Paoli was not registered to the Italian Society of Authors and Publishers, "Il cielo in una stanza" was initially credited to Toang and Mogol. Paoli explained that the song was inspired by the one-night relationship with a prostitute: "I wanted to describe the moment in which you are in a bed with a woman, you just had sex, and in the air you feel a sort of magic, which you don't know where it comes from and which immediately vanishes. In that moment you understand that you are nobody, but there's the whole world in your soul. Obviously I could not put in the lyrics the central moment of the story, the sex act. And I started to go around in circles, talking about the rumours in the street, the walls... a spiral path in which the unsaid triumphs".

The song was initially proposed to other Italian singers, including Jula De Palma and Miranda Martino, but they turned down the opportunity to record it. Therefore, Mogol decided to ask Mina to perform "Il cielo in una stanza" and, despite her initial skepticism, she accepted it after hearing a live performance by Paoli himself. The original version of the song was arranged by Tony De Vita.

== Critical reception ==
In 2010, the linguist Giuseppe Antonelli considered the lyrics of the song as very modern, praising Paoli for his "artistic sensibility" and for the decision to adopt a language which is very close to spoken Italian. Gino Castaldo of the Italian newspaper la Repubblica also applauded Mina's performance, claiming in 1988 that the song marked a change in her vocal style, who became a mature interpreter with "Il cielo in una stanza", discovering she could "give voice to an important song, making it higher, unaccessible" and departing from the urlatrice style which characterized her previous production. Despite this, Paoli criticized Mina's version of the song in 2010, considering Carla Bruni a better performer of the song and claiming that "Mina sings it the same way she would sing the phone book. I don't know if she understands what she sings. She performs it as if she was a perfect technical instrument, like a flute or a guitar".

== Media appearances and references in popular culture ==
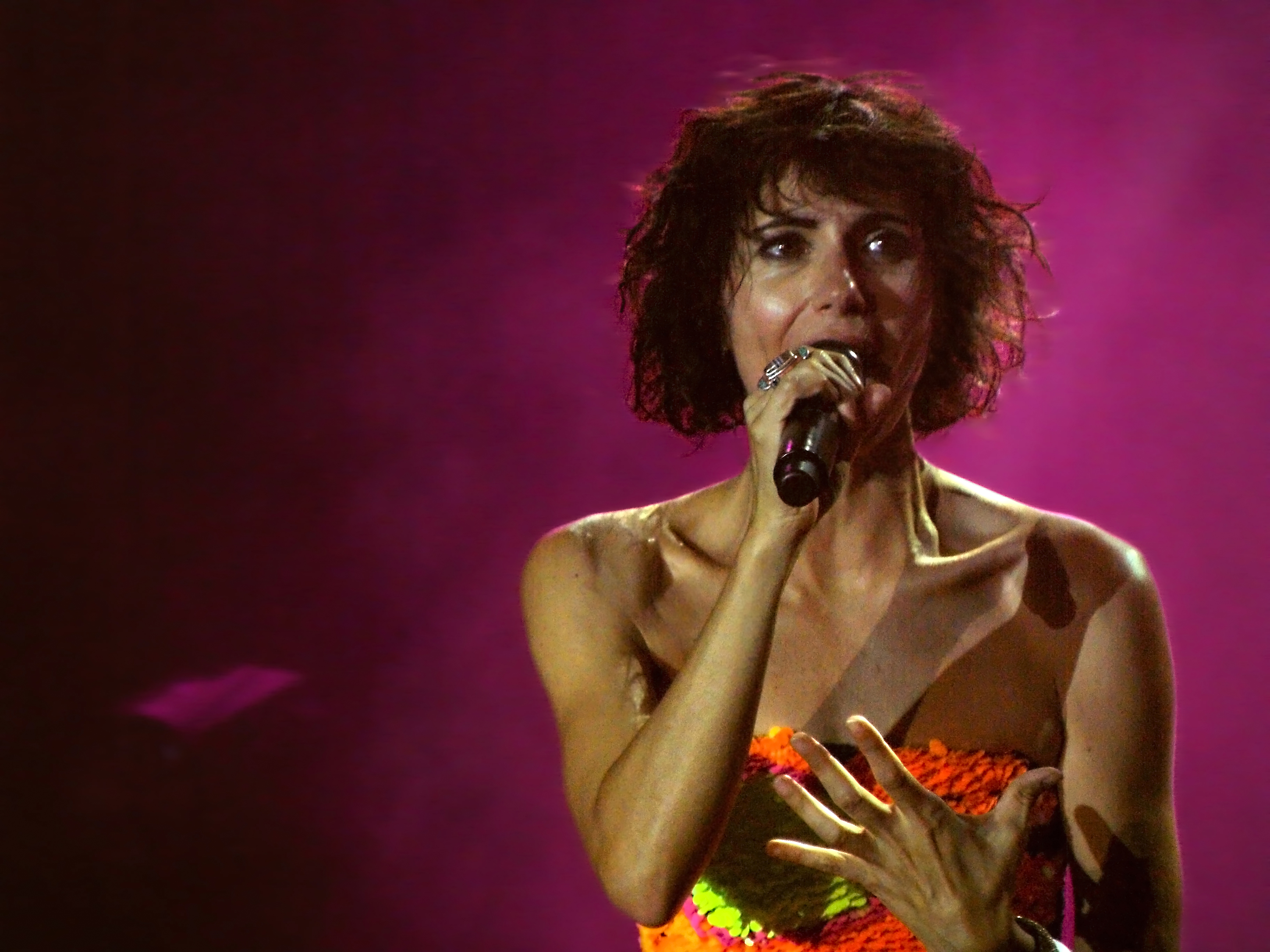
A cover of the song performed by Giorgia was featured on the soundtrack of 1999 Vanzina brothers film with the same title.

The song, in its original version performed by Mina, first appears in the 1960 film Appuntamento a Ischia, directed by Mario Mattoli. It then appears in the 1961 film Girl with a Suitcase, directed by Valerio Zurlini, during a scene in which Romolo, performed by Riccardo Garrone, tries to kiss Aida (Claudia Cardinale).

In 1990, the Italian version appeared on the soundtrack of Martin Scorsese's Goodfellas, though many sources list the English title. Dolce & Gabbana brought in Scorsese to direct its 2013 advertisement featuring Scarlett Johansson and Matthew McCanaughey, as a commercial for its perfume "The One."

Another version of the song, performed by Giorgia, was chosen as the soundtrack of a 1999 film by Carlo Vanzina and Enrico Vanzina, titled after the song. The song features heavily in the 2024 TV series Ripley.

The track "Ragazzo fortunato" by Italian singer and rapper Jovanotti, included in his 1992 album Lorenzo 1992, references the song in the line "Se io fossi capace scriverei 'Il cielo in una stanza'" (English: "If I had the talent, I would write 'Il cielo in una stanza'").

Singer-songwriter Max Gazzé refers to it in his 2007 hit song "Il solito sesso." He sings as a man who has met a woman at a party the night before, but she's already in a relationship. He calls her at 2 a.m. to ask to see her again, and declare his willingness to fight her partner to win her affection. It seems clear, however, that all he wants is a one-night stand. "Sai, qualcosa tipo 'cielo in una stanza'/ È quello che ho provato prima in tua presenza." English translation, "You know, something like 'Heaven in a room'/ That's what I felt earlier in your presence."

Singer-songwriter Francesco Gabbani references it in his 2020 hit "Viceversa" that he sang to represent Italy in Eurovision: "È la paura dietro all'arroganza/ È tutto l'universo chiuso in una stanza/ È l'abbondanza dentro alla mancanza/ Ti amo e basta/ It's the fear behind arrogance/ It's all the universe closed in a room/ It's the abundance within lack/ I just love you."

== Track listing ==
- 7" single – Italdisc MH 61
1. "Il cielo in una stanza" (Gino Paoli)
2. "La notte" (Franco Franchi, Gian Franco Reverberi)

== Re-recordings and cover versions ==
=== Other versions recorded by Mina ===
Mina recorded several versions of the song. In 1969, she included a new recording of "Il cielo in una stanza" on I discorsi, released under her own label PDU, while 1988 album Oggi ti amo di più features a new version performed with pianist Renato Sellani. An English-language version of the single, titled "This World We Love In", was released as a single by Mina herself, peaking at number 90 on the US Billboard Hot 100. Mina also recorded it in Spanish, under the title "El cielo en casa", and German, with the title "Wenn du an wunder glaubst".

=== Cover versions ===
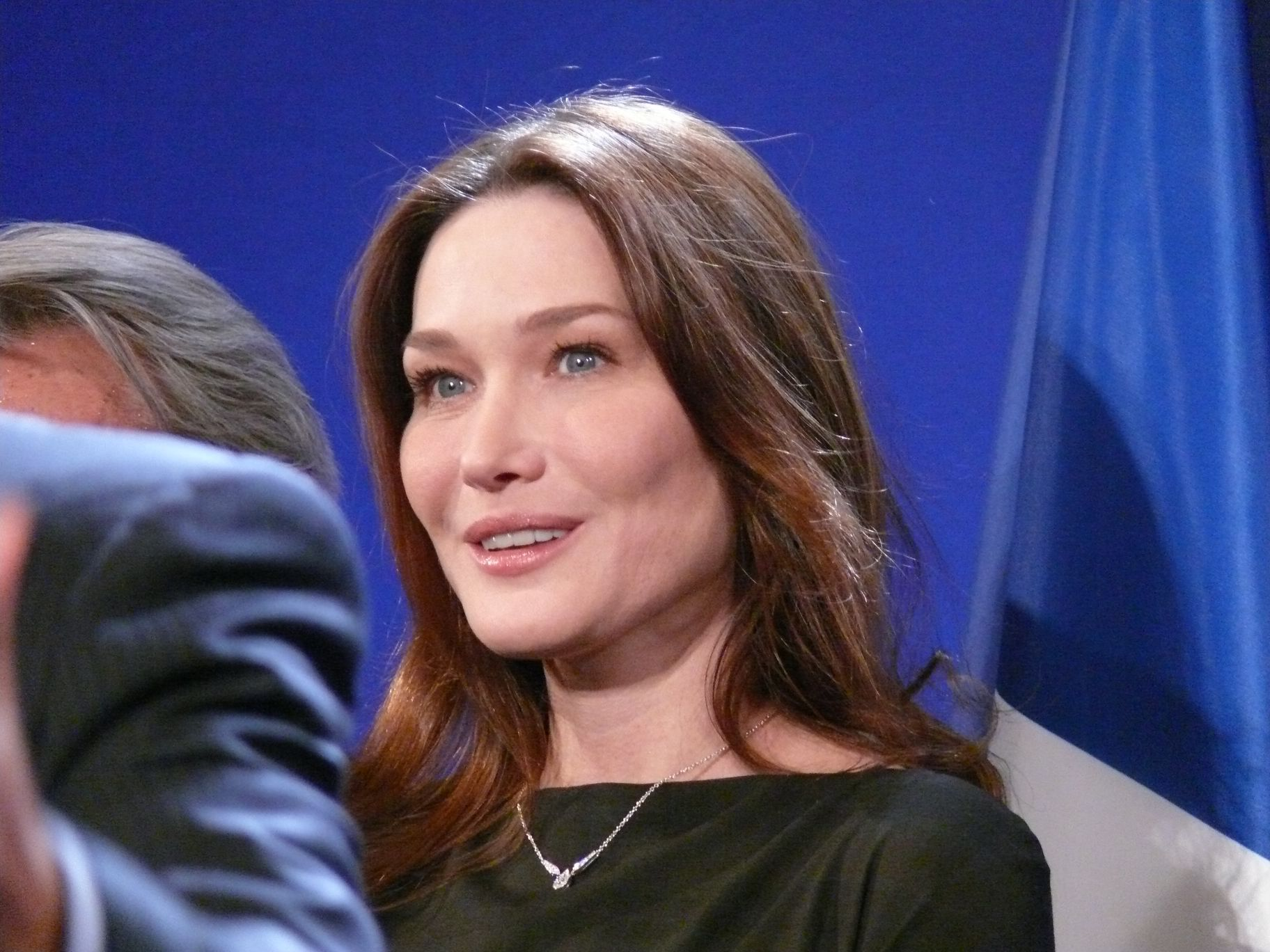
Italian-French singer-songwriter and former model Carla Bruni recorded the song in French for her 2003 debut album, and she re-recorded it as a duet with Gino Paoli in 2009.

The song was covered by several Italian and international artists. Gino Paoli recorded a new version of his own song during the same year of its first release. The song was also released as a single by Paoli, including the track "Però ti voglio bene" as a B-side. Paoli later re-recorded the song with Ennio Morricone. In 1971, Paoli included a new version of the song, arranged by Giampiero Boneschi and produced by Alberto Martinelli, in his album Rileggendo vecchie lettere d'amore, released by Durium Records. Finally, Paoli performed the song under a new arranged by Peppe Vessicchio.

The English-language version of the song was also recorded by Connie Francis in her 1963 album Connie Francis Sings Modern Italian Hits. In 1976, Italian singer Franco Simone included his own version of the song in the album Il poeta con la chitarra. The track was released as a 7" single in 1977, with the B-side "Sarà". Ornella Vanoni included a cover of the song in her 1980 album Oggi le canto così, vol. 2: Paoli e Tenco.

In 1999, Giorgia recorded the song for the soundtrack of the movie with the same title, directed by Carlo Vanzina and Enrico Vanzina. The recording was also included in the album Girasole, released during the same year. Three years later, Franco Battiato covered the song for his album Fleurs 3. In 2003, Italian-French singer and former model Carla Bruni recorded a French version of the song, titled "Le ciel dans une chambre" and adapted by Bruni herself, for her debut album Quelqu'un m'a dit. Bruni later re-recorded the song as a duet with Gino Paoli, which was featured in his compilation album Senza fine, released in 2009 to celebrate his 50th year of career.

In 2009 Noemi featured "Il cielo in una stanza" in her self-titled debut EP, while Morgan included both the Italian-language version and the English-language version of the song in his album Italian Songbook Vol. 1. American singer-songwriter Mike Patton also covered the Italian-language version of the song for his 2010 album Mondo cane.

In 2011, Italian singer Giusy Ferreri performed the song live during the 61st Sanremo Music Festival, during the third night of the show, in which each competing act was asked to sing a popular Italian song with the aim to celebrate the 150th anniversary of the Italian unification. Her version of the song was also featured both in the compilation album Nata per unire, gathering studio recordings of the songs performed during the night, and as a bonus track in her album Il mio universo.

The English singer-songwriter Nick Mulvey included a version of the song on his 2017 album "Wake Up Now" under the title "Infinite Trees", after the line "Ma alberi, alberi infiniti".

In 2018 it was arranged for the performance "The Sky in a Room" by the artist Ragnar Kjartansson. Italian native speakers say that "Heaven in a Room" would have been a more faithful translation for the sense of the words.

== Charts ==
=== Weekly charts ===
Chart (1960)	Peak position
Italy (Musica e dischi)	1
US Billboard Hot 100	90

==== Version featuring Renato Sellani ====
Chart (1988)	Peak position
Italy Airplay (Music & Media)	3

== Certifications ==
Region	Certification	Certified units/sales
Italy (FIMI) Since 2009	Gold	50,000^{‡}
^{‡} Sales+streaming figures based on certification alone.
