= Piero Soffici =

Italian composer and conductor (1920–2004)

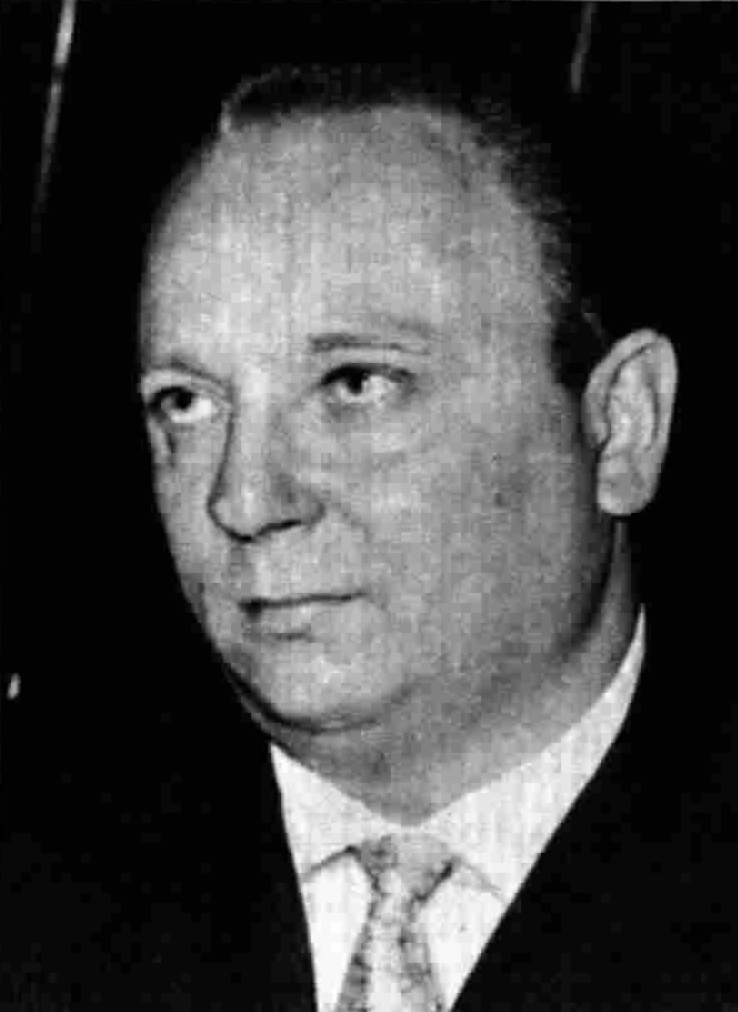
- Soffici in 1959
- Born: 28 July 1920; Rovinj, Croatia
- Died: 4 May 2004 (aged 83); Milan, Italy
- Occupation: Composer

Pietro "Piero" Soffici (28 July 1920 – 4 May 2004) was an Italian composer, arranger and conductor.

== Life and career ==
Born in Rovinj, at the time part of the Kingdom of Italy with the name Rovigno, Soffici graduated from the conservatory in violin, harmony and composition. After serving as bandleader in ballrooms and as member of several radio orchestras, in the 1950s he formed his own orchestra.

Known for his compositional eclecticism, Soffici composed many hits, including Mina's "Stessa spiaggia, stesso mare" and "Un buco nella sabbia", Caterina Caselli's "Perdono" and "Cento Giorni", Adriano Celentano's "Pitagora". In 1960, he won the Zecchino d'Oro with the song "Caro Gesù Bambino", which was later covered by numerous artists including Frankie Avalon, Andrea Bocelli, Teddy Reno, Don Marino Barreto Jr. and Gloria Christian. He took part in several editions of the Sanremo Music Festival, both as a songwriter and a conductor; among the hit songs he launched in the festival were Gene Pitney's "La rivoluzione" and Massimo Ranieri's "Quando l'amore diventa poesia". He also composed songs for Gino Paoli, Johnny Dorelli, Rita Pavone, Iva Zanicchi, Dik Dik, Dori Ghezzi, Orietta Berti, Carmen Villani, Achille Togliani, Tony Renis, Rocky Roberts, Cocky Mazzetti and Ghigo.

Soffici died on 4 May 2004, at the age of 83. He was the father of singer-songwriter Roberto Soffici.

== Discography ==
Albums

- 1975 - Sax Explosion (Variety, RLV-ST 90501)
- 1977 - I successi del 27º festival di Sanremo '77 (Variety, RLV-ST 90538)
- 1978 - Mi sono innamorato di te – Un sax in discoteca (Variety, RLV-ST 90547)
