= Jenny Luna =

Italian singer (born 1931)

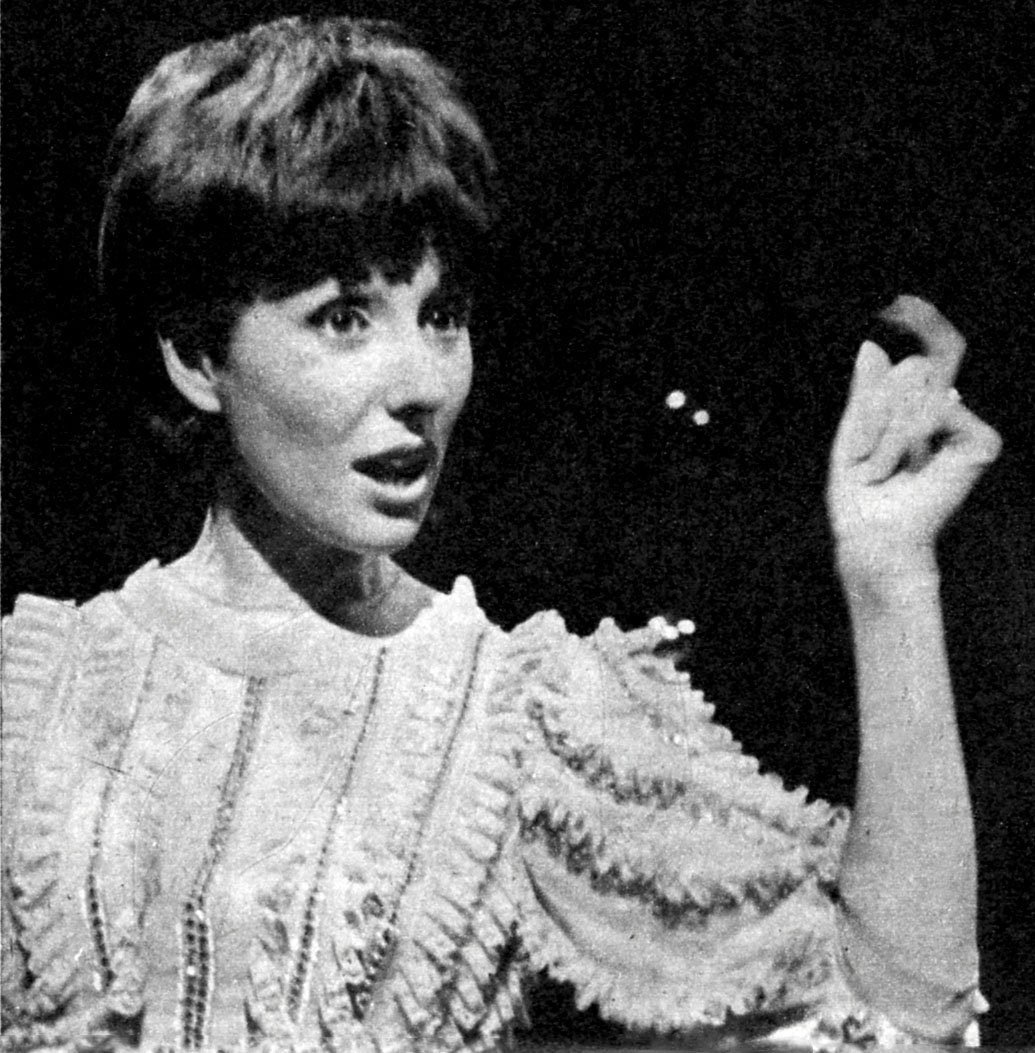
Jenny Luna in 1962

Maria Clotilde Troili (born 27 March 1931 in Rome), known professionally as Jenny Luna, is an Italian singer who was popular in the 1960s and 1970s.
