= Gianni Meccia =

Italian composer and singer-songwriter (1931–2024)

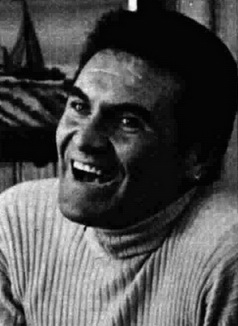
- Meccia in Radiocorriere magazine (1975)
- Born: 2 June 1931; Ferrara, Kingdom of Italy
- Died: 9 April 2024 (aged 92)
- Occupation: Singer-songwriter

Giovanni "Gianni" Meccia (2 June 1931 – 9 April 2024) was an Italian composer, singer-songwriter, record producer and actor. He was often associated with Jimmy Fontana.

== Life and career ==
Born in Ferrara, in 1950 Meccia moved to Rome to pursue an acting career, eventually only getting some bit roles in some RAI TV series. An autodidact guitarist specialized in composing black humorous and nonsense songs, he was first noted by lyricist Franco Migliacci and later by Mario Riva, and had his breakout in 1959 with the song "Odio tutte le vecchie signore", which he launched in the Riva's popular music show Il Musichiere. In 1960 he reached the height of his popularity thanks to the hits "Il barattolo" (arranged by Ennio Morricone) and "Il pullover". In 1961 he took part in the eleventh edition of the Sanremo Music Festival with "Patatina", and had a good success with "Cha-cha dell'impiccato", a duet with his friend and frequent collaborator Jimmy Fontana.

In the following years Meccia gradually focused on composing, writing songs for Mina (the hit "Folle banderuola"), Domenico Modugno, Patty Pravo, Rita Pavone, Nilla Pizzi, Cher ("Ma piano - per non svegliarti"); he got his major success as a composer with the song "Il mondo", brought to success by Jimmy Fontana. In 1970 he co-founded with Bruno Zambrini and directed the record label Pull, with whom he launched the career of the glam-pop group I Cugini di Campagna. In the early 1980s the label closed and Meccia reprised his singing career as a member of the group Superquattro, together with Fontana, Nico Fidenco and Riccardo Del Turco.

Meccia died on 9 April 2024, at the age of 92. His death wasn't made public until August of that year.

== Filmography ==
=== Actor ===
- Moana, Virgin of the Amazon (1955)
- Ragazzi del Juke-Box (1959) as Gianni
- Nel blu dipinto di blu (1959) as Plainclothesman
- Howlers in the Dock (1960) as Gianni aka Satana
- Io bacio... tu baci (1961) as The Singer with a grey Pullover
- Eighteen in the Sun (1962)
- Canzoni in... bikini (1963) as Himself
- Djurado (1969) as Ricky - Guitar Player (uncredited) (final film role)

=== Composer ===
- Io bacio... tu baci (1961, "Diavolo", "Patatina")
- Girl with a Suitcase (1961, "Folle banderuola")
- Sentivano uno strano, eccitante, pericoloso puzzo di dollari (1973)

=== Singer ===
- Io bacio... tu baci (1961, "Patatina" and "Cha cha cha dell'impiccato")
- Of Wayward Love (1962, "Sole magico di luglio")
