= Claudio Villa =

Italian singer and actor (1926–1987)

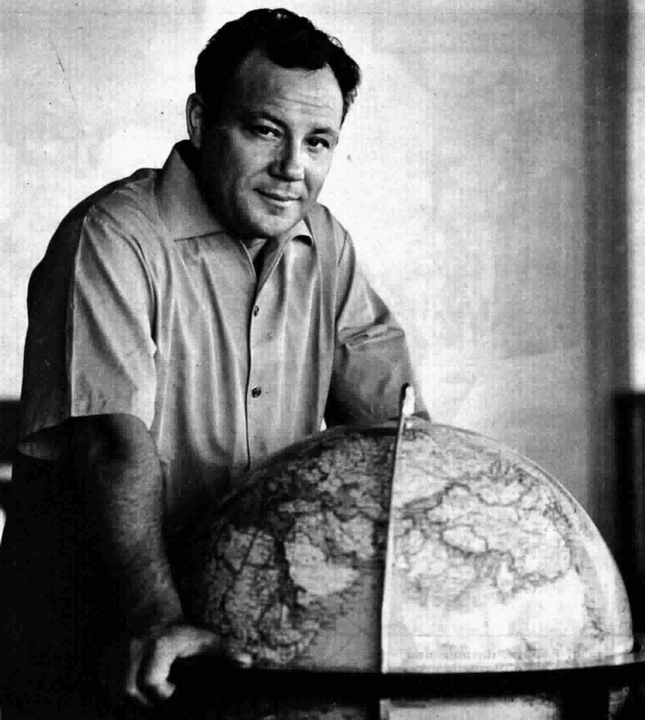
- Villa in 1965
- Born: Claudio Pica; 1 January 1926; Rome, Kingdom of Italy
- Died: 7 February 1987 (aged 61); Padua, Italy
- Occupations: Singer; operatic tenor; actor
- Years active: 1932–1987
- Height: 1.62 m (5 ft 4 in)
- Spouses: Miranda Bonansea (m. 1952; div. 1962) Patrizia Baldi (m. 1975)

Claudio Villa (born Claudio Pica; 1 January 1926 – 7 February 1987) was an Italian singer and actor. He recorded over 3000 songs, sold 45 million records, and appeared in 25 musicals during his career.

== Biography ==
Claudio Villa was born Claudio Pica in the Trastevere quarter of Rome in 1926. His parents named him after Claudio Serio. Many songs made famous by Villa, like "'A tazza 'e cafè", were recorded for the Fonit Cetra label.

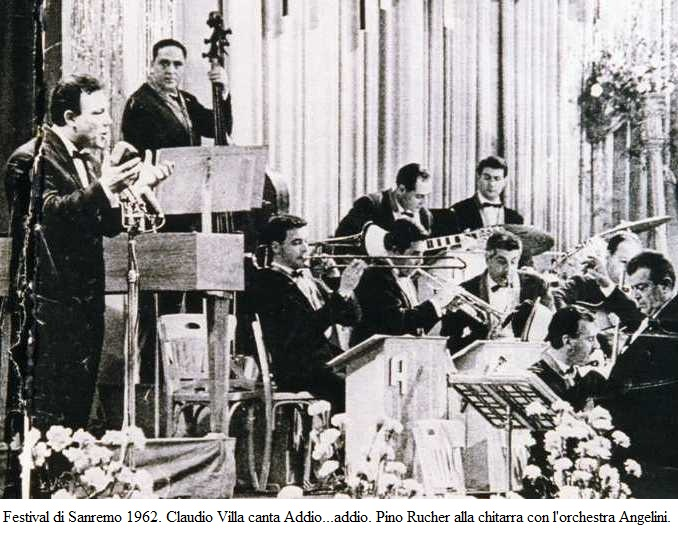
Villa performing "Addio, addio" at the Sanremo Music Festival 1962. In the lower right corner: orchestra conductor Cinico Angelini. At the top centre: Pino Rucher at the guitar and Pierino Munari at the drums.

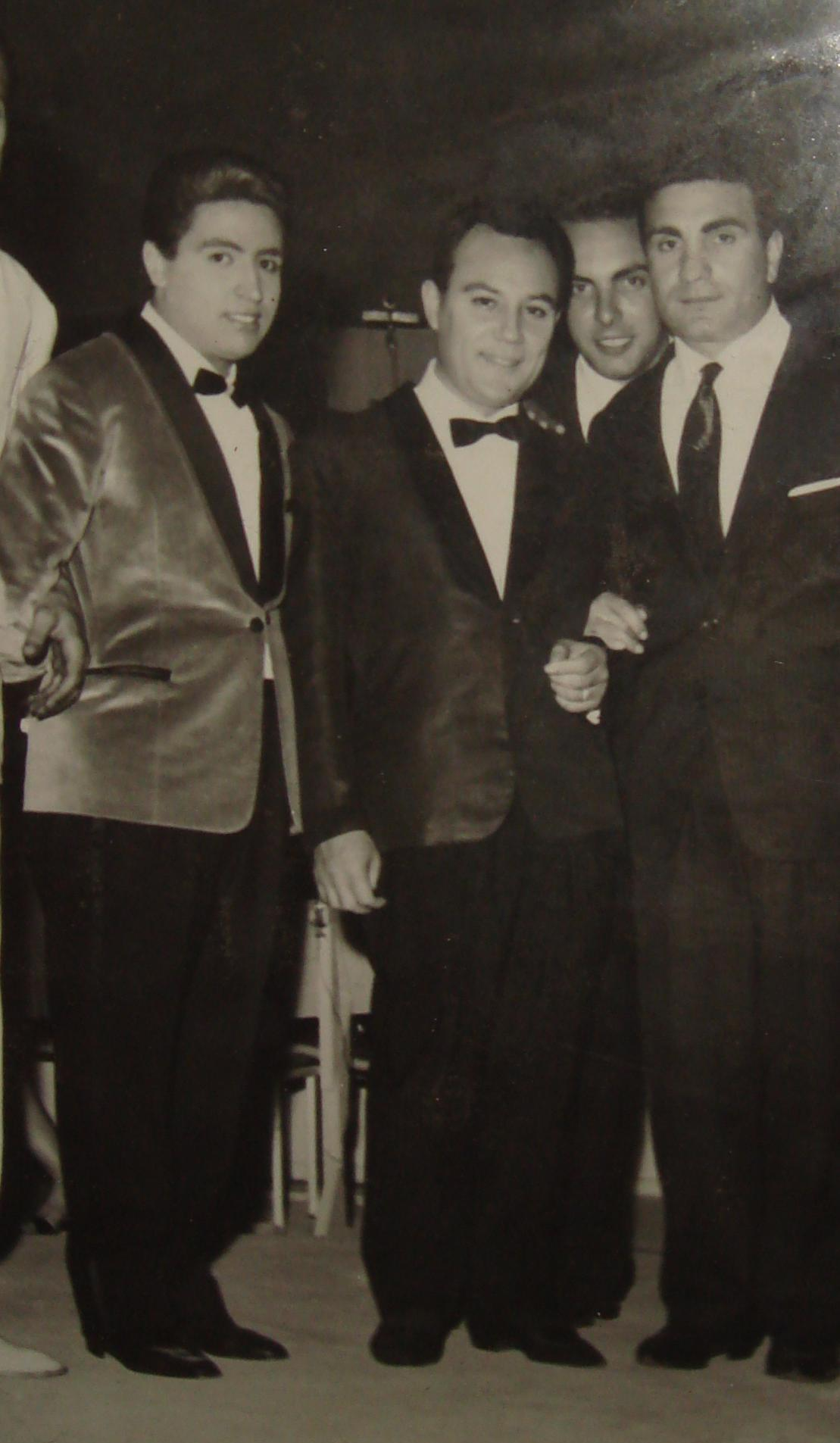
Villa with Mario Trevi (left) in 1962

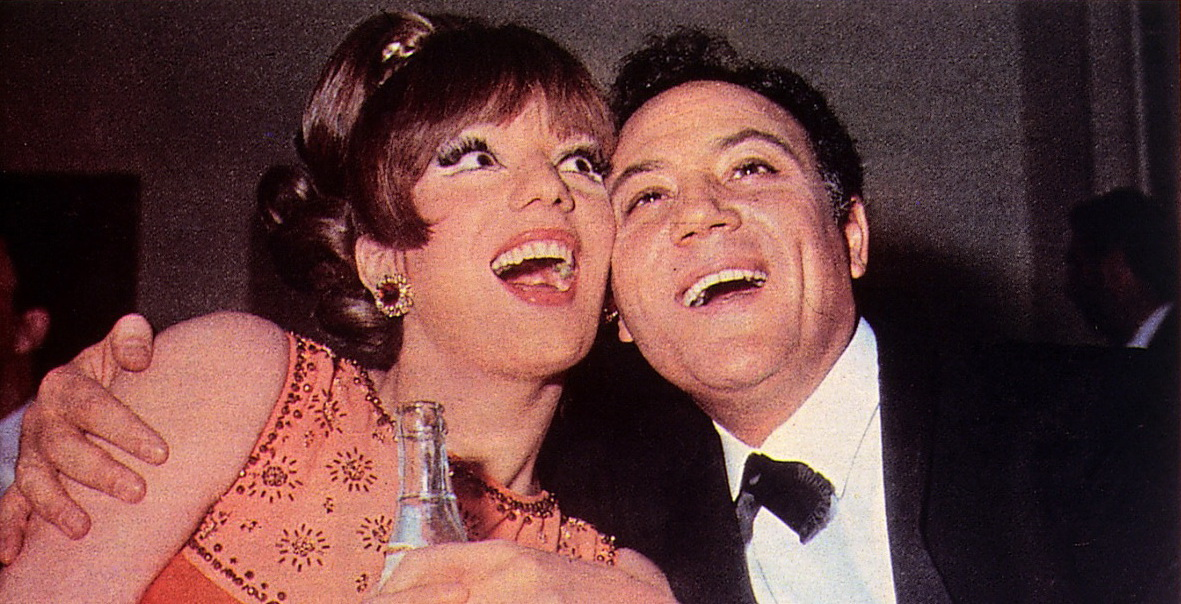
Villa and Iva Zanicchi celebrating their joint victory at the Sanremo Music Festival 1967

Together with Domenico Modugno Villa holds the record for the most wins at the Sanremo Music Festival, where he won the competition in 1955, 1957, 1962 and 1967. In 1963, he won the Festival di Napoli with the song "Jamme ja". He also sang at another Italian music competition, Canzonissima, a television event shown on RAI from 1956 to 1974. He won Canzonissima in 1964 with "'O sole mio" and in 1966 with "Granada". He competed in the Eurovision Song Contest in 1962 with "Addio, addio" and came in ninth; in 1967, he was again at Eurovision with "Non andare più lontano", finishing eleventh. His compositions "Stornelli amorosi" and "Addio sogni di gloria" featured on the soundtrack of Robert De Niro and Martin Scorsese's 1973 film, Mean Streets, thus gaining him a broader appreciative international audience.

In 1957, he was subjected to a curious "trial" by the TV Sorrisi e Canzoni magazine, after one of his declarations was deemed presumptuous and immodest, in which the public was asked to vote for guilt or acquittal. He was acquitted. The same procedure was repeated in 1960, and from the pages of the magazine, he received a defensive harangue by Pier Paolo Pasolini, who took sides for the singer's acquittal. He was acquitted with the vote of 138,225 readers.

In 1981, Claudio Villa's name was included in a member list found in police raids of properties owned by Licio Gelli, showing Villa's membership in the clandestine neofascist criminal organization Propaganda Due.

His death in 1987 by a heart attack was announced live by the host Pippo Baudo during the last night of that year's Sanremo Festival. His tomb, surrounded by bas-relief and wall-paintings made in occasion of 20th anniversary of his death, is located in San Sebastiano cemetery in Rocca di Papa, near Rome, where he lived for many years with his family. On his gravestone are the words "Vita sei bella, morte fai schifo" ("Life, you are beautiful; death, you stink").

== Legacy ==
The singer was largely unknown in North America until the 1996 film Big Night was released, co-directed by Stanley Tucci and Campbell Scott. The film won international acclaim. The soundtrack includes three Claudio Villa songs: "Stornelli amorosi", "La strada del bosco" and "Tic Ti, Tic Ta". According to the liner notes accompanying the CD, "Stanley grew up listening to vocalists such as Carlo Buti and Claudio Villa, huge names in Italy but little known here. Villa is a master of the stornello, a traditional song style that we thought had just the right, delicate feeling for the film's opening. But we and co-director Campbell Scott were further amazed by Villa when in the editing room, we chanced upon his boisterous 'Tic Ti, Tic Ta' and his shamelessly romantic 'La strada del bosco'."

In 1976, however, Villa did cross the Atlantic for a tour of eastern Canada, notably in Montreal, Toronto and Ottawa. He also travelled to perform in New York. In Montreal, he played three consecutive nights at Cinema Riviera. He performed with his regular band except for the guitarist and bassist who were local musicians. The former was a well-known Italian Montreal musician named Franco Barbuto.

== Selected filmography ==
- Song of Spring (1951)
- Serenata amara (1952)
- Solo per te Lucia (1952)
- Love Song (1954)
- Ore 10: lezione di canto (1955)
- Primo applauso (1956)
- Serenate per 16 bionde (1957)
- L'amore nasce a Roma (1958)
- Fountain of Trevi (1960)
