= 1961 in British television =

This is a list of British television related events from 1961.

== Events ==
=== January ===
- 1 January – Dechrau Canu, Dechrau Canmol, featuring congregational Christian singing in the Welsh language, debuts on BBC Television. The series will still be on the air, now being broadcast on S4C, 60 years later.
- 5 January – Hanna-Barbera's cartoon series The Flintstones debuts in the ITV London region. Other regions begin broadcasting the show later, with ITV North on 31 August.
- 7 January – The Avengers premieres on ITV.

=== February ===
- 3 February – The final live episode of Coronation Street is aired. From now on all episodes are prerecorded. The next live transmission will not occur until 8 December 2000.

=== March ===
- 6 March – Coronation Street begins airing on Monday and Wednesday evenings at 7:30pm. Previously, it has been transmitted on Wednesday and Friday evenings at 7pm.
- 18 March – The BBC broadcasts the 6th Eurovision Song Contest from Cannes. It is won by Luxembourg with "Nous les amoureux" sung by Jean-Claude Pascal. The UK entry places second for the third consecutive contest, with "Are You Sure?" sung by male duo The Allisons.
- March – An edition of ABC's Sunday evening religious programme The Sunday Break features a performance of the Passion Play "A Man Dies", depicting Jesus Christ dressed in a pair of jeans.

=== April ===
- 4 April – Southern launches a weeknight 30-minute regional news programme called Day By Day.
- 29 April – Westward Television, the first ITV franchise for South West England, goes on air.

=== June ===
- 9 June – The Radio Ham episode of Hancock is first transmitted on BBC TV.
- 23 June – The Blood Donor episode of Hancock is first transmitted on BBC TV.

=== September ===
- 1 September – Border Television, the ITV franchise for the English-Scottish Border and Isle of Man, goes on air.
- 30 September – Grampian Television, the ITV franchise for North East Scotland, goes on air.

=== October ===
- 1 October – Songs of Praise, featuring Christian congregations singing hymns, debuts on BBC Television, the first programme being hosted by Tabernacle Chapel, Cardiff. The series will still be on the air sixty years later.
- 2 October – Points of View, featuring the letters of viewers offering praise, criticism and comments on the television of recent weeks, debuts on BBC Television. The series will still be on the air sixty years later.
- 12 October – ITV debuts the Morecambe and Wise show Two of a Kind, which runs until 1968.

=== December ===
- 15 December – The BBC broadcasts the first Comedy Playhouse. The series broadcasts a series of one-off unrelated sitcoms. Over the next fourteen years, the series will air the pilot episodes of many comedies, including Steptoe and Son, Till Death Us Do Part, The Liver Birds, Up Pompeii!, Are You Being Served? and Last of the Summer Wine.
- 25 December – Debut of a Walt Disney-themed clips-based television specials on the BBC. Broadcast on Bank holidays as well as Christmas time, it will run until 1998. Initially known as The World of Walt Disney, its name would be changed to Disney Time in 1964.

=== Unknown ===
- Southern Television launches the UK's first localised news opt-out when it launches a news service for south east England from its new studios in Dover.

== Debuts ==
=== BBC Television Service/BBC TV ===
- 15 January – Paradise Walk (1961)
- 27 January – The House Under the Water (1961)
- 11 February – The Valiant Years (1961)
- 3 March – Rashomon (1961)
- 25 March – Ask Mr. Pastry (1961)
- 4 April – They Met in a City (1961)
- 9 April – Rob Roy (1961)
- 14 April – Amelia (1961)
- 30 April – Ask Anne (1961)
- 18 May – Court of Mystery (1961)
- 4 June – Triton (1961)
- 16 June – Magnolia Street (1961)
- 7 June – Moody In... (1961)
- 20 June – Walk a Crooked Mile (1961)
- 2 July – Hurricane (1961)
- 28 July – Storyboard (1961)
- 1 August – Our Mister Ambler (1961)
- 14 September – The Randy Dandy (1961)
- 24 September – Stranger on the Shore (1961)
- 1 October – Songs of Praise (1961–present)
- 2 October – Points of View (1961–1971, 1979–present)
- 3 October – A for Andromeda (1961)
- 5 October – You Can't Win (1961)
- 6 October – The Rag Trade (1961–1963, 1977–1978)
- 3 November – Anna Karenina (1961)
- 4 November – Gamble for a Throne (1961)
- 16 November
  - The Seven Faces of Jim (1961–1963)
  - Jacks and Knaves (1961)
- 19 November – The Charlie Chester Music Hall (1961–1962)
- 21 November – The Escape of R.D.7 (1961)
- 22 November – A Chance of Thunder (1961)
- 3 December – Vice Versa: A Lesson to Fathers (1961)
- 10 December – Gilbert and Sullivan (1961)
- 15 December
  - Comedy Playhouse (1961–1974)
  - Where the Difference Begins (1961)
- 25 December – Disney Time (1961–1998)

=== ITV ===
- 7 January – The Avengers (1961–1969)
- 17 January – The Blackness (1961)
- 25 January – Jango (1961)
- 28 January – Supercar (1961–1962)
- 29 January – The Mask of the Clown (1961)
- 1 February – Survival (1961–2001)
- 12 February – Happily Ever After (1961–1964)
- 5 March – Pathfinders to Venus (1961)
- 11 March – The Arthur Askey Show (1961)
- 14 March – A Brother for Joe (1961)
- 19 March – Drama 61-67 (1961–1967)
- 29 March – Tales of Mystery (1961–1963)
- 1 April – Thank Your Lucky Stars (1961–1966)
- 29 April – If the Crown Fits (1961)
- 30 April – The Secret of the Nubian Tomb (1961)
- 15 May – Three Live Wires (1961)
- 26 June – Harpers West One (1961–1963)
- 28 June – Family Solicitor (1961)
- 11 August – Top Secret (1961–1962)
- 24 August – Echo Four Two (1961)
- 9 September
  - Ghost Squad (1961–1964)
  - The Jo Stafford Show (1961)
  - Winning Widows (1961–1962)
- 11 September – Home Tonight (1961)
- 12 September – Tuesday Rendezvous (1961–1963)
- 14 September – Hamlet (1961)
- 15 September – Colonel Trumper's Private War (1961)
- 22 September – Frontier Drums (1961)
- 24 September – Plateau of Fear (1961)
- 24 September – Call Oxbridge 2000 (1961–1962)
- 12 October – Two of a Kind (1961–1968)
- 31 October – Thirty Minute Theatre (1961–1965)
- 12 November – Sir Francis Drake (1961–1962)
- 24 December – Journey of a Lifetime (1961–1962)
- Unknown
  - One Step Beyond (1959–1961)
  - The Pursuers (1961–1962)
  - Tempo (1961–1968)

== Continuing television shows ==
=== 1920s ===
- BBC Wimbledon (1927–1939, 1946–2019, 2021–2024)

=== 1930s ===
- Trooping the Colour (1937–1939, 1946–2019, 2023–present)
- The Boat Race (1938–1939, 1946–2019, 2021–present)
- BBC Cricket (1939, 1946–1999, 2020–2024)

=== 1950s ===
- Andy Pandy (1950–1970, 2002–2005)
- Come Dancing (1950–1998)
- Watch with Mother (1952–1975)
- Rag, Tag and Bobtail (1953–1965)
- The Good Old Days (1953–1983)
- Panorama (1953–present)
- Picture Book (1955–1965)
- Sunday Night at the London Palladium (1955–1967, 1973–1974)
- Take Your Pick! (1955–1968, 1992–1998)
- Double Your Money (1955–1968)
- Dixon of Dock Green (1955–1976)
- Crackerjack (1955–1970, 1972–1984, 2020–2021)
- ITV Wimbledon (1956–1968)
- Opportunity Knocks (1956–1978, 1987–1990)
- This Week (1956–1978, 1986–1992)
- Armchair Theatre (1956–1974)
- What the Papers Say (1956–2008)
- The Sky at Night (1957–present)
- Blue Peter (1958–present)
- Grandstand (1958–2007)
- Face to Face (1959–1962)
- Noggin the Nog (1959–1965, 1970, 1979–1982)

=== 1960s ===
- Sykes and A... (1960–1965)
- The Flintstones (1960–1966)
- Coronation Street (1960–present)
- Mess Mates (1960–1962)

== Ending this year ==
- All Your Own (1952–1961)
- Hancock's Half Hour (1956–1961)
- The Army Game (1957–1961)
- Danger Man (1960–1961, 1964–1968)
- Saturday Playhouse (1958–1961)
- Deadline Midnight (1960–1961)
- Torchy the Battery Boy (1960–1961)
- The Jo Stafford Show (1961)

== Births ==
- 1 January
  - Fiona Phillips, journalist, broadcaster and television presenter
  - Mark Wingett, British actor
- 12 January – Simon Russell Beale, British actor
- 26 January – Mark Urban, journalist and military historian
- 20 February – Imogen Stubbs, British actress
- 21 February – Ross King, television presenter, actor and author
- 10 April – Nicky Campbell, radio and television presenter
- 14 April – Robert Carlyle, Scottish actor
- 18 April – Jane Leeves, English actress
- 20 April
  - Nicholas Lyndhurst, actor
  - Paul Usher, actor
- 2 May – Phil Vickery, British celebrity chef
- 6 May – Pippa Haywood, English actress
- 14 May – Tim Roth, English actor
- 30 May – Harry Enfield, English comedian
- 24 June – Iain Glen, Scottish actor
- 25 June – Ricky Gervais, English comedian
- 27 June – Meera Syal, British comedian and writer
- 5 July – Gareth Jones, television presenter
- 17 July – Jeremy Hardy, English comedian and radio panelist (died 2019)
- 5 August – Janet McTeer, British actress
- 7 August – Brian Conley, comedian, television presenter, singer and actor
- 16 August – Saskia Reeves, British actress
- 18 August – Huw Edwards, journalist and news presenter
- 27 August – Mark Curry, television presenter
- 15 September – Colin McFarlane, actor and voice actor
- 24 September – Jack Dee, actor and comedian
- 7 October – Simon McCoy, BBC newsreader
- 10 October – Martin Kemp, musician and actor
- 26 October – Linda Barker, interior designer and television presenter
- 27 October – Joanna Scanlan, actress and television writer
- 9 November – Jill Dando, television newsreader (murdered 1999)
- 18 November – Steven Moffat, Scottish screenwriter
- 27 November – Samantha Bond, British actress
- 28 November – Martin Clunes, actor
- 11 December – Marco Pierre White, British chef and restaurateur
- 12 December – Sarah Sutton, British actress
- 19 December – Matthew Waterhouse, British actor
- 23 December – Carol Smillie, television presenter

== Deaths ==
- 28 September – Michael Shepley, actor, aged 53
- 12 October – Jack Livesey, actor, aged 60

== See also ==
- 1961 in British music
- 1961 in British radio
- 1961 in the United Kingdom
- List of British films of 1961
