= Say Wonderful Things =

Say Wonderful Things may refer to:

- Say Wonderful Things (song), the UK Eurovision entry sung by Ronnie Carroll in 1963, popularized in the US by Patti Page
- Say Wonderful Things (album), a 1963 Patti Page album containing the song
