= Frank Price (politician) =

Labour Party politician

Sir Frank Leslie Price DL (1922 – 29/30 December 2017) was a Labour Party politician and former Lord Mayor of Birmingham. He was raised in the slums of Hockley, Birmingham, and briefly joined the Communist Party of Great Britain. Price was elected to Birmingham City Council in 1949, representing part of Sandwell for the Labour Party. He chaired the public works committee from 1953 to 1959, during which time he worked closely with Herbert Manzoni on development projects including the Inner Ring Road, Middle Ring Road and the first Bull Ring shopping centre. He became an alderman in 1958 and the following year switched to chairing the council's parks committee. In this role he introduced new entertainment events to the city's parks, including successful Tulip Festivals.

Price also worked on the creation of the new town of Telford and in promoting co-operation between local authorities and education authorities on the provision of sports facilities. He was elected Lord Mayor in 1964 and was knighted in 1966, the same year he became leader of the Labour group on the council. Alongside his political work Price also worked for land developers on projects in Britain and the United States. From 1968 to 1984 he served as chairman of British Waterways, promoting restoration of the Ashton Canal and Peak Forest Canal. Price retired to Spain in the 1980s and died there.

== Early life ==
Price was born in 1922. His mother, Lucy, raised him and his three brothers in a series of back-to-back houses in the slums of Hockley, Birmingham. As a teenager Price was a keen boxer. He left school at the age of 14 and was briefly a member of the Communist Party of Great Britain.

== Birmingham City Council ==
=== Councillor ===
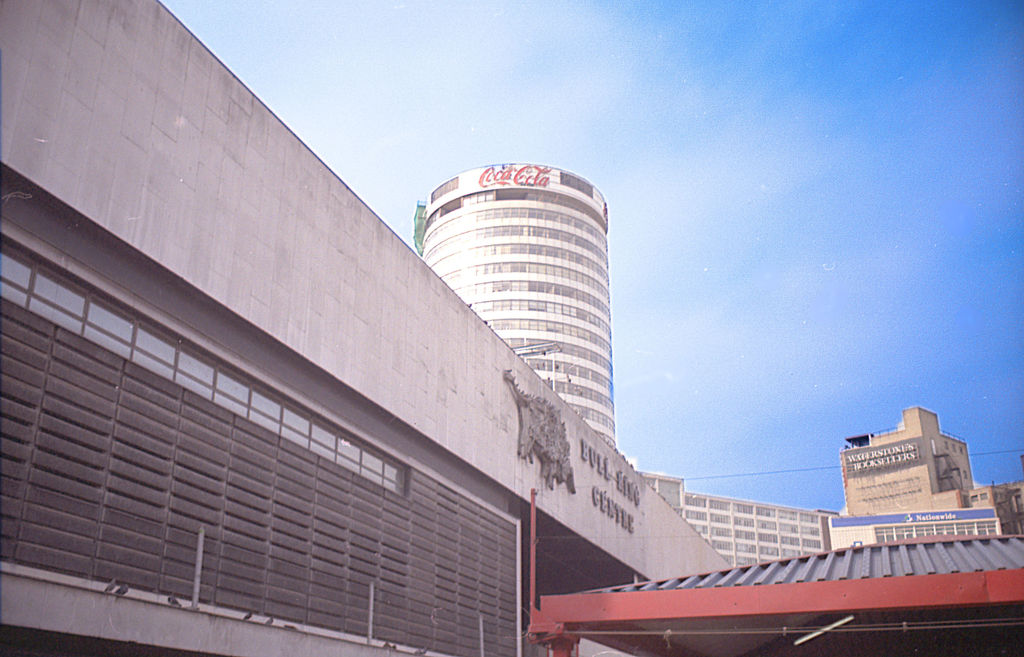
The Bull Ring

In 1949, at the age of 27, Price was elected as a Labour Party councillor to Birmingham City Council, representing the St Paul's ward in the Hockley district of the city. Price chaired the public works committee from 1953 to 1959 during which time he worked closely with the council's chief planning officer Herbert Manzoni. Price was closely associated with the planning and construction of the city's Inner Ring Road, Middle Ring Road and the first Bull Ring shopping centre. As Chairman, Price was involved in the planning of new council housing and worked with playwrights John English and Mollie Randle to establish the Midlands Arts Centre. Price advocated greater involvement of the working class in the arts and the Midland Arts Centre was intended to facilitate this.

=== Alderman ===
In 1958 Price was appointed an alderman for the Kings Norton ward, and continued in that role until 1974. He left the public works committee in 1959 to chair the parks committee. In this role Price led a revival of entertainment events in the city's parks including fireworks displays, music events and the Tulip Festival of 30 April to 14 May 1960. The latter was inspired by the Dutch Floriade 1960 event, celebrating the 400th anniversary of the arrival of tulip bulbs in that country. Price secured Dutch support to provide staff, cut flowers and bulbs and also placed an order for a hot air balloon display. Opposition from Conservative members, including a proposed motion to censure him for exceeding his power, was defeated when Price secured the support of Alderman Annie Wood, the Conservative leader on the parks committee. The Tulip Festival also featured open air theatre, a performance by Roy Castle (early in his career), a closing speech by Max Bygraves and a fireworks display. It was judged a success and attended by more than 500,000 people. The profits from the event paid for the installation of hot water showers at the city's rugby and football pitches. Price went on to run three more tulip festivals, leaving in a hot air balloon with Peter O’Toole at the close of one.

In the 1960s Price also managed, as chair of its development corporation, the establishment of the new town of Telford by the merger of Wellington, Oakengates, Madeley and Dawley. During Price's time Telford became the fastest-growing town in the country. Price was a supporter of devolution from central government to the regions. He was elected Lord Mayor of Birmingham in 1964.

Price became leader of the Labour group on the council shortly before the 1966 general election, replacing Harry Watton who had fallen ill. Price was made a knight bachelor in the 1966 Queen's Birthday Honours for "political and public services in Birmingham." This was conferred by Elizabeth II at Buckingham Palace on 1 November.

As Chairman of the West Midlands Sports Council Price called a conference of local authorities in January 1968 that led to a formal policy of local authorities and education authorities cooperating to provide sports facilities. These were to be made available for schools to use in the daytime and the community in the evenings, weekends and school holidays. The policy helped to increase participation in sport for those who left education at 16.

From 1971 to 1974 Price sat on the city council's NEC development committee, planning the construction of the National Exhibition Centre. Price stood down from the council in 1974 and, on 26 March of that year, was appointed an honorary alderman.

== Business career ==
During his time with Birmingham City Council Price also maintained some private business interests, which led to some criticism over potential conflicts of interest. He worked alongside former Field Marshal Claude Auchinleck at Murrayfield Developments to construct offices and shopping centres in London, northern England and New York. He later established Alexander Stevens and Company, headquartered in Birmingham, to construct developments across the United Kingdom including studios for Associated Television. Additionally Price served as head of Labour Party Properties, the party's own development organisation.

From July 1968 until June 1984 Price served as chairman of the board of British Waterways, a statutory corporation of the British government responsible for the management of most of the nation's canals and some other bodies of water. In this role Price became the longest-serving chairman of any British nationalised industry. As chairman Price promoted the successful restoration of the Ashton Canal and Peak Forest Canal, in North-West England, with local authorities. The Eastwood lock on the Sheffield and South Yorkshire Navigation is named after him.

== Personal life ==
Price was appointed deputy lieutenant for Worcestershire on 26 June 1970. This appointment was renewed on 24 June 1977. He resigned the appointment on 23 February 1984 but retained the right to the post nominals and uniform.

Price was married to Maisie, whom he divorced in the 1970s, and had one son. He moved to Mojácar in south-eastern Spain, in the 1980s. In 2002 Price published an autobiography, entitled Being There. In later years he suffered from Alzheimer's disease. According to the Birmingham Mail he died in a hospice near Almeria on 30 December 2017, but the minutes of a Birmingham City Council meeting state he died at his home in Spain on 29 December 2017, at the age of 95 years. He had left instructions that his body was to go to the University Hospital in Granada, however as it was New Years they could not receive it. He was cremated and his ashes scattered in a lake near his home at Los Gallardos (Mojacar) by his son.
