= 1961 in British music =

This is a summary of 1961 in music in the United Kingdom, including the official charts from that year.

== Summary ==
Popular music in the UK was still dominated by American acts. Skiffle and traditional jazz were still popular.

== Events ==
- 9 February – The Beatles at The Cavern Club: Lunchtime – The Beatles perform under this name at The Cavern Club for the first time following their return to Liverpool from Hamburg, George Harrison's first appearance at the venue.
- 18 March – The Allisons represent the UK in the Eurovision Song Contest, held at Cannes in France. They finish second with "Are You Sure?", a song the duo wrote themselves. The song sells a million copies and goes to number 2 in the official UK singles chart (#1 in some charts).
- 21 March – The Beatles at The Cavern Club: The Beatles – John, Paul, George and Stu – play the first of nearly 300 regular performances at The Cavern Club in Liverpool.
- June–July – Stu Sutcliffe leaves The Beatles to resume his art studies in Hamburg.
- 29 July – William Glock is now controller of music for the BBC and the Proms. One of his first commissions is of Symphonies, Op 46 by Elisabeth Lutyens, an indication of his modernistic sympathies.
- 21 August – The first complete opera performance – Mozart’s Don Giovanni in a production transferred from Glyndebourne – is given at the Proms.
- September – Myra Hess gives her last public concert, at London's Royal Festival Hall.
- 17 October – Former schoolfriends Mick Jagger and Keith Richards, later of The Rolling Stones, meet each other again by chance on Dartford railway station on the way to their respective colleges and discover their mutual taste for rock and roll.
- 9 November – The Beatles at The Cavern Club: Future manager Brian Epstein first sees The Beatles.
- 9 December – The Beatles play their first gig in the south of England, at Aldershot. Due to an advertising failure, only 18 people turn up. In the early hours of the following morning they play an impromptu set at a London club.
- William Alwyn sets up home with fellow-composer Doreen Carwithen, his former pupil, at Blythburgh in England.
- The Leeds International Pianoforte Competition is founded by Marion, Countess of Harewood and Fanny Waterman (first competition held in 1963).

== The Official UK Singles Chart ==
- See UK No.1 Hits of 1961

== Classical music: new works ==
- Malcolm Arnold – Symphony No. 5
- Benjamin Britten –
  - Cello Sonata
  - The National Anthem – arrangement
- Alun Hoddinott – Concerto for Piano, Winds and Percussion
- Nicholas Maw – Our Lady's Song
- Alan Rawsthorne – Concerto for Ten Instruments

== Opera ==
- Grace Williams – The Parlour

== Film and Incidental music ==
- Malcolm Arnold – Whistle Down the Wind, starring Hayley Mills, Bernard Lee and Alan Bates.
- Benjamin Frankel – The Curse of the Werewolf directed by Terence Fisher, starring Oliver Reed.
- Wilfred Josephs – Cash on Demand, starring Peter Cushing.

== Musical theatre ==
- 16 March – The London production of The Music Man opens at the Adelphi Theatre, starring Van Johnson, Patricia Lambert, Ruth Kettlewell and Dennis Waterman.
- 20 July – Stop the World – I Want to Get Off (Music, Lyrics and Book: Anthony Newley and Leslie Bricusse) opens at the Queen's Theatre; it runs for 485 performances.
- 3 August – Wildest Dreams (by Julian Slade) opens at the Vaudeville Theatre; it runs for 76 performances.
- 12 October – The London production of Do-Re-Mi opens at the Prince of Wales Theatre; it runs for 169 performances.
- London revival of Salad Days (Julian Slade), at Prince's Theatre
- The London production of The Sound of Music (Music: Richard Rodgers Lyrics: Oscar Hammerstein II Book: Howard Lindsay and Russel Crouse) opens at the Palace Theatre; it runs for 2385 performances.

== Musical films ==
- The Young Ones, starring Cliff Richard

== Births ==
- 13 January – Suggs, singer (Madness)
- 27 January – Gillian Gilbert (New Order)
- 16 February – Andy Taylor, guitarist (Duran Duran)
- 20 March – Slim Jim Phantom (The Stray Cats)
- 1 April
  - Susan Boyle, Scottish singer
  - Mark White (ABC)
- 28 April – Roland Gift, singer (Fine Young Cannibals)
- 4 May – Jay Aston, singer (Bucks Fizz)
- 7 May – Phil Campbell, Welsh heavy metal guitarist (Motörhead)
- 12 May – Billy Duffy, English guitarist and songwriter (The Cult, Theatre of Hate, and The Nosebleeds)
- 18 May – Russell Senior, guitarist and violinist (Pulp)
- 20 May – Nick Heyward, singer-songwriter
- 14 June – Boy George, singer
- 18 June – Alison Moyet, singer
- 22 June – Jimmy Somerville, singer
- 24 June – Curt Smith, singer (Tears for Fears)
- 25 June – Ricky Gervais, comedian and singer
- 3 July – Tim Smith, English singer-songwriter, guitarist, producer (Cardiacs, The Sea Nymphs, Spratleys Japs, and Panixphere)
- 23 July – Martin Gore, rock musician and songwriter
- 13 August – Stuart Maconie, DJ and music critic
- 15 August – Matt Johnson, singer-songwriter
- 22 August – Roland Orzabal (Tears for Fears)
- 23 August – Mark Bedford (Madness)
- 28 August – Kim Appleby, singer (Mel and Kim)
- 14 September – David Sawer, composer
- 22 November – Stephen Hough, pianist
- 17 December – Sara Dallin, vocalist (Bananarama)
- 29 December – Jim Reid, vocalist (Jesus and Mary Chain)
- date unknown
  - Paul Carr, composer
  - Nigel Clarke, composer

== Deaths ==
- January – Margaret Balfour, mezzo-soprano, 69
- 26 February – Lee Lawrence, singer, 40 (heart attack)
- 6 March – George Formby, music hall comedian, singer & songwriter and ukulele player extraordinaire, 56 (heart attack)
- 8 March – Sir Thomas Beecham, conductor, 81
- 7 April – W. Arundel Orchard, organist, pianist, composer and conductor, 93
- 14 August – Heddle Nash, operatic tenor, 67
- 15 August – Katharine Emily Eggar, pianist, 87
- 23 November – York Bowen, pianist and composer, 77
- 25 November – Adelina de Lara, pianist and composer, 89
- 30 November – Winifred Lawson, opera and concert soprano, 69
- 30 December – Boris Ord, organist and choirmaster, 64

== See also ==
- 1961 in British radio
- 1961 in British television
- 1961 in the United Kingdom
- List of British films of 1961
