= 1961 in British radio =

This is a list of events from British radio in 1961.

== Events ==
- 5 June – Hans Keller broadcasts a performance of the spoof avant-garde composition Mobile for Tape and Percussion by the fictitious composer Piotr Zak on the BBC Third Programme.
- 29 July – William Glock is now controller of music for the BBC and The Proms. One of his first commissions is of Symphonies, Op 46 by Elisabeth Lutyens, an indication of his modernistic sympathies.
- September – Alan Freeman replaces David Jacobs as the main presenter of Pick of the Pops.
- David Davis is appointed head of children's sound broadcasting at the BBC.
- Chorus singer Irene Thomas enters and wins the Brain of Britain contest, heralding a forty-year period as a mainstay of radio panel game quiz programmes.

== Programme debuts ==
- 8 October – In Touch on the BBC Home Service (1961–Present)
- October – Once Over Lightly on the BBC Light Programme (1961–1962)

== Continuing radio programmes ==
=== 1940s ===
- Music While You Work (1940–1967)
- Sunday Half Hour (1940–2018)
- Desert Island Discs (1942–Present)
- Family Favourites (1945–1980)
- Down Your Way (1946–1992)
- Have A Go (1946–1967)
- Housewives' Choice (1946–1967)
- Letter from America (1946–2004)
- Woman's Hour (1946–Present)
- Twenty Questions (1947–1976)
- Any Questions? (1948–Present)
- Mrs Dale's Diary (1948–1969)
- Billy Cotton Band Show (1949–1968)
- A Book at Bedtime (1949–Present)

=== 1950s ===
- The Archers (1950–Present)
- Listen with Mother (1950–1982)
- From Our Own Correspondent (1955–Present)
- Pick of the Pops (1955–Present)
- The Clitheroe Kid (1957–1972)
- My Word! (1957–1988)
- Test Match Special (1957–Present)
- The Today Programme (1957–Present)
- The Navy Lark (1959–1977)
- Sing Something Simple (1959–2001)
- Your Hundred Best Tunes (1959–2007)

=== 1960s ===
- Farming Today (1960–Present)
- Easy Beat (1960–1967)

== Ending this year ==
- 29 January – Ray's a Laugh (1949–1961)

== Births ==
- 1 January – Fiona Phillips, radio and television presenter
- 3 January – Justin Webb, journalist and presenter on Today
- 3 March – Paul Baskerville, disc jockey
- 10 April – Nicky Campbell, Scottish-born broadcast presenter
- 14 May – David Quantick, comedy writer, music journalist and radio broadcaster
- 24 June – David Tyler, broadcast comedy producer
- 28 June – Mark Goodier, disc jockey
- 10 July – Marc Riley, disc jockey
- 17 July – Jeremy Hardy, comedian (died 2019)
- 22 July – Carolyn Quinn, journalist and presenter on PM
- 27 June – Lynn Parsons, disc jockey
- 25 October – Pat Sharp, radio and television presenter
- October – Clive Coleman, barrister, legal journalist and sitcom writer
- Unknown
  - Robin Brooks, radio dramatist
  - Corrie Corfield, newsreader
  - Martin Hyder, comedy actor

== Deaths ==
- 21 April – Wallace Greenslade, announcer (born 1912)
- 22 October – L. Stanton Jefferies, musician and radio producer (born 1896)

== See also ==
- 1961 in British music
- 1961 in British television
- 1961 in the United Kingdom
- List of British films of 1961
