= List of British films of 1961 =

A list of films produced in the United Kingdom in 1961 (see 1961 in film):

== 1961 ==
Title	Director	Cast	Genre	Notes
1961
Bomb in the High Street	Peter Bezencenet, Terry Bishop	Ronald Howard, Suzanna Leigh, Jack Allen	Drama	
The Breaking Point	Lance Comfort	Peter Reynolds, Dermot Walsh, Lisa Gastoni	Crime	
Carry On Regardless	Gerald Thomas	Sid James, Kenneth Williams, Charles Hawtrey	Comedy	
Cash on Demand	Quentin Lawrence	Peter Cushing, André Morell, Richard Vernon	Thriller	
Clue of the Silver Key	Gerard Glaister	Bernard Lee, Lyndon Brook, Finlay Currie	Crime	
The Court Martial of Major Keller	Ernest Morris	Laurence Payne, Susan Stephen, Austin Trevor	Drama	
The Curse of the Werewolf	Terence Fisher	Clifford Evans, Oliver Reed, Yvonne Romain	Horror	
The Day the Earth Caught Fire	Val Guest	Edward Judd, Janet Munro, Leo McKern	Sci-fi	
Dentist on the Job	C. M. Pennington-Richards	Kenneth Connor, Shirley Eaton, Bob Monkhouse	Comedy	
The Devil's Daffodil	Ákos Ráthonyi	William Lucas, Penelope Horner, Ingrid van Bergen	Crime	Co-production with West Germany
Don't Bother to Knock	Cyril Frankel	Richard Todd, Nicole Maurey, Elke Sommer	Comedy	
Double Bunk	C. M. Pennington-Richards	Ian Carmichael, Sid James, Liz Fraser	Comedy	
During One Night	Sidney J. Furie	Don Borisenko, Susan Hampshire	Drama	
Five Golden Hours	Mario Zampi	Ernie Kovacs, Cyd Charisse, George Sanders	Comedy	
Flame in the Streets	Roy Ward Baker	John Mills, Sylvia Syms	Drama	
Follow That Man	Jerome Epstein	Sydney Chaplin, Dawn Addams, Elspeth March	Comedy	
Freedom to Die	Francis Searle	Paul Maxwell, Felicity Young	Crime	
The Frightened City	John Lemont	Herbert Lom, Sean Connery	Crime	
Fury at Smugglers' Bay	John Gilling	Peter Cushing, Bernard Lee, Michèle Mercier	Adventure	
Girl on Approval	Charles Frend	Rachel Roberts, James Maxwell	Drama	
The Girl on the Boat	Henry Kaplan	Norman Wisdom, Millicent Martin	Comedy	
Gorgo	Eugène Lourié	Bill Travers, William Sylvester	Sci-fi	
The Green Helmet	Michael Forlong	Bill Travers, Ed Begley	Drama	
The Greengage Summer	Lewis Gilbert	Kenneth More, Danielle Darrieux	Drama	
The Guns of Navarone	J. Lee Thompson	Gregory Peck, David Niven, Anthony Quinn	World War II	
The Hellfire Club	Robert S. Baker; Monty Berman	Keith Michell, Adrienne Corri, Peter Cushing	Adventure	
The Hellions	Irving Allen, Ken Annakin	Richard Todd, Anne Aubrey	Adventure	
Highway to Battle	Ernest Morris	Gerard Heinz, Margaret Tyzack	Drama	
House of Mystery	Vernon Sewell	Peter Dyneley, Jane Hylton	Horror	
The Impersonator	Alfred Shaughnessy	John Crawford, Jane Griffiths	Mystery	
Information Received	Robert Lynn	Sabine Sesselmann, William Sylvester	Crime	
The Innocents	Jack Clayton	Deborah Kerr, Michael Redgrave, Peter Wyngarde, Megs Jenkins	Horror	Entered into the 1962 Cannes Film Festival
Invasion Quartet	Jay Lewis	Bill Travers, Spike Milligan	Comedy	
Jungle Street	Charles Saunders	Jill Ireland, David McCallum, Kenneth Cope	Crime	
The Kitchen	James Hill	Carl Möhner, Mary Yeomans	Drama	
The Long and the Short and the Tall	Leslie Norman	Laurence Harvey, Richard Todd	World War II	
Lunch Hour	James Hill	Shirley Anne Field, Robert Stephens	Comedy	
The Man in the Back Seat	Vernon Sewell	Derren Nesbitt, Keith Faulkner	Crime	
The Mark	Guy Green	Maria Schell, Stuart Whitman	Drama	
Mary Had a Little...	Edward Buzzell	Agnes Laurent, Hazel Court, Jack Watling	Comedy	
A Matter of WHO	Don Chaffey	Terry-Thomas, Sonja Ziemann	Crime	
Mr. Topaze	Peter Sellers	Peter Sellers, Nadia Gray	Comedy	
Murder She Said	George Pollock	Margaret Rutherford, Stringer Davis	Mystery	
Mysterious Island	Cy Endfield	Michael Craig, Joan Greenwood, Herbert Lom	Sci-fi adventure	
The Naked Edge	Michael Anderson	Gary Cooper, Deborah Kerr	Thriller	
Nearly a Nasty Accident	Don Chaffey	Jimmy Edwards, Kenneth Connor	Comedy	
The Night We Got the Bird	Darcy Conyers	Brian Rix, Dora Bryan	Comedy	
Night Without Pity	Theodore Zichy	Sarah Lawson, Neil McCallum	Crime	
No Love for Johnnie	Ralph Thomas	Peter Finch	Drama	Finch won the Silver Bear for Best Actor at Berlin.
No My Darling Daughter	Ralph Thomas	Michael Redgrave, Michael Craig	Comedy	
Nothing Barred	Darcy Conyers	Brian Rix, Leo Franklyn	Comedy	
On the Fiddle	Cyril Frankel	Alfred Lynch, Sean Connery, Stanley Holloway	Comedy/action	
Out of the Shadow	Michael Winner	Terence Longdon, Donald Gray	Thriller	
Over the Odds	Michael Forlong	Marjorie Rhodes, Glenn Melvyn	Comedy	
Part-Time Wife	Max Varnel	Anton Rodgers, Nyree Dawn Porter	Comedy	
Partners in Crime	Peter Duffell	Bernard Lee, Stanley Morgan	Crime	
Passport to China	Michael Carreras	Richard Basehart, Lisa Gastoni	Adventure	
Payroll	Sidney Hayers	Michael Craig, Françoise Prévost, Billie Whitelaw	Crime	
Petticoat Pirates	David MacDonald	Charlie Drake, Anne Heywood, Thorley Walters	Comedy	
Pit of Darkness	Lance Comfort	William Franklyn, Moira Redmond	Thriller	
The Queen's Guards	Michael Powell	Daniel Massey, Robert Stephens	Drama	
Rag Doll	Lance Comfort	Jess Conrad, Kenneth Griffith	Crime	
Raising the Wind	Gerald Thomas	James Robertson Justice, Leslie Phillips	Comedy	
The Rebel	Robert Day	Tony Hancock, George Sanders, Paul Massie	Comedy	
Return of a Stranger	Max Varnel	John Ireland, Susan Stephen, Cyril Shaps	Thriller	
The Roman Spring of Mrs. Stone	José Quintero	Vivien Leigh, Warren Beatty, Lotte Lenya	Drama	
Savage Guns	Michael Carreras	Richard Basehart	Western	Co-production with Spain
The Secret Partner	Basil Dearden	Stewart Granger, Bernard Lee	Crime	
Seven Keys	Pat Jackson	Alan Dobie, Jeannie Carson, Delphi Lawrence, John Carson	Crime	
The Shadow of the Cat	John Gilling	Conrad Phillips, Barbara Shelley, André Morell	Horror	
The Singer Not the Song	Roy Ward Baker	Dirk Bogarde, John Mills	Western	
The Snake Woman	Sidney J. Furie	Susan Travers, John McCarthy	Horror	
So Evil, So Young	Godfrey Grayson	Jill Ireland, Ellen Pollock	Drama	
Spare the Rod	Leslie Norman	Max Bygraves, Geoffrey Keen, Donald Pleasence	Drama	
A Story of David	Bob McNaught	Jeff Chandler, Basil Sydney	Drama	Co-production with Israel
Strip Tease Murder	Ernest Morris	John Hewer, Ann Lynn	Crime	
Taste of Fear	Seth Holt	Susan Strasberg, Ronald Lewis, Christopher Lee	Thriller	
A Taste of Honey	Tony Richardson	Dora Bryan, Robert Stephens, Rita Tushingham	Drama	
The Third Alibi	Montgomery Tully	Laurence Payne, Patricia Dainton	Thriller	
Three on a Spree	Sidney J. Furie	Jack Watling, Carole Lesley, Renée Houston	Comedy	
Ticket to Paradise	Francis Searle	Emrys Jones, Patricia Dainton	Romance	
The Treasure of Monte Cristo	Monty Berman	Rory Calhoun, Patricia Bredin, John Gregson	Adventure	
Two Living, One Dead	Anthony Asquith	Virginia McKenna, Bill Travers	Thriller	Co-production with Sweden
The Unstoppable Man	Terry Bishop	Cameron Mitchell, Marius Goring, Harry H. Corbett	Drama	
Very Important Person	Ken Annakin	James Robertson Justice, Stanley Baxter	Comedy	
Victim	Basil Dearden	Dirk Bogarde, Dennis Price, Sylvia Syms	Drama	
Watch It, Sailor!	Wolf Rilla	Dennis Price, Liz Fraser	Comedy	
A Weekend with Lulu	John Paddy Carstairs	Bob Monkhouse, Leslie Phillips	Comedy	
What a Carve Up!	Pat Jackson	Sid James, Kenneth Connor	Comedy	
What a Whopper	Gilbert Gunn	Adam Faith, Sid James	Comedy	
Whistle Down the Wind	Bryan Forbes	Hayley Mills, Bernard Lee, Alan Bates	Drama	
The Wind of Change	Vernon Sewell	Donald Pleasence, Johnny Briggs, Ann Lynn	Drama	
The Young Ones	Sidney J. Furie	Cliff Richard, Robert Morley	Musical	

== See also ==
- 1961 in British music
- 1961 in British radio
- 1961 in British television
- 1961 in the United Kingdom
