= Highbury Theatre =

Theatre in Sutton Coldfield, Birmingham, England

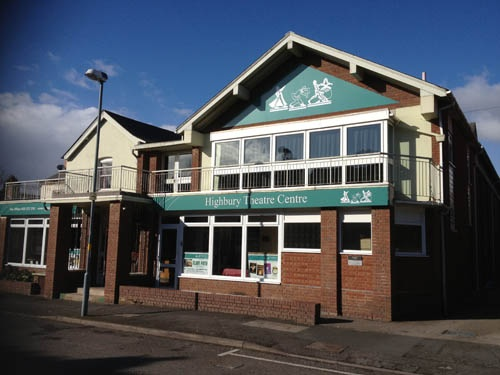
- Interactive map of Highbury Theatre
- Address: Sheffield Road; Birmingham; England
- Coordinates: 52.537894°N 1.834181°W
- Capacity: 140 (Main Stage); 40+ (Studio)
- Type: Proscenium; Studio
- Public transit: Chester Road

Construction
- Built: 1937–1942
- Opened: 1942
- Rebuilt: 1980

Website
- www.highburytheatre.co.uk

Highbury Theatre is a non-professional theatre situated in the Royal Town of Sutton Coldfield, Birmingham, England. It is one of the oldest established amateur theatres in the city and a founding member of the Little Theatre Guild of Great Britain.

== Origins ==
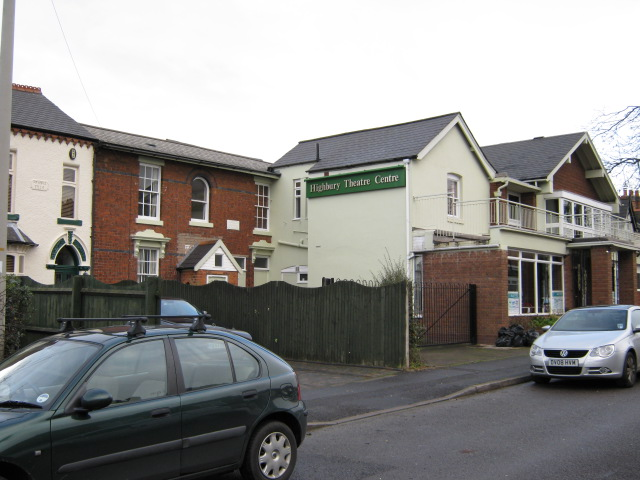
Highbury Theatre

Conceived in 1924 by Bertie English, the theatre originally started life as a simple play reading group, under the name, The Erdington ILP Play-reading Circle. As the members passion developed from just reading plays together, they began to start producing and acting in various productions. On 5 March 1925, they performed their first stage production of Little Sins and Pretty Sinners at the Folkhouse, Erdington. In 1928, a 17-year-old John English, took over from his father as the Director of the company. Rehearsals would often be held at his home which was named, Highbury. Subsequently, in that same year, the group chose to rename themselves after their rehearsal space and became; The Highbury Players. Due to no theatre of their own, the company were still having to produce plays in local church halls until 1935. In hope more than expectation they set up a building fund and began to search for premises.

In 1937, they purchased the freehold site on Sheffield Road from Rhonda Anstey (of Anstey College of Physical Education), using an existing World War I mission chapel (once used as a hospital for World War I veterans) as the basis for their new theatre, at a cost of just over £200. Using this basic structure they built, almost entirely on their own, their own theatre. Members learnt new skills on site first hand, to build brick walls, plastering, joinery, electrics, metalwork and much more, pulling together to create a theatre of their own. They worked both night and day during the early years of the Second World War to complete it. When the war broke out in 1939 most of the work was undertaken by the female members. It was through dedication and without financial aid or patronage; that the theatre was constructed, along with its traditions which helped to lay the foundations of what it eventually became. The original theatre seats were donated to the theatre when the then newly refurbished Prince of Wales theatre in the City Centre was bombed during an air raid, some of the seats still proudly bore the bomb splinters. When building work was completed, the new building was christened; Highbury Little Theatre.

Highbury Little Theatre officially opened on 22 May 1942 with George Bernard Shaw's Arms and the Man and has since then continually produced a season of plays for the last 7 decades. The theatre and its programme are constantly being revised and adjusted for a 21st Century theatregoing audience.

It was in 1946 that John English who, along with other theatre directors around the country, had the vision to form the Little Theatre Guild of Great Britain of which Highbury was a founder member, alongside The Crescent Theatre and The Questors Theatre with 6 other theatre companies. The early years of the twentieth century saw the beginning of the "little theatre" movement, whereby small, independent theatres ran on an unpaid basis providing theatre to their local areas. In January 1949, Highbury hosted its first Guild National Conference with an increased number of 14 member theatres. From the 9 original members, the LTG now have over 100 member theatres. English consequently went on to co-found The Midlands Arts Centre and the Arena Theatre Company along with his wife Mollie Randle.

The Theatre was fortunate enough to have amongst its Patrons the founder of The Birmingham Rep; Sir Barry Jackson, the actor Sir Cedric Hardwicke and MP Sir John Mellor, 2nd Baronet alongside fifteen other influential people in both the local and theatrical communities.

During the 1980s major alterations and extensions took place. This was possible due to the acquisition of an old shop next door, which was incorporated into the theatre allowing the theatre to expand and add more facilities to a much better equipped theatre. During this period, the theatre's executive body also purchased land and houses that surrounded the theatre, as a result they could, and still remain able to, rent out the houses/apartments with the funds being used to support the theatre and allowing it to produce more challenging plays without the fear of making losses.

In 2008, the decision was made that the theatre change its name for the second time in its history, this time changing it to; Highbury Theatre Centre. This was primarily due to the fact that the theatre had been expanding over the years offering more than just theatre and offering more facilities to the community, essentially making it a community theatre. In 2018 as part of a marketing revamp, the theatre slightly edited its name once more, to the more to the point, Highbury Theatre.

== Plays ==
The theatre's resident company remains, The Highbury Players who during the course of a 10-month season; put on 7 Main Stage productions and 3 Studio plays. The plays are chosen by an elected Arts Committee led by the Arts Director and aim to continue the Highbury tradition of having within every season; an English Classic, an International Classic and a play connecting the theatre with our own times, amongst both classic and contemporary plays. The theatre is one of two major amateur companies that operate in the Sutton Coldfield area, the other being Sutton Arts Theatre who have close ties with Highbury both historically and personally.

All plays staged at the theatre are reviewed by the online reviewers Behind the Arras who employ retired, professional theatre journalists to critique each production. Each year, plays and performances are nominated for the BFAME Awards. This is a ceremony held with all the nominated amateur theatres in the city and in which Highbury has either received a nomination in a certain category or won every year.

In September 2014 it was announced that Highbury would be working in partnership with Birmingham Town Hall and Symphony Hall (THSH) to support community arts as Birmingham City Council Arts Champions for the Sutton Coldfield District.

== Opportunities ==
The theatre is a registered charity and is run entirely by a 160+ team of dedicated volunteers who are involved in many aspects from acting, directing, set design, costume, front of house amongst numerous other opportunities. The theatre welcomes newcomers allowing them to get involved in all areas, such as helping out as a costumer in their extensive wardrobe departments or by helping construct some of their award-winning sets.

The theatre is a valuable asset to the local and wider community; with various events and art exhibitions taking place there throughout the year. In late 2013, the theatre decided to resurrect one of the original theatre's features from 1943 to 1956, the Highbury Film Club. Working alongside the British Film Institute and the British Federation of Film Societies. The original club was known for showing Experimental films and arthouse films from around the world, which they have now reintroduced alongside classic films. The new, reinstated film club became a permanent fixture in 2014, now being included in all the theatre's future seasons.

== Other facilities ==
The theatre is also home to Highbury Youth Theatre, which gives local children the chance to experience performing on stage, in front of a live audience, as well as developing their skills and confidence. Members are given the opportunity to work towards LAMDA examinations should they wish and have access to the National Association of Youth Theatres' workshops.

The theatre is one of few amateur societies that has its own premises, doing so enables the theatre to be able to provide more amenities to both members and audiences. It has its own bar, coffee lounge, 3 large dressing rooms, communal green room, vast wardrobe departments, in house set building workshops, rehearsal rooms, props department, furniture store and more. Therefore the theatre is available for hire by external companies who are without places to rehearse and stage their own productions.

== Milestones ==
On 29 April 2014, the theatre commemorated the 90th anniversary of the formation of The ILP Play reading circle, by having a special reading of two of the first plays ever performed by them back in 1924 when the company simply read the plays. The plays, by John Drinkwater, included; The Storm and X=0. On 5 March 2015, the theatre celebrated the 90th anniversary of The Highbury Players first ever stage production. At the event, rare unseen film footage was shown of the original members building the first theatre.

== Notable members ==
The following people were Highbury Players and/or members;

- John English - MAC Founder
- Tony Garnett - Film & Television Producer
- Anne Heywood - Actress
- Topsy Jane - Actress
- Ronald Magill - Emmerdale Actor
- Garfield Morgan - Actor
- Henry Reed - Poet and dramatist
- Nicol Williamson - RSC Actor
