= List of best-selling singles of the 1960s in the United Kingdom =

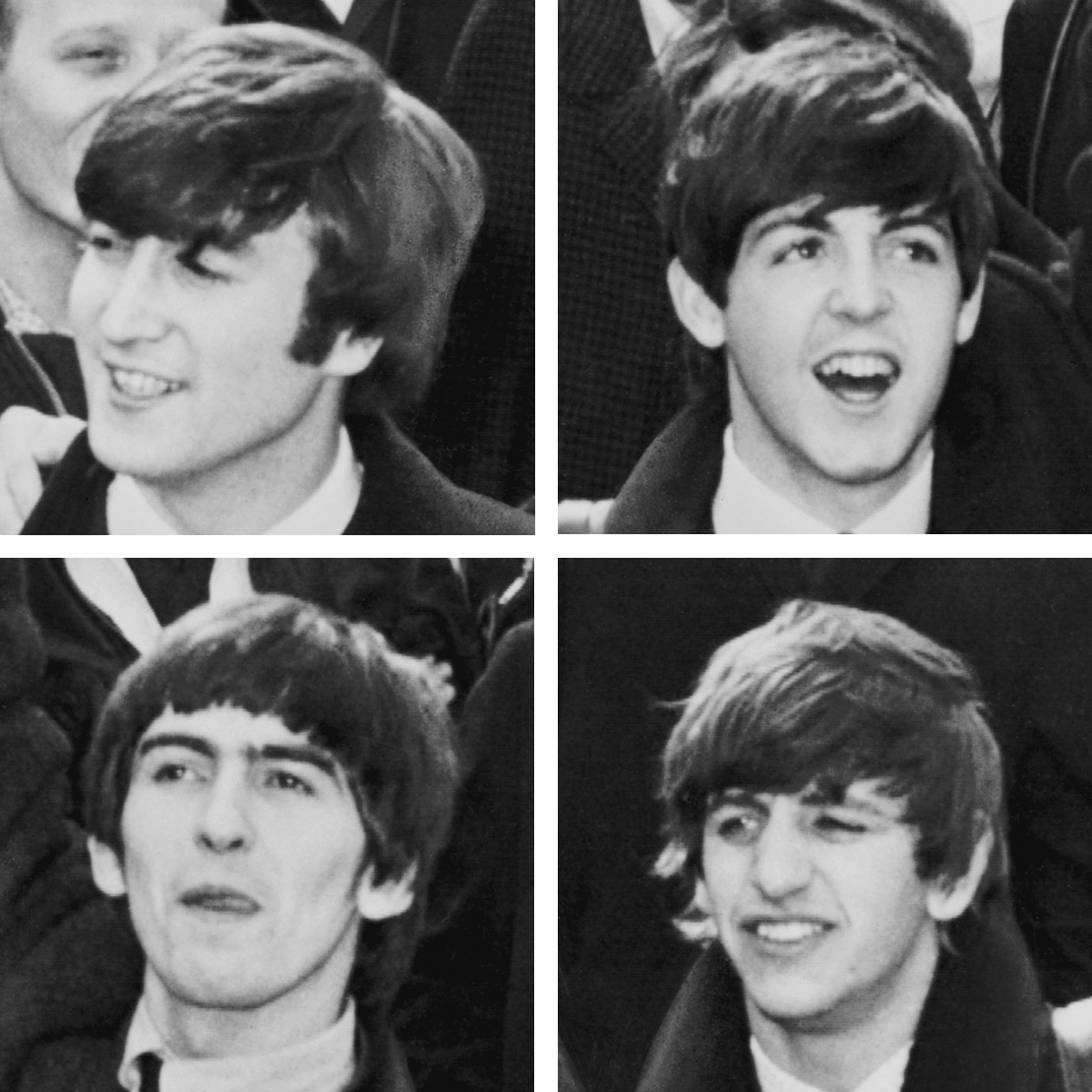
The Beatles released 18 of the best-selling songs of the 1960s.

A single is a type of music release defined by the British Official Charts Company (OCC) as having no more than four tracks and not lasting longer than 25 minutes. On 31 May 2010, a retrospective record chart was broadcast on BBC Radio 2 that listed the 60 biggest-selling singles in the United Kingdom during the 1960s. The programme, entitled The Top 60 Best Selling Records of the 60s, was hosted by British DJ Tony Blackburn. The chart was compiled by the OCC, and was based on sales of singles from 1 January 1960 to 31 December 1969.

The most represented act in the chart is the Beatles, who feature on the list with 18 releases, seven of which are in the top twenty. Similarly, the most represented record label is Parlophone, who released music from the Beatles between 1962 and 1968 in the UK. The most represented act after the Beatles is the Rolling Stones, who have five singles in the list. The highest-placed solo female artist on the list is Cilla Black at number 27, with her 1964 single "Anyone Who Had a Heart", which was also distributed by Parlophone. Of the 60 discs in the chart, more than half (44) are by British acts.

During the 1960s, sales of singles in the UK were monitored by several magazines, including New Musical Express (NME), Record Retailer, Melody Maker and Disc. Before 1969, no officially recognised singles chart was published in the UK. Until 10 March 1960, chart compilers used the weekly chart listed by NME, after which they moved to the singles list published by Record Retailer, despite NME having the wider circulation and higher readership. During the start of the decade, Record Retailer was sampling roughly 30 stores; NME and Melody Maker had a sample size of more than one hundred. One source explains that the reason for using the Record Retailer chart for the early 1960s was that it was "the only chart to have as many as 50 positions for almost the entire decade". On 15 February 1969, Record Retailer and the BBC jointly commissioned the British Market Research Bureau (BMRB) to record sales of singles in what officially became the UK Singles Chart. The BMRB compiled the chart by using hand-written and post-submitted data from approximately 250 record stores.

Between 1960 and 1969, fourteen singles sold more than one million copies in the UK, of which the biggest-selling was "She Loves You" by the Beatles. Released on 23 August 1963, the single spent six non-consecutive weeks at number one and sold more than 1.89 million copies, approximately 140,000 more than its nearest rival, "I Want to Hold Your Hand", also by the Beatles. The biggest-selling record not to top the UK Singles Chart was Acker Bilk's 1961 instrumental "Stranger on the Shore" – it sold more than 1.13 million copies and peaked at number two, being kept off the top by "The Young Ones" by Cliff Richard and the Shadows, another million-seller.

== Singles ==
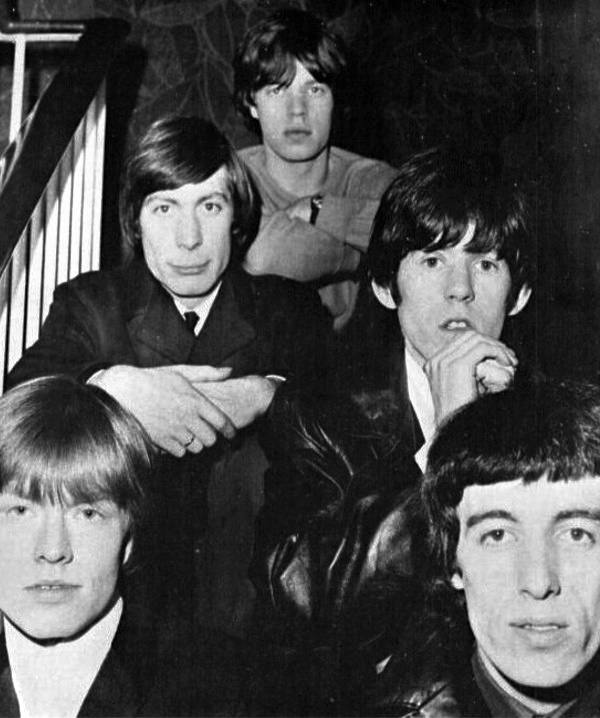
The Rolling Stones had five of the biggest-selling singles of the decade.

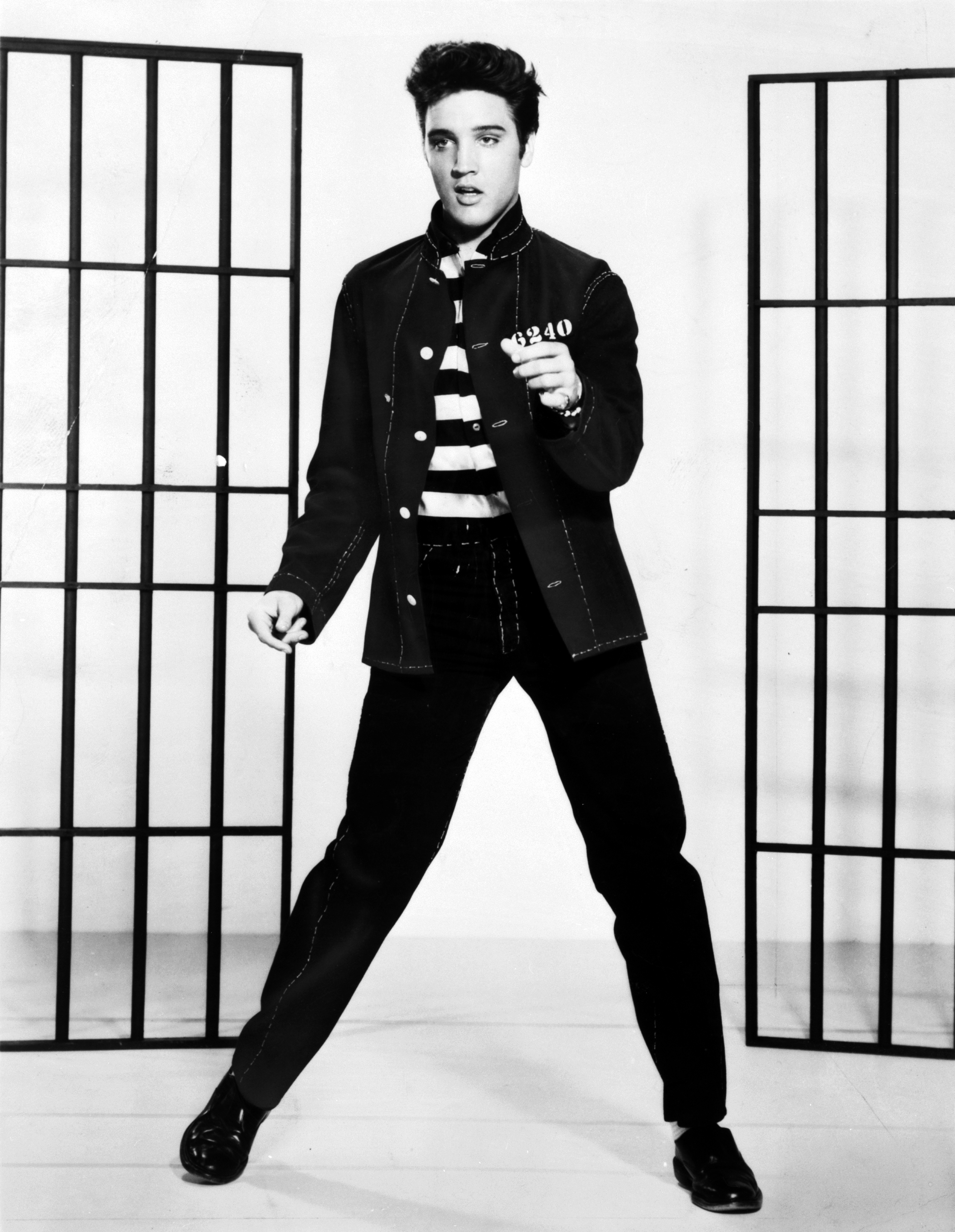
American singer Elvis Presley featured in the decade-end singles chart with four songs.

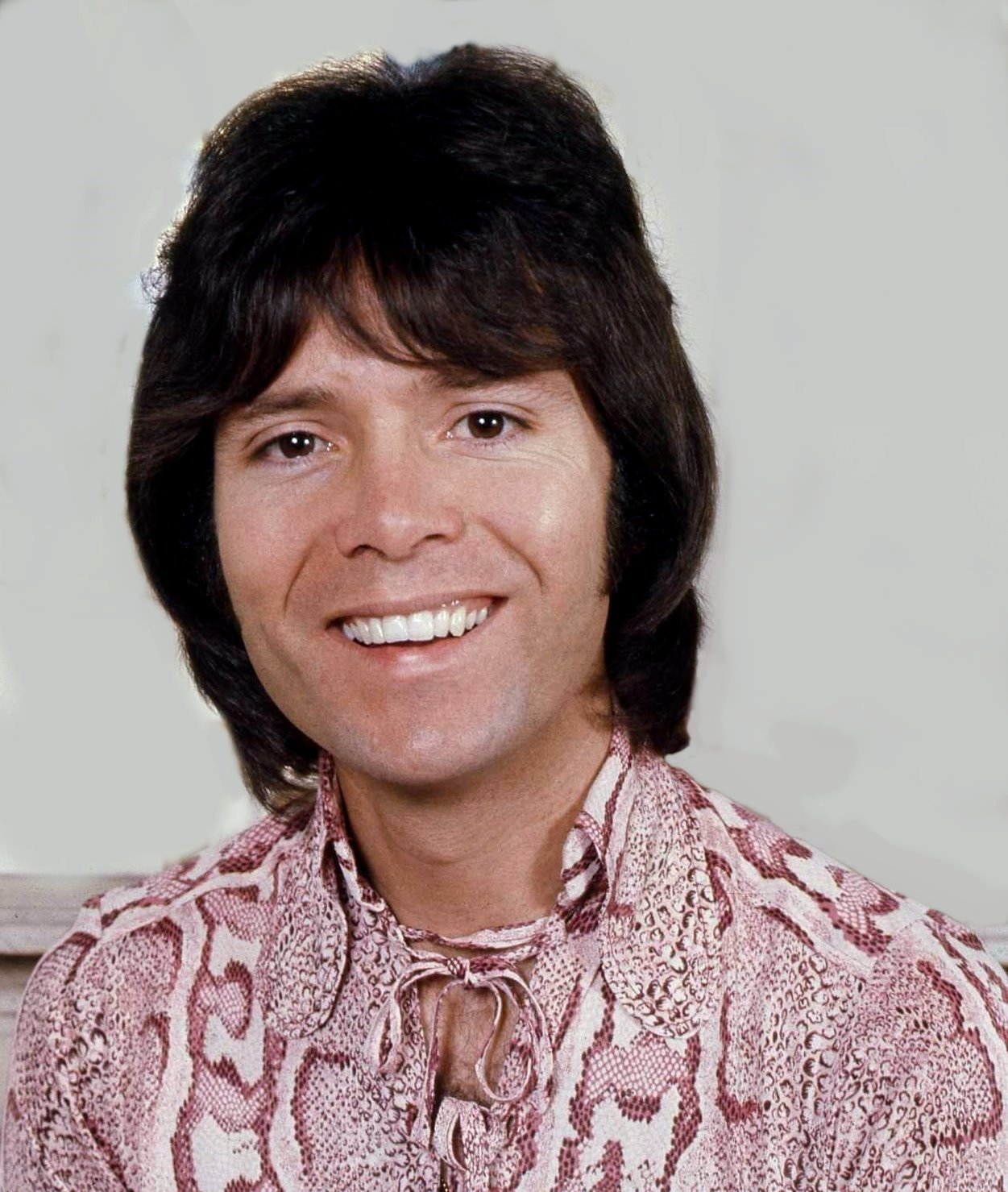
Between 1960 and 1969, Cliff Richard released three of the best-selling singles.

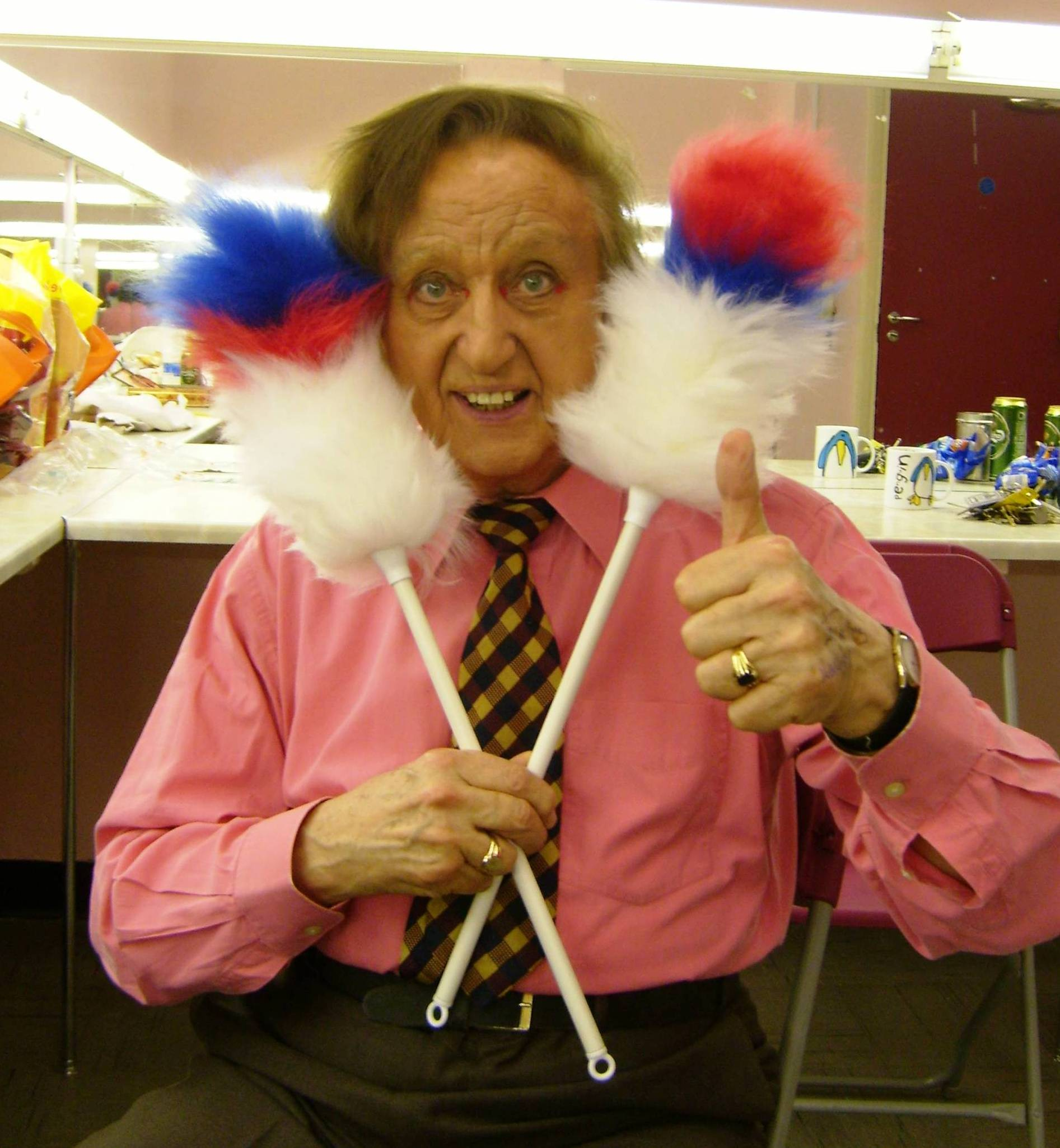
British comedian Ken Dodd's 1965 song "Tears" was the third best-selling track of the decade.

Best-selling singles of the 1960s in the UK
No.	Single	Artist	Record label (Note: The record labels, years and chart peaks are those given by the OCC.)	Year	Chart peak
1	"She Loves You"	The Beatles	Parlophone	1963	1
2	"I Want to Hold Your Hand"	The Beatles	Parlophone	1963	1
3	"Tears"	Ken Dodd	Columbia	1965	1
4	"Can't Buy Me Love"	The Beatles	Parlophone	1964	1
5	"I Feel Fine"	The Beatles	Parlophone	1964	1
6	"The Carnival Is Over"	The Seekers	Columbia	1965	1
7	"We Can Work It Out" / "Day Tripper"	The Beatles	Parlophone	1965	1
8	"Release Me"	Engelbert Humperdinck	Decca	1967	1
9	"It's Now or Never"	Elvis Presley	RCA	1960	1
10	"Green, Green Grass of Home"	Tom Jones	Decca	1966	1
11	"The Last Waltz"	Engelbert Humperdinck	Decca	1967	1
12	"Stranger on the Shore"	Acker Bilk	Columbia	1961	2
13	"I Remember You"	Frank Ifield	Columbia	1962	1
14	"The Young Ones"	Cliff Richard and The Shadows	Columbia	1962	1
15	"Sugar, Sugar"	The Archies	RCA	1969	1
16	"The Next Time" / "Bachelor Boy"	Cliff Richard and The Shadows	Columbia	1962	1
17	"Telstar"	The Tornados	Decca	1962	1
18	"From Me to You"	The Beatles	Parlophone	1963	1
19	"Two Little Boys"	Rolf Harris	Columbia	1969	1
20	"Hey Jude"	The Beatles	Apple	1968	1
21	"Hello, Goodbye"	The Beatles	Parlophone	1967	1
22	"There Goes My Everything"	Engelbert Humperdinck	Decca	1967	2
23	"Help!"	The Beatles	Parlophone	1965	1
24	"Cathy's Clown"	The Everly Brothers	Warner Bros.	1960	1
25	"Glad All Over"	The Dave Clark Five	Columbia	1963	1
26	"Needles and Pins"	The Searchers	Pye	1964	1
27	"Anyone Who Had a Heart"	Cilla Black	Parlophone	1964	1
28	"Apache"	The Shadows	Columbia	1960	1
29	"Lovesick Blues"	Frank Ifield	Columbia	1962	1
30	"My Way"	Frank Sinatra	Reprise	1969	5
31	"Distant Drums"	Jim Reeves	RCA	1966	1
32	"You'll Never Walk Alone"	Gerry and the Pacemakers	Columbia	1963	1
33	"Get Back"	The Beatles and Billy Preston	Apple	1969	1
34	"All You Need Is Love"	The Beatles	Parlophone	1967	1
35	"Strangers in the Night"	Frank Sinatra	Reprise	1966	1
36	"The Last Time"	The Rolling Stones	Decca	1965	1
37	"Are You Lonesome Tonight?"	Elvis Presley	RCA	1961	1
38	"I'll Never Find Another You"	The Seekers	Columbia	1965	1
39	"Are You Sure?"	The Allisons	Fontana	1961	2
40	"Yellow Submarine" / "Eleanor Rigby"	The Beatles	Parlophone	1966	1
41	"I'm a Believer"	The Monkees	RCA	1967	1
42	"Paperback Writer"	The Beatles	Parlophone	1966	1
43	"(I Can't Get No) Satisfaction"	The Rolling Stones	Decca	1965	1
44	"Ticket to Ride"	The Beatles	Parlophone	1965	1
45	"Those Were the Days"	Mary Hopkin	Apple	1968	1
46	Magical Mystery Tour (Note: Magical Mystery Tour was released as an extended play in the UK, which, at the time, qualified it for the UK Singles Chart.)	The Beatles	Parlophone	1967	2
47	"Wooden Heart"	Elvis Presley	RCA	1961	1
48	"19th Nervous Breakdown"	The Rolling Stones	Decca	1966	2
49	"It's Not Unusual"	Tom Jones	Decca	1965	1
50	"Honky Tonk Women"	The Rolling Stones	Decca	1969	1
51	"Penny Lane" / "Strawberry Fields Forever"	The Beatles	Parlophone	1967	2
52	"A Hard Day's Night"	The Beatles	Parlophone	1964	1
53	"I Love You Because"	Jim Reeves	RCA	1964	5
54	"Summer Holiday"	Cliff Richard and The Shadows	Columbia	1963	1
55	"Oh, Pretty Woman"	Roy Orbison	London	1964	1
56	"I Won't Forget You"	Jim Reeves	RCA	1964	3
57	"Lady Madonna"	The Beatles	Parlophone	1968	1
58	"Surrender"	Elvis Presley	RCA	1961	1
59	"Delilah"	Tom Jones	Decca	1968	2
60	"Jumpin' Jack Flash"	The Rolling Stones	Decca	1968	1
