= Ring-A-Ding Girl =

1962 song by Ronnie Carroll

Single by Ronnie Carroll
- Released: 1962
- Composer: Syd Cordell
- Lyricist: Stan Butcher

Eurovision Song Contest 1962 entry
- Country: United Kingdom
- Artist: Ronnie Carroll
- Language: English
- Composer: Syd Cordell
- Lyricist: Stan Butcher
- Conductor: Wally Stott

Finals performance
- Final result: 4th
- Final points: 10

Entry chronology
- ◄ "Are You Sure" (1961)
- "Say Wonderful Things" (1963) ►

"Ring-A-Ding Girl" is a song written by Syd Cordell and Stan Butcher and performed by Ronnie Carroll. It represented the United Kingdom in the Eurovision Song Contest 1962.

On the night of the contest the song was performed 13th, following Yugoslavia's Lola Novaković with "Ne pali svetla u sumrak" and Luxembourg's Camillo Felgen with "Petit bonhomme". At the close of the voting the song had received 10 points, placing 4th in a field of 16.

The song reached #46 on the UK Singles Chart. Ronnie Carroll returned as the British representative at the following year's Eurovision Song Contest held in London with "Say Wonderful Things".

== Eurovision Song Contest ==
=== A Song For Europe ===
This song participated in the national final to choose the English representative of the 1962 Eurovision Song Contest, held on February 11 of that year at the BBC TV Center. It was presented by David Jacobs. Ten regional juries were in charge of voting.5 Finally, the song "Ring-A-Ding Girl" was declared the winner among 12 songs with 59 points.

=== Eurovision Song Contest 1962 ===
This song was the English representation at the Eurovision Song Contest 1962. The orchestra was conducted by Wally Stott.

The song was performed 13th on the night of March 18, 1962 by Ronnie Carroll, preceded by Yugoslavia with Lola Novaković performing "Ne pali svetla u sumrak" and followed by Luxemburg with Camillo Felgen performing "Petit bonhomme". The votes, the song had received 10 points, being in 4th place with Yugoslavia out of a total of 16.

Preceded by "Are You Sure?" by The Allisons	United Kingdom in the Eurovision Song Contest; 1962	Succeeded by "Say Wonderful Things" by Ronnie Carroll
