= Topsy Jane =

British actress (1938-2014)

Topsy Jane as Audrey in The Loneliness of the Long Distance Runner (1962)

Topsy Jane (2 December 1938 – 4 January 2014) was a British actress of the 1960s. She was in The Loneliness of the Long Distance Runner (1962) and was cast as Liz (the role eventually played by Julie Christie) in the 1963 film Billy Liar but was forced to pull out owing to mental health issues.

== Early life ==
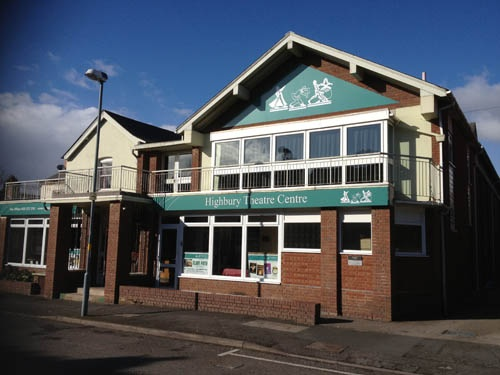
Topsy Jane made an early appearance at the Highbury Little Theatre in 1953

She was born as Topsy Jane Legge in Erdington in Birmingham in 1938, the daughter of Anna Maud née Gumbrell (1907-2006) and Albert Harry Legge (1894-1961), a dairy-man and by 1939 a telephone engineer for the GPO. Her father was a committed Communist and later was to be a major influence in the political awakening of her husband, the British film and television producer and actor Tony Garnett. Topsy Jane was educated at Paget Road School before going on to study at Garrett's Green College. Initially, she intended to train as a children's nurse, but while appearing in amateur theatre at the Varley Players at Pype Hayes Church, the Birmingham Drama Group, and the Highbury Little Theatre she realised she had a talent for acting. Her husband, Tony Garnett, later wrote of her:

"Leaving school at fifteen, Topsy was not academic, although she read voraciously, loving Tolstoy and almost any nineteenth-century English or French novel she could lose herself in. We shared a love of poetry. She loved Keats and I liked Shelley. She would listen as I held forth, no doubt pretentiously, on some matter, using ill-digested political jargon. Then she would ask a penetrating, naive question, using simple Anglo-Saxon words, leaving me spluttering. It was done with no edge. Her love was so guileless, so complete, I never doubted it. No one had loved me so totally since I was five. She became everything to me, emotionally, although I still kept a tough exterior. Our emotional intimacy was without barriers. We trusted each other."

== Acting career ==
Garnett and Topsy Jane moved to London together where she began to carve a career in television and film. Her roles included: Rosie in The Fanatics (1960); the rich young widow Dame Pliant in the television production of The Alchemist (1961) by Ben Jonson; Peggy in The Wind of Change (1961); Con in the TV movie Summer, Autumn, Winter, Spring (1961); Céline in Maigret (1961); Stella Fairly in A Chance of Thunder (1961); in Shadow Play (1961); Amanda opposite Edith Evans in the BBC production of Time Remembered (1961) by Jean Anouilh; Mavis Wayne in Emergency Ward 10 (1962); Jane in Crying Down the Lane (1962), and Mona in Mix Me a Person (1962).

She got her big break when Tony Richardson cast her as Audrey in The Loneliness of the Long Distance Runner (1962) opposite Tom Courtenay. On completion of the film Richardson invited her to join the Royal Shakespeare Company at Stratford-upon-Avon for a season to play Hermia in A Midsummer Night's Dream and other roles, but after much lobbying by Courtenay and John Schlesinger, she turned down Richardson's offer and agreed to make Billy Liar (1963). She was wanted so badly for the film as it was felt that audiences wanted to see her playing opposite Courtenay again, and she began filming as Liz in Billy Liar, but she was forced to withdraw when she developed mental health issues later diagnosed as schizophrenia. Julie Christie was instead cast in the role.

In 1963 she married Tony Garnett, whom she met aged 15 and he was 17 while performing in amateur theatre at Highbury Little Theatre in Sutton Coldfield where they took the leading roles in William Saroyan's 1941 play The Beautiful People. They had a son, William (1964–), and later divorced.

She went on to play Shirley in Trevor (1964); Jean Watts in John Paddington (1965), and Daphne Dawson in United! (1965).

== Illness and death ==
Tony Garnett, in his autobiography The Day the Music Died (2016), relates how Topsy Jane returned home several weeks after filming for Billy Liar commenced: "... unrecognisable. Fat, dishevelled, her hair lank, she walked and talked in slow motion. She only vaguely reminded me of my Topsy. I called Robin Fox, our agent, who said that John Schlesinger had sacked her and recast with Julie Christie because the camera could read nothing in Topsy. Her eyes were dead." Her illness, from which she never fully recovered, seems to have been some form of schizophrenically-induced torpor diagnosed as simple-type schizophrenia, dismissed by Garnett as a "dustbin diagnosis". The treatment for her illness was a "brutal regime" of electroconvulsive therapy and drugs which produced a "functional lobotomy". They later divorced. Her illness later inspired Garnett to make In Two Minds (1967), The Wednesday Play about schizophrenia. In 2005 she was working behind the counter of a café in Liskeard in Cornwall.

She died aged 75 on 4 January 2014 at the Queen Elizabeth Hospital in Birmingham of lung cancer. She had a private family funeral in Sutton Coldfield and was buried in Sutton New Hall Cemetery.
