= Michael Collins (English actor) =

English actor (1922–1979)

- Born: Roy Michael Collins; 21 May 1922; Isleworth, Middlesex, England
- Died: 25 December 1979 (aged 57); Abbotsford, British Columbia, Canada
- Occupation: Television actor

Roy Michael Collins (21 May 1922 – 25 December 1979) was an English television actor. He appeared in many British television series and films, which include Quatermass II, The Adventures of the Scarlet Pimpernel, The Adventures of Robin Hood, The Avengers, No Hiding Place, Emergency Ward 10, Z-Cars, Goldfinger, The Saint, Danger Man, The Newcomers, Bear Island and others.

It was later revealed that he did most of the uncredited English-language dubbing for Gert Fröbe's appearances in many of his films such as Chitty Chitty Bang Bang and Goldfinger.

He died of cancer on Christmas Day 1979, at the age of 57.

== Acting credits ==
Title	Year	Role	Notes
The Kid from Brooklyn	1946	Dancer	Film, Uncredited
BBC Sunday-Night Theatre	1953–1955	1st Operative / Ted Wheatcroft / American journalist / Nathan	5 episodes
The Gentle Falcon	1954	Leader of the search party	Episode: "The Cry of the Falcon"
The King's Square	1955	Charles Fitzsinclair	TV film
Quatermass II	1955	Thompson	Episode: "The Mark"
Sixpenny Corner	1955–1956	Dr. Tim O'Shea	3 episodes
Lilli Palmer Theatre	1956	Second Guard	Episode: "The Old Man of the Air"
The Adventures of the Scarlet Pimpernel	1956	Second Soldier / Messenger	2 episodes
The Condemned	1956		TV film
Nom-de-Plume	1956	Coleridge	Episode: "The Counting-House Clerk"
The Battle of the River Plate	1956	Chief Yeoman, HMS Ajax	Film, Uncredited
Without Love	1956	PC Jackson	TV film
The Adventures of Robin Hood	1956	Man-at-arms	Episode: "The Trap"
The Long Arm	1956	Detective	Film, Uncredited
Town on Trial	1957	P.C. Baker	Film, Uncredited
Boyd Q.C.	1957	Briggs	Episode: "The Open and Shut Case"
The Steel Bayonet	1957	Stretcher bearer	Film
Miracle in Soho	1957	Lorry Driver	Film
Treasure Island	1957	Harry	7 episodes
Hell Drivers	1957	Driver	Film, Uncredited
Campbell's Kingdom	1957	Worker	Film, Uncredited
Ill Met by Moonlight	1957	Seaman	Film, Uncredited
Educated Evans	1958	Tom Rockett	Episode: "Private Wire"
Starr and Company	1958	Johnson	3 episodes
The Square Peg	1958	Paratroop Drop Master	Film, Uncredited
A Night to Remember	1958	Crewman	Film, Uncredited
ITV Play of the Week	1958–1962	Chick / Pugnacious Collier / Cave	3 episodes
Beyond This Place	1959	Detective Sergeant Trevor	Film
The Heart of a Man	1959	Director	Film, Uncredited
ITV Television Playhouse	1959	Charlie Jackson	Episode: "The Lean Years"
Garry Halliday	1959	Inspector Franks	7 episodes
Epilogue to Capricorn	1959	Detective Inspector Mayo	2 episodes
Naked Fury	1959	Detective Sergeant	Film
Dial 999	1959	Driver	3 episodes
Saturday Playhouse	1960	Sergeant Bolam	Episode: "Conflict at Kalanadi"
Sink the Bismarck!	1960	Lookout - Second Destroyer	Film, Uncredited
Skyport	1960	Saunders	1 episode
Caught in the Net	1960	Arnold	Film
The Old Pull 'n Push	1960	Percy Miller	2 episodes
Armchair Theatre	1960–1963	PC Robinson / First Policeman	2 episodes
Alcoa Presents: One Step Beyond	1961	Inspector	Episode: "The Tiger"
The Devil's Daffodil	1961	Mr. Osborne	Film, Uncredited
Nightfall at Kriekville	1961	Police Sergeant	TV film
The Escape of R.D.7	1961	Detective Sergeant Brady	2 episodes
A Chance of Thunder	1961	Powell	4 episodes
The Court Martial of Major Keller	1961	White	Film
The Man in the Back Seat	1961	Police Officer	Film, Uncredited
The Avengers	1961–1962	Detective Sergeant / Technician	2 episodes
No Hiding Place	1961–1963	Sergeant Clay / Bill Rogers	2 episodes
The Secret Thread	1962	Inspector	TV film
Looking About	1962	Tattersall	Episode: "Oakapple Day"
Play It Cool	1962	Mechanic #2	Film, Uncredited
Silent Evidence	1962	PC Snow	Episode: "The Chosen Instrument"
BBC Sunday-Night Play	1962	Inspector Dede / Anderson	2 episodes
A Prize of Arms	1962	Leigh	Film, Uncredited
The Sword in the Web	1962	Policeman	Episode: "The British Pilot"
Debbie Go Home	1962	Policeman	TV Short
Emergency Ward 10	1962–1963	Inspector Harris	3 episodes
Bootsie and Snudge	1963		Episode: "Silence in Court"
The Very Edge	1963	Policeman	Film
Maupassant	1963	Prussian Officer	Episode: "War"
Z-Cars	1963	Gould / Abraham Dancy	2 episodes
Dixon of Dock Green	1963–1964	Harold Fuller / Mr. Hope	2 episodes
It's Dark Outside	1964	Kletz	Episode: "A Case for Identification"
Detective	1964	Sergeant Summers	Episode: "End of Chapter"
Melissa	1964	Man at garage / George Antrobus	2 episodes
Festival	1964	Policeman	Episode: "Police"
Taxi!	1964	Sergeant Nobby Clarke	Episode: "Two-Five-Two"
Goldfinger	1964	Auric Goldfinger	Film, Voice, Uncredited
Thursday Theatre	1964	Harry Dodds	Episode: "Any Other Business"
The Plane Makers	1964	Sir Henry Manning	Episode: "A Question of Supply"
The Saint	1964	Borieff	Episode: "The Hi-Jackers"
Dr. Finlay's Casebook	1964-1965	Sergeant Mackie / Mr. Slorach	2 episodes
The Wednesday Play	1965	Police Sergeant	Episode: "A Tap on the Shoulder"
Danger Man	1965	Police Sergeant	Episode: "Whatever Happened to George Foster?"
Gideon's Way	1965	Det. Supt. Brown	Episode: "The Alibi Man"
Edgar Wallace Mysteries	1965	Sergeant Matson	Episode: Dead Man's Chest
Hereward the Wake	1965	Gareth	Episode: "A Champion's Reward"
A Study in Terror	1965	Max Steiner	Film, Voice, Uncredited
An Enemy of the State	1965	Presiding Judge	2 episodes
Court Martial	1965	Police Constable	Episode: "Without Spear or Sword"
The Newcomers	1965–1969	Jeff Langley	12 episodes
Comedy Playhouse	1970	Signpainter	Episode: "Keep 'Em Rolling"
W. Somerset Maugham	1970	District officer	Episode: "Flotsam and Jetsam"
The Main Chance	1970	Jack Gillam	Episode: "A Vision of the Future"
The Mind of Mr. J.G. Reeder	1971	Hallaty	Episode: "The Shadow Man"
Brett	1971	Porter	2 episodes
Bless This House	1972	Policeman	Episode: "Never Again on Sunday"
Follyfoot	1972	Garage Owner	Episode: "The Debt"
The Onedin Line	1972	Thompson	Episode: "A Woman Alone"
ITV Playhouse	1973	Ronnie Tucker	Episode: "The Team"
The Top Secret Life of Edgar Briggs	1974	Robinson	Episode: "The Traitor"
Journey into Fear	1975	Purser	Film
Bear Island	1979	Ship's Captain	Film
Overlanders	1979	Mr. Macleod	TV film, (final film role)
