= Ronnie Carroll =

Northern Irish singer (1934–2015)

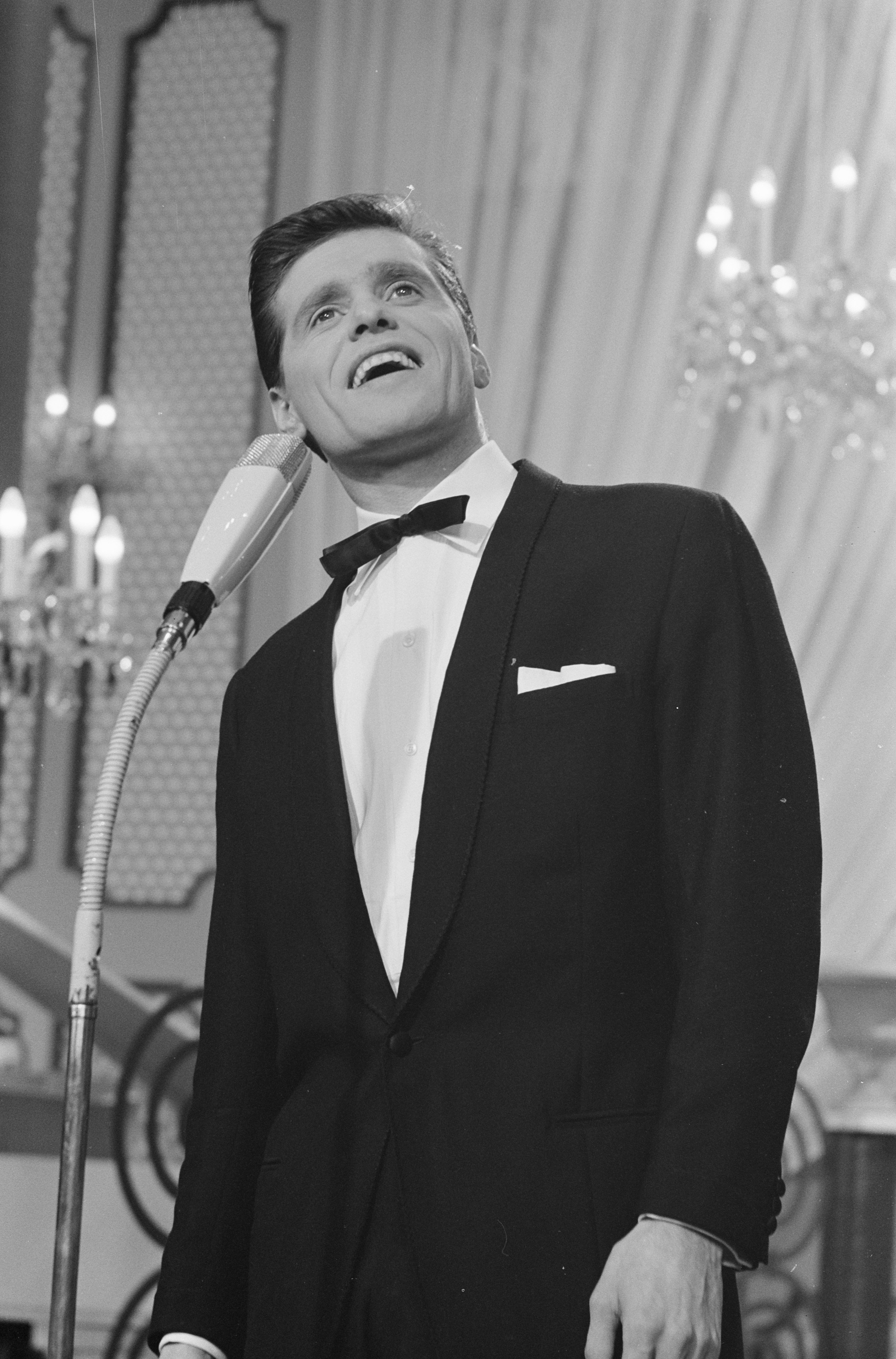
- Ronnie Carroll at the Eurovision Song Contest 1962

Background information
- Born: Ronald Cleghorn; 18 August 1934; Belfast, Northern Ireland
- Died: 13 April 2015 (aged 80) Hampstead, London, England
- Occupations: Singer, entertainer, and political candidate
- Instrument: Vocals
- Spouse: Millicent Martin (m. 1959; div. 1965); June Paul (m. 1970; div. 19??); Glenda Kentridge (m. 1982; div. 1994)

Ronnie Carroll (born Ronald Cleghorn; 18 August 1934 – 13 April 2015) was a Northern Irish singer, entertainer, and political candidate.

== Music career ==
Carroll was born Ronald Cleghorn in 1934 in Belfast, Northern Ireland, in 1934, the son of a plumber.

In January 1954, 19-year-old Ronnie Cleghorn was appearing in a variety show at the Town Hall, Portadown billed as Belfast's Nat King Cole and the show went on to play at several locations in Northern Ireland. Coming across to England, Cleghorn joined a show called "Hollywood Stars" at the Queen's in Blackpool in March 1954 in which the cast gave impressions of trans-Atlantic screen personalities. He sang in the style of Nat King Cole in blackface. Cleghorn adopted the stage name of "Carroll" in May 1954 and the show toured the UK for the next eighteen months. He made his first television appearance on BBC's "Camera One" on 10 January 1956 singing “Love Is a Many Splendored Thing”. He was given a recording contract by Philips Records and his first record "Last Love" was released on 1 February 1956. Carroll joined a touring show "New Faces of 1956" which began in Nottingham on 27 February 1956 and then he went into a radio show "Calling All Stars". Later that year, he was topping the bill on variety stages and his record “Walk Hand in Hand” was in the charts.

He is the only singer to have represented the UK in the Eurovision Song Contest two years in succession. Having taken part in the 1960 UK Eurovision selection contest with the song "Girl with a Curl", he returned to win the selection and be Britain's entry in the 1962 contest, and with the song "Ring-a-Ding Girl" shared fourth place, the same placing he reached in 1963 with "Say Wonderful Things". This success was followed by two Top 10 hits during 1962 and 1963, but a lack of good material meant that he could not sustain a chart presence. In 1962 he appeared on the bill of "The Winifred Atwell Show". From Monday 17 September 1962, for one week only, he gave twice-nightly performances at the Brighton Hippodrome.

Carroll then worked on cruise ships including the QE2, with John Marcangelo who was the drummer with the Ronnie Carroll Orchestra. Carroll played a pop musician named 'Ronnie' in the 1963 film Blind Corner. He had many guest appearances on hit TV shows in the 1960s and early 1970s, including The Morecambe & Wise Show and Sez Les.

In 2005, he released a comeback album, Back on Song.

== Political career ==
Carroll contested his home Hampstead and Highgate constituency seat in the 1997 UK General Election, and the Uxbridge by-election in July that year with the Rainbow Alliance. He stood in the 2008 Haltemprice and Howden by-election as a candidate for Make Politicians History and received 29 votes, despite announcing that he was trying to enter the record books by receiving no votes.

He ran as a candidate (under the name 'The Eurovisionary Carroll') for the 2015 general election, in the Hampstead and Kilburn constituency. Nominations had closed on 9 April 2015, just four days before his death, but polling day was not until 7 May. He was standing as an independent so the poll continued; if he had won the election, the ballot would have been re-run at a later date. In the event he polled 113 votes to finish sixth out of seven candidates.

== Personal life ==
Through work in variety theatre he met his first wife, Millicent Martin, they married in Barbados in 1958, remaining married until 1969. His company Ronnie Carroll Productions Ltd went into liquidation in 1969 after a petition from the Inland Revenue. He had suffered gambling losses of £170,000 in recent years.

His second wife was the Olympic runner June Paul and they married on 21 September 1970. They ran a successful nightclub in Grenada, which failed when there was a revolution and the airport runways were dug up, ending tourism for a time. He was first bankrupt in 1974 when his marriage to June Paul ended, Paul went on to own the "Everyman Cinema" in Hampstead. Carroll later married and divorced his third and last wife, Glenda Kentridge, from South Africa. In 1989 he was declared bankrupt for a second time, at one point running a food stall in Camden Market.

He lived his last years in Hampstead, north London and was a regular caller to radio phone-in shows on BBC London 94.9. He died in London on 13 April 2015, at age 80. He was survived by two sons with June and a daughter and son, his children with Glenda.

== Discography ==
=== Charted singles ===
- "Walk Hand in Hand" – (1956) – UK Singles Chart – No. 13
- "The Wisdom of a Fool" – (1957) – No. 20
- "Footsteps" – (1960) – No. 36
- "Ring-A-Ding Girl" – (1962) – No. 46
- "Roses Are Red" – (1962) – No. 3
- "If Only Tomorrow" – (1962) – No. 33
- "Say Wonderful Things" – (1963) – No. 6

=== LPs ===
- "Lucky Thirteen" (1958)
- "Sometimes I'm Happy, Sometimes I'm Blue" (1963)
- "Mr & Mrs Is the Name" (1964) (with Millicent Martin)
- "Carroll Calling" (1965)
- "Promises, Promises" (1969) (songs from the show with other singers)
- "Back on Song" (2005)

Awards and achievements
Preceded by The Allisons with "Are You Sure?"	United Kingdom in the Eurovision Song Contest; 1962, 1963	Succeeded by Matt Monro with "I Love the Little Things"
