= Say Wonderful Things (album) =

Studio album by Patti Page
- Released: August 1963
- Label: Columbia
- Producer: Robert Mersey

Patti Page chronology
Patti Sings Golden Hits of the Boys (1962)	Say Wonderful Things (1963)	Love After Midnight (1964)

Say Wonderful Things was a studio LP album by Patti Page, released by Columbia Records. It was released in August 1963 as a vinyl LP.

== Background ==
The album was Page's first LP for Columbia after her long and successful tenure on Mercury Records. The title song only reached No. 81 on the Billboard Hot 100, but was more successful in international markets such as Australia, Hong Kong and Japan.

== Chart performance ==
The album debuted on Billboard magazine's Top LP's chart in the issue dated September 21, 1963, peaking at No. 83 during a six-week run on the chart.

== Compact disc ==
It was re-released in compact disc form, combined with Patti Page's 1964 album, Love After Midnight, by Collectables Records, on November 25, 2003.

== Track listing ==
=== Side one ===
No.	Title	Writer(s)	Length
1.	"Fly Me to the Moon"	Bart Howard	2:57
2.	"The Good Life"	Sacha Distel, Jack Reardon	2:50
3.	"Love Letters"	Edward Heyman, Victor Young	2:44
4.	"Can't Get Used to Losing You"	Mort Shuman, Doc Pomus	2:31
5.	"Call Me Irresponsible"	Sammy Cahn, Jimmy Van Heusen	2:52
6.	"Say Wonderful Things"	Norman Newell, Philip Green	2:22

=== Side two ===
No.	Title	Writer(s)	Length
7.	"If and When"	Josef Myrow, Sammy Cahn	2:24
8.	"Days of Wine and Roses"	Henry Mancini, Johnny Mercer	2:54
9.	"I Wanna Be Around"	Sadie Vimmerstedt, Johnny Mercer	2:39
10.	"Moon River"	Henry Mancini, Johnny Mercer	2:49
11.	"The End of the World"	Sylvia Dee, Arthur Kent	2:57
12.	"Our Day Will Come"	Mort Garson, Bob Hilliard	2:57
