= John English (theatre director) =

English theatre director (1911–1998)

John English, OBE, MA (13 January 1911 – 20 December 1998), was a theatre director, actor, writer and entrepreneur in Birmingham, England, and the founder of the Highbury Theatre, the Midlands Arts Centre, as well as being one of the founding members of the Little Theatre Guild of Great Britain.

== Early years ==
John English was born in Dudley, Worcestershire (now West Midlands), on 13 January 1911. He is the child of Bertie and Emeline English, along with his sister Muriel May and his brother, Bill. He was educated at Dudley Grammar School until 1923 when the family moved to the Wylde Green area of Birmingham, where he went on to attend Bishop Vesey's Grammar School, leaving the school at age 16. From a young age, he was introduced to the arts and the theatre by both of his parents and would appear in numerous amateur theatre productions. It was here where he developed his craft and a keen eye for detail as both a director and as an actor.

In 1929, English began work as an industrial chemist at the Chance Brothers glassmakers, Smethwick, West Midlands. He later became the firm's production manager and stayed there for 20 years. In 1934, he married Doris Holt (a fellow Highbury member), who then became Mrs. Peta English. The couple divorced in 1959, the same year in which he married Alicia "Mollie" Randle. He retired from the industry in 1948 at the age of 40 to devote himself full-time to theatre. Shortly after retiring, he went on to found the Arena Theatre Company along with his new wife.

== Highbury Theatre ==
In 1924, English's father helped set up the Erdington ILP Play-reading Circle. When the circle began putting on plays, they rehearsed in the Englishes' house called Highbury (from which they later took their name when the ILP chose to rename themselves the Highbury Players). With his father directing the first few productions, a 14-year-old English acted as a stage manager. From its conception, English was one of the most prominent founding members of the then Highbury Little Theatre (latterly Highbury Theatre). He took over from his father as director of the Highbury Players at the age of 17 and later went on to become the theatre's first arts director in 1942. It was in 1929 that he directed his first full-length play, a modern-dress version of Shakespeare's Much Ado About Nothing. It was in his position as an arts director in which he helped to create and establish many of the features, rules, and traditions that are still used by the theatre to this day. He also served as an architect and supervised the building of the entire theatre from scratch, and did so for all subsequent alterations over the next 10 years. His quote of "a good theatre never stands still" is still the mantra that the theatre stands by, highlighting his impact and influence on the building and its members. His last role at the theatre was in 1947 in A Month in the Country. He retired from the position of being an arts director in 1963. During his time at the theatre, he directed and co-directed more than 100 productions.

== Arena Theatre Company ==
In 1948, he founded the Arena Theatre Company, which was a small, professional touring company which aimed to explore and develop how to introduce theatre to young people. Additionally, they strived to provide theatre to areas in both the city and across the country where theatre was less prominent, thus bringing it to the masses. As well as experimenting with new, different forms of theatre and presentation, they would perform "under canvas" (a circus tent) in the summer and with the help of the Arts Council, they were able to take performing arts to places that were devoid of a theatre. English's wife, Mollie Randle later mentioned in an interview that the Arena Theatre's main practice was "of touring Birmingham parks in the summer and halls around the country in the winter, the theatre performed a range of popular plays and classics for adults and children's plays". The first performance took place in Pype Hayes Park in August 1948, and their second in Sparkhill Park. They performed every summer in Cannon Hill Park from 1949 to 1961. However, in 1961, the company dissolved as the idea of a Midlands Arts Centre began to become a reality and they would return to Cannon Hill Park bigger than ever.

== Midlands Arts Centre ==
In 1960, English along with Mollie Randle and Councillor Sir Frank Price, composed a proposal for the creation of an arts centre in the city of Birmingham which they delivered to the members of the City Council. Between the three of them, they lobbied Birmingham City Council to assist them in their ambitious idea, to which in 1962, the council approved their proposal and responded with a substantial largesse; they donated a site in Cannon Hill Park for the sole use of the MAC; thus, the Midlands Arts Centre for Young People was born. The Englishes were heavily active in the amateur theatre scene within the city as a result of the Arena Theatre Company and their experiences during their time there in promoting the arts to a younger generation, in which the concept and ideals of a permanent arts centre became apparent. It would be a place to allow younger people to experience a wider range of art forms, as well as their practises and traditions. The building work was completed in the mid-1960s with the two small theatres and the studios making up what is now called the Midlands Arts Centre, making it the first centre of its kind in Britain. John English featured in a short Central Office of Information documentary in 1969 entitled The Pacemakers, where he discussed the origins of the MAC and its ever-changing programme. After 16 years at the helm, he retired from his role of director of the MAC in 1976.

== Later years ==
In his later years, English began to reduce his workload, but he still remained a prominent figure within the places he had founded and cultivated. His opinion was always sought on matters involving his beloved theatres and sat on the numerous boards of trustees up until his death. He directed his last production at the Highbury Theatre in 1992, where he staged his own version of Goldoni's Servant of Two Masters.

== Death ==
English died on 20 December 1998 after recent years of ill health, at the age of 87 at Good Hope Hospital, Sutton Coldfield. He asked that after his death, in lieu of flowers, donations should be made to the Highbury Theatre or the Midlands Arts Centre, these being two of the main cornerstones of his life. His portrait hangs in the foyer of the Highbury Theatre as a reminder of his devotion to the theatre and to the promotion of the arts, be it amateur or professional, in the city of Birmingham.

== Honours ==
- President of Highbury Theatre 1945–98
- Chairman of the Little Theatre Guild of Great Britain 1947–48
- Director of the Midlands Arts Centre 1960–76
- Presented with a Master of Arts (honoris causa) degree from Birmingham University in 1964
- Awarded an OBE in 1968 for services to the theatre
- He was the topic of a Central Office of Information documentary; The Pacemakers in 1969
- The Randle-English Studios were opened at the Midlands Arts Centre in October 1980
- Received the Gold Medal from the Birmingham Civic Society in 1981 for outstanding service to the community
