= The Escape of R.D.7 =

1961 British TV drama series

- Radio Times cover featuring the series along with another BBC serial A Chance of Thunder
- Genre: Science fiction drama
- Written by: Thomas Clarke
- Directed by: James Ormerod
- Starring: Barbara Murray; Jennifer Wright; Ellen Pollock
- Composer: Eric Spear
- Country of origin: United Kingdom
- Original language: English
- No. of series: 1
- No. of episodes: 5

Production
- Producer: James Ormerod
- Running time: 45 minutes
- Production company: BBC

Original release
- Network: BBC Television
- Release: 21 November – 19 December 1961

The Escape of R.D.7 is a British television series first broadcast in 1961. A serial, it was transmitted by the BBC in five episodes.

== Synopsis ==
Virologist Doctor Anna Hastings develops a R.D.7, a virus she believes will wipe out rats. After her laboratory is closed down after her assistant is injured, she continues her work on a remote location in the marshes of Essex but soon becomes concerned that virus is beginning to spread amongst humans.

== Main cast ==
- Barbara Murray as Dr Anna Hastings (5 episodes)
- Jennifer Wright as Peggy Butler (5 episodes)
- Ellen Pollock as Dr Mary Carter (5 episodes)
- Derek Waring as David Cardosa (5 episodes)
- Roger Croucher as Peter Warner (5 episodes)
- Edward Malin as Tucker (5 episodes)
- Doel Luscombe as Cafe proprietor (5 episodes)
- Nigel Arkwright as Mackie (5 episodes)
- Victor Platt as George Warner (4 episodes)
- Joan Newell as Mrs. Warner (4 episodes)
- Tony Bronte as Glass (4 episodes)
- Patrick Cargill as Patrice Constantine (3 episodes)
- John Dearth as Dr Protheroe (3 episodes)
- William Fox as Dr Harrington (3 episodes)
- Philip Holles as Dr Blenkinsop (3 episodes)
- Paul Eddington as Michael Rabinowitz (2 episodes)
- Robin Wentworth as PC Crabtree (2 episodes)
- Michael Collins as Det. Sgt. Brady (2 episodes)
- Austin Trevor as Sir Charles Delman (2 episodes)
- Alec Ross as Bannard (2 episodes)
- John Moore as Porter (2 episodes)
- Basil Beale as Alan Fry (2 episodes)
- Patrick Connor as PC Hanley (2 episodes)
- Raymond Hodge as Policeman (2 episodes)
- Soraya Rafat as Secretary (2 episodes)

== Series status ==
Due to the BBC archival policies at the time all 5 episodes were wiped from there archives and none of them are thought to have survived.

== Bibliography ==
- Baskin, Ellen. Serials on British Television, 1950-1994. Scolar Press, 1996.
- Fulton, Roger. The Encyclopedia of TV Science Fiction. Boxtree, 1990.
