= A Chance of Thunder =

British television series

- Radio Times cover featuring the series alongside The Escape of R.D.7
- Genre: Thriller
- Written by: John Hopkins
- Directed by: Peter Hammond
- Starring: Clifford Evans; John Meillon; Peter Vaughan
- Country of origin: United Kingdom
- Original language: English
- No. of series: 1
- No. of episodes: 6 (all missing)

Production
- Producer: Peter Hammond
- Running time: 30 minutes
- Production company: BBC

Original release
- Network: BBC Television
- Release: 22 November – 27 December 1961

A Chance of Thunder is a 1961 British six-part television series written by John Hopkins and produced by the BBC. It was transmitted in six episodes.

The BBC later wiped the series, and none of the six episodes are thought to survive.

== Cast ==
- Clifford Evans as Steven Prador
- John Meillon as Martin
- Peter Vaughan as Yardley
- Godfrey Quigley as DS Wilson
- Katherine Woodville as Pam Marchant
- Anthony Baird as Coryn
- Anthony Bate as Paul Rowlands
- Frank Gatliff as Trail
- Tom Adams as Evans
- Michael Collins as Powell
- Robert James as Hilton
- Ronald Lacey as Johnny Travers
- Michael Robbins as Mills
- Michael Rose as Taylor
- Peter Sallis as Howard
- Toke Townley as Frank White
- David Andrews as Alan Brewer
- Philip Stone as Ted Macauley
- Harvey Ashby as Scott
- Keith Barron as Bank Cashier
- Edward Brooks as PC Chatfield
- Billy Milton as Gerald Brewer
- Morris Perry as PC Milner
- Topsy Jane as Stella Fairly

== Bibliography ==
- Baskin, Ellen. Serials on British Television, 1950-1994. Scolar Press, 1996.
