= Say Wonderful Things (song) =

1963 single

Single by Ronnie Carroll
- Released: 1963
- Composer: Philip Green
- Lyricist: Norman Newell

Eurovision Song Contest 1963 entry
- Country: United Kingdom
- Artist: Ronnie Carroll
- Language: English
- Composer: Philip Green
- Lyricist: Norman Newell
- Conductor: Eric Robinson

Finals performance
- Final result: 4th
- Final points: 28 points

Entry chronology
- ◄ "Ring-A-Ding Girl" (1962)
- "I Love the Little Things" (1964) ►

"Say Wonderful Things" is a popular song with music by Philip Green and lyrics by Norman Newell, published in 1963. It was the represented the United Kingdom in the Eurovision Song Contest 1963, held in London. The singer was Ronnie Carroll, who also represented the UK the year before. The song finished fourth behind Denmark, Switzerland, and Italy; eventually reaching No. 6 in the UK Singles Chart.

The most popular version of the song in the United States was recorded by Patti Page, as the title song of her first album for Columbia Records. Page's record peaked only at No. 81 on the Billboard Hot 100, but was more successful in Australia, continental Europe and in Asian territories such as Hong Kong and Japan.

| Preceded by "Ring-A-Ding Girl" by Ronnie Carroll | United Kingdom in the Eurovision Song Contest; 1963 | Succeeded by "I Love the Little Things" by Matt Monro |
