= 1961 in the United Kingdom =

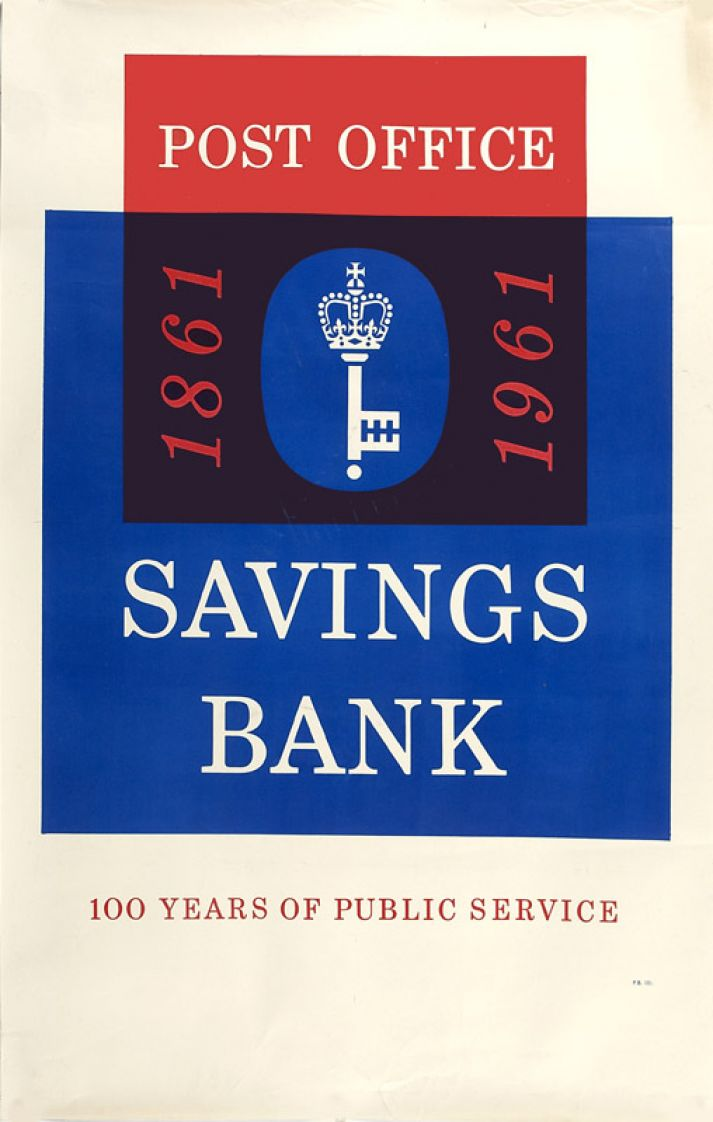

Events from the year 1961 in the United Kingdom.

== Incumbents ==
- Monarch – Elizabeth II
- Prime Minister – Harold Macmillan (Conservative)

== Events ==
=== January–March ===
- 1 January
  - The farthing coin, used since the thirteenth century, ceases to be legal tender in the United Kingdom.
  - The Conservative Monday Club is established.
  - Betting and Gaming Act 1960 comes into force, permitting operation of commercial bingo halls.
- 7 January
  - Members of the Soviet Portland spy ring are arrested in London (and charged 2 days later).
  - The Avengers television series first screened on ITV.
- 16 January – 12-year-old Linda Smith is murdered in Essex.
- 5 February – The Sunday Telegraph newspaper first published.
- 9 February – The Beatles at The Cavern Club: Lunchtime – The Beatles perform under this name at The Cavern Club for the first time following their return to Liverpool from Hamburg, George Harrison's first appearance at the venue. On 21 March they begin regular performances here; in June/July Stu Sutcliffe leaves the group; and on 9 November their future manager Brian Epstein sees them for the first time at The Cavern.
- 19 February – Police break up a demonstration outside the Belgian embassy in London protesting about the murder of the ex-Congolese Prime Minister, Patrice Lumumba.
- 8 March – Edwin Bush is arrested in London for the capital stabbing of Mrs. Elsie May Batten (for which he will be convicted and hanged). He is the first British criminal identified by the Identikit facial composite system.
- 9 March – "Water towers" speech: The Minister of Health, Enoch Powell, in a speech to a Conservative Party conference, proposes closing down of large, traditional psychiatric hospitals in favour of more community-based care.
- 13 March
  - The five members of the Portland spy ring go on trial at the Old Bailey accused of passing nuclear secrets to the Soviet Union.
  - Black and white £5 notes cease to be legal tender.
- 15 March – The Jaguar E-Type, a sports car capable of reaching speeds of 150 mph, is launched as a two-seater roadster or 2+2 coupé (at the Geneva Motor Show). On 3 April it makes its racing debut by winning at Oulton Park.
- 20 March – Shakespeare Memorial Theatre, Stratford-upon-Avon, becomes the Royal Shakespeare Theatre and its company the Royal Shakespeare Company (Peter Hall (director)).

=== April–June ===
- 1 April – The schoolboy character Winker Watson is introduced in The Dandy comic.
- 17 April – Tottenham Hotspur win the Football League First Division for the second time, with a 2–1 win over Sheffield Wednesday, an achievement they do not repeat.
- 27 April – Sierra Leone gains independence from the UK.
- 1 May
  - Betting shops become legal under terms of the Betting and Gaming Act 1960.
  - A fire at the Top Storey Club in Bolton results in nineteen deaths. A new Licensing Act is rapidly passed to improve fire safety.
- 2 May – The United Kingdom becomes a member of the OECD.
- 6 May – Tottenham Hotspur becomes the first English football team this century, and only the third in history, to win the double of the league title and FA Cup, with a 2–0 victory over Leicester City in the FA Cup Final. (The last previous team to achieve this were Aston Villa in 1897.)
- 8 May – George Blake is sentenced to 42 years imprisonment for spying, having been found guilty of being a double agent in the pay of the Soviet Union, the longest non-life sentence ever handed down by a British court.
- 17 May – Consecration of Guildford Cathedral.
- 28 May – Peter Benenson's article "The Forgotten Prisoners" is published in several internationally read newspapers. This will later be thought of as the founding of the human rights organisation Amnesty International.
- 8 June – Prince Edward, Duke of Kent, marries Katharine Worsley at York Minster.
- 14 June – The Government unveils new "panda" crossings with push button controls for pedestrians, due to concerns about the increasing volume of traffic. The new crossings first appear on British streets in April 1962.
- 19 June – The British protectorate ends in Kuwait and it becomes an emirate.
- 27 June
  - Michael Ramsey enthroned as the hundredth Archbishop of Canterbury, in succession to Geoffrey Fisher.
  - Kuwait requests help from the UK and British troops are sent.

=== July–September ===
- 4 July – Barclays open their "No. 1 Computer Centre" in Drummond Street, London, with an EMI mainframe computer, Britain's first bank with an in-house computing centre.
- 8 July – At an all-British women's final to The Championships, Wimbledon in tennis, Angela Mortimer beats Christine Truman.
- 21 July – The Runcorn Widnes Bridge (later known as the Silver Jubilee Bridge) over the River Mersey opened by Princess Alexandra.
- 25 July
  - The Government calls for a voluntary "pay pause" in wage increases (continuing to April 1962).
  - The Lancashire-set film Whistle Down the Wind, starring Hayley Mills and Alan Bates, opens.
- 3 August – Suicide Act 1961 decriminalises acts of, or attempts at suicide in England and Wales.
- 10 August – The UK applies for membership of the EEC.
- 16 August – The play Lady Chatterley by John Harte – based on D. H. Lawrence's novel – opens at the Arts Theatre in London and is well-reviewed by West End theatre critic Harold Hobson.
- 19–20 August – Race riots in Middlesbrough.
- 21 August – Goya's Portrait of the Duke of Wellington is stolen from the National Gallery in London, three weeks after first going on display there, intended as ransom in Kempton Bunton's campaign for free television licences for pensioners. It is returned 4 years later.
- 23 August – Police launch a manhunt for the perpetrator of the A6 murder, who shot dead 36-year-old Michael Gregsten and paralysed Valerie Storie.
- 25 August – Murder of Jacqueline Thomas: Police in Birmingham launch a murder inquiry after the strangled body of a missing teenager is found on an allotment in the Alum Rock area of the city. The probable murderer is not identified until 2007 but cannot be tried.
- 31 August – Premiere of the film Victim, notable as the first in English to use the word "homosexual".
- 4 September – James Pitman's Initial Teaching Alphabet is tested in a number of schools.
- 14 September
  - Film A Taste of Honey, including themes of interracial relationship, unmarried pregnancy and homosexuality, is released.
  - First Mothercare shop opens, as Mother-and-Child Centre in Kingston upon Thames.
- 16 September – Three people die and 35 are injured when a stand collapses during a Glasgow Rangers football match at Ibrox Park.
- 17 September – Police arrest over 1,300 protesters in Trafalgar Square during a CND rally.

=== October–December ===
- October – Acker Bilk's clarinet instrumental "Stranger on the Shore" is released.
- 1 October – Religious programme Songs of Praise first broadcast on BBC Television; it will still be running sixty years later.
- 9 October – Skelmersdale, a small Lancashire town fifteen miles north-east of Liverpool, is designated as a new town and its population will expand over the coming years, bolstered by large council housing developments to rehouse families from inner city slums on Merseyside.
- 10 October – A volcanic eruption on the South Atlantic British overseas territory of Tristan da Cunha causes the island's entire population to be evacuated to Surrey, where they will remain until 1963.
- 25 October – The first edition of Private Eye, the satirical magazine, is published in London.
- 8 November – In a referendum on Sunday opening of public houses in Wales, the counties of Anglesey, Cardiganshire, Caernarfonshire, Carmarthenshire, Denbighshire, Merionethshire, Montgomeryshire and Pembrokeshire all vote to stay "dry", that is, opposed to the Sunday sale of alcohol.
- 9 November – At the Lyceum Theatre, London, Miss United Kingdom, Welsh-born Rosemarie Frankland, becomes the first British winner of the Miss World beauty pageant.
- 27 November – The RAF participates in air drops of food to flood victims in Somalia.
- 4 December – Birth control pills become available to married women on the NHS after their availability is backed by Health Minister Enoch Powell.
- 9 December – Tanganyika gains independence from the United Kingdom.

=== Undated ===
- Park Hill Flats, Sheffield, opened.
- Release of short documentary film Seawards the Great Ships, which will be the first Scottish film to win an Academy Award.

== Publications ==
- Agatha Christie's novel The Pale Horse.
- Ian Fleming's James Bond novel Thunderball.
- Richard Hughes' novel The Fox in the Attic.
- John le Carré's first novel Call for the Dead, introducing the character George Smiley.
- Iris Murdoch's novel A Severed Head.
- Muriel Spark's short novel The Prime of Miss Jean Brodie.
- Derek Tangye's first novel Gull on the Roof, first of The Minack Chronicles.
- Evelyn Waugh's novel Unconditional Surrender, last of the Sword of Honour trilogy.
- Raymond Williams's cultural history The Long Revolution.
- Parker Morris Committee's report Homes for Today and Tomorrow.

== Births ==
=== January–April ===
- 1 January
  - Fiona Phillips, journalist and television presenter
  - Mark Wingett, British actor
- 2 January – Neil Dudgeon, English actor
- 6 January – Peter Whittle, British politician, author, journalist and broadcaster
- 8 January – Keith Arkell, English chess player
- 11 January – Jasper Fforde, fantasy novelist
- 12 January
  - Sean Blowers, actor
  - Simon Russell Beale, actor, born in Malaysia
- 13 January
  - Wayne Marshall, musician
  - Suggs, British ska singer (Madness)
- 16 January – Peter Tanfield, concert violinist
- 18 January – Peter Beardsley, English footballer and football coach
- 19 January – Wayne Hemingway, English designer
- 20 January – Janey Godley, Scottish comedian and writer (died 2024)
- 27 January – Gillian Gilbert, new wave keyboard player
- 31 January – Lloyd Cole, English rock singer-songwriter
- 14 February – Alison Saunders, Director of Public Prosecutions (England and Wales)
- 16 February – Andy Taylor, English rock guitarist and musician (Duran Duran)
- 17 February
  - Angela Eagle, politician, Shadow Leader of the House of Commons
  - Maria Eagle, politician, Shadow Secretary of State for Transport
- 19 February – Justin Fashanu, black British footballer (suicide 1998)
- 20 February – Imogen Stubbs, British actress
- 24 February – John Grogan, British Labour politician
- 1 March – Michael Sundin, trampolinist and television presenter (died 1989)
- 3 March – Fatima Whitbread, British javelin thrower and Olympic medallist
- 12 March – Betty Sworowski, English racewalker
- 14 March – Marc Koska, English businessman and inventor
- 22 March
  - Simon Furman, comic book writer
  - Giles Worsley, English architectural historian (died 2006)
- 26 March – William Hague, British statesman
- 27 March – Ellery Hanley, English rugby league footballer and coach
- 29 March – Michael Winterbottom, British filmmaker
- 1 April
  - Susan Boyle, Scottish singer
  - Edward Dutkiewicz, British visual artist (died 2007)
- 3 April – Edward Highmore, English actor
- 6 April – Rory Bremner, impressionist, comedian and playwright
- 10 April – Nicky Campbell, broadcaster
- 11 April – Nigel Pulsford, rock guitarist and musician (Bush)
- 14 April – Robert Carlyle, Scottish actor
- 16 April – Linda Ruth Williams, film studies academic
- 17 April – Bella Freud, British fashion designer and columnist
- 18 April – Jane Leeves, English-born actress
- 19 April – Richard Phelps, English pentathlete
- 20 April – Nicholas Lyndhurst, English actor
- 28 April – Grenville Davey, English sculptor

=== May–August ===
- 2 May
  - Steve James, English snooker player
  - Phil Vickery, celebrity chef
- 4 May
  - Jay Aston, English pop singer
  - Chris Packham, naturalist and television presenter
- 7 May – Sue Black, forensic anthropologist
- 8 May – Janet McTeer, actress
- 12 May – Billy Duffy, English hard rock guitarist (The Cult)
- 14 May
  - Ian Blackford, Scottish politician
  - Tim Roth, English actor
- 15 May – Katrin Cartlidge, actress (died 2002)
- 20 May – Clive Allen, footballer
- 28 May – Roland Gift, rock singer (Fine Young Cannibals)
- 30 May – Harry Enfield, English comedian
- 3 June – Ed Wynne, psychedelic rock guitarist (Ozric Tentacles)
- 5 June – Rosie Kane, member of Scottish Parliament
- 6 June – George Mountbatten, 4th Marquess of Milford Haven, English polo player and businessman
- 10 June – Maxi Priest, born Max Elliott, reggae singer
- 12 June – Angie Hobbs, philosopher
- 13 June – Bob Crow, trade union leader (died 2014)
- 14 June – Boy George (O'Dowd), English new wave singer-songwriter
- 15 June
  - Dave McAuley, Northern Irish boxer
- 17 June – Muslimgauze, ethnic electronica and experimental musician (died 1999)
- 18 June – Alison Moyet, English new wave singer-songwriter
- 22 June
  - Stephen Batchelor, English field hockey player and coach
  - Bobby Gillespie, Scottish singer-songwriter
- 24 June
  - Iain Glen, Scottish actor
  - Curt Smith, pop-rock singer-songwriter-keyboardist
- 25 June – Ricky Gervais, English comedian
- 26 June – Margaret McDonagh, Baroness McDonagh, politician (died 2023)
- 27 June
  - Meera Syal, comic actress and writer
  - Tim Whitnall, English playwright, screenwriter and actor
- 1 July
  - Diana, Princess of Wales, (died 1997)
  - Ivan Kaye, English actor
- 3 July – Suzanne Dando, English Olympic gymnast
- 5 July – Gareth Jones, Welsh television presenter
- 8 July – Andy Fletcher, English musician (died 2022)
- 10 July
  - Carol Anne Davis, Scottish crime writer
  - Ian Mercer, English actor
- 12 July – Mark McGann, English actor, director, writer and musician
- 16 July – Andrew Watson, English Anglican bishop (died 2026)
- 17 July – Jeremy Hardy, English comedian and broadcaster (died 2019)
- 24 July – Vicki Pepperdine, English comedy actress and writer
- 26 July – David Heyman, English film producer (Heyday Films)
- 31 July – Frank Gardner, English journalist
- 3 August – Nick Harvey, English politician
- 5 August – Janet McTeer, English actress
- 7 August
  - Brian Conley, English comedian, television presenter, singer and actor
  - Walter Swinburn, English flat racing jockey and trainer (died 2016)
- 8 August
  - The Edge (David Howell Evans), rock guitarist
  - Simon Weston, Welsh war hero
- 12 August – Lawrence (Hayward), alternative rock musician
- 16 August
  - Saskia Reeves, actress
  - Angela Smith, academic and politician
- 18 August – Huw Edwards,Former Welsh television journalist and Former news presenter
- 20 August – Joe Pasquale, English comedian
- 22 August
  - Iain Coucher, English businessman
  - Roland Orzabal, English singer-songwriter (Tears for Fears)
- 23 August – Gary Mabbutt, footballer
- 24 August – Jared Harris, English actor
- 29 August – Dale Vince, green energy industrialist

=== September–December ===
- 7 September – Kevin Kennedy, actor
- 13 September – Tom Holt, author
- 20 September – Caroline Flint, English Labour politician
- 22 September – Liam Fox, Conservative politician, Defence Secretary
- 24 September – Jack Dee, comedian
- 25 September – Steve Scott, journalist and presenter
- 26 September – Will Self, English novelist, reviewer and columnist
- 29 September – Julia Gillard, Welsh-born Prime Minister of Australia
- 30 September – Mel Stride, English Conservative politician
- 9 October – Julian Bailey, Formula 1 driver
- 10 October – Martin Kemp, actor and musician
- 11 October – Neil Buchanan, English television presenter
- 13 October – Rachel De Thame, English gardener and television presenter
- 14 October – Jim Burns, British science-fiction illustrator
- 16 October – Paul Vaessen, English footballer (died 2001)
- 19 October – Jayne-Anne Gadhia, businesswoman
- 20 October – Ian Rush, Welsh footballer and football manager
- 25 October – Pat Sharp, English radio DJ
- November – Sarah Holland, romantic novelist, actress and singer
- 3 November – David Armstrong-Jones, 2nd Earl of Snowdon, chairman of Christie's U.K. auction house
- 4 November – Nigel Worthington, Northern Irish footballer and football manager
- 9 November
  - Jill Dando, television newsreader (murdered 1999)
  - Jackie Kay, Scottish poet and novelist
- 16 November – Frank Bruno, British boxer
- 18 November – Steven Moffat, Scottish screenwriter
- 20 November – Dave Watson, English footballer
- 22 November – Stephen Hough, classical pianist
- 25 November – Simon Fisher-Becker, actor
- 26 November
  - Karan Bilimoria, Baron Bilimoria, British Asian entrepreneur and university chancellor
  - Helen Browning, farmer
- 28 November – Martin Clunes, actor
- 4 December – Gerard Woodward, British novelist and poet
- 5 December – Laura Flanders, British-born American journalist
- 11 December – Marco Pierre White, chef and restaurateur
- 12 December
  - Philip Parkin, Welsh golfer
  - Sarah Sutton, British actress
- 19 December – Matthew Waterhouse, British actor
- 20 December – Keith Brown, Scottish politician
- 23 December – Carol Smillie, Scottish television presenter
- 24 December – Simon Woolley, Baron Woolley of Woodford, political activist and life peer
- 28 December – Helen Newlove, Baroness Newlove, community activist and life peer (died 2025)
- 29 December – Jim Reid, Scottish alternative rock singer-songwriter
- 31 December
  - Sharon Gibson, English javelin thrower
  - Jeremy Heywood, Cabinet Secretary and Head of the Home Civil Service (died 2018)

=== Unknown dates ===
- Sexton Ming, British artist, poet and musician
- Winsome Pinnock, black British playwright

== Deaths ==
- 26 January – Stan Nichols, English cricketer (born 1900)
- 30 January – John Duncan Fergusson, Scottish Colourist painter (born 1874)
- 4 February – Sir Philip Game, British Army officer, colonial governor and police officer (born 1876)
- 6 February – Lawrence Dundas, 2nd Marquess of Zetland, English politician (born 1876)
- 6 March – George Formby, Lancashire comic singer and performer (born 1904)
- 8 March – Sir Thomas Beecham, English orchestral conductor (born 1879)
- 12 March
  - Victor d'Arcy, English sprinter (born 1887)
  - Belinda Lee, English screen actress, killed in automobile accident in the United States (born 1935)
- 18 March – E. Arnot Robertson, English novelist (born 1903)
- 7 April – Vanessa Bell, English artist and interior designer, member of the Bloomsbury Group (born 1879)
- 9 April – Oliver Onions (George Oliver), English novelist and ghost story writer (born 1873)
- 10 April – Sir John Hope Simpson, English public servant and politician (born 1868)
- 13 April – Dickie Dale, English motorcycle road racer, died as result of racing accident in Germany (born 1927)
- 22 April – Joanna Cannan, English pony book writer and detective novelist (born 1896)
- 4 June – William Astbury, English physicist and molecular biologist (born 1898)
- 28 June – Huw Menai, Welsh poet (born 1886)
- 3 September – Richard Mason, English explorer, killed in Brazil (born 1935)
- 27 September – Bentley Purchase, London coroner (born 1890)
- 1 October – Sir William Reid Dick, Scottish sculptor (born 1879)
- 13 October
  - Augustus John, Welsh painter (born 1878)
  - John MacCormick, Scottish lawyer (born 1904)
- 14 October – Harriet Shaw Weaver, English political activist (born 1876)
- 3 November – Thomas Flynn, English Roman Catholic bishop of Lancaster (born 1880)
- 25 November – Adelina de Lara, English classical pianist and composer (born 1872)
- 2 December – Herbert Pitman, English merchant seaman, third officer on RMS Titanic (born 1877)
- 24 December – Charles Hamilton, prolific English children's story writer (born 1876)

== See also ==
- 1961 in British music
- 1961 in British television
- List of British films of 1961
- 1961 United Kingdom local elections
