= Are You Sure? (The Allisons song) =

1961 single by The Allisons

Single by The Allisons
- B-side: "There's One Thing More"
- Released: February 1961
- Genre: Pop
- Length: 2:05
- Label: Fontana Records
- Songwriters: John Allison; Bob Day

The Allisons singles chronology
"Are You Sure?" (1961)	"Words" (1961)

Eurovision Song Contest 1961 entry
- Country: United Kingdom
- Artists: John Allison; Bob Day
- As: The Allisons
- Language: English
- Composers: John Allison; Bob Day
- Lyricists: John Allison; Bob Day
- Conductor: Harry Robinson

Finals performance
- Final result: 2nd
- Final points: 24

Entry chronology
- ◄ "Looking High, High, High" (1960)
- "Ring-A-Ding Girl" (1962) ►

"Are You Sure?" is a song by British pop duo The Allisons, that represented the United Kingdom at the Eurovision Song Contest 1961, performed in English.

The song was performed 15th on the night of the contest, held on 18 March 1961, following Luxembourg's Jean-Claude Pascal with "Nous les amoureux", and preceding Italy's Betty Curtis with "Al di là". The song received 24 points, placing 2nd in a field of 16, the third consecutive second place Eurovision finish for the UK for whom two subsequent Eurovision entrants would also be second-place finishers before "Puppet on a String" by Sandie Shaw would give the UK its first Eurovision victory in 1967. "Are You Sure?" was also the first UK Eurovision entrant to become a Top Ten hit reaching #2, the best chart showing for a UK Eurovision entrant until "Puppet on a String" by Sandie Shaw reached No. 1 in 1967. Additionally, it was the 39th highest-selling single of the 1960s in the UK.

The song was succeeded as the UK representative at the 1962 contest by Ronnie Carroll with "Ring-A-Ding Girl".

== Chart performance ==
Chart (1961)	Peak position
United Kingdom (Record Retailer)	2
United Kingdom (NME)	1
United Kingdom (Record Mirror)	1
U.S. Billboard	102
