= Mac, Birmingham =

Arts centre in Birmingham, England

Midlands Arts Centre (MAC)
- MAC
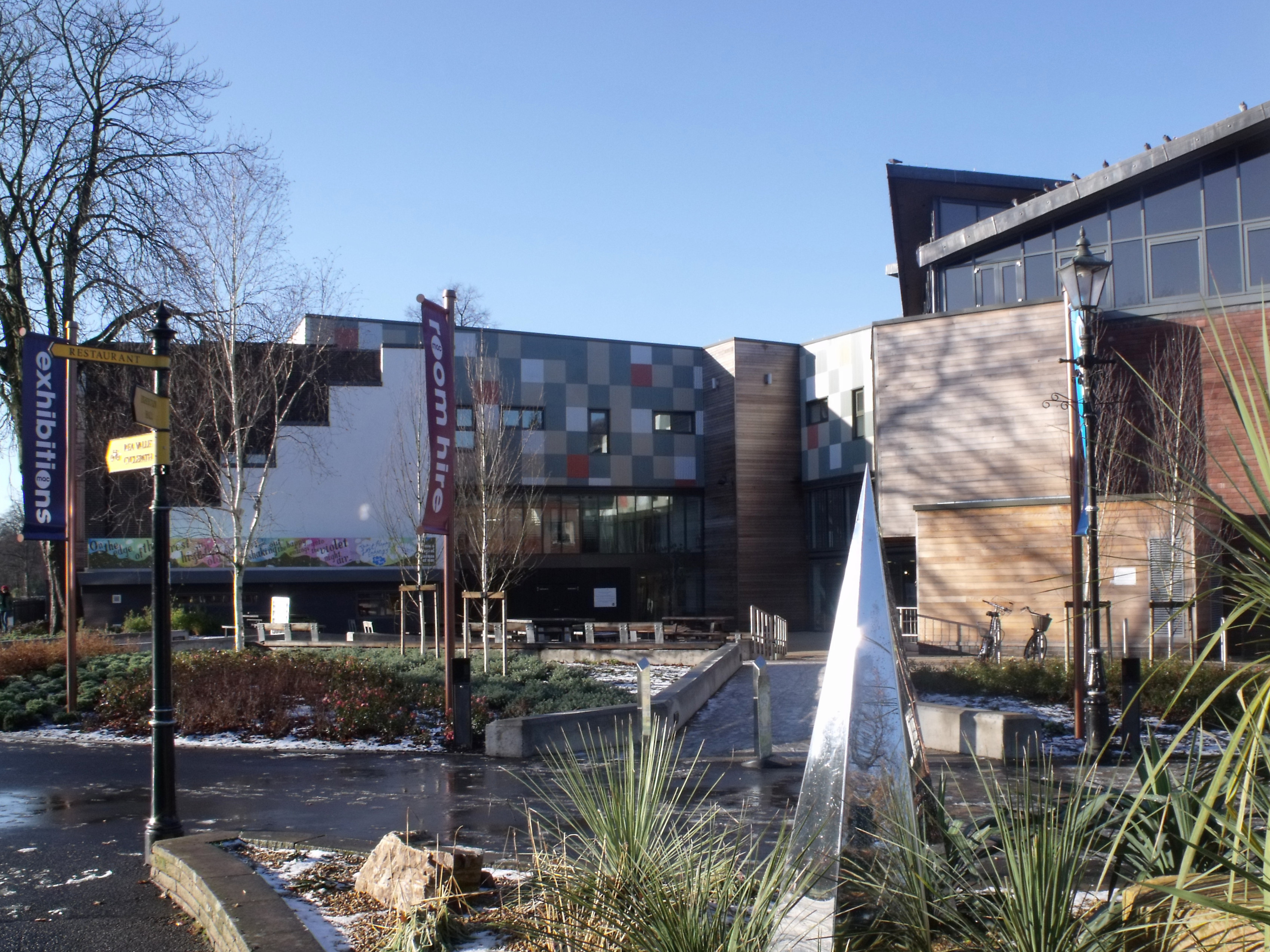
- Interactive map of Midlands Arts Centre (MAC)
- Former names: Midlands Arts Centre
- Location: Cannon Hill Park, Edgbaston, Birmingham, England
- Coordinates: 52.4529°N 1.9039°W
- Type: Non-profit arts centre
- Events: Art Exhibitions, Indie Cinema, Live Performances, Creative Courses, Restaurant and Bar

Construction
- Opened: 1962; 64 years ago
- Renovated: May 2010

Website
- https://macbirmingham.co.uk/

Midlands Arts Centre (also known as MAC or MAC Birmingham) is a non-profit arts centre situated in Cannon Hill Park, Edgbaston, Birmingham, England. It was established in 1962 and is registered as an educational charity which hosts art exhibitions, independent cinema, live performances and creative courses for all ages.

The centre re-opened in May 2010 after a £15m facelift. It has four performance auditoria, rehearsal and media studios, a cinema, café, bar and art gallery. As of 2024, the centre saw 786,694 visits.

== History ==
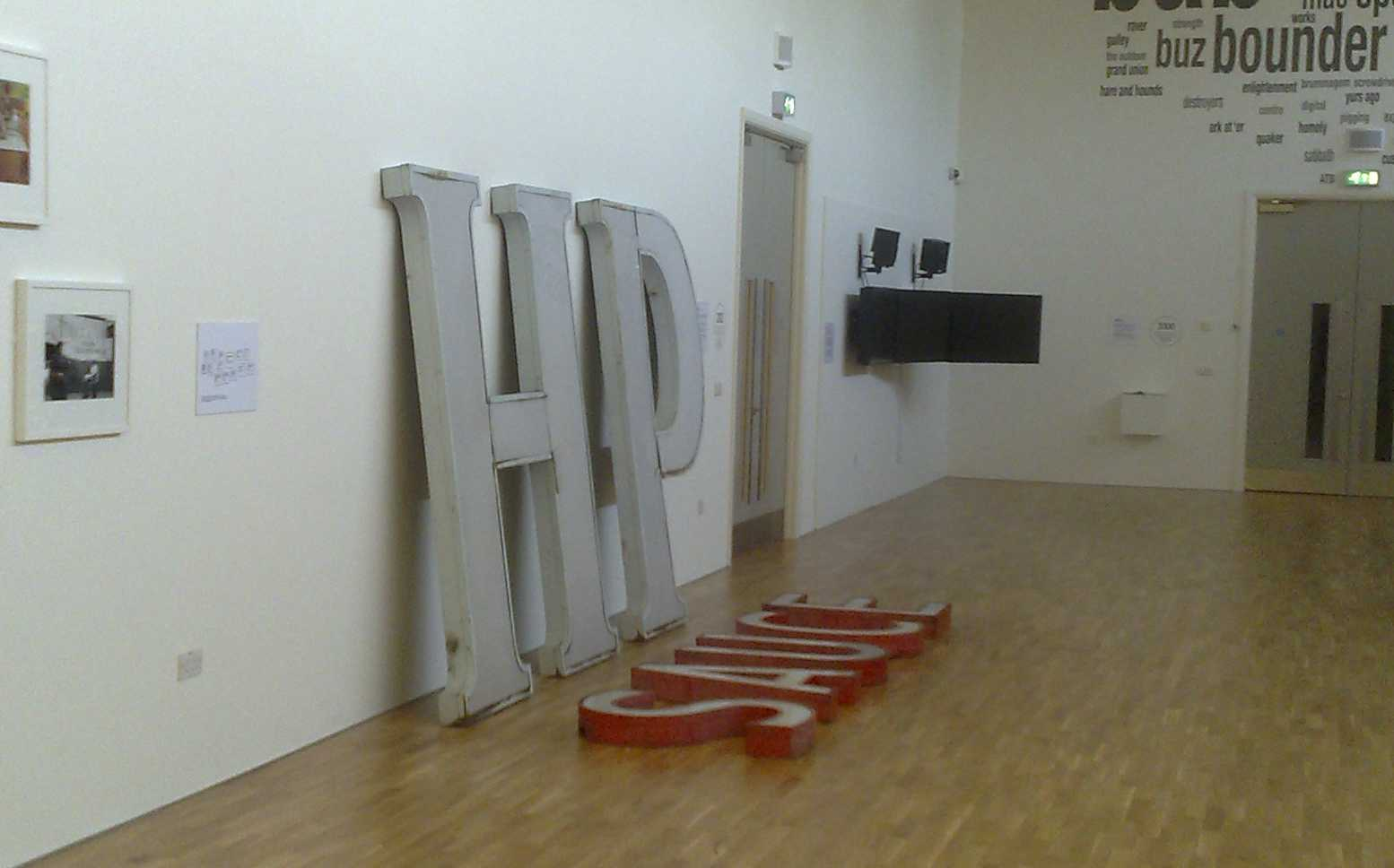
Signage from the defunct HP Sauce factory in Aston, exhibited at the new mac in June 2010.

The idea for an arts centre in Cannon Hill Park was the result of a meeting between local residents: theatre writer and director John English, his wife, Mollie Randle, and local politician Frank Price in the late 1950s. Eventually 8.6 acres (3.5 ha) of land in Cannon Hill Park was made available by Birmingham City Council in 1962 for this purpose. It also housed the Cannon Hill Puppet Theatre under John M. Blundall. The foundation stone for the new arts centre was laid on 19 June 1962 by six people representing those for whom the centre was intended.

In 1965 director Mike Leigh went to work at the theatre and started experimenting with the idea that writing and rehearsing could potentially be part of the same process. Between 1972 and 1987 it was the home of the former Birmingham Youth Theatre, a company aimed at encouraging and nurturing talent amongst people aged 15 to 23 who were not involved with drama or theatre. This company was founded by local teacher Derek Nicholls, who later became Director of the mac. Adrian Lester and Andrew Tiernan began their careers there.

Other artists who performed here include Yoko Ono, Kate Malone, and Ewen Henderson; and renowned musicians and bands such as Ruby Turner, Ocean Colour Scene, UB40, and ELO played at MAC in the early stages of their career. Indian classical dancer Nahid Siddiqui taught Kathak classes here, and famous Bharatanatyam exponent Chitra Bolar started teaching at MAC in 1978. Their contributions established MAC as a centre for South Asian dance and performing arts.

The centre closed from April 2008 to 1 May 2010 for a £14.8 million refurbishment. MAC had 1.7 million visitors in the subsequent two years.

In 2021, MAC received £1.7 million of development investment, including for a new café and restaurant.

In 2023, potentially dangerous RACC concrete was found in the roof, causing the temporary closure of the theatre and some studios.
