= The Allisons =

English pop duo

- Origin: England
- Genres: Pop
- Years active: 1961–1963
- Label: Fontana Records
- Past members: John Allison (John Alford), Bob Day

The Allisons were an English pop duo consisting of Bob Day (born Bernard Colin Day; 2 February 1941 – 25 November 2013) and John Alford (born Brian Henry John Alford, 31 December 1939 – 13 November 2023). They were marketed as being brothers, using the surname of Allison.

== Career ==
The Allisons represented the United Kingdom in the Eurovision Song Contest 1961 with the song "Are You Sure?" written by John Alford/Allison. They came second with 24 points. The song was released as a single on the Fontana label, and climbed to number 1 on the UK NME pop chart, while in the chart compiled by the Official Charts Company the song spent six weeks at number 2 and a further three weeks in the top 4. "Are You Sure" sold over one million records, earning a gold disc. In Germany the single reached number 11. Despite a couple of minor follow-up hits, the duo disbanded in 1963.

Alford initially tried songwriting, but he and Day teamed up for short tours to keep the 'Allisons' name alive. Additionally, in the 1970s and 1980s Alford was joined by other "brothers" — Mike "Allison" and Tony "Allison". By the 1990s, Day and Alford regularly reunited to perform on the oldies circuit.

The Allisons' final public performance was at the "Tales from the Woods" British R'n'Roll Heritage Show No. 8 at The Borderline Club in London, in 2012. A clip from that show can be found on the 'Tales From The Woods' YouTube channel.

Bob Day died after a long illness on 25 November 2013, at the age of 72. John Alford died from complications of an aortic dissection on 13 November 2023, at the age of 83.

== Discography ==
=== Albums ===
Year	Title	UK	Record label
1961	Are You Sure	—	Fontana Records

=== Singles ===
Year	Title	US	UK	Record label	B-side
1961	"Are You Sure?"	102	2	Fontana Records	"There's One Thing More"
1961	"Words"	—	34	Fontana Records	"Blue Tears"
1961	"What a Mess"	—	—	Fontana Records	"Lorraine"
1962	"Lessons in Love"	—	30	Fontana Records	"Oh, My Love"
1962	"I'll Cross My Fingers"	—	—	Fontana Records	"You Should Be Sorry"

Awards and achievements
Preceded by Bryan Johnson with "Looking High, High, High"	United Kingdom in the Eurovision Song Contest; 1961	Succeeded by Ronnie Carroll with "Ring-A-Ding Girl"
