= Germany in the Eurovision Song Contest 1962 =

- Eurovision Song Contest 1962
- Participating broadcaster: ARD (Note: Arbeitsgemeinschaft der öffentlich-rechtlichen Rundfunkanstalten der Bundesrepublik Deutschland) – Südwestfunk (SWF)
- Country: Germany
- Selection process: Deutschen Schlager-Festspiele 1962
- Selection date: 17 February 1962

Competing entry
- Song: "Zwei kleine Italiener"
- Artist: Conny Froboess
- Songwriters: Christian Bruhn; George Buschor

Placement
- Final result: 6th, 9 points

Participation chronology

Germany was represented at the Eurovision Song Contest 1962 with the song "Zwei kleine Italiener", composed by Christian Bruhn, with lyrics by George Buschor, and performed by Conny Froboess. The German participating broadcaster on behalf of ARD, Südwestfunk (SWF), selected its entry through a national final.

Twelve artists and 24 songs took part in the German preselection, which consisted of four semi-finals, followed by the final on 17 February. Each show was held in a different German city. There were several past and future Eurovision representatives among the participants: Wyn Hoop (Germany 1960), Siw Malmkvist (Sweden 1960 and Germany 1969), Jimmy Makulis (Austria 1961), Carmela Corren (Austria 1963) and Margot Eskens (Germany 1966).

== Before Eurovision ==
=== National final ===
==== Semi-finals ====
Four semi-finals were held to select the 12 qualifiers for the final. Each artist performed two songs and a jury selected which of the two should go forward to the final.

===== Semi-final 1 - Frankfurt =====
Semi-final 1 – 12 January 1962
R/O	Artist	Song	Result
1	Conny Froboess	"Hallo hallo hallo"	—N/a
2	Conny Froboess	"Zwei kleine Italiener"	Qualified
3	Rita Paul	"Canzonetta d'amore"	—N/a
4	Rita Paul	"La luna romantica"	Qualified
5	Jimmy Makulis	"Ich habe im Leben nur Dich"	Qualified
6	Jimmy Makulis	"Keiner weiß wohin"	—N/a

===== Semi-final 2 - Stuttgart =====
Semi-final 2 – 19 January 1962
R/O	Artist	Song	Result
1	Peter Beil	"Dein erster Kuß"	—N/a
2	Peter Beil	"Ein verliebter Italiener"	Qualified
3	Peggy Brown	"Das Lexikon d'amour"	Qualified
4	Peggy Brown	"Ein Wiederseh'n mit Jacky"	—N/a
5	Siw Malmkvist	"Der eine, der bist Du"	—N/a
6	Siw Malmkvist	"Die Wege der Liebe (sind wunderbar)"	Qualified

===== Semi-final 3 - Cologne =====
Semi-final 3 – 26 January 1962
R/O	Artist	Song	Result
1	Pirkko Mannola & Wyn Hoop	"Komm ein bißchen näher zu mir her"	—N/a
2	Pirkko Mannola & Wyn Hoop	"Mama will dich sehen"	Qualified
3	Ralf Bendix	"Das Neueste aus Paris"	—N/a
4	Ralf Bendix	"Spanische Hochzeit"	Qualified
5	Margot Eskens	"Ein Herz das kann man nicht kaufen"	Qualified
6	Margot Eskens	"Jeder braucht jeden Tag Liebe"	—N/a

===== Semi-final 4 - Munich =====
Semi-final 4 – 2 February 1962
R/O	Artist	Song	Result
1	Carmela Corren	"Eine Rose aus Santa Monica"	Qualified
2	Carmela Corren	"Irgendwie geht es immer weiter"	—N/a
3	Bill Ramsey	"Hilly Billy Banjo Bill"	Qualified
4	Bill Ramsey	"Old Jonny war ein Wunderkind"	—N/a
5	Ann-Louise Hanson	"Au revoir, auf wiederseh'n"	—N/a
6	Ann-Louise Hanson	"Sing kleiner Vogel"	Qualified

==== Final ====
The national final was held on 17 February at the Kurhaus in Baden-Baden, hosted by Klaus Havenstein. The winning song was chosen by voting from six regional juries and an additional jury in the theatre.

Final – 17 February 1962
R/O	Artist	Song	Points	Place
1	Conny Froboess	"Zwei kleine Italiener"	19	1
2	Rita Paul	"La luna romantica"	2	6
3	Jimmy Makulis	"Ich habe im Leben nur Dich"	0	11
4	Peter Beil	"Ein verliebter Italiener"	0	11
5	Peggy Brown	"Das Lexicon d'amour"	2	6
6	Siw Malmkvist	"Die Wege der Liebe (sind wunderbar)"	18	2
7	Pirkko Mannola & Wyn Hoop	"Mama will dich sehen"	6	4
8	Ralf Bendix	"Spanische Hochzeit"	5	5
9	Margot Eskens	"Ein Herz das kann man nicht kaufen"	8	3
10	Carmela Corren	"Eine Rose aus Santa Monica"	1	8
11	Bill Ramsey	"Hilly Billy Banjo Bill"	1	8
12	Ann-Louise Hanson	"Sing kleiner Vogel"	1	8

== At Eurovision ==
On the night of the final Froboess performed 7th in the running order, following Sweden and preceding the Netherlands. "Zwei kleine Italiener" was one of very few fun, uptempo songs in what in retrospect is usually rated as one of the dreariest contests of all. Each national jury awarded 3-2-1 to their top three songs, and at the close of voting "Zwei kleine Italiener" had received 9 points, placing Germany 6th of the 16 entries. The German jury awarded its 3 points to contest winners France.

=== Voting ===
Points awarded to Germany
Score	Country
3 points	
2 points	Finland; Monaco; Netherlands; United Kingdom
1 point	Denmark

Points awarded by Germany
Score	Country
3 points	France
2 points	Switzerland
1 point	Monaco
