= Víctor Balaguer (singer) =

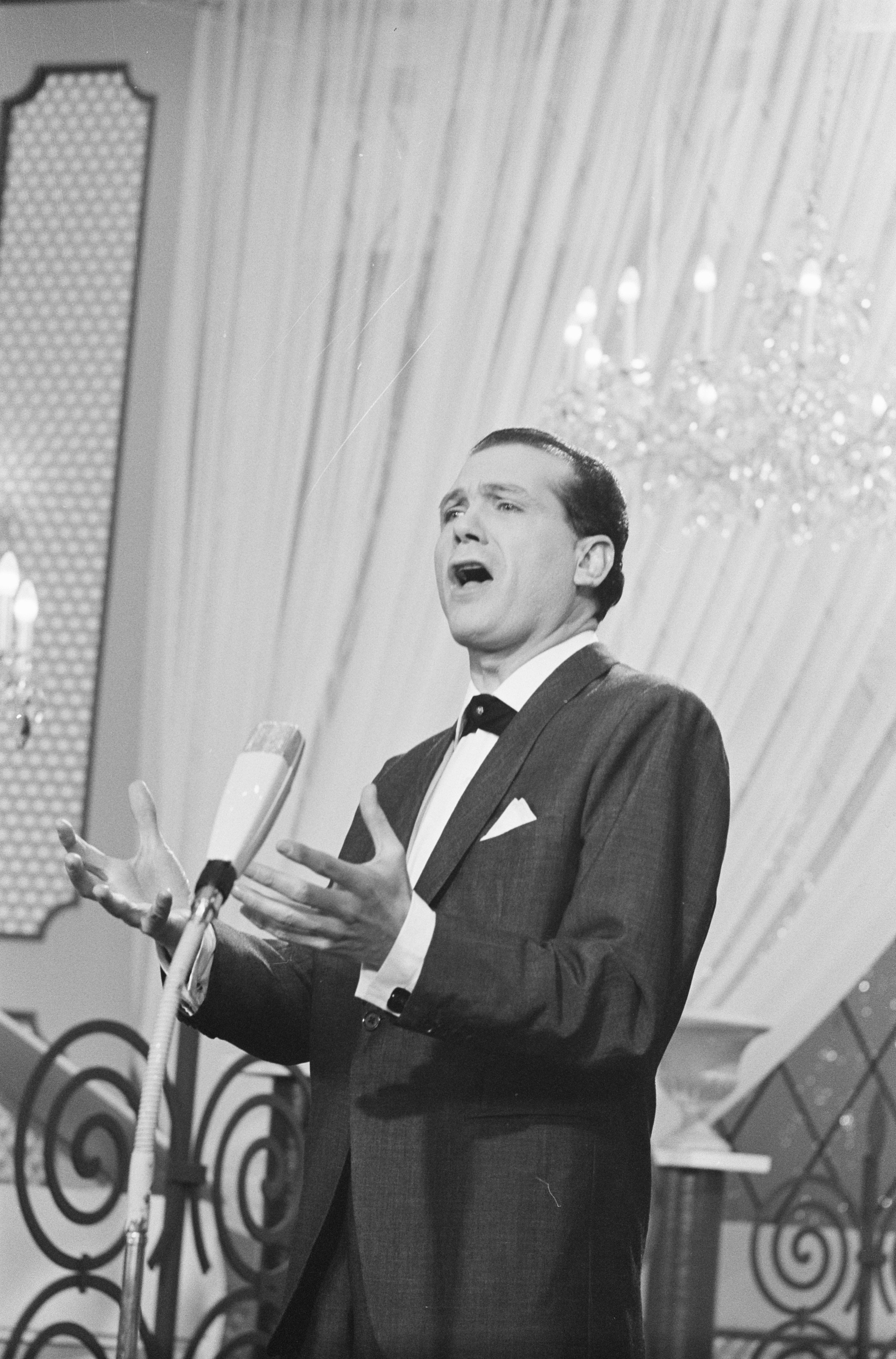
- Victor Balaguer at the Eurovision Song Contest 1962

Background information
- Born: 24 March 1921; Barcelona, Spain
- Died: 17 April 1984 (aged 63) Barcelona, Spain
- Genres: Pop, Zarzuela
- Occupation: Singer

Víctor Balaguer (Spanish pronunciation: [ˈbiɣtoɾ βalaˈɣeɾ]; 24 March 1921 – 17 April 1984) was a Spanish singer of the 1950s and 1960s. Balaguer was known as a versatile singer who moved between popular music and zarzuela, singing in both Spanish and Catalan. He represented Spain in the Eurovision Song Contest 1962.

Balaguer was born and died in Barcelona. On 13–14 February 1961, he took part in the Spanish selection for the Eurovision Song Contest 1961, but lost out by one point to Conchita Bautista. On 5–6 February 1962, he entered two songs in the Spanish selection for the Eurovision Song Contest 1962, where "Llámame" was chosen as the Spanish entry. On 18 March, in Luxembourg City, "Llámame" was one of four songs (along with the entries from Belgium, Austria, and the Netherlands) to finish in joint last place after failing to score any points from the juries.

Following his Eurovision appearance, Balaguer returned to performing mainly in his native Catalan. He died of colorectal cancer in Barcelona on 17 April 1984, aged 63.

Preceded by Conchita Bautista with "Estando contigo"	Spain in the Eurovision Song Contest; 1962	Succeeded by José Guardiola with "Algo prodigioso"
