= Un premier amour =

1962 song by Isabelle Aubret

Single by Isabelle Aubret
- Language: French
- Released: 1962
- Genre: Ballad
- Label: Philips
- Composer: Claude-Henri Vic
- Lyricist: Roland Valade

Eurovision Song Contest 1962 entry
- Country: France
- Artist: Isabelle Aubret
- Language: French
- Composer: Claude Henri Vic
- Lyricist: Roland Valade
- Conductor: Franck Pourcel

Finals performance
- Final result: 1st
- Final points: 26

Entry chronology
- ◄ "Printemps, avril carillonne" (1961)
- "Elle était si jolie" (1963) ►

Official performance video
- "Un premier amour" on YouTube

"Un premier amour" (French pronunciation: [œ̃ pʁəmjɛʁ‿amuʁ]; "A First Love") is a song recorded by French singer Isabelle Aubret with music composed by Claude-Henri Vic and French lyrics written by Roland Valade. It represented France in the Eurovision Song Contest 1962 held in Luxembourg, winning the contest.

== Background ==
=== Conception ===
"Un premier amour" was composed by Claude-Henri Vic with French lyrics by Roland Valade, and recorded by Isabelle Aubret. It is a typically dramatic ballad, with Aubret singing about the power that a first love has over people.

=== Eurovision ===
The Radiodiffusion-Télévision Française (RTF) internally selected the song as its entrant for the 7th edition of the Eurovision Song Contest.

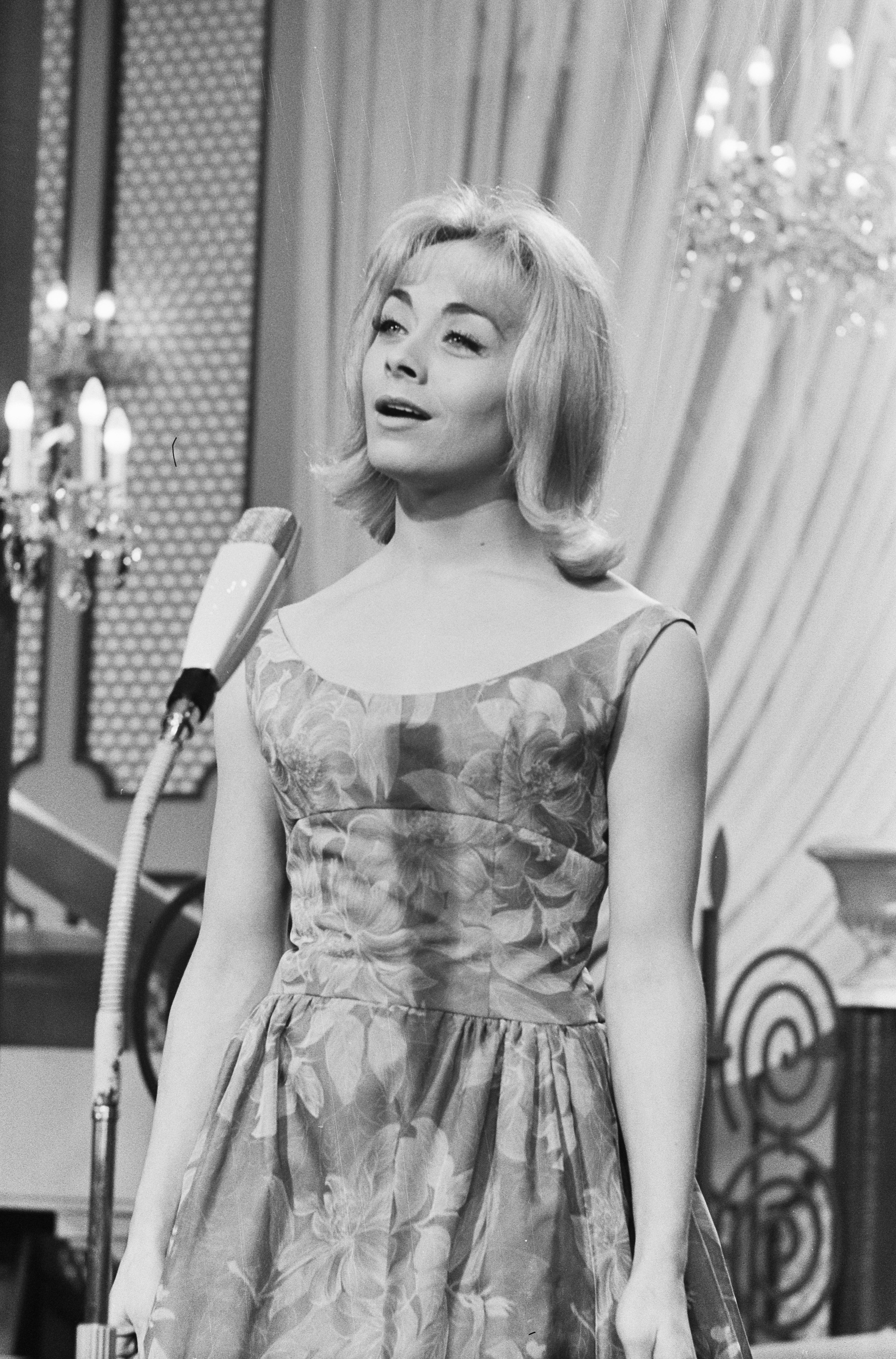
Aubret at Eurovision.

On 18 March 1962, the Eurovision Song Contest was held at Villa Louvigny in Luxembourg hosted by the Compagnie Luxembourgeoise de Télédiffusion (CLT) and broadcast live throughout the continent. Aubret performed "Un premier amour" ninth on the night, following the Netherlands' "Katinka" by De Spelbrekers and preceding Norway's "Kom sol, kom regn" by Inger Jacobsen. Franck Pourcel conducted the event's live orchestra in the performance of the French entry.

By the close of voting, it had received 26 points, placing it first in a field of sixteen, and winning the contest. It was succeeded as contest winner in 1963 by "Dansevise" performed by Grethe & Jørgen Ingmann representing Denmark. It was succeeded as French representative that year by "Elle était si jolie" by Alain Barrière.

=== Aftermath ===
Aubret returned to the contest in 1968, again representing France, singing "La source", placing third with 20 points, behind winner "La, la, la" by Massiel and runner-up "Congratulations" by Cliff Richard. She performed "Un premier amour" in the Eurovision twenty-fifth anniversary show Songs of Europe held on 22 August 1981 in Mysen.

Preceded by "Nous les amoureux" by Jean-Claude Pascal	Eurovision Song Contest winners 1962	Succeeded by "Dansevise" by Grethe & Jørgen Ingmann
