= Eleonore Schwarz =

Austrian singer

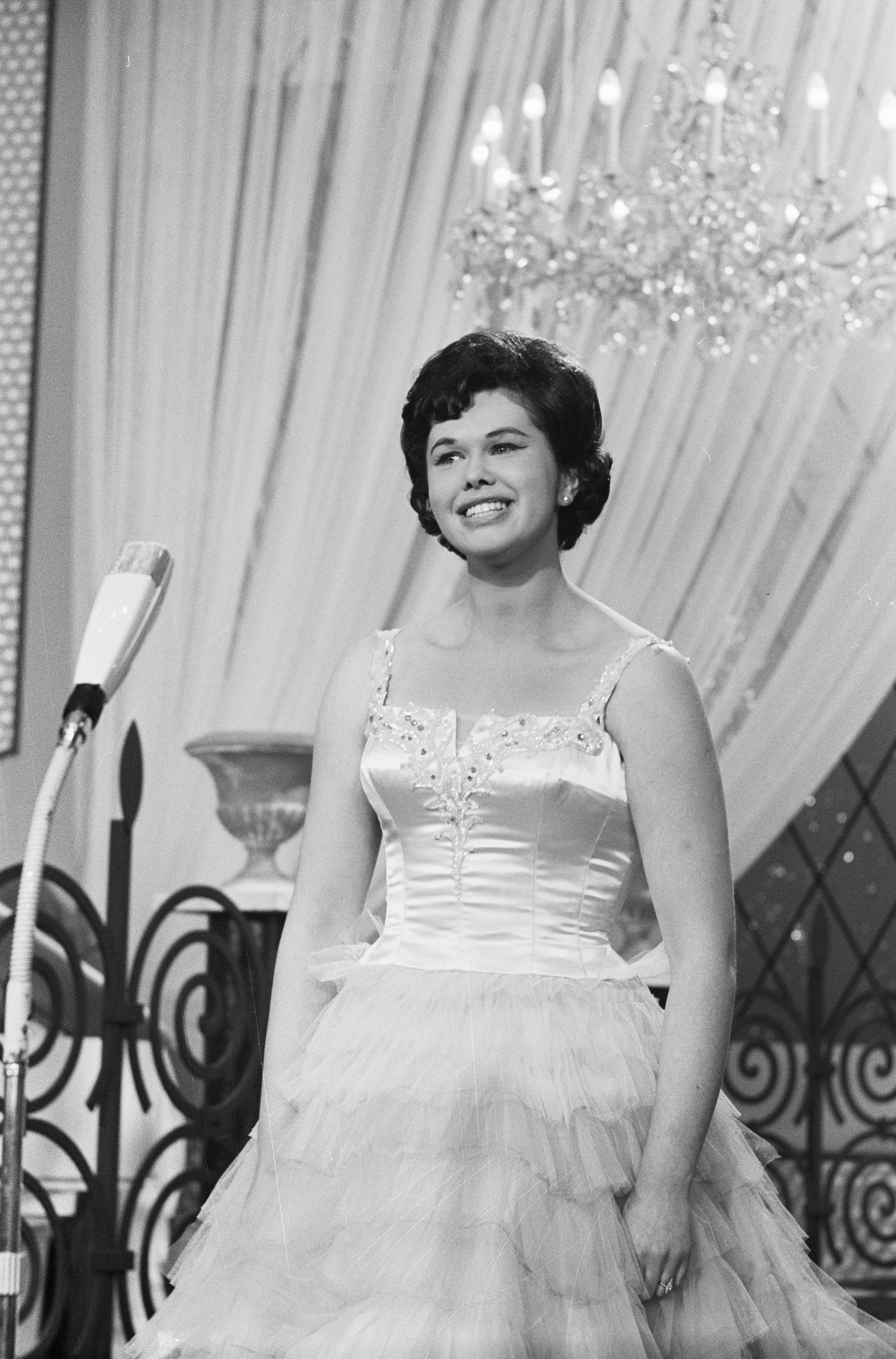
Eleonore Schwarz at the Eurovision Song Contest 1962

Eleonore Schwarz (born 1936 in Vienna) is an Austrian singer.

== Life ==
In the 1960s and 1970s, Schwarz was an opera singer at the Vienna Volksoper.

In 1962, she represented Austria at the Eurovision Song Contest held in Luxembourg with operetta-like song named "Nur in der Wiener Luft" (Only in the Vienna air), the song received no points and ended up with three other participants in last place. The music was composed by Bruno Uher, and was written and directed about the beauty of the Austrian capital, including the Vienna State Opera, City Hall and St. Stephen's Cathedral but also the Viennese Waltz and Johann Strauss II. Schwarz released the song as a single and has had moderate success.

Preceded by Jimmy Makulis	Austria in the Eurovision Song Contest; 1962	Succeeded by Carmela Corren
