= Llámame =

Llámame may refer to:

- "Llámame" (Wrs song), a song by Wrs that was selected to represent Romania in the Eurovision Song Contest 2022
- "Llámame", a song by Víctor Balaguer that was selected to represent Spain in the Eurovision Song Contest 1962
- "Llámame", the Spanish-language version of "Call Me" by Blondie (1980)
- "Llámame", a song by Raymix
