= United Kingdom in the Eurovision Song Contest 1962 =

- Eurovision Song Contest 1962
- Participating broadcaster: British Broadcasting Corporation (BBC)
- Country: United Kingdom
- Selection process: A Song for Europe 1962
- Selection date: 11 February 1962

Competing entry
- Song: "Ring-A-Ding Girl"
- Artist: Ronnie Carroll
- Songwriters: Syd Cordell; Stan Butcher

Placement
- Final result: 4th, 10 points

Participation chronology

The United Kingdom was represented at the Eurovision Song Contest 1962 with the song "Ring-A-Ding Girl", composed by Syd Cordell, with lyrics by Stan Butcher, and performed by Ronnie Carroll. The British participating broadcaster, the British Broadcasting Corporation (BBC), selected its entry through a national final.

== Before Eurovision ==
=== A Song for Europe 1962 ===
The British Broadcasting Corporation (BBC) held A Song for Europe 1962 on 11 February 1962, presented by David Jacobs.

R/O	Artist(s)	Song	Votes	Place
1	Robb Storme	"Pretty Hair and Angel Eyes"	12	5
2	The Brook Brothers	"Tell Tale"	7	8
3	Jackie Lee	"There's No-One in the Whole Wide World"	3	9
4	Johnny Angel	"Look, Look, Little Angel"	11	6
5	Karl Denver	"Never Goodbye"	15	4
6	Doug Sheldon	"My Kingdom for a Girl"	2	10
7	Ronnie Carroll	"Ring-A-Ding Girl"	59	1
8	Brad Newman	"Get a Move On"	1	12
9	Rikki Price	"You're for Real"	2	10
10	Frank Ifield	"Alone Too Long"	26	2
11	Donna Douglas	"The Message in a Bottle"	19	3
12	Kenny Lynch	"There's Never Been a Girl"	11	6

== At Eurovision ==
"Ring-a-Ding Girl" won the national and went on to come equal 4th in the contest, with the orchestra conducted by Wally Stott, who in 1972, transitioned to become Angela Morley.

=== Voting ===
Points awarded to the United Kingdom
Score	Country
3 points	Finland
2 points	Denmark; Switzerland; Yugoslavia
1 point	Spain

Points awarded by the United Kingdom
Score	Country
3 points	Finland
2 points	Germany
1 point	France
