= Finland in the Eurovision Song Contest 1962 =

Eurovision contest 1962, (Tipi-tii)

- Eurovision Song Contest 1962
- Participating broadcaster: Yleisradio (Yle)
- Country: Finland
- Selection process: National final
- Selection date: 15 February 1962

Competing entry
- Song: "Tipi-tii"
- Artist: Marion Rung
- Songwriters: Kari Tuomisaari

Placement
- Final result: 7th, 4 points

Participation chronology

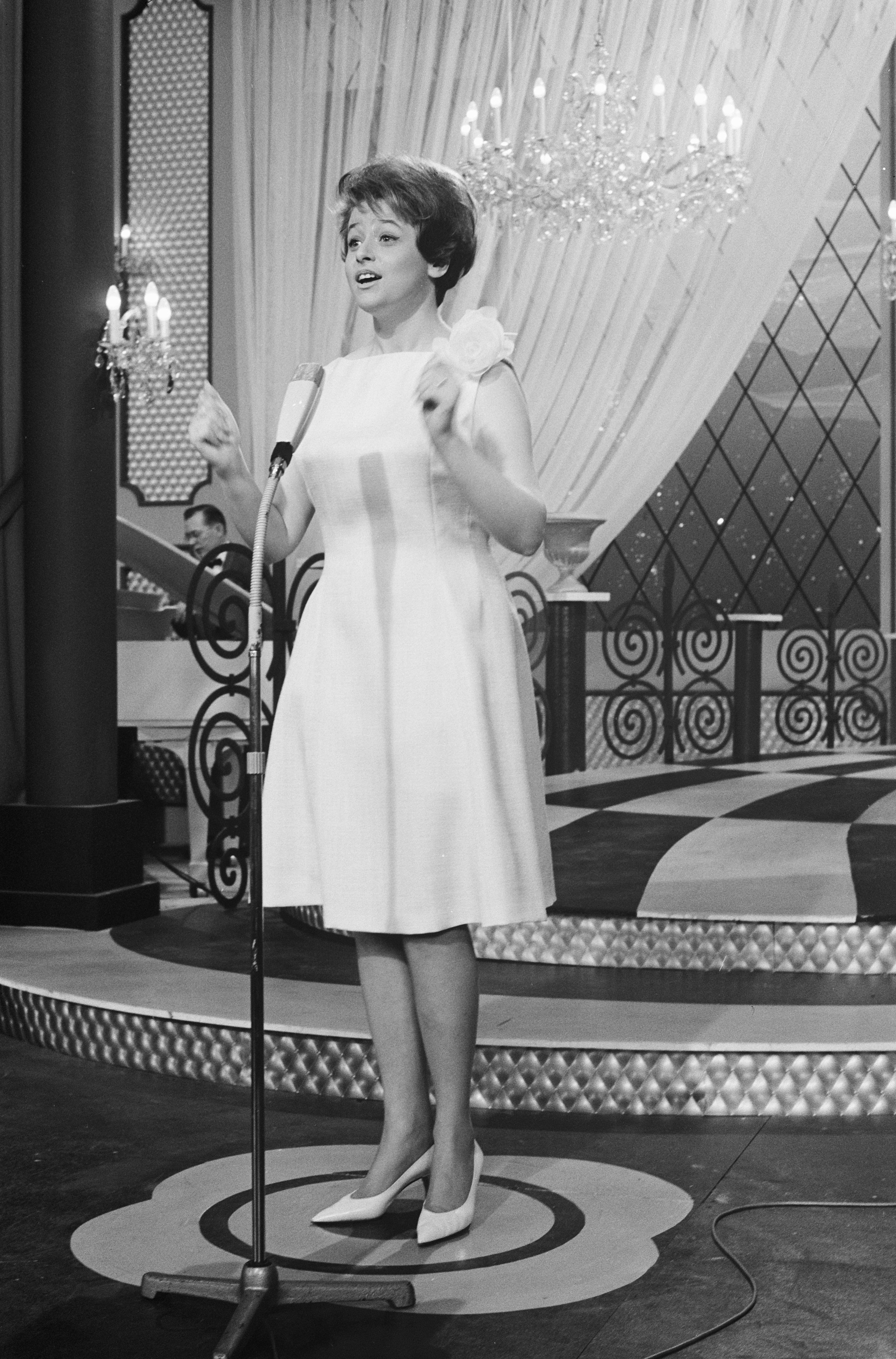
Marion Rung performing "Tipi-tii" on stage

Finland was represented at the Eurovision Song Contest 1962 with the song "Tipi-tii", written by Kari Tuomisaari, and performed by Marion Rung. The Finnish participating broadcaster, Yleisradio (Yle), selected its entry through a national final. Rung would represent Finland again in the 1973 contest.

== Before Eurovision ==
Eight entries were selected for the competition from 170 received submissions. The Finnish national selection consisted of a semi final and a final.

=== Semi-final ===
The semi-final was broadcast on 20 January 1962. The songs were also played on the radio on 24 January 1962. The four finalists were chosen by postcard voting, in which each voter named their top 3 songs. The winner of the postcard voting was "Tipi-tii".

Semi-final – 20 January 1962
R/O	Artist	Song	Songwriter(s)	Result
1	Laila Kinnunen	"Lumineito"	Unknown	—N/a
2	Johnny Forsell	"Anna Angelina"	Unknown	—N/a
3	Marion Rung	"Tipi-tii"	Kari Tuomisaari	Qualified
4	Matti Heinivaho	"Sateinen yö"	Arvo Koskimaa; Lauri Jauhiainen	Qualified
5	Maynie Sirén	"Tiketi tikke tak"	Unknown	—N/a
6	Vieno Kekkonen	"On keskiyö"	Kaarlo Kaartinen; Lasse Liemola	Qualified
7	Kai Lind	"Pikku rahastaja"	Toivo Kärki; Reino Helismaa	Qualified
8	Pirkko Mannola	"Sitä rakkaus on"	Toivo Kärki; Reino Helismaa	—N/a

=== Final ===
Yleisradio (Yle) held the national final on 15 February 1962 at its studios in Helsinki, hosted by Aarno Walli. Each song was performed twice by different singers and different orchestras. The winner was chosen by ten regional juries. Each jury group consisted of ten members.

Final – 15 February 1962
R/O	Artist 1	Artist 2	Song	Points	Place
1	Matti Heinivaho	Vieno Kekkonen	"Sateinen yö"	127	3
2	Kai Lind	Marion Rung	"Pikku rahastaja"	129	2
3	Matti Heinivaho	Vieno Kekkonen	"On keskiyö"	110	4
4	Kai Lind	Marion Rung	"Tipi-tii"	234	1

Detailed Regional Jury Votes
R/O	Song	Kuopio	Seinäjoki	Jyväskylä	Mikkeli	Pori	Tampere	Turku	Kotka	Lahti	Helsinki	Total
1	"Sateinen yö"	6	26	13	6	23	16	13	7	8	9	127
2	"Pikku rahastaja"	18	13	10	15	17	8	6	10	12	20	129
3	"On keskiyö"	14	6	8	12	1	12	21	20	12	4	110
4	"Tipi-tii"	22	15	29	27	19	24	20	23	28	27	234

== At Eurovision ==
The contest was broadcast by Suomen Televisio (with commentary by Aarno Walli) and on radio stations Yleisohjelma (with commentary by Erkki Melakoski) and Ruotsinkielinen yleisohjelma (with commentary by Jan Sederholm).

On the night of the final Rung performed first in the running order, preceding Belgium. Voting was by each national jury awarding 3-2-1 to their top three songs, and at the close "Tipi-tii" had received 4 points (3 from the United Kingdom and 1 from Norway), placing Finland joint 7th (with Sweden) of the 16 entries. The Finnish jury reciprocated the British liking for their song by awarding their 3 points to the United Kingdom.

=== Voting ===
Points awarded to Finland
Score	Country
3 points	United Kingdom
2 points	
1 point	Norway

Points awarded by Finland
Score	Country
3 points	United Kingdom
2 points	Germany
1 point	Yugoslavia
