= Lola Novaković =

Serbian singer

Lola Novaković Лола Новаковић
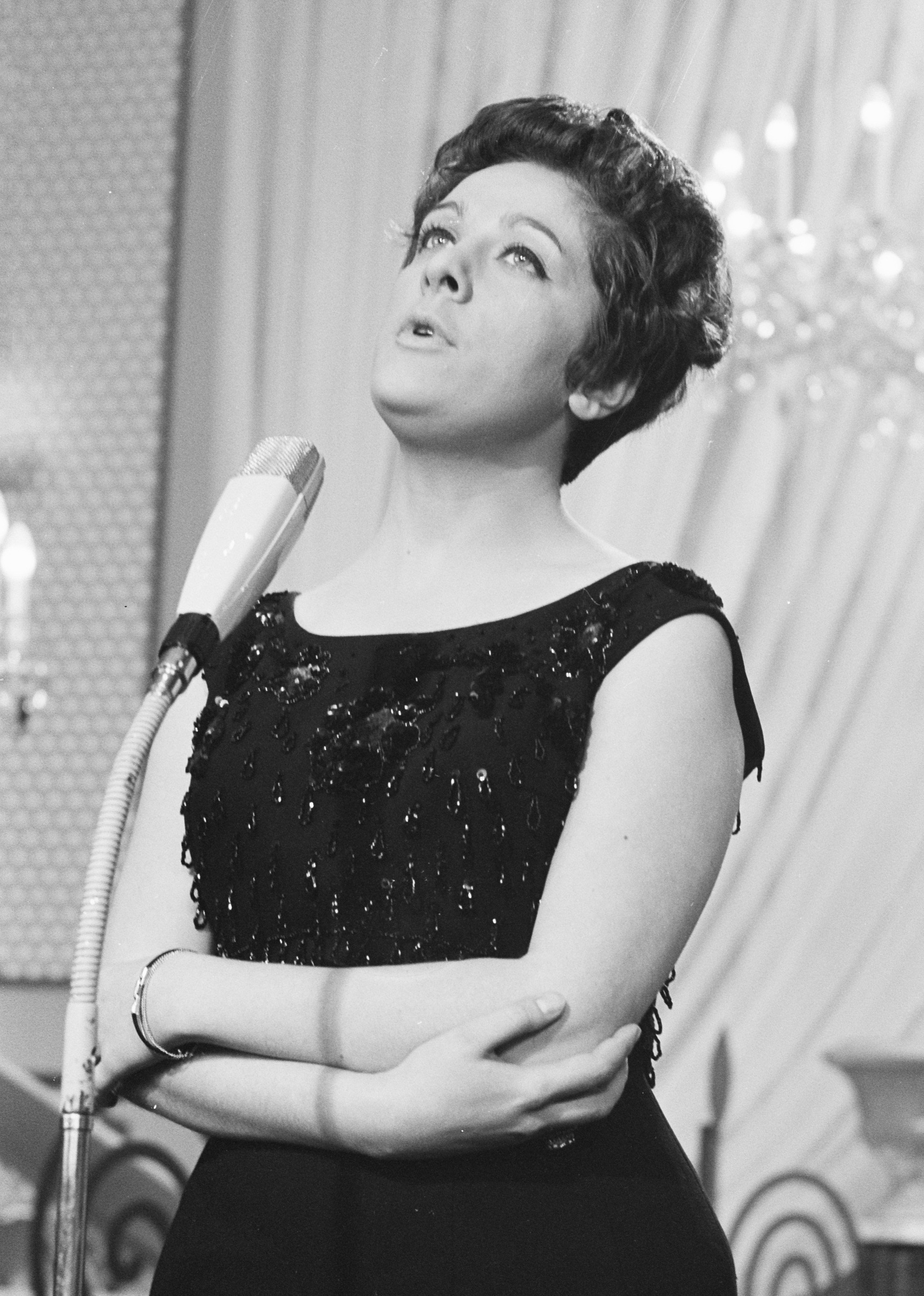
- Novaković at the Eurovision Song Contest 1962.

Background information
- Born: 25 April 1935; Belgrade, Kingdom of Yugoslavia
- Died: 3 April 2016 (aged 80) Serbia
- Occupation: singer

Zorana "Lola" Novaković (Serbian Cyrillic: Зоранa "Лола" Новаковић); (25 April 1935 – 3 April 2016) was a Serbian singer, hugely popular during the 1960s and to a lesser degree the 1970s. She was born in Belgrade, Kingdom of Yugoslavia. She represented Yugoslavia at the Eurovision Song Contest 1962, where she finished fourth.

In 1962, she starred in Šeki snima, pazi se, a full-length comedy inspired by the public persona of football sensation Dragoslav Šekularac.

She died on 3 April 2016, at age 80.

Preceded by Ljiljana Petrović with "Neke davne zvezde"	Yugoslavia in the Eurovision Song Contest; 1962	Succeeded by Vice Vukov with "Brodovi"
