= Spain in the Eurovision Song Contest 1962 =

- Eurovision Song Contest 1962
- Participating broadcaster: Televisión Española (TVE)
- Country: Spain
- Selection process: National final
- Selection date: 6 February 1962

Competing entry
- Song: "Llámame"
- Artist: Víctor Balaguer
- Songwriters: Mario Sellés; Miguel Portolés

Placement
- Final result: 13th, 0 points

Participation chronology

Spain was represented at the Eurovision Song Contest 1962 with the song "Llámame", composed by Mario Sellés, with lyrics by Miguel Portolés, and performed by Víctor Balaguer. The Spanish participating broadcaster, Televisión Española (TVE), selected its entry through a national final. The song, performed in position 3, placed thirteenth –tying for last place with the songs from Austria, Belgium, and the Netherlands– out of sixteen competing entries with 0 points.

== Before Eurovision ==
=== National final ===
Televisión Española (TVE) organised a national final to select its entry for the Eurovision Song Contest 1962. Sixteen songs were presented in a semi-final on 5 February 1962, and ten of these songs went forward to the final that took place on 6 February.

Competing entries
| Song | Songwriter(s) |
|---|---|
| "Canto de un fracaso" | Antonio Areta |
| "Después de aquello" | Fina de Calderón |
| "El sol" | Isidro José Alemany |
| "Esto de nosotros" | José Torregrosa; Rafael de León |
| "Gitanilla" | Jaime Segalés; Jorge Miranda |
| "Grandioso" | Carlos Laporta Segarra |
| "Huella de ti" | Ester Gloria Prieto |
| "Júpiter" | Eduardo G. Beitía; Domingo Murillo |
| "Llámame" | Mario Sellés; Miguel Portolés |
| "Nostalgia" | Jorge Domingo Mombiela |
| "Perdona, Otelo" | Manuel Alejandro; Ignacio Román |
| "Phss, phss a ti" | Mireya Xapelli |
| "Que llueva" | José María Oriol Murt |
| "Recuerdo" | José Solá Sánchez |
| "Sí; existe el amor" | José Capell Hernández |
| "Un viejo paraguas" | Gregorio García Segura; Alfredo García Segura |

==== Final ====
The final, that was held within TVE's regular musical show Amigos del martes, was hosted by Federico Gallo at the Miramar studios in Barcelona, with Jesús Álvarez at the Paseo de la Habana studios in Madrid, and was aired on TVE and on Radio Nacional.

The winning song was selected by the votes of twelve juries: ten regional juries at Radio Nacional de España (RNE) stations all around Spain, (Note: The ten regional juries were located at the RNE stations in Madrid, Barcelona, La Coruña, Seville, Valencia, San Sebastián, Huelva, Málaga, Cuenca, and at Radio Peninsular.) and two juries at the TVE studios in Barcelona and Madrid. The jury located at the Miramar studios in Barcelona was composed of: Ignacio de Agustín, Elisenda Nadal, Carmen Porcioles, Alfonso Banda, Silvia Martín Alonso, Ladislao Kubala, Aurora Pons, Carmen Lombart, and Antonio Juliá de Capmany. The jury located at the Paseo de la Habana studios in Madrid was composed of: the Duchess of Alba, the Countess of Quintanilla, Natalia Figueroa, Mariemma, Ana Mariscal, Emilio Romero, Guillermo Núñez, Alfredo Di Stéfano, Antonio Ordóñez, and Alfonso Paso.

The song "Llámame", composed by Mario Sellés, with lyrics by Miguel Portolés, and performed by Víctor Balaguer, was proclaimed the winner.

Final – 6 February 1962
| R/O | Artist | Song | Place |
|---|---|---|---|
| 1 | Dúo Juvens | "Que llueva" | —N/a |
| 2 | Víctor Balaguer | "Grandioso" | 3 |
| 3 | Tonio Areta | "Un viejo paraguas" | 2 |
| 4 | Lita Torelló | "Después de aquello" | —N/a |
| 5 | José Guardiola | "Recuerdo" | —N/a |
| 6 | José Guardiola | "Nostalgia" | —N/a |
| 7 | Tonio Areta | "Canto de un fracaso" | —N/a |
| 8 | Raphael | "Perdona, Otelo" | —N/a |
| 9 | Víctor Balaguer | "Llámame" | 1 |
| 10 | Gelu | "Huella de ti" | —N/a |

== At Eurovision ==
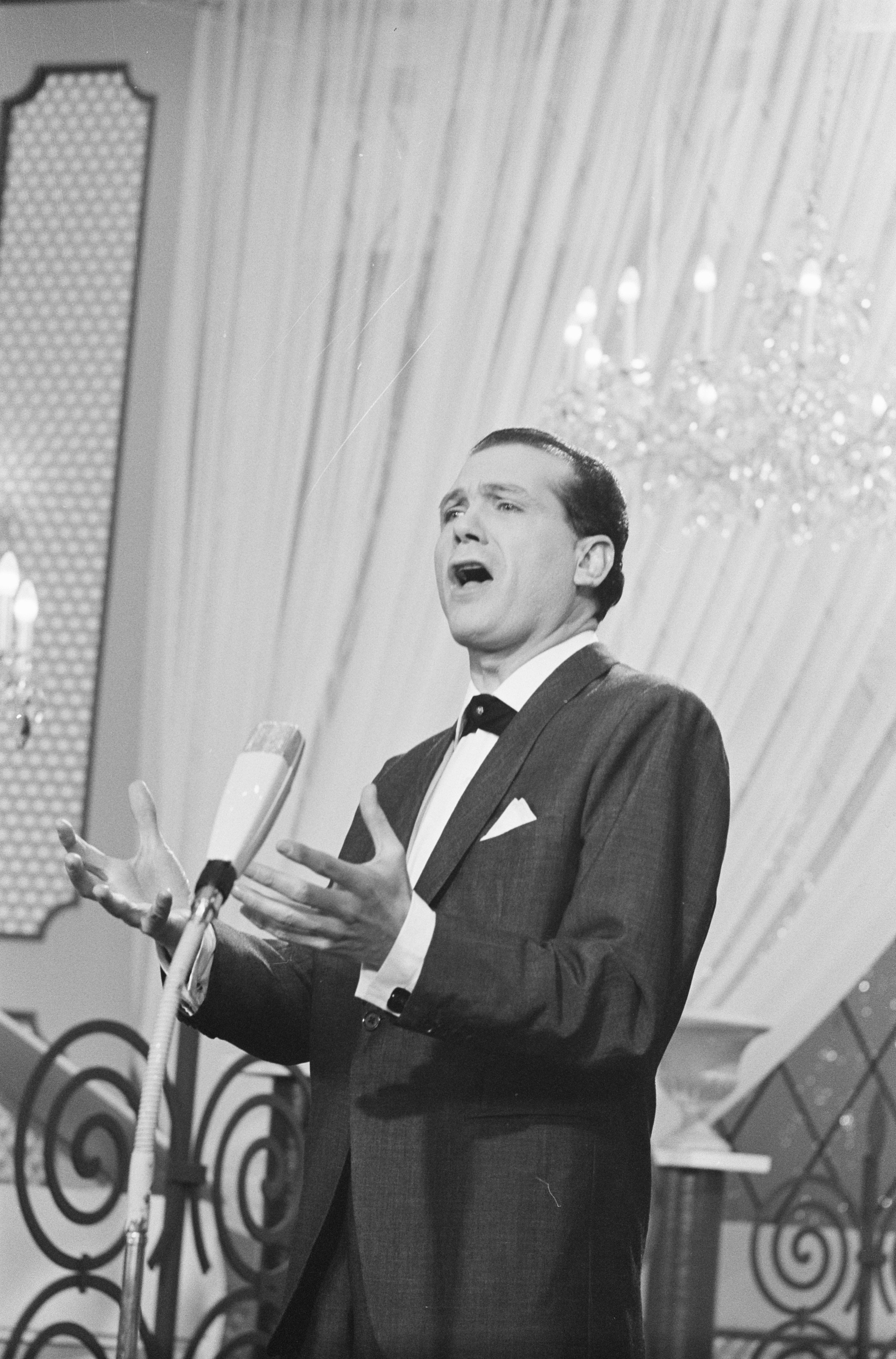
Víctor Balaguer performing at Eurovision.

The Eurovision Song Contest 1962 was held on 18 March 1962 at the Villa Louvigny in Luxembourg. Víctor Balaguer performed "Llámame" third in the running order, following Belgium and preceding Austria. Jean Roderès –the event's musical director– conducted the event's orchestra performance of the Spanish entry. The song received nul points, sharing the last place with Austria, Belgium, and the Netherlands.

TVE broadcast the contest in Spain on its television service with commentary by Federico Gallo. RNE aired the contest on Radio Nacional.

=== Voting ===
TVE assembled a jury panel with ten members, at its Miramar studios in Barcelona. The following members comprised the Spanish jury:

- Luis Marsillach – journalist
- Ignacio F. Iquino – film director
- Agustín Oñate – ship capitan
- Juan Gorostidi – director of the Orfeón Donostiarra
- Ana María Matute – writer
- Antonio Ozores – actor
- Antonio Ramallets – football player
- Margot Cottens – actress
- Elisa Montés – actress
- Marcos Redondo – baritone

Spain did not receive any points at the contest.

Points awarded by Spain
| Score | Country |
|---|---|
| 3 points | Luxembourg |
| 2 points | France |
| 1 point | United Kingdom |
