= Eurovision Song Contest 1962 =

International song competition

Coordinates: 49°36′41″N 06°07′21″E

Date and venue
- Final: 18 March 1962
- Venue: Villa Louvigny; Luxembourg City, Luxembourg

Organisation
- Organiser: European Broadcasting Union (EBU)

Production
- Host broadcaster: Compagnie Luxembourgeoise de Télédiffusion (CLT)
- Directors: Jos Pauly; René Steichen
- Musical director: Jean Roderès
- Presenter: Mireille Delannoy

Participants
- Number of entries: 16
- Participation map: Participating countries

Vote
- Voting system: Each country awarded 3, 2 and 1 points to their three favourite songs
- Winning song: France "Un premier amour"

The Eurovision Song Contest 1962, originally known as the Grand Prix Eurovision de la Chanson Européenne 1962 (English: Eurovision Song Contest Grand Prix 1962), was the 7th edition of the Eurovision Song Contest, held on 18 March 1962 at the Grand Auditorium of Villa Louvigny in Luxembourg City, Luxembourg, and presented by Mireille Delannoy. It was organised by the European Broadcasting Union (EBU) and host broadcaster Compagnie Luxembourgeoise de Télédiffusion (CLT), who staged the event after winning the 1961 contest for Luxembourg with the song "Nous les amoureux" by Jean-Claude Pascal.

Broadcasters from sixteen countries participated in the contest, with the same line-up of countries as at the previous year.

The winner was France with the song "Un premier amour", composed by Claude-Henri Vic, written by Roland Valade and performed by Isabelle Aubret. It was France's third win in five years. Monaco, Luxembourg, the United Kingdom and Yugoslavia rounded out the top five, with the top three all being performed in French. This was the best result for Monaco up to this point. For the first time in the contest's history more than one entry received nul points from all juries, with Austria, Belgium, the Netherlands, and Spain all failed to receive any points.

== Location ==
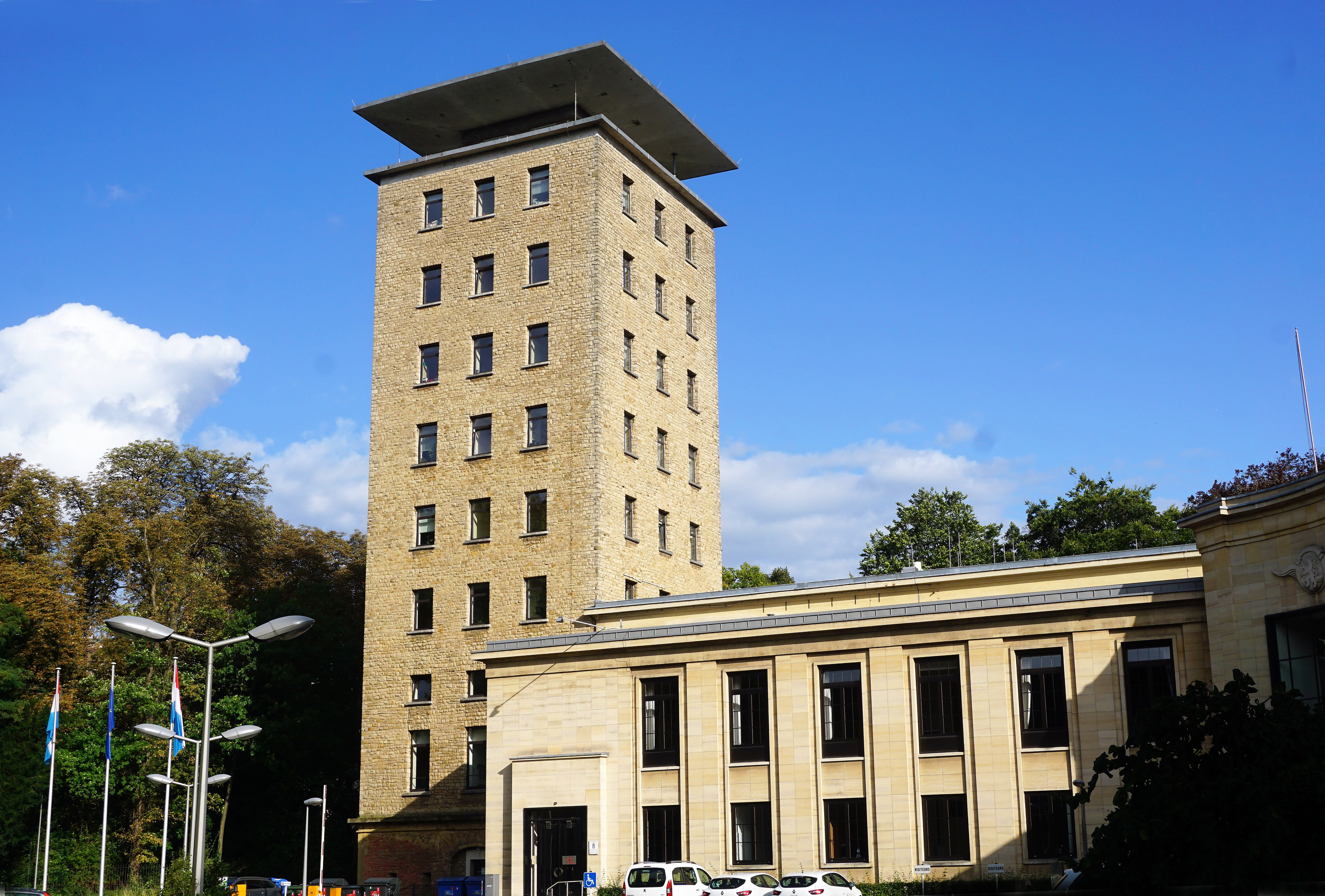
Villa Louvigny, Luxembourg City – host venue of the 1962 contest

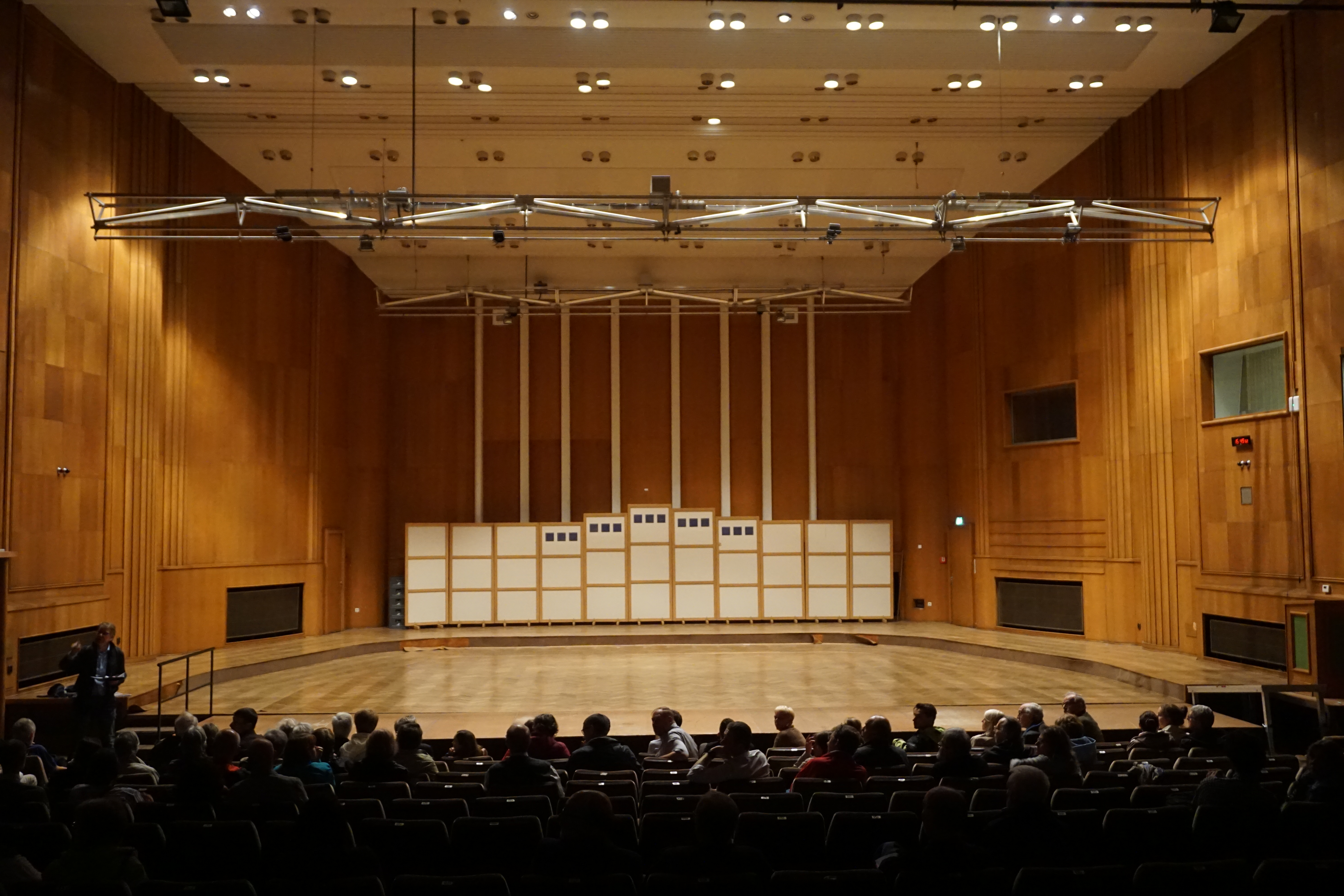
The grand auditorium of the Villa Louvigny

The 1962 contest took place in Luxembourg City, Luxembourg, following the country's victory at the 1961 contest with the song "Nous les amoureux" performed by Jean-Claude Pascal. It was the first time that Luxembourg had hosted the event. The chosen venue was the Villa Louvigny, situated within the city's Municipal Park in the Ville Haute district of the city centre, which served as the headquarters of the Compagnie Luxembourgeoise de Télédiffusion (CLT), the Luxembourgish public broadcaster. The contest itself was held in the building's Grand Auditorium.

== Participants ==
Eurovision Song Contest 1962 – Participation summaries by country
- Austria; Belgium; Denmark; Finland; France; Germany; Italy; Luxembourg; Monaco; Netherlands; Norway; Spain; Sweden; Switzerland; United Kingdom; Yugoslavia

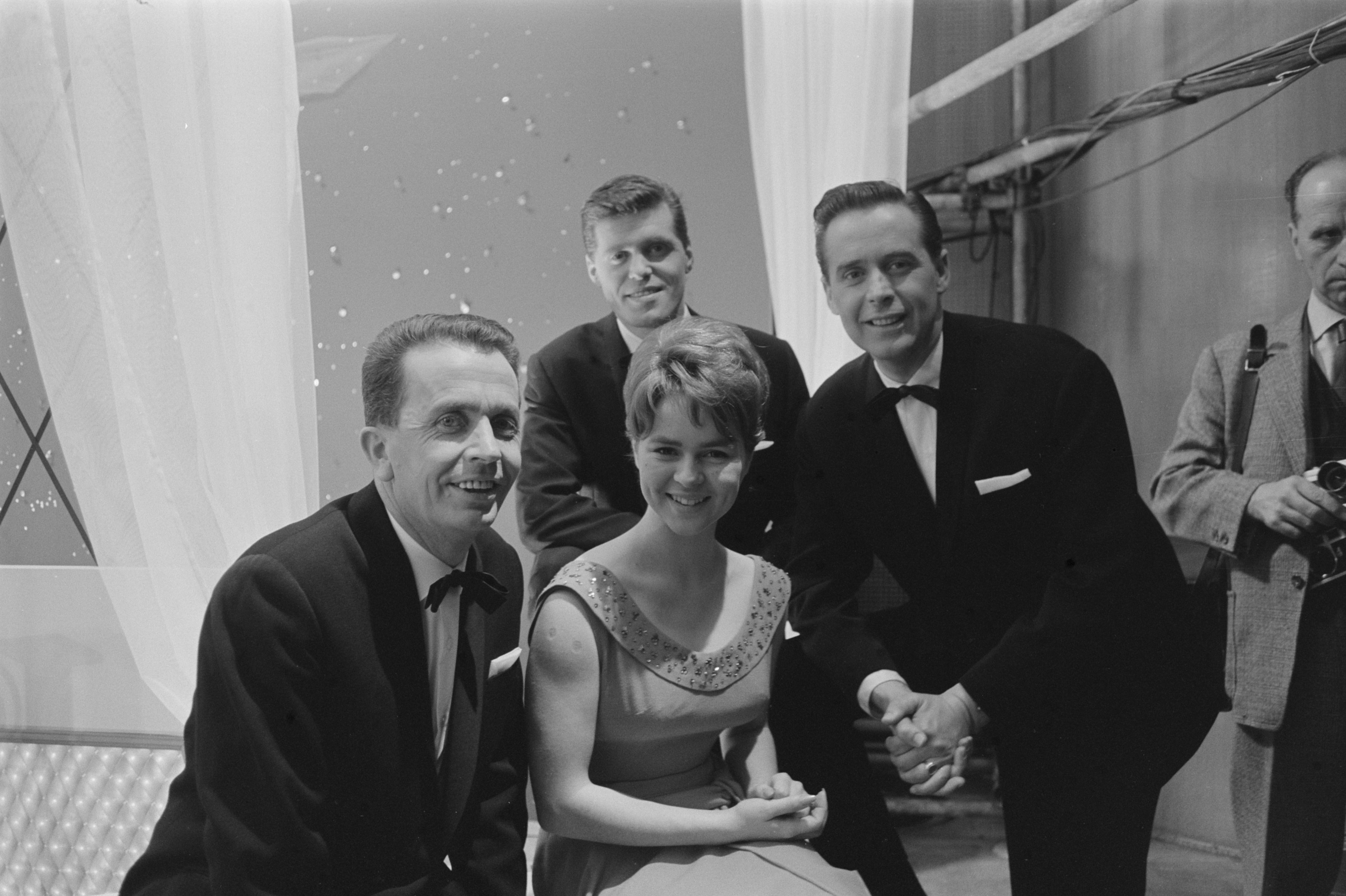
Germany's Conny Froboess (center; front), the United Kingdom's Ronnie Carroll (center; back), and the Netherlands' Spelbrekers (Huug Kok left and Theo Rekkers right) backstage at the contest

There was no change in the participants line-up for the first time, with no new countries joining the event and the same sixteen countries which had competed in 1961 returning for 1962.

Four artists in this year's event had previously participated in past contests: Luxembourg's Camillo Felgen and Monaco's François Deguelt competed for their respective countries for the second time after both appearing in the 1960 contest; Jean Philippe, representing Switzerland at this event, also participated for the second time, after previously competing for France in 1959; and Fud Leclerc made his fourth contest appearance for Belgium, following past entries in 1956, 1958 and 1960. Philippe became the first artist to represent two different countries in separate Eurovision Song Contests, while Leclerc became the first of only four acts to compete in four separate contests, alongside Switzerland's Peter, Sue and Marc (1971, 1976, 1979 and 1981); Norway's Elisabeth Andreassen (1982, 1985, 1994 and 1996); and San Marino's Valentina Monetta (2012, 2013, 2014 and 2017). (Note: Switzerland's Lys Assia also competed in the Eurovision Song Contest with four different songs; however, she only competed in three separate contests (1956, 1957 and 1958), participating in the 1956 contest with two songs.) Four other artists competing in this event would go on to compete in the contest on another occasion: the United Kingdom's Ronnie Carroll (1963); Italy's Claudio Villa (1967); France's Isabelle Aubret (1968); and Finland's Marion Rung (1973). As a result, half of the competing artists in this year's event had competed, or would eventually compete, in multiple Eurovision Song Contests.

Eurovision Song Contest 1962 participants
Country	Broadcaster	Artist	Song	Language	Songwriter(s)	Conductor
Austria	ORF	Eleonore Schwarz	"Nur in der Wiener Luft"	German	Bruno Uher	Bruno Uher
Belgium	RTB	Fud Leclerc	"Ton nom"	French	Eric Channe; Tony Golan	Henri Segers
Denmark	DR	Ellen Winther	"Vuggevise"	Danish	Kjeld Bonfils; Sejr Volmer-Sørensen	Kai Mortensen
Finland	YLE	Marion Rung	"Tipi-tii"	Finnish	Jaakko Salo; Kari Tuomisaari	George de Godzinsky
France	RTF	Isabelle Aubret	"Un premier amour"	French	Roland Valade; Claude-Henri Vic	Franck Pourcel
Germany	SWF (Note: On behalf of the German public broadcasting consortium ARD)	Conny Froboess	"Zwei kleine Italiener"	German	Christian Bruhn; Georg Buschor	Rolf-Hans Müller
Italy	RAI	Claudio Villa	"Addio, addio"	Italian	Franco Migliacci; Domenico Modugno	Cinico Angelini
Luxembourg	CLT	Camillo Felgen	"Petit bonhomme"	French	Jacques Datin; Maurice Vidalin	Jean Roderès
Monaco	TMC	François Deguelt	"Dis rien"	French	René Rouzaud; Henri Salvador	Raymond Lefèvre
Netherlands	NTS	De Spelbrekers	"Katinka"	Dutch	Henny Hamhuis; Lodewijk Post; Joop Stokkermans	Dolf van der Linden
Norway	NRK	Inger Jacobsen	"Kom sol, kom regn"	Norwegian	Ivar Andersen; Kjell Karlsen	Øivind Bergh
Spain	TVE	Víctor Balaguer	"Llámame"	Spanish	Miguel Portolés; Mario Sellés	Jean Roderès
Sweden	SR	Inger Berggren	"Sol och vår"	Swedish	Åke Gerhard; Ulf Källqvist	Egon Kjerrman
Switzerland	SRG SSR	Jean Philippe	"Le Retour"	French	Émile Gardaz; Géo Voumard	Cédric Dumont
United Kingdom	BBC	Ronnie Carroll	"Ring-A-Ding Girl"	English	Stan Butcher; Syd Cordell	Angela Morley (Note: Credited as Wally Stott; Morley transitioned in 1972.)
Yugoslavia	JRT	Lola Novaković	"Ne pali svetla u sumrak" (Не пали светла у сумрак)	Serbo-Croatian	Dragutin Britvić; Jože Privšek	Jože Privšek

== Production and format ==
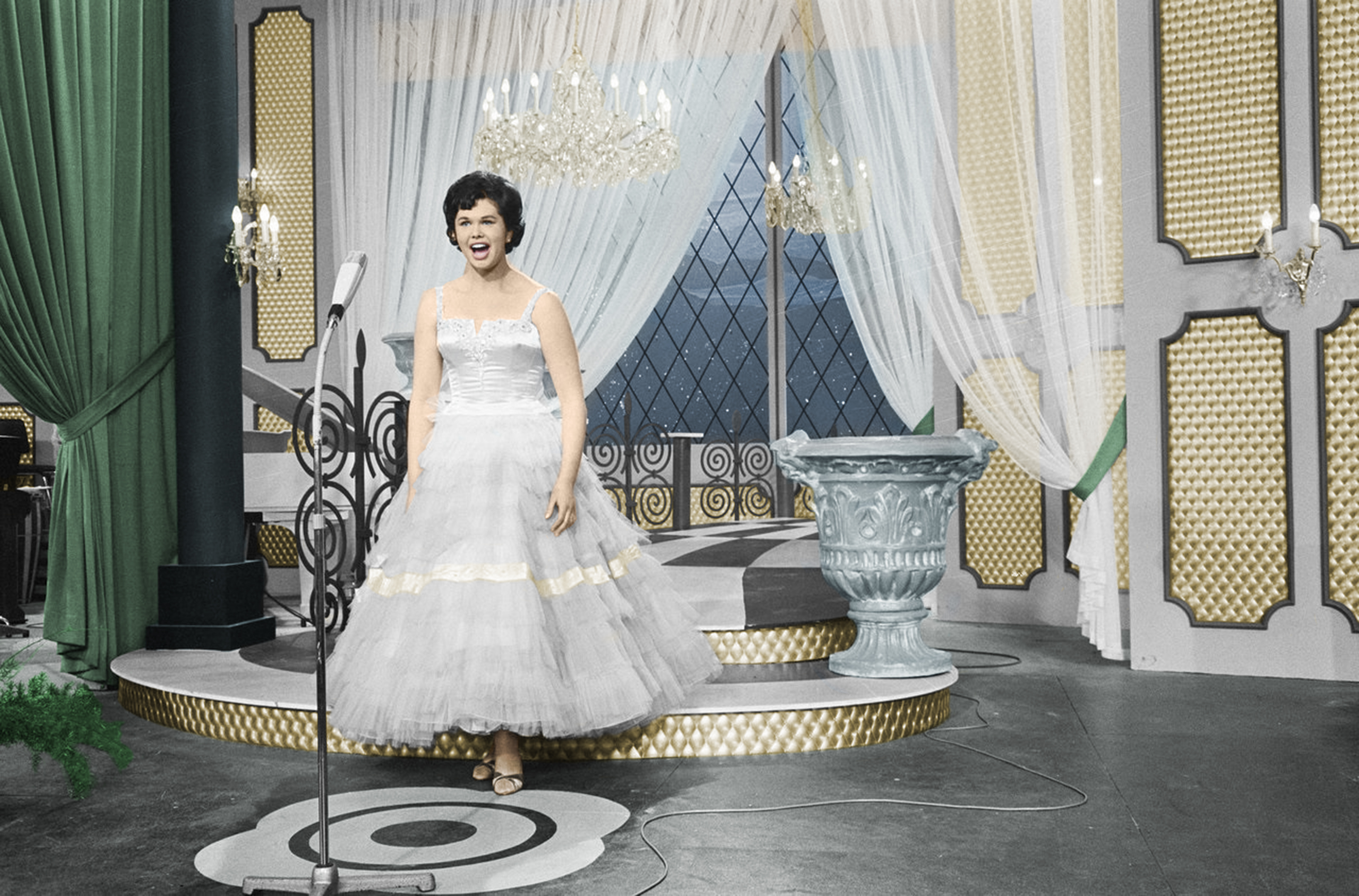
A colourised photograph of Jean-Paul Conzemius's stage design; Austria's Eleonore Schwarz is shown performing

The contest was organised and broadcast by CLT. Jos Pauly and René Steichen served as producers and directors, Jean-Paul Conzemius served as designer, and Jean Roderès served as musical director, leading around forty musicians of the Grand orchestre symphonique de Radio Luxembourg. Each participating delegation was allowed to nominate its own musical director to lead the orchestra during the performance of its country's entry, with the host musical director also conducting for those countries which did not nominate their own conductor. The contest was presented by Mireille Delannoy, one of Télé-Luxembourg's regular continuity announcers.

Each country, participating through a single EBU member broadcaster, was represented by one song performed by up to two people on stage. The results of the event were determined through jury voting; in a change from previous events, each country awarded three points to the jury's collective favourite entry, with two points awarded to the jury's second favourite, and one point given the jury's third favourite. Each jury comprised ten individuals representing the average television viewer and radio listener; as such no individuals in the music industry, including composers, music publishers, and people employed by record companies, were able to sit on the jury.

The draw to determine the running order took place on 16 March 1962 in the Villa Louvigny, conducted by Delannoy and assisted by her 4-year-old son Olivier. Rehearsals were held in the contest venue on 17 and 18 March, with two full dress rehearsals scheduled before the live broadcast on the evening of 18 March.

== Contest overview ==
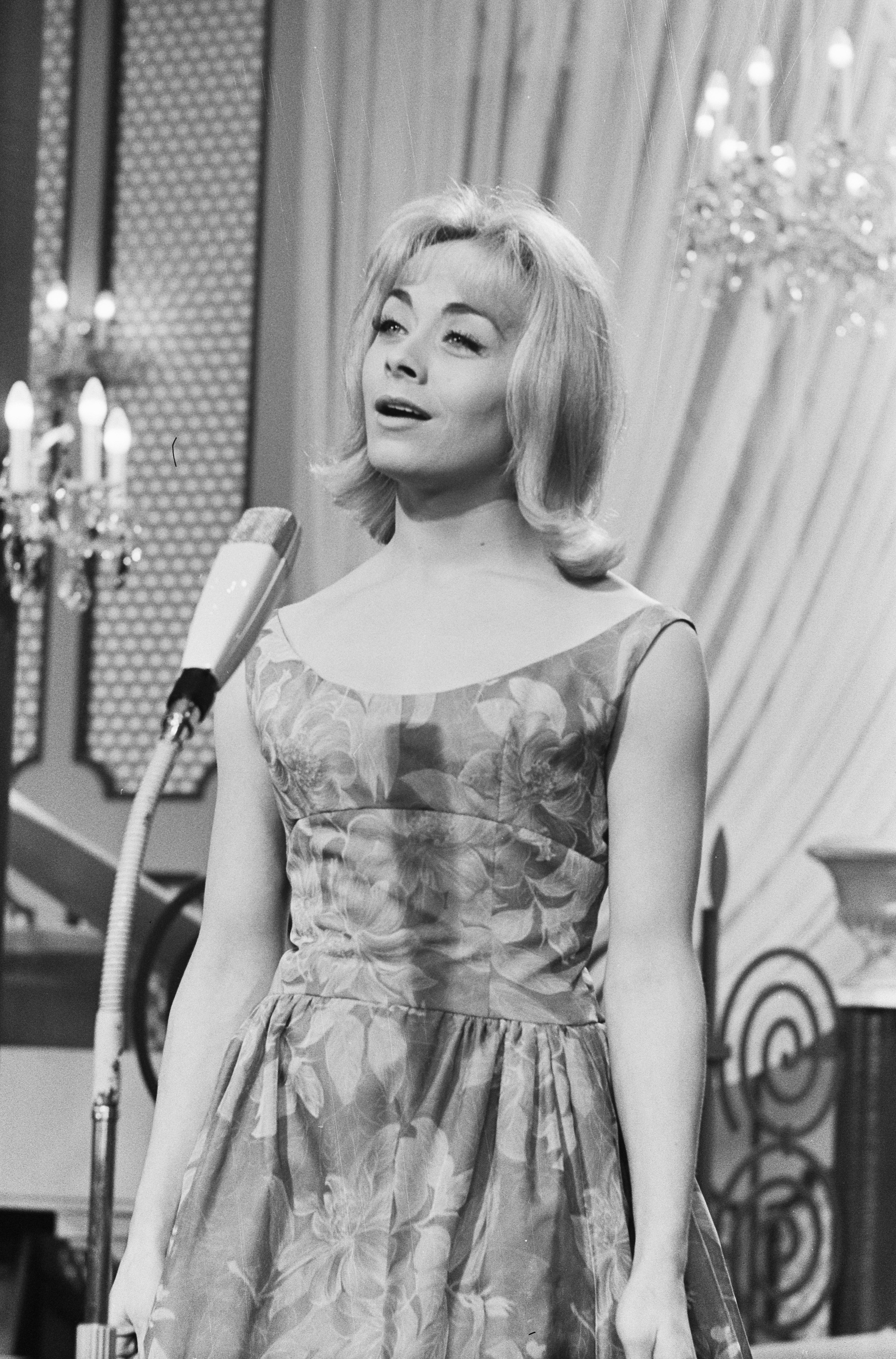
France's Isabelle Aubret, the eventual winner, performing on stage

The contest was held at 18 March 1962 at 21:30 (CET) and lasted 1 hour and 27 minutes. Held on a Sunday, this is the last time that the contest's grand final was not held on a Saturday. The interval act was a performance by the French clown Achille Zavatta, in a skit as the contest's seventeenth participant representing "Zavattaland". The prize for the winning artist and songwriters—a medallion engraved with the figure of a winged lion, the heraldic animal of CLT, and designed by Hans Mettel—was presented by the previous year's winning artist Jean-Claude Pascal.

The contest suffered from two power failures which impacted the broadcast of the event: the first occurred during the Dutch entry, which affected the picture quality and plunged the performance into total darkness for around 30 seconds for some broadcasters; the second occurred immediately following the French entry as the auditorium went completely dark for around 1 minutes and 30 seconds, leading to broadcasters showing "breakdown" captions on-screen as the issue was resolved and a delay in the performance of the Norwegian entry.

The winner was France represented by the song "Un premier amour", composed by Claude-Henri Vic, written by Roland Valade and performed by Isabelle Aubret. This was France's third contest victory in five years, also setting a new record as the first country to win the contest three times. Monaco secured its first second-place finish, while the host nation's entry finished in third place; the top three positions were therefore all performed in the French language. Monaco's François Deguelt, who had previously come third in 1960, became the first of only five artists who have placed second and third in the contest without having won, alongside the UK's Cliff Richard, Germany's Katja Ebstein, Malta's Chiara Siracusa and Serbia's Željko Joksimović. For the first time in the contest's history an entry scored nul points from all juries; four countries ultimately scored zero points, namely Belgium, Spain, Austria and the Netherlands.

Results of the Eurovision Song Contest 1962
R/O	Country	Artist	Song	Points	Place
1	Finland	Marion Rung	"Tipi-tii"	4	7
2	Belgium	Fud Leclerc	"Ton nom"	0	13
3	Spain	Victor Balaguer	"Llámame"	0	13
4	Austria	Eleonore Schwarz	"Nur in der Wiener Luft"	0	13
5	Denmark	Ellen Winther	"Vuggevise"	2	10
6	Sweden	Inger Berggren	"Sol och vår"	4	7
7	Germany	Conny Froboess	"Zwei kleine Italiener"	9	6
8	Netherlands	De Spelbrekers	"Katinka"	0	13
9	France	Isabelle Aubret	"Un premier amour"	26	1
10	Norway	Inger Jacobsen	"Kom sol, kom regn"	2	10
11	Switzerland	Jean Philippe	"Le Retour"	2	10
12	Yugoslavia	Lola Novaković	"Ne pali svetla u sumrak"	10	4
13	United Kingdom	Ronnie Carroll	"Ring-A-Ding Girl"	10	4
14	Luxembourg	Camillo Felgen	"Petit bonhomme"	11	3
15	Italy	Claudio Villa	"Addio, addio"	3	9
16	Monaco	François Deguelt	"Dis rien"	13	2

=== Spokespersons ===
Each participating broadcaster appointed a spokesperson, connected to the contest venue via telephone lines and responsible for announcing, in English or French, the votes for its respective country. Known spokespersons at the 1962 contest are listed below.

- Finland – Poppe Berg
- Sweden – Tage Danielsson
- United Kingdom – Alex Macintosh

== Detailed voting results ==
Jury voting was used to determine the points awarded by all countries. The announcement of the results from each country was conducted in reverse order to that in which each country performed, with the spokespersons announcing their country's points in English or French in descending order. The detailed breakdown of the points awarded by each country is listed in the tables below, with voting countries listed in the order in which they presented their votes.

The new voting system produced what some consider to be one of the least exciting voting sequences in the contest's history, with France quickly taking the lead and ultimately finishing with double the number of points compared to the runner-up Monegasque entry. With each country only able to award points to three of the potential fifteen countries available, leaving twelve countries without points, the new system also most likely contributed to countries being awarded zero points overall for the first time.

Detailed voting results of the Eurovision Song Contest 1962
		Total score	Monaco	Italy	Luxembourg	United Kingdom	Yugoslavia	Switzerland	Norway	France	Netherlands	Germany	Sweden	Denmark	Austria	Spain	Belgium	Finland
Contestants	Finland	4				**3**			1									
Contestants	Belgium	0																
Contestants	Spain	0																
Contestants	Austria	0																
Contestants	Denmark	2		1									1					
Contestants	Sweden	4									1			**3**				
Contestants	Germany	9	2			2					2			1				2
Contestants	Netherlands	0																
Contestants	France	**26**	1	2	1	1	**3**	**3**	**3**			**3**	**3**		2	2	2	
Contestants	Norway	2								2								
Contestants	Switzerland	2										2						
Contestants	Yugoslavia	10		**3**						**3**			2				1	1
Contestants	United Kingdom	10					2	2						2		1		**3**
Contestants	Luxembourg	11	**3**					1							1	**3**	**3**	
Contestants	Italy	3			2		1											
Contestants	Monaco	13			**3**				2	1	**3**	1			**3**			

=== 3 points ===
The below table summarises how the maximum 3 points were awarded from one country to another. The winning country is shown in bold. France received the maximum score of 3 points from five of the voting countries, Luxembourg and Monaco each received three sets of 3 points, Yugoslavia received two sets of maximum scores, and Finland, Sweden and the United Kingdom received one maximum score each.

Distribution of 3 points awarded at the Eurovision Song Contest 1962
N.	Contestant	Nation(s) giving 3 points
5	**France**	Germany, Norway, Sweden, Switzerland, Yugoslavia
3	Luxembourg	Belgium, Spain, Monaco
3	Monaco	Austria, Luxembourg, Netherlands
2	Yugoslavia	France, Italy
1	Finland	United Kingdom
1	Sweden	Denmark
1	United Kingdom	Finland

== Broadcasts ==
Broadcasters competing in the event were required to relay the contest via its networks; non-participating EBU member broadcasters were also able to relay the contest. Broadcasters were able to send commentators to provide coverage of the contest in their own native language and to relay information about the artists and songs to their television viewers. These commentators were typically sent to the venue to report on the event, and were able to provide commentary from small booths constructed at the back of the venue. At least 15 commentators were present at the contest, with an estimated global viewership and listenership of 60 to 100 million reported in the media. Known details on the broadcasts in each country, including the specific broadcasting stations and commentators are shown in the table below.

Broadcasters and commentators
Country	Broadcaster	Channel(s)	Commentator(s)	Ref(s)
Austria	ORF	ORF		
Belgium	RTB	RTB		
Belgium	BRT	BRT	Willem Duys	
Denmark	DR	Danmarks Radio TV, Program 2	Ole Mortensen	
Finland	YLE	Suomen Televisio	Aarno Walli	
Finland	YLE	Yleisohjelma	Erkki Melakoski	
Finland	YLE	Ruotsinkielinen yleisohjelma	Jan Sederholm	
France	RTF	RTF	Pierre Tchernia	
France	RTF	France I		
Germany	ARD	Deutsches Fernsehen	Ruth Kappelsberger	
Italy	RAI	Programma Nazionale TV (Note: Deferred broadcast at 22:15 (CET))	Renato Tagliani	
Luxembourg	CLT	Télé-Luxembourg, Radio Luxembourg		
Monaco	Radio Monte Carlo (Note: Delayed broadcast in a shortened format on 23 March at 17:02 (CET))			
Netherlands	NTS	NTS	Willem Duys	
Netherlands	AVRO	Hilversum 2 (Note: Deferred broadcast in a shortened format at 23:00 (CET))		
Norway	NRK	NRK Fjernsynet, NRK	Odd Grythe	
Spain	TVE	TVE	Federico Gallo	
Spain	RNE	RNE		
Sweden	SR	Sveriges TV, SR P1	Jan Gabrielsson	
Switzerland	SRG SSR	TV DRS		
Switzerland	SRG SSR	TSR	Pierre Tchernia	
Switzerland	SRG SSR	TSI	Giovanni Bertini	
Switzerland	SRG SSR	Radio Genève (Note: Deferred broadcast at 22:30 (CET))		
Switzerland	SRG SSR	Radio Monte Ceneri		
United Kingdom	BBC	BBC TV	David Jacobs	
Yugoslavia	JRT	Televizija Beograd		
Yugoslavia	JRT	Televizija Ljubljana		
Yugoslavia	JRT	Televizija Zagreb		

== Notes and references ==
=== Bibliography ===
- Murtomäki, Asko (2007). Finland 12 points! Suomen Euroviisut (in Finnish). Helsinki, Finland: Teos. ISBN 951-851-106-3.
- O'Connor, John Kennedy (2010). The Eurovision Song Contest: The Official History (2nd ed.). London: Carlton Books. ISBN 978-1-84732-521-1.
- Roxburgh, Gordon (2012). Songs for Europe: The United Kingdom at the Eurovision Song Contest. Vol. One: The 1950s and 1960s. Prestatyn, United Kingdom: Telos Publishing. ISBN 978-1-84583-065-6.
- Thorsson, Leif; Verhage, Martin (2006). Melodifestivalen genom tiderna : de svenska uttagningarna och internationella finalerna [Melodifestivalen through the ages: the Swedish selections and international finals] (in Swedish). Stockholm, Sweden: Premium Publishing. ISBN 91-89136-29-2.
