= Yugoslavia in the Eurovision Song Contest 1962 =

- Eurovision Song Contest 1962
- Participating broadcaster: Jugoslavenska radiotelevizija (JRT)
- Country: Yugoslavia
- Selection process: Jugovizija 1962
- Selection date: 23 January 1962

Competing entry
- Song: "Ne pali svetla u sumrak"
- Artist: Lola Novaković
- Songwriters: Jože Privšek; Drago Britvić

Placement
- Final result: 4th, 10 points

Participation chronology

Yugoslavia was represented at the Eurovision Song Contest 1962 with the song "Ne pali svetla u sumrak" (Не пали светла у сумрак), composed by Jože Privšek, with lyrics by Drago Britvić, and performed by Lola Novaković. The Yugoslavian participating broadcaster, Jugoslavenska radiotelevizija (JRT), selected its entry through Jugovizija 1962.

== Before Eurovision ==
=== Jugovizija 1962 ===
Jugoslavenska radiotelevizija (JRT) held the national final to select its entry for the Eurovision Song Contest 1962 on 23 January at 20:20 CET at the Đuro Salaj Workers' home in Zagreb. The host was Mladen Delić. There were 18 songs in the final from three subnational public broadcasters (RTV Belgrade, RTV Ljubljana, and RTV Zagreb). The winner was chosen by the votes of an eight-member jury of experts, one juror for each of the six republics and the two autonomous provinces. The winning entry was "Ne pali svetla u sumrak", performed by Serbian singer Lola Novaković, composed by Jože Privšek and written by Dragutin Britvić. She previously came 4th in the 1961 Yugoslav Final.

Final – 23 January 1962 (Note: The running order is unknown)
Broadcaster	Artist	Song	Result
(Socialist Republic of Croatia) RTV Zagreb	Beti Jurković	"Mi mali" (Ми мали)	—N/a
(Socialist Republic of Serbia) RTV Belgrade	Đorđe Marjanović	"Bezimena" (Безимена)	—N/a
(Socialist Republic of Slovenia) RTV Ljubljana	Gabi Novak	"Imirzada"	—N/a
(Socialist Republic of Croatia) RTV Zagreb	Gabi Novak	"Jesen na rubu ulice" (Јесен на рубу улице)	—N/a
(Socialist Republic of Croatia) RTV Zagreb	Gabi Novak	"Oh kako tužna devojka" (Ох како тужна девојка)	—N/a
(Socialist Republic of Croatia) RTV Zagreb	Ivo Robić	"Alija" (Алија)	—N/a
(Socialist Republic of Serbia) RTV Belgrade	Lola Novaković	"Ne ostavljaj me samu" (Не остављај ме саму)	—N/a
(Socialist Republic of Slovenia) RTV Ljubljana	Majda Sepe	"Sulamit"	—N/a
(Socialist Republic of Slovenia) RTV Ljubljana	Stane Mančini	"Jesenja"	—N/a
(Socialist Republic of Slovenia) RTV Ljubljana	Lola Novaković	"Ne pali svetlo u sumrak" (Не пали светло у сумрак)	1
(Socialist Republic of Slovenia) RTV Ljubljana	Marjana Deržaj	"Pomahaj mi v slovo"	—N/a
(Socialist Republic of Slovenia) RTV Ljubljana	Marjana Deržaj	"Moj Peter"	—N/a
(Socialist Republic of Serbia) RTV Belgrade	Nada Knežević	"Ćuti željo" (Ћути жељо)	—N/a
(Socialist Republic of Serbia) RTV Belgrade	Predrag Gojković	"Od sutra" (Од сутра)	—N/a
(Socialist Republic of Serbia) RTV Belgrade	Senka Veletanlić-Petrović	"Pesma noći" (Песма ноћи)	—N/a
(Socialist Republic of Serbia) RTV Belgrade	Senka Veletanlić-Petrović	"Dete rata" (Дете рата)	—N/a
(Socialist Republic of Croatia) RTV Zagreb	Vice Vukov	"Dolazak" (Долазак)	—N/a
(Socialist Republic of Croatia) RTV Zagreb	Vice Vukov	"Ti" (Ти)	—N/a

== At Eurovision ==
The contest was broadcast on Televizija Beograd, Televizija Zagreb, and Televizija Ljubljana.

Lola Novaković performed 12th on the night of the Contest following Switzerland and preceding United Kingdom. At the close of the voting the song had received 10 points, placing 4th equal in a field of 16 competing countries.

=== Voting ===
Points awarded to Yugoslavia
Score	Country
3 points	France; Italy
2 points	Sweden
1 point	Belgium; Finland

Points awarded by Yugoslavia
Score	Country
3 points	France
2 points	United Kingdom
1 point	Italy
