= Denmark in the Eurovision Song Contest 1962 =

- Eurovision Song Contest 1962
- Participating broadcaster: Danmarks Radio (DR)
- Country: Denmark
- Selection process: Dansk Melodi Grand Prix 1962
- Selection date: 11 February 1962

Competing entry
- Song: "Vuggevise"
- Artist: Ellen Winther
- Songwriters: Kjeld Bonfils; Sejr Volmer-Sørensen

Placement
- Final result: 10th, 2 points

Participation chronology

Denmark was represented at the Eurovision Song Contest 1962 with the song "Vuggevise", composed by Kjeld Bonfils, with lyrics by Sejr Volmer-Sørensen, and performed by Ellen Winther. The Danish participating broadcaster, Danmarks Radio (DR), organised the Dansk Melodi Grand Prix 1962 in order to select its entry for the contest.

== Before Eurovision ==
=== Dansk Melodi Grand Prix 1962 ===
Danmarks Radio (DR) held the Dansk Melodi Grand Prix 1962 on 11 February at the Tivoli Concert Hall in Copenhagen, hosted by Hanne Sommer and Svend Pedersen.

The national final was broadcast on Danmarks Radio TV and on radio station Program 2. It was also broadcast on NRK Fjernsynet.

Six songs had been lined up to participate, but "Jeg snakker med mig selv", a swing-style song to be performed by Gitte Hænning, was disqualified before the event in an exceptionally strict interpretation of pre-performance rules, when the song's composer was heard whistling the melody in the canteen of DR. It is widely believed in Danish Eurovision circles that "Jeg snakker med mig selv" would have won that year's DMGP, and would also have done much better at Eurovision than the song which was ultimately sent.

Five songs remained after the disqualification, with the winner chosen a by jury. It is not known how many jury members there were, nor the means by which songs were scored. Previous Danish representatives Birthe Wilke and Dario Campeotto were among the other participants. Each song were performed twice. First with a big orchestra and then with a small orchestra. The winner was the song performed with the big orchestra.

Melodi Grand Prix - 11 February 1962
First Performance		Second Performance		Song	Songwriter(s)	Points	Place
R/O	Artist	R/O	Artist	Song	Songwriter(s)	Points	Place
1	Chris Dane	8	Dario Campeotto	"Et yndigt strejf af din parfume"	Olaf Becker; Børge Nordlund	1	5
2	Ellen Winther	7	Gitte Hænning	"Vuggevise"	Kjeld Bonfils; Sejr Volmer-Sørensen	27	1
3	Baard Owe	9	Pedro Biker	"Er det virk'lig sandt?"	Kjeld Bonfils; Sejr Volmer-Sørensen	5	3
4	Birthe Wilke	6	Ellen Winther	"Et eventyr"	Carl Andersen; Vilfred Kjær	5	3
5	Dario Campeotto	10	Chris Dane	"Carissima"	Annelise Bredsdorff; Bjarne Hoyer	7	2

== At Eurovision ==
The contest was broadcast on Danmarks Radio TV and on radio station Program 2 (both with commentary by Ole Mortensen).

On the evening of the final Winther performed 5th in the running order, following Austria and preceding Sweden. Each national jury awarded 3-2-1 to its top 3 songs and at the close of voting "Vuggevise" had received 2 points (1 each from Italy and Sweden), placing Denmark joint 10th (with Norway and Switzerland) of the 16 entries. The Danish jury awarded its 3 points to Sweden.

=== Voting ===
Points awarded to Denmark
Score	Country
3 points	
2 points	
1 point	Italy; Sweden

Points awarded by Denmark
Score	Country
3 points	Sweden
2 points	United Kingdom
1 point	Germany
