= François Deguelt =

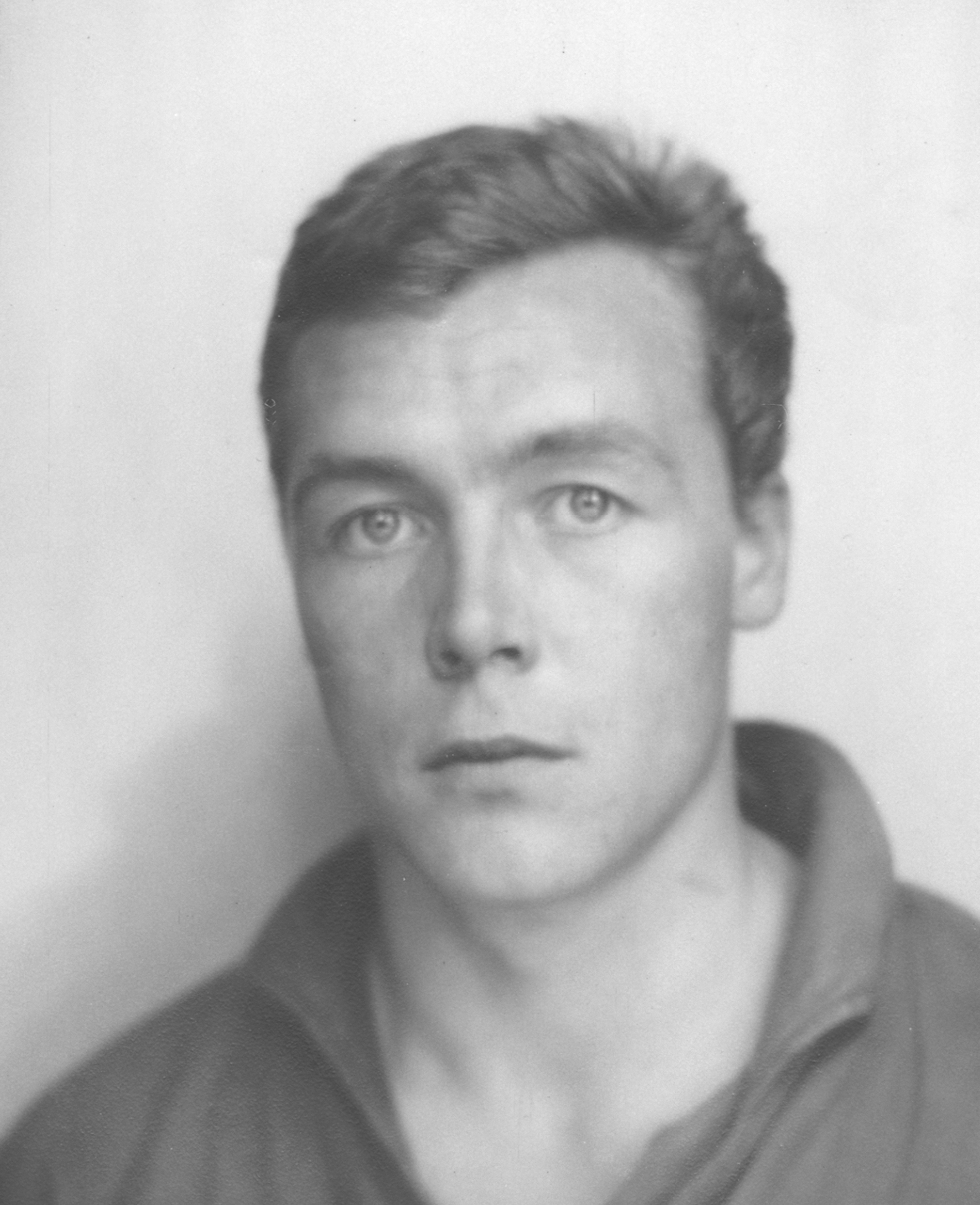
- François Deguelt in 1964. ID photo (Sacem)

Background information
- Born: Louis Deghelt; 4 December 1932; Tarbes, Hautes-Pyrénées, France
- Died: 22 January 2014 (aged 81) Var, Provence-Alpes-Côte d'Azur, France
- Genres: Pop, Chanson
- Occupation: Singer

François Deguelt (French pronunciation: [fʁɑ̃swa dəgɛl], born Louis Deghelt; 4 December 1932 – 22 January 2014) was a French singer, best known for his participation on behalf of Monaco in the Eurovision Song Contests of 1960 and 1962.

== Biography ==
Deguelt gave up his studies to become a cabaret singer in Paris in the early 1950s. In 1956, he was the winner of the Grand Prix du Disque of the Académie Charles Cros. Following a period of military service in Algeria, Deguelt returned to France, and was offered the chance in 1960 to sing for Monaco in the fifth Eurovision Song Contest, held in London on 29 March. Deguelt's song "Ce soir-là" ("That Night") proved popular with the juries, finishing in third place of the 13 entrants.

Deguelt returned to Eurovision, again representing Monaco, in 1962 with the song "Dis rien" ("Say Nothing"). This contest took place on 18 March in Luxembourg City, where he went one better by finishing second of 16 participants. Deguelt is one of five acts in Eurovision history (alongside Cliff Richard, Katja Ebstein, Chiara Siracusa and Zeljko Joksimovic) to have finished second and third without having won.

Deguelt's later successful singles included "Le Ciel, le soleil et la mer" (1965), "Le printemps" (1966), "Minuit, le vent, la nuit" (1968) and "La libération" (1968). He continued to tour and perform on the nostalgia circuit throughout the Francophone world until his death. He died at the age of 81 on 22 January 2014.

Preceded by Jacques Pills	Monaco in the Eurovision Song Contest; 1960	Succeeded by Colette Deréal
Preceded by Colette Deréal	Monaco in the Eurovision Song Contest; 1962	Succeeded by Françoise Hardy
