= France in the Eurovision Song Contest 1962 =

- Eurovision Song Contest 1962
- Participating broadcaster: Radiodiffusion-Télévision Française (RTF)
- Country: France
- Selection process: Internal selection

Competing entry
- Song: "Un premier amour"
- Artist: Isabelle Aubret
- Songwriters: Roland Valade; Claude-Henri Vic

Placement
- Final result: 1st, 26 points

Participation chronology

France was represented at the Eurovision Song Contest 1962 with the song "Un premier amour", composed by Claude-Henri Vic, with lyrics by Roland Valade, and performed by Isabelle Aubret. The French participating broadcaster, Radiodiffusion-Télévision Française (RTF), internally selected its entry for the contest. The entry eventually won the Eurovision Song Contest.

== Before Eurovision ==
=== Internal selection ===
An internal selection was held by Radiodiffusion-Télévision Française (RTF) to determine its entry for the contest. "Un premier amour" composed by Claude-Henri Vic with lyrics by Roland Valade was chosen as the French entry, Isabelle Aubret was chosen as singer. The song was recorded and presented to television viewers during the television show La soirée du disque, aired on 12 March at 20:30 CET. At the beginning of this special program, Aubret recorded the song live on magnetic tape, followed by the physical and chemical production process of the LP record disc. At the end of the show, Aubret signed the finished record for viewers.

== At Eurovision ==
On the night of the final Aubret performed 9th in the running order, following the Netherlands and preceding Norway. At the close of the voting "Un premier amour" had received 26 points, placing France 1st of the 16 competing entries, 13 points ahead of the runner-up Monaco. This was the third time France won the contest, having previously won in 1958 and 1960, and making it the first country to win the contest three times.

=== Voting ===
Every participating broadcaster assembled a jury panel of ten people. Each jury gave three, two and one points to their three favourite songs.

Points awarded to France
Score	Country
3 points	Switzerland; Sweden; Norway; Yugoslavia; Germany
2 points	Austria; Belgium; Italy; Spain
1 point	Luxembourg; Monaco; United Kingdom

Points awarded by France
Score	Country
3 points	Yugoslavia
2 points	Norway
1 point	Monaco
