= Inger Berggren =

Swedish singer (1934–2019)

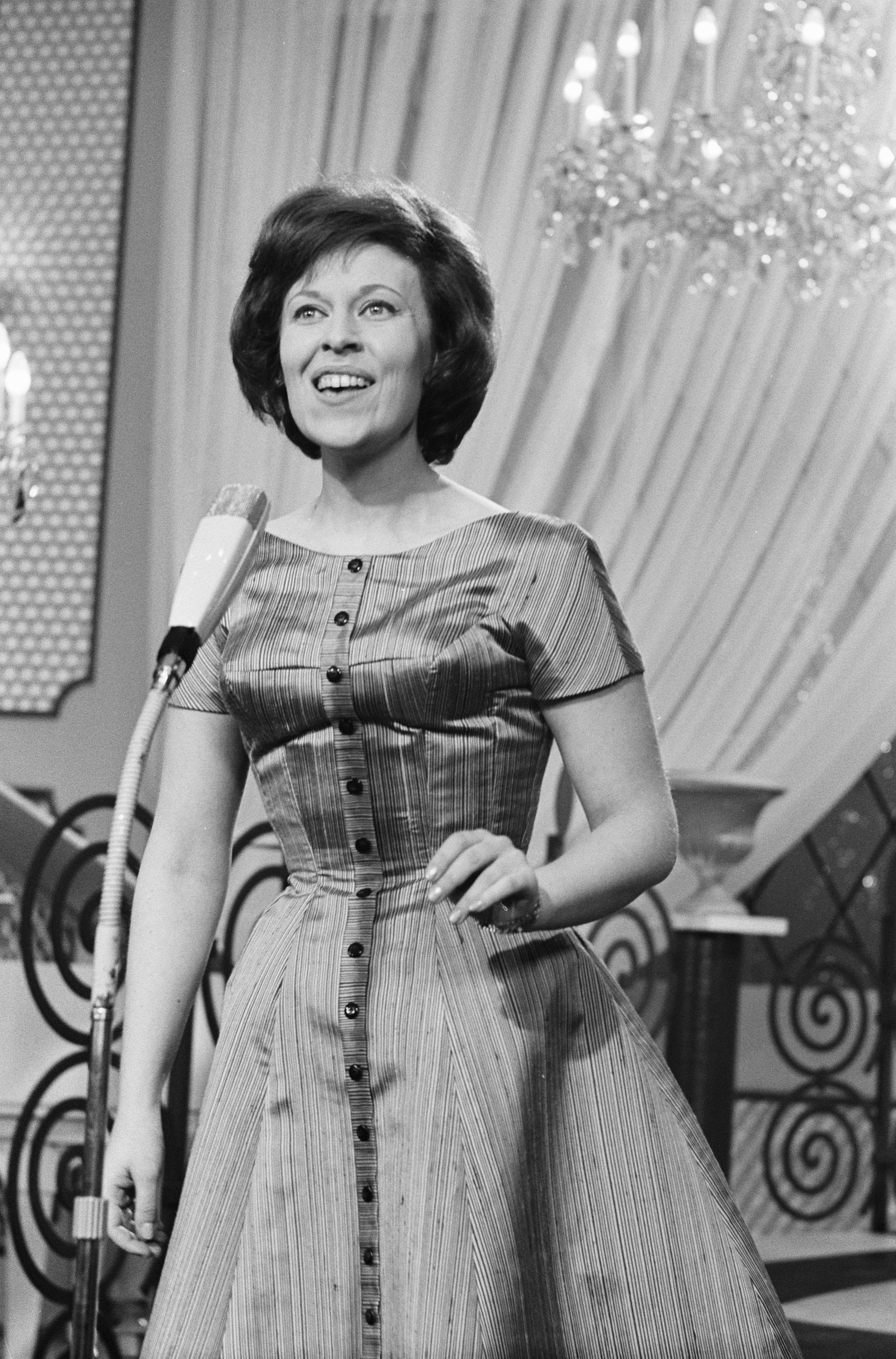
- Inger Berggren at the Eurovision Song Contest 1962

Background information
- Born: 23 February 1934; Stockholm, Sweden
- Died: 19 July 2019 (aged 85); Stockholm, Sweden
- Genres: Schlager
- Occupation: Singer
- Years active: 1952–?

Inger Berggren (23 February 1934 – 19 July 2019) was a Swedish singer. Her biggest hits were "Sol och vår" and "Elisabeth serenad", both in 1962.

Berggren was born in Stockholm. She began her vocal career with Thore Swanerud's orchestra, and later sang with Thore Ehrling, Simon Brehm, and Göte Wilhelmsson. Berggren represented Sweden in the Eurovision Song Contest 1962 in Luxembourg with the song "Sol och vår" which was placed seventh. She was the mother of the actress Gunilla Röör.

She died on 19 July 2019 at the age of 85.

== Filmography ==
- 1973 – Andersson's Kalle on Top Form
- 1984 – Sömnen

Awards and achievements
Preceded by Lill-Babs with "April, April"	Sweden in the Eurovision Song Contest; 1962	Succeeded by Monica Zetterlund with "En gång i Stockholm"
