= Inger Jacobsen =

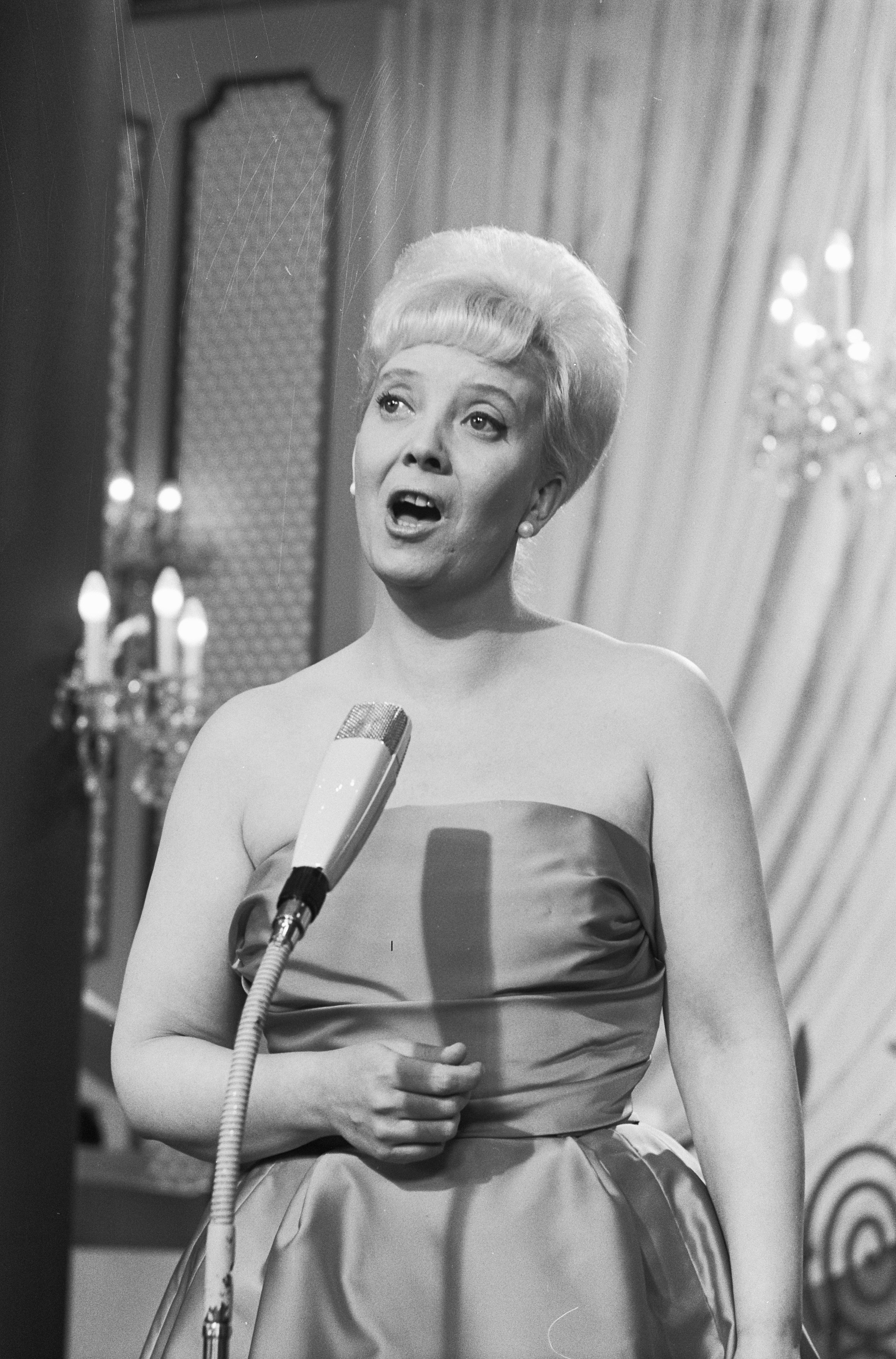
- Inger Jacobsen at the Eurovision Song Contest 1962

Background information
- Born: Inger Johanne Jacobsen; 13 October 1923; Christiania, Norway
- Origin: Oslo, Norway
- Died: 21 July 1996 (aged 72) Oslo, Norway
- Genres: Pop
- Occupation: Singer
- Website: www.mic.no/nmi.nsf/doc/art2006051610224472698558

Inger Johanne Jacobsen (13 October 1923 – 21 July 1996) was a Norwegian singer and actress, known for her participation in the 1962 Eurovision Song Contest.

== Career ==
Jacobsen made her first recordings during World War II and became a popular singer and actress in the post-war period, appearing often on television and radio, and in films and stage productions, until shortly before her death. From 1976 she was a member of the travelling Riksteateret. Her best-known record is " Frøken Johansen og jeg", which topped the Norwegian chart in 1960.

== 1962 Eurovision Song Contest ==
In 1962, Jacobsen entered the Norwegian Melodi Grand Prix (the national Eurovision selection), and was chosen to represent the country at the seventh Eurovision Song Contest with the song "Kom sol, kom regn" ("Come Sun, Come Rain"). The contest was held in Luxembourg City on 18 March, where "Kom sol, kom regn" finished in joint tenth place of the 16 entries, having picked up just two votes, both from the French jury.

Jacobsen later made two more unsuccessful attempts in Melodi Grand Prix; in 1964, she came fourth with "Hvor" ("Where") while her 1971 entry "India" finished an ignominious last of the 12 songs.

== Death ==
Jacobsen was known to be a private individual who avoided the world of celebrity and preferred to keep details of her personal life out of the public eye. She died of cancer on 21 July 1996, aged 72.

Awards and achievements
Preceded by Nora Brockstedt with "Sommer i Palma"	Norway in the Eurovision Song Contest; 1962	Succeeded by Anita Thallaug with "Solhverv"
