= Belgium in the Eurovision Song Contest 1962 =

- Eurovision Song Contest 1962
- Participating broadcaster: Radiodiffusion-télévision belge (RTB)
- Country: Belgium
- Selection process: Finale Belge du Grand Prix Eurovision 1962 de la Chanson Européenne
- Selection date: 19 February 1962

Competing entry
- Song: "Ton nom"
- Artist: Fud Leclerc
- Songwriters: Eric Channe; Tony Golan

Placement
- Final result: 13th, 0 points

Participation chronology

Belgium was represented at the Eurovision Song Contest 1962 with the song "Ton nom", composed by Eric Channe, with lyrics by Tony Golan, and performed by Fud Leclerc. The Belgian participating broadcaster, French-speaking Radiodiffusion-télévision belge (RTB), selected its entry through a national final. This was Leclerc's fourth time at Eurovision, and he still shares the record (with Elisabeth Andreassen, Peter, Sue & Marc, and Valentina Monetta) for the most Eurovision appearances as a main performer. "Ton nom" has also gone down in history as the first Eurovision performance ever to score nul-points.

== Before Eurovision ==
=== Finale Belge du Grand Prix Eurovision 1962 de la Chanson Européenne ===
Finale Belge du Grand Prix Eurovision 1962 de la Chanson Européenne was the national final format developed by French-speaking broadcaster Radiodiffusion-télévision belge (RTB) in order to select the Belgian entry for the Eurovision Song Contest 1962. The competition was held on 1 February 1962 at the Cultural and Artistic Center in Uccle and aired on 19 February at 20:30 CET.

==== Final ====
The final was held on 1 February 1962 and later aired on 19 February 1962. The songs were first performed as instrumentals by the orchestra and then performed again with the singers. "Ton nom", performed by Fud Leclerc, was selected as the winning song by a 10-member jury, headed by Robert Ledent. Only the winner was announced.

19 February 1962
| R/O | Artist | Song | Songwriter(s) | | Place |
| R/O | Artist | Song | Composer(s) | Lyricist(s) | Place |
|---|---|---|---|---|---|
| 1 | Any Godet | "Hambourg, l'oubli" | Robert Hancre; Any Godet | | —N/a |
| 2 | Eric Channe | "Toi, la femme" | Eric Channe | | —N/a |
| 3 | Robert-Charles Lanson | "Toi, mon copain" | Jack Say | Robert-Charles Lanson | —N/a |
| 4 | Ferry Devos | "N'oublie jamais" | Jean Bermont; Jo Brick | | —N/a |
| 5 | Fud Leclerc | "Ton nom" | Eric Channe | Tany Golan | 1 |

== At Eurovision ==
On the evening of the final Leclerc performed second in the running order, following Finland and preceding Spain. Voting was by each national jury awarding 3, 2 and 1 point(s) to their top three songs, and at the close of the voting "Ton nom" had failed to register any points, placing Belgium joint last with three other zero points entries from Austria, the Netherlands and Spain. This was the second consecutive year in which Belgium finished the evening at the foot of the scoreboard. The Belgian jury awarded its 3 points to Luxembourg.

1962 was the first contest in which any entry had failed to score, and although four countries shared the ignominy, Leclerc is usually awarded the dubious accolade of being the first ever Eurovision nul-pointer, due to "Ton nom" having been performed earliest of the four in the running order.

=== Voting ===
Belgium did not receive any points at the Eurovision Song Contest 1962.

Points awarded by Belgium
| Score | Country |
|---|---|
| 3 points | Luxembourg |
| 2 points | France |
| 1 point | Yugoslavia |
