= Natalia Figueroa =

Spanish journalist, writer and noblewoman (born 1939)

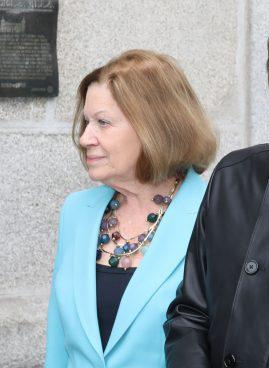
- Born: Natalia Figueroa Gamboa; 10 August 1939 (age 87); San Sebastián, Spain
- Occupations: Journalist; writer; tv host
- Spouse: Raphael (m. 1972)
- Children: 4
- Father: Agustín de Figueroa
- Relatives: Manuel Alonso Martínez (great-grandfather)
- Awards: Antena de Oro

Natalia Figueroa Gamboa (born 10 August 1939) is a Spanish journalist, writer and noblewoman.

== Biography ==
Born into a family of aristocrats, she is the daughter of Agustín de Figueroa, Marquis of Santo Floro, granddaughter of the Count of Romanones and great-granddaughter of Manuel Alonso Martínez; He decided from a very young age to dedicate himself to the world of communication.

She took her first steps in television, when she was hired by Televisión Española to present some episodes of the series Por los caminos de España (1966). At that time, she also cultivated translation, such as the play The Vanished Horse (1967), by Françoise Sagan.

Later she would present, always on the public channel, Luz verde (1966–1968), a magazine directed by Antonio Mercero and illustrated by Chumy Chúmez, which also allowed him to conduct interviews with very different characters of the moment Nuevas gentes (1968), and Si las piedras hablaran (1972–1973), directed by Mario Camus and scripts by Antonio Gala.

On 14 July 1972, she married the singer Raphael in Venice.

Away from professional activity for some time, she resumed it to collaborate sporadically in the ABC newspaper and later in the newspaper La Razón, in addition to collaborating with María Teresa Campos in the radio program La Tarde de Cope.

For many years she was in legal dispute her brother Agustín for the inheritance of the noble title of Marquisate of Santo Floro.

She is the author of several books, including: Decía el viento (1957), Palabras nuevas (1960) and Tipos de ahora mismo (1970).

In 2007 she made her debut as a voice actress, lending her voice to the Spanish version of the Disney film Meet the Robinsons.

== Awards ==
In 1974, she received the Antena de Oro for her work leading the program Si las piedras hablaran.
