= Jimmy Makulis =

Greek singer

- Makulis in 1960

Background information
- Born: Dimitrios Makoulis; 12 April 1935
- Origin: Athens, Greece
- Died: 28 October 2007 (aged 72)
- Genres: Pop
- Occupation: Singer

Dimitrios Makulis (Greek: Τζίμης Μακούλης; 12 April 1935 in Athens – 28 October 2007 in Athens), known as Jimmy Makulis, was a Greek singer who had a successful career in German-speaking markets in the 1950s and 1960s, and is known for his participation on behalf of Austria in the 1961 Eurovision Song Contest.

== Early career ==
Makulis became a successful singer in his native Greece before moving to Germany in the mid-1950s. In 1956 he scored a top 5 hit with "Auf Cuba sind die Mädchen braun". His biggest hit was "Gitarren klingen leise durch die Nacht", No.4 in 1959, and he continued to place charting singles until 1964.

== Eurovision ==
In 1961, Makulis was chosen internally by Austrian broadcaster ORF to represent the country with the song "Sehnsucht" ("Longing") in the sixth Eurovision Song Contest, held on 18 March in Cannes, France. This proved unsuccessful, as "Sehnsucht" picked up only one point, from the United Kingdom jury, and finished along with Belgium's Bob Benny in joint last place of the 16 entries. "Sehnsucht" is one of very few Eurovision entries never to have been recorded by the performer.

Makulis was the first Greek to participate in the Eurovision Song Contest, although Greece itself first participated only 13 years later, in 1974.

== Later career ==
Makulis moved to the United States in 1965, and in following years lived and performed in Las Vegas. He moved back to his native Greece in 1985, and in 1990 took part in the selection for that year's Greek Eurovision entry, finishing fifth. He returned to Germany in the early 1990s.

== Death ==
Makulis died following heart surgery in an Athens hospital on 28 October 2007, aged 72.

== Singles discography ==
(Shows highest position reached on German Singles Chart)

- 1956: "Auf Cuba sind die Mädchen braun" (#5)
- 1959: "Gitarren klingen leise durch die Nacht" (#4)
- 1960: "Nachts in Rom" (#9)
- 1960: "Ein Boot, eine Mondnacht und du" (#36)
- 1961: "Sweetheart Guitar" (#10)
- 1962: "Ich habe im Leben nur dich" (#17)
- 1962: "Keiner weiß wohin" (#43)
- 1962: "Weil ich weiß, daß wir uns wiederseh'n" (#37)
- 1963: "Lebe wohl, du Blume von Tahiti" (#43)
- 1964: "Little Moonlight Love" (#38)

Preceded by Harry Winter	Austria in the Eurovision Song Contest; 1961	Succeeded by Eleonore Schwarz
