= De Spelbrekers =

Dutch singing duo

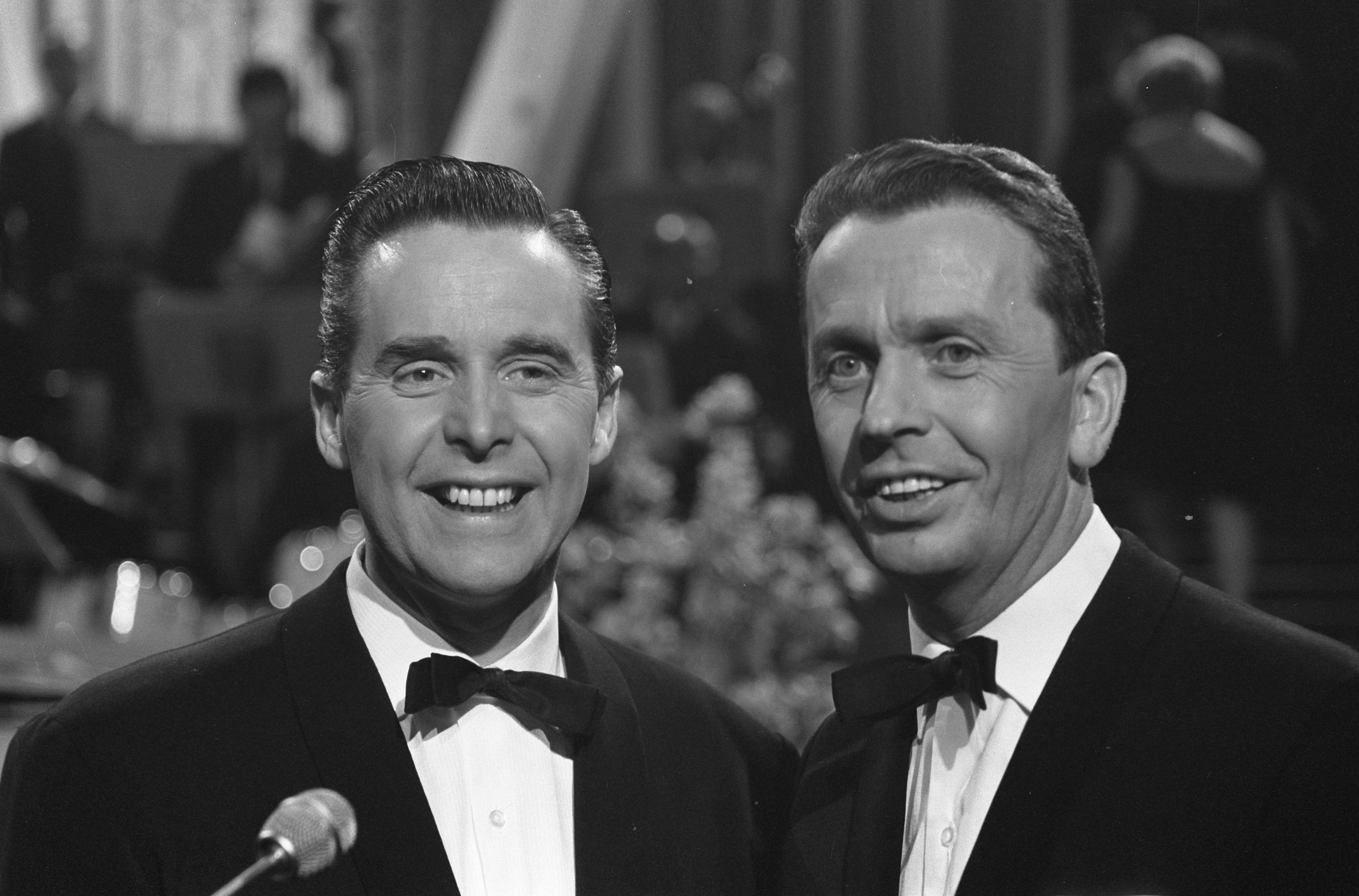
- De Spelbrekers in 1962
- Members: Theo Rekkers; Huug Kok

De Spelbrekers (The Spoilsports) were a Dutch singing duo, consisting of Theo Rekkers (24 April 1924 – 20 April 2012) and Huug Kok (19 February 1918 – 27 October 2011). They were known for their participation in the Eurovision Song Contest 1962, representing the Netherlands.

== Career ==
=== 1940s and 1950s ===
Rekkers and Kok met during World War II at a munitions factory in Bremen, Germany, where they were working as forced labourers. They formed De Spelbrekers in 1945, after the war had ended. Their recording career began in 1950, and they released numerous singles during the decade, the most successful being "Oh wat ben je mooi" which reached #5 in the Dutch charts in 1956.

=== Eurovision Song Contest ===
In 1962, De Spelbrekers took part in the Dutch national selection for the Eurovision Song Contest, and won with the song "Katinka". They went on to participate in the Eurovision Song Contest 1962, held in Luxembourg City on 18 March. In a field of 16 contestants, "Katinka" was one of four songs (the others being the entries from Belgium, Spain and Austria) which failed to score. During De Spelbrekers performance at the Eurovision Song Contest 1962, there was a power cut that seemed to turn the lights down during parts of De Spelbrekers performance. This very well could have been a reason for the nul points. This was the first year in which any songs had failed to register at all on the Eurovision scoreboard. Nevertheless, "Katinka" proved a success within the Netherlands, and has gone on to become one of the country's better-remembered and recognised Eurovision entries.

=== Later career ===
The duo never managed to recapture the success of "Oh wat ben je mooi" and "Katinka", and after years of releasing further singles to ever-declining interest, they decided in the mid-1970s to move into music management, their clients including André van Duin, Ben Cramer and Saskia & Serge.

Awards and achievements
Preceded by Greetje Kauffeld with "Wat een dag"	Netherlands in the Eurovision Song Contest; 1962	Succeeded by Annie Palmen with "Een speeldoos"
