= Sweden in the Eurovision Song Contest 1962 =

- Eurovision Song Contest 1962
- Participating broadcaster: Sveriges Radio (SR)
- Country: Sweden
- Selection process: National final
- Selection date: 13 February 1962

Competing entry
- Song: "Sol och vår"
- Artist: Inger Berggren
- Songwriters: Åke Gerhard; Ulf Källqvist

Placement
- Final result: 7th, 4 points

Participation chronology

Sweden was represented at the Eurovision Song Contest 1962 with the song "Sol och vår", written by Åke Gerhard and Ulf Källqvist, and performed by Inger Berggren. The Swedish participating broadcaster, Sveriges Radio (SR), selected its entry through a national final titled Eurovisionsschlagern, svensk final.

At the Eurovision Song Contest, held in Luxembourg, Berggren came 7th out of 16.

== Eurovisionsschlagern, svensk final ==
Eurovisionsschlagern, svensk final (retroactively often referred to as Melodifestivalen 1962) was the selection for the fifth song to represent Sweden at the Eurovision Song Contest. It was the fourth time that Sveriges Radio (SR) used this system of picking a song. One singer performed the song with a large orchestra and one with a smaller orchestra. Seven songs were submitted to SR for the competition, of which one was disqualified. The final was held in the Cirkus in Stockholm on 13 February 1962, broadcast on Sveriges Radio TV but was not broadcast on radio. The winner was decided by postcard voting.

Artist^{1}	Artist^{2}	Song	Songwriters	Votes	Place
Inger Berggren	Lily Berglund	"Sol och vår"	Ulf Källqvist, Åke Gerhard	102,327	1
Monica Zetterlund	Carli Tornehave	"När min vän"	Owe Thörnqvist	74,077	2
Carli Tornehave	Otto Brandenburg	"Anne-Li"	Per Lindqvist	13,401	3
Otto Brandenburg	Östen Warnerbring	"Lolo-Lolita"	Bobbie Ericson, Bo Eneby	11,848	4
Lily Berglund	Inger Berggren	"Sagans underbara värld"	Britt Lindeborg	6,885	5
Östen Warnerbring	Mona Grain	"Trollen ska trivas"	Ulf Peder Olrog	4,001	6

- 1: Performer with large orchestra
- 2: Performer with smaller orchestra

== At Eurovision ==
=== Voting ===
Points awarded to Sweden
Score	Country
3 points	Denmark
2 points	
1 point	Netherlands

Points awarded by Sweden
Score	Country
3 points	France
2 points	Yugoslavia
1 point	Denmark
