= Netherlands in the Eurovision Song Contest 1962 =

- Eurovision Song Contest 1962
- Participating broadcaster: Nederlandse Televisie Stichting (NTS)
- Country: Netherlands
- Selection process: Nationaal Songfestival 1962
- Selection date: 27 February 1962

Competing entry
- Song: "Katinka"
- Artist: De Spelbrekers
- Songwriters: Joop Stokkermans; Henny Hamhuis; Lodewijk Post

Placement
- Final result: 13th, 0 points

Participation chronology

The Netherlands was represented at the Eurovision Song Contest 1962 with the song "Katinka", written by Joop Stokkermans, Henny Hamhuis, and Lodewijk Post, and performed by De Spelbrekers. The Dutch participating Broadcaster, Nederlandse Televisie Stichting (NTS), selected its entry through a national final.

== Before Eurovision ==
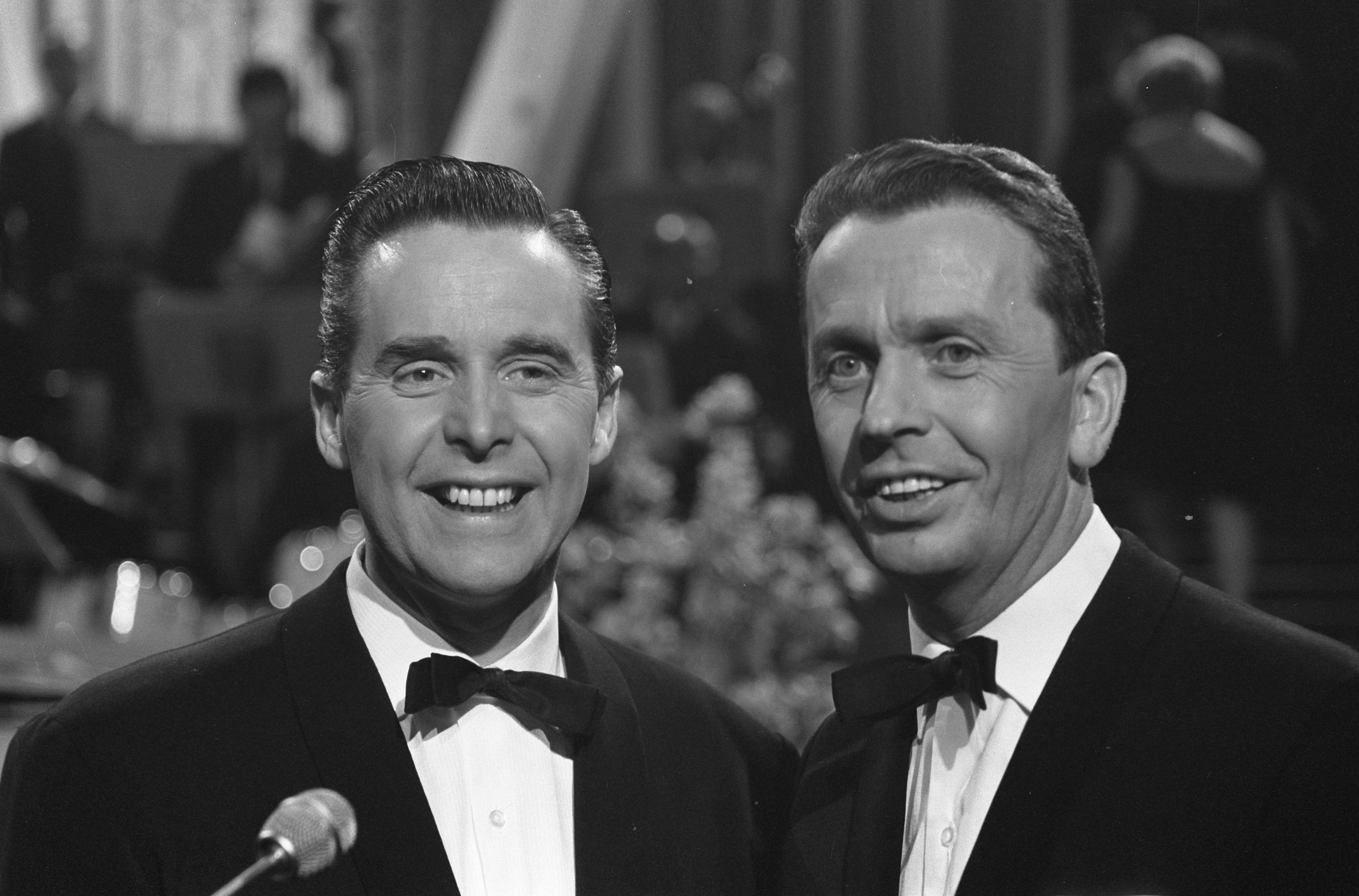
De Spelbrekers was selected to represent Netherlands in the Eurovision Song Contest 1962

=== Nationaal Songfestival 1962 ===
The national final was held at the Theater Concordia in Bussum, hosted by Hannie Lips and Elisabeth Mooy. Seven songs took part and the winning song was chosen by 12 regional juries, each with 60 points to divide between the songs. Conny Vandenbos, who would represent the Netherlands in 1965, was one of the participants. "Katinka" performed by De Spelbrekers emerged the clear winner by a 28-point margin.

27 February 1962
R/O	Artist	Song	Points	Place
1	Rita Corita	"Carnaval"	120	4
2	De Spelbrekers	"Katinka"	169	1
3	Joke van den Burg	"Het is voorbij"	98	5
4	Ella Raya	"Heb je nog die mooie oude grachten?"	21	7
5	Gert Timmerman	"Niets"	141	2
6	Conny Vandenbos	"Zachtjes"	138	3
7	Pat Berry	"Wees zuinig op de wereld"	33	6

== At Eurovision ==
On the night of the final De Spelbrekers performed 8th in the running order, following Germany and preceding eventual contest winner France. Voting was by each national jury, awarding 3, 2 and 1 points to their top three songs, and at the end of the evening ,"Katinka" (along with the entries from Austria, Belgium, and Spain) had failed to pick up a single point, the second time the Netherlands had finished at the foot of the scoreboard. 1962 was the first contest in which any entry failed to score, but the "honour" of being Eurovision's first ever null-pointer is generally awarded to Belgium's Fud Leclerc, as he had performed earliest of the four in the running order. The Dutch jury awarded its 3 points to Monaco.

The Dutch conductor at the contest was Dolf van der Linden.

Despite its poor showing at Eurovision, "Katinka" was a big domestic hit and remains one of the better-remembered Dutch Eurovision entries from the contest's early years.

=== Voting ===
The Netherlands did not receive any points at the Eurovision Song Contest 1962.

Points awarded by the Netherlands
Score	Country
3 points	Monaco
2 points	Germany
1 point	Sweden
