= Carmela Corren =

Israeli singer and actress (1938–2022)

- כרמלה קורן
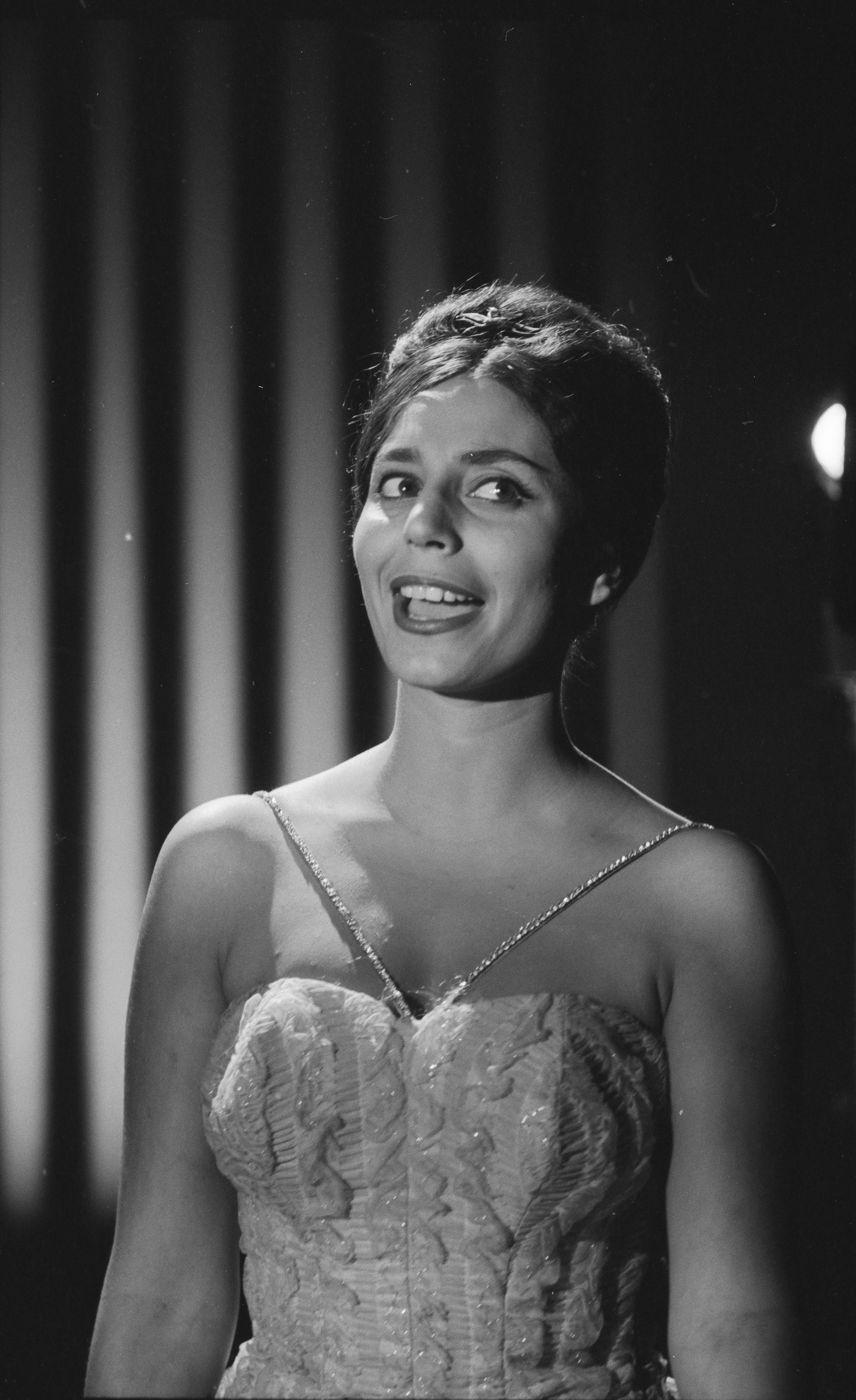
- Corren in 1960
- Born: Carmela Bizman; 13 February 1938; Tel Aviv, Mandatory Palestine
- Died: 15 January 2022 (aged 83); Hollywood, Florida, U.S.
- Occupations: Actress, singer
- Spouse: Horst Geiger (m. 1966; div. 1970)
- Children: 2

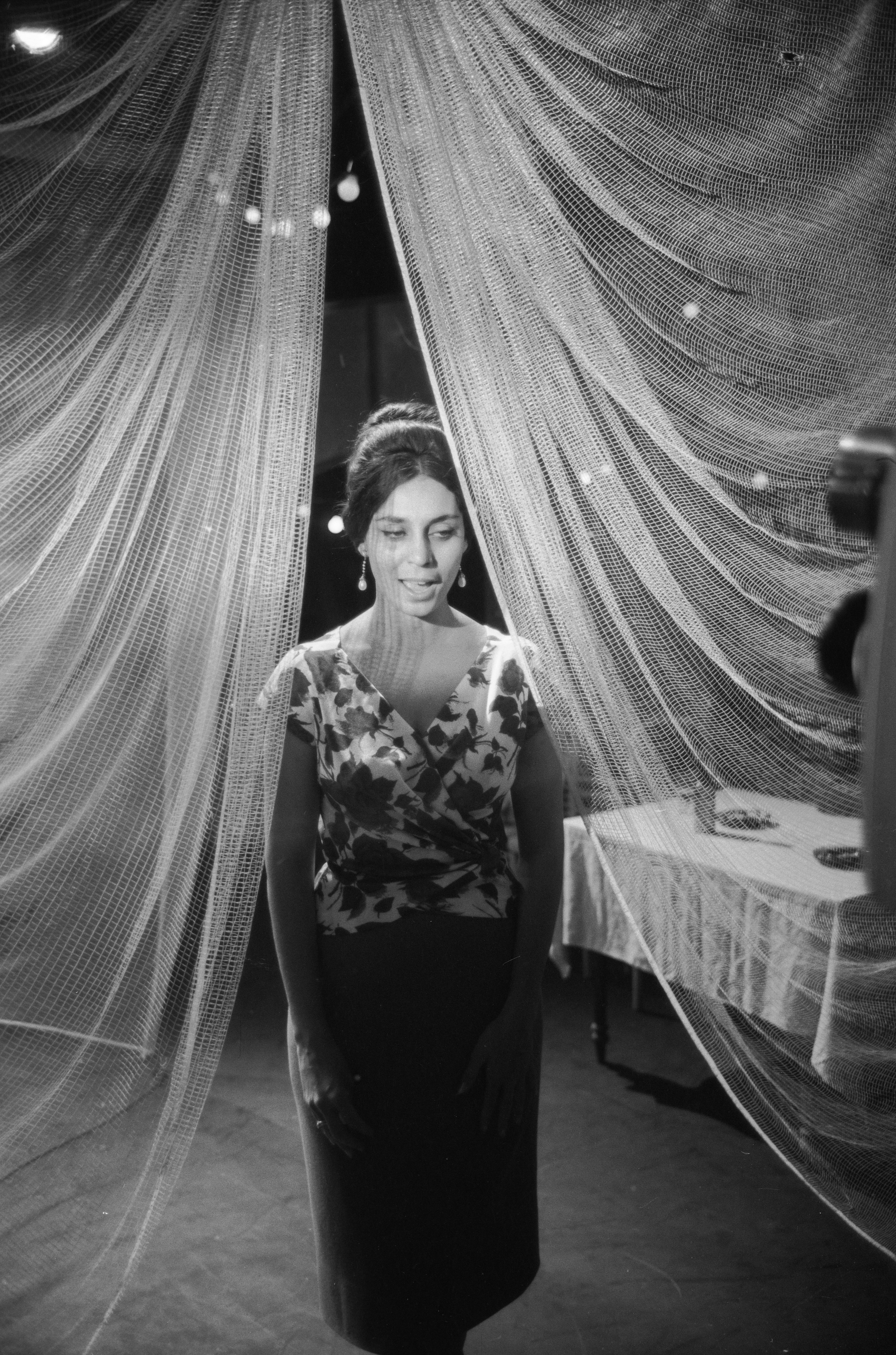
Corren in 1960

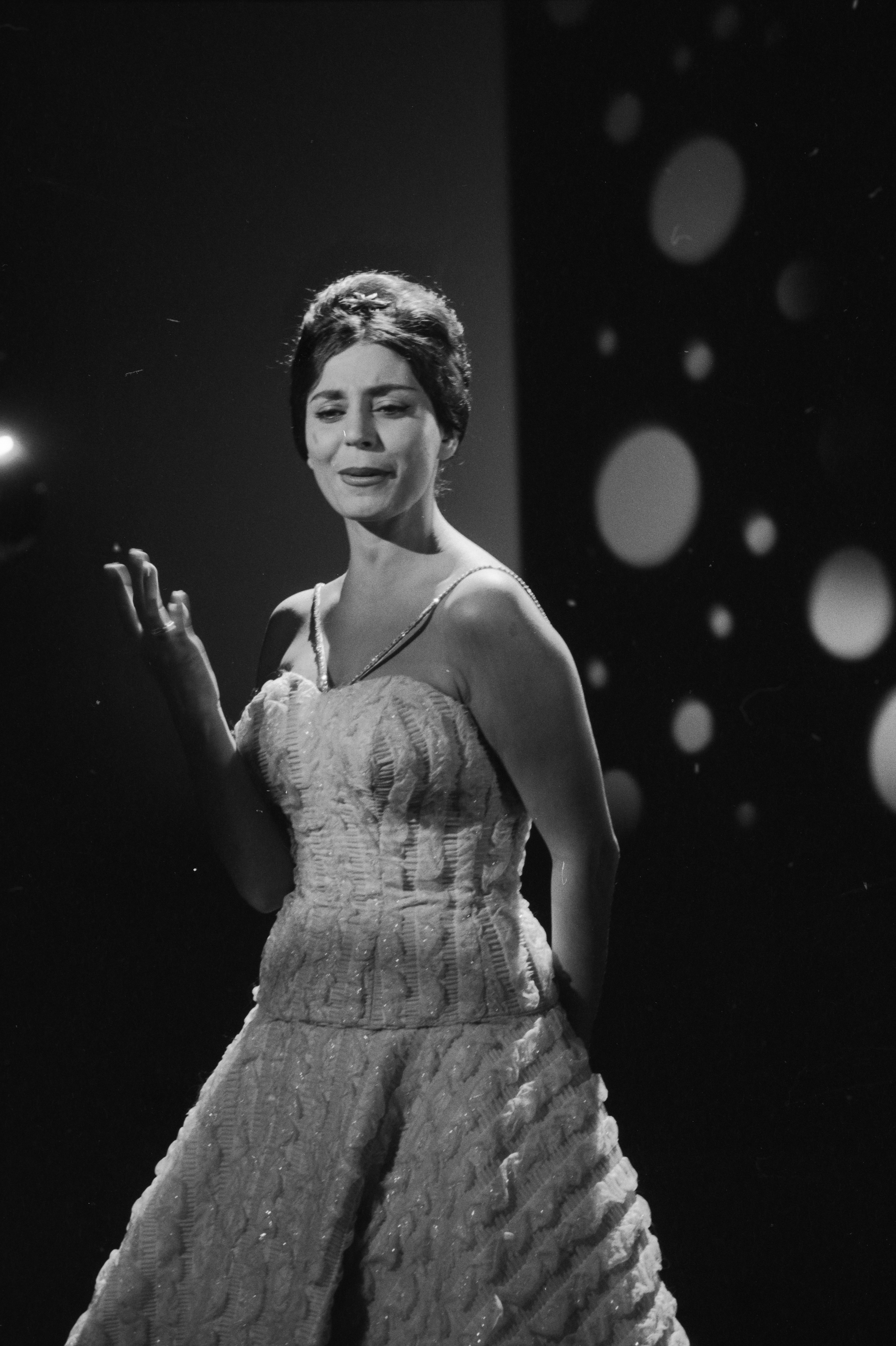
Corren in 1960

Carmela Corren (Hebrew: כרמלה קורן; née Bizman; 13 February 1938 – 15 January 2022) was an Israeli singer and actress.

== Career ==
Corren was born Bizman in Tel Aviv, Mandatory Palestine, on 13 February 1938. She dreamed of being a dancer, but switched to singing in the wake of an injury. American television producer Ed Sullivan discovered her in 1956 during a work venture in Jerusalem. Corren, just out of military service, was persuaded to come to New York to appear on his show. She later toured South Africa with Cliff Richard and sang in English clubs.

Later, she starred in several films and television productions. With the beginning of the 1960s, Corren became well-known in Germany, as well as in Switzerland and Austria. She first signed to the Ariola label, then changed in 1966 to Vogue, and again in 1968 to Decca. In 1963, she represented Austria in the Eurovision Song Contest with her song Vielleicht geschieht ein Wunder (transl. "Maybe a Miracle Will Happen"), where she finished seventh.

== Family ==
From 1966 to 1970, Corren was married to music producer Horst Wilhelm Geiger, with whom she had a daughter and a son. The family lived in Munich, Germany, for several years. After retiring, she moved to the United States, where she settled down in Florida. She died on 15 January 2022, at the age of 83, in Hollywood, Florida.

== Selected discography ==
- Sei nicht traurig, geliebte Mama (You're Not Losing A Daughter, Mama) (1961)
- Eine Rose aus Santa Monica (1962)
- Wann kommt der Tag (1962)
- Vielleicht geschieht ein Wunder (1963) (Maybe A Miracle Will Happen)
- Wer in deine Augen sieht (1963)
- Rosen haben Dornen (1963)
- Einmal reicht uns das Glück seine Hände (1963)
- Abschiednehmen tut so weh (1965)
- Verzeih mir (1966)
- Die Liebe fängt mit Träumen an (1966)
- Alles war ein Traum (Même si tu revenais) (1967)
- Heiß wie die Sonne (Hot like the sun) (1968)
- Tipot Hageshem טיפות הגשם (Raindrops; Hebrew covers of Burt Bacharach)
- Never, never, never (1979)

== Selected filmography ==
- Drei Liebesbriefe aus Tirol (1962)
- Between Shanghai and St. Pauli (1962)
- His Best Friend (1962 film) (1962)
- Don't Fool with Me (1963)
- Hochzeit am Neusiedler See (1963)
