= Kidnapping in South Africa =

Kidnapping in South Africa is a common crime in the country, with over 4,100 in the 2013/2014 period, and a child going missing every five hours.

The 1966 kidnapping for ransom of Etty Glazer for R140,000 was 4 times the ransom paid in the Lindbergh kidnapping and was the highest paid ransom demand in the world at the time.

Walter da Silva, a Brazilian professional footballer, was kidnapped by dissatisfied soccer fans in an attempt to alter the outcome of a 1999 Premier Soccer League clash. He was the coach of Moroka Swallows F.C. at the time. The kidnappers ordered him to phone two of his technical assistants and tell them to leave the match.

In 2004 Benedict Cumberbatch and two friends were kidnapped by 6 armed men near St Lucia, KwaZulu-Natal. Benedict only spoke publicly about it in July 2009 at an interview for a book launched by the Prince's Trust and Starbucks.

On 16 March 2015, 48-year-old Chen Lin, was kidnapped for ransom by four armed men in front of his Kokstad apartment gate. They took him to a property near Bizana, some 80 km away. They contacted his wife, using his phone, and demanded a R2,000,000 (2 Million Rand) ransom. The next day two of the kidnappers left to purchase food in the nearby town. While away, the two remaining kidnappers apparently snorted cocaine, and sometime later fell asleep. At this time Mr Lin managed to free himself, and escape; a passing motorist picked him up and took him to hospital.

== Notable cases ==
Date	Victim(s)	Abductor(s)	Location	Age of victim(s)	Outcome	Notes
30 March 1966	Etty Glazer, Sammy Glazer	Leonard Landou Levy, Ephraim Levy, Stanley Ivan Jawitz	Morningside, Johannesburg	(unknown), 22 months	Returned after ransom was paid.	Etty Glazer and son Sammy were returned safely after a ZAR 140,000 ransom was paid. Etty Glazer was able to recall enough detail of the location they were kept that the police were able to locate it within a day of searching. The kidnappers were arrested and most of the ransom money returned.
8 May 1985	Sipho Hashe, Champion Galela, Qaqawuli Godolozi	Gideon Nieuwoudt, South African Security Police	Port Elizabeth	unknown	Murdered	The three men were apprehended by members of the Security Police and taken to an abandoned police station at Post Chalmers, near Cradock, Eastern Cape. They were then interrogated, beaten and finally strangled. The bodies were burned and the remains were thrown into the nearby Fish River.
1 August 1988 - 11 January 1990	Tracy-Lee Scott-Crossley, Fiona Harvey, Joan Horn, Rosa Piel, Odette Boucher, Anne-Mari Wapenaar, Yolanda Wessels, Joan Booysen	Cornelius Gerhardus 'Gert' van Rooyen, Joey Haarhoff	Randburg, Pietermaritzburg, Pretoria, Durban	9 - 16	Still missing apart from Joan Horn (released) and Joan Booysen (escaped)	Van Rooyen was linked to most of the missing girls in some way, however he shot his accomplice Joey, and then himself just before the police could arrest him. Most cases remain unsolved as the bodies have not been found.
29 December 1988	Stompie Moeketsi, Kenny Kgase, Pelo Mekgwe, Thabiso Mono	Winnie Mandela's bodyguards	Orlando, Soweto	14	One killed, three beaten but released.	Moeketsi and 3 others were accused of being police informers. While the other 3 survived a severe beating, Moeketsi had his throat cut.
30 April 1997	Zephany Nurse	(Protected by court order)	Groote Schuur Hospital, Cape Town	2 days	Returned after 17 years	Reunited with her biological family after her younger, near identical sister started at the same school. Most of her friends joked that they were sisters.
17 November 1999	Walter da Silva	Unknown	Johannesburg	57	Released after 3 hours	Da Silva was kidnapped by two men and was forced to make a phone call to his assistants ahead of a game against Bush Bucks, asking them to leave the stadium. The kidnappers also stole ZAR1, 500 rands.
2004	Benedict Cumberbatch, Denise Black, Unnamed South African	Unknown	Santa Lucia, KwaZulu-Natal	28, 46, unknown	Released after a few hours	When returning from a scuba diving trip, the vehicle they were traveling in had a blow out. While fitting the spare, they were accosted by 6 armed men. They were bound up and driven around for a while. After a discussion with Cumberbatch about a fear of small places, and an argument among themselves, the kidnappers released all three.
9 July 2004	Leigh Matthews	Donovan Moodley	Morningside, Johannesburg	21	Murdered	Donovan Moodley claimed that he intended to release Leigh Mathews after the ransom was paid, however panicked and felt that he needed to kill her.
31 December 2009	Masego Kgomo	Brian Mangwale	Soshanguve, Gauteng	10	Murdered	Kgomo was kidnapped for a Muti killing by Brian Mangwala. It is believed that she may have been gang raped before been taken to the sangoma.
12 November 2010	Anni Dewani, Shrien Dewani	Zola Robert Tongo, Mziwamadoda Qwabe, Xolile Mngeni	Gugulethu, Cape Town	28, 31	Murdered, released	During a night trip through the Township of Gugulethu, the taxi was hijacked. Husband Shrien was dropped off in neighbouring township of Khayelitsha while Anni was kept. The vehicle was found the next day with the lifeless body of Anni Dewani in the back seat. Shrien was suspected of having masterminded the kidnapping and murder of his wife. At the conclusion of Shrien Dewani's trial in December 2014, he was exonerated, the Western Cape High Court ruling that there was no credible evidence to support the allegations against him, nor to support the allegation that the crime was a premeditated murder for hire.
3 December 2016	Caroline Ethan, Ryan Ethan	Unknown	Morningside, Johannesburg	6,10	Still Not Found	Ryan and Caroline Ethan were kidnapped on their way to the airport, they are still not yet found and also the kidnapper demanded a ransom.
4 April 2019	Amahle Thabethe	Unknown	Tsakane, Ekurhuleni	8	Still Not Found	She was lured away from playing with her friends one day, and her friends described the man to police, only for them to make excuses.
