= Ukuthwalwa =

South African term for bride kidnapping

Ukuthwala is the South African term for bride kidnapping, the practice of a man abducting a young girl and forcing her into marriage, often without the consent of her parents. These "marriages by capture" occur mainly in rural parts of South Africa, in particular the Eastern Cape and KwaZulu-Natal. The Basotho call it tjhobediso. Among the Xhosa and Zulu people, ukuthwala was once an acceptable way for two young people in love to get married when their families opposed the match (and so actually a form of elopement). Ukuthwala has been abused, however, "to victimize isolated rural women and enrich male relatives."

== Context ==
Bride kidnapping, also known as marriage by abduction or marriage by capture, is not restricted to South Africa. The practice of a man abducting the woman he wishes to marry has existed around the world and throughout prehistory and history. It still occurs in various parts of the world, especially in the Caucasus and Central Asia.

In most nations, bride kidnapping is considered a sex crime because of the implied element of rape, rather than a valid form of marriage. Some types of it may also be seen as falling along the continuum between forced marriage and arranged marriage. The term is sometimes confused with elopements, in which a couple runs away together and seeks the consent of their parents later. In some cases, the woman cooperates with or accedes to the kidnapping, typically in an effort to save face for herself or her parents. In many jurisdictions, this used to be encouraged by so-called marry-your-rapist laws. Even in countries where the practice is against the law, if judicial enforcement is weak, customary law ("traditional practices") may prevail.

Bride kidnapping is often (but not always) a form of child marriage. It may be connected to the practice of bride price, wealth paid by the groom and his family to the bride's parents, and the inability or unwillingness to pay it.

Bride kidnapping is distinguished from raptio in that the former refers to the abduction of one woman by one man (and his friends and relatives), and is still a widespread practice, whereas the latter refers to the large scale abduction of women by groups of men, possibly in a time of war. The classic example from Roman mythology or history was the Rape of the Sabine women. Raptio was assumed to be a historical practice, hence the Latin term, but the 21st century has seen a resurgence of war rape, some of which has elements of bride kidnapping; for example, women and girls abducted by Boko Haram in Nigeria, the Lord Resistance Army in Uganda and ISIS in the Middle East have been taken as wives by their abductors.

== Origins ==
In South Africa, the custom originated from the Xhosa people, though the practice has expanded into different ethnic groups. The act of ukuthwala traditionally required the culprit to pay one or more head of cattle to the father or legal guardian of the girl. Unsuspecting girls who had not consented to ukuthwala usually did not object to its purpose. Sometimes the girl genuinely did not wish to be married, although usually girls were conditioned from childhood to look forward to the day, and to believe that marriage and childbearing are the fulfilment of life. A modern interpretation of this practice encourages men to abduct young girls (commonly under 18) for the purpose of marriage.

== Prevalence ==
Many of the abductees are reported to be under-aged girls, including some as young as eight. The practice received negative publicity, with media reporting in 2009 that more than 20 Eastern Cape girls are forced to drop out of school every month because of ukuthwala.

In Lusikisiki in 2009, there were instances of young girls from orphanages, being forced into marriages to older men. There have been instances of young girls being forced into illegal marriages to old widowed men (about 55 to 70 years).

The practice of ukuthwalwa has been apologised as a mock abduction or an irregular proposal intended to achieve a traditional law marriage.(Bennett Customary Law in South Africa -2004)

Even though the laws are not stringent enough to curb such a custom, The Parliament of The Republic of South Africa is focusing on preventive measures to empower women to report cases of exploitation and mobilizing community action for such incidents.

== See also ==
- Rape in South Africa
- Kidnapping in South Africa
