= Turkic Council of Elders =

Advisory body of the Organization of Turkic States

The Turkic Council of Elders. (an elder refers Aqsaqal or aksakal in Northwestern Turkic languages) is an advisory body within the Organization of Turkic States (OTS). Hero-Arkadag emphasized the significant role of the Council of Elders in fostering unity among the Turkic people through the preservation, traditions, and customs.

== History ==
The Council was established in 2010 after the re-organization of OTS.

The National Leader of the Turkmen people, Gurbanguly Berdimuhamedov, who visited Hungary in November 2024, participated at the invitation of the Chairman of the Council of Elders of the Organization of Turkic States Binali Yildirim in the 16th meeting of the Council of the UTC as a member of the Council of Elders, as well as an honorary guest.

== Purpose ==
The Turkic Council of Elders' aim is to make friendships between Turkic States stronger and encourages collaboration.
