= Bride kidnapping =

Abduction of a woman or girl for marriage

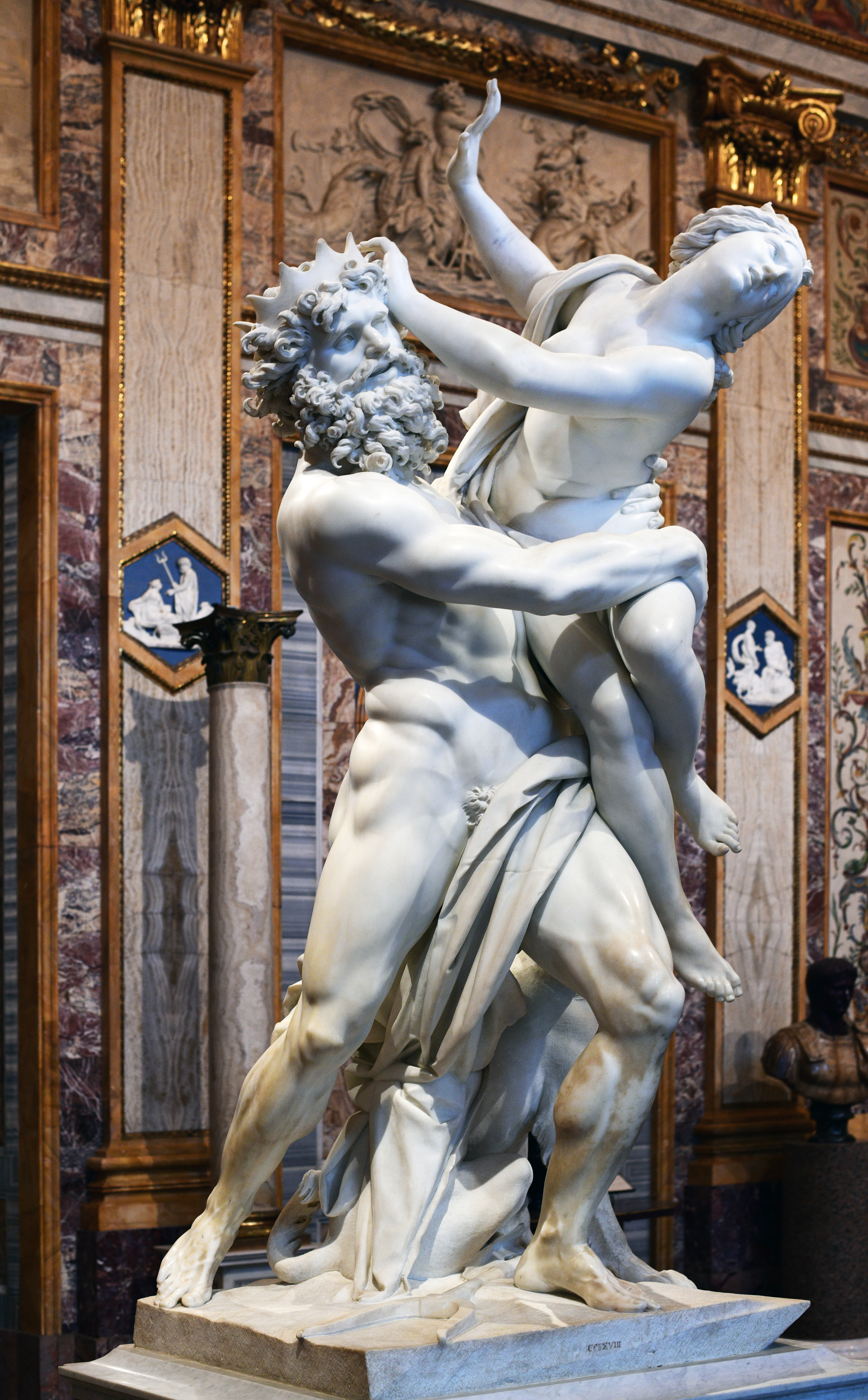
The Rape of Proserpina by Gianlorenzo Bernini (1622) depicts an episode in Greco-Roman mythology where Proserpina/Persephone is abducted and married to Dis/Hades.

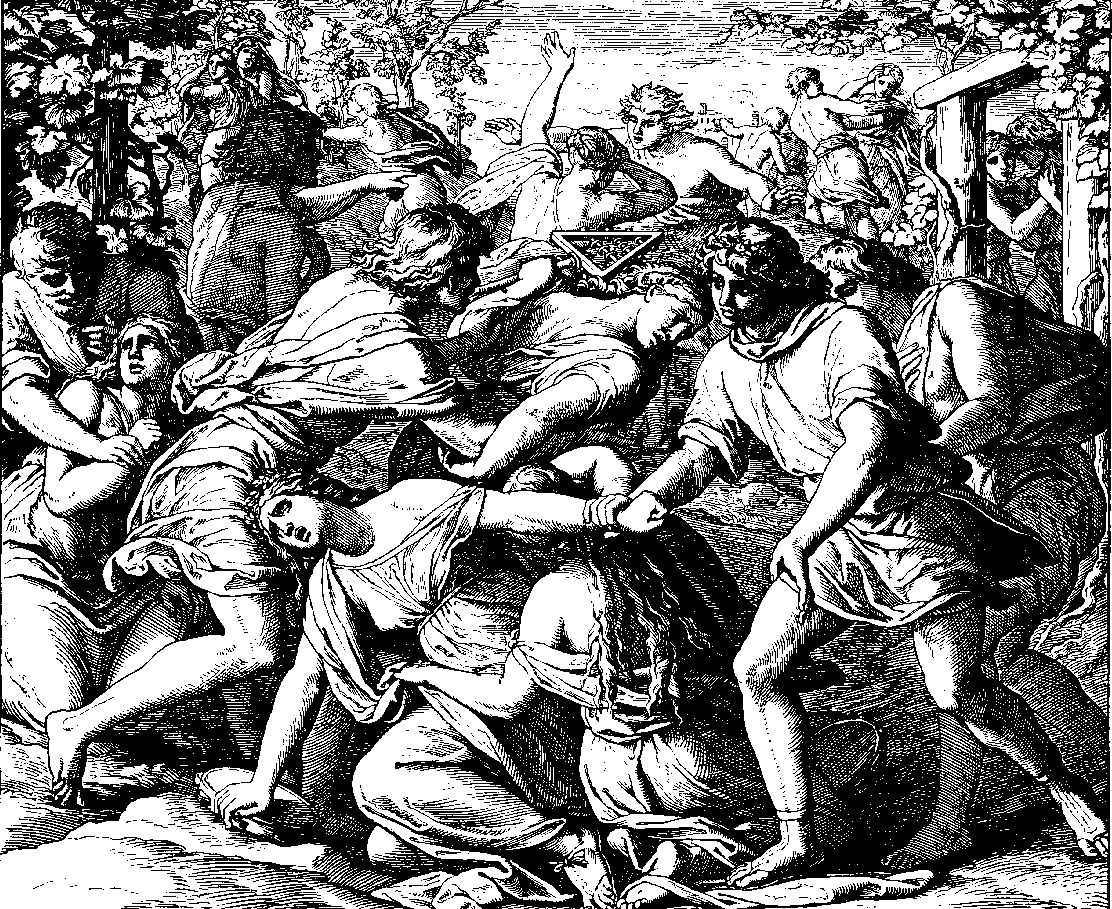
Benjaminites seize wives from Shiloh in this 1860 woodcut by Julius Schnorr von Karolsfeld. There were not enough women available for marriage after the high losses in the Battle at Gibeah.

Bride kidnapping, also known as marriage by abduction or marriage by capture, is a practice in which a man abducts the woman or girl he wishes to marry.

Bride kidnapping (hence the portmanteau bridenapping) has been practiced around the world and throughout prehistory and history, among peoples as diverse as the Hmong in Southeast Asia, the Tzeltal in Mexico, and the Romani in Europe. Bride kidnapping still occurs in various parts of the world, but it is most common in the Caucasus, Central Asia, the Amazon rainforest, and some parts of Africa.

In most nations, bride kidnapping is considered a sex crime because of the implied element of rape, rather than a valid form of marriage. Some types of it may also be seen as falling along the continuum between forced marriage and arranged marriage. The term is sometimes confused with elopements, in which a couple runs away together and seeks the consent of their parents later. In some cases, the woman cooperates with or accedes to the kidnapping, typically in an effort to save face for herself or her parents. In many jurisdictions, this used to be encouraged by so-called marry-your-rapist laws. Even in countries where the practice is against the law, if judicial enforcement is weak, customary law ("traditional practices") may prevail.

Bride kidnapping is often (but not always) a form of child marriage. It may be connected to the practice of bride price, wealth paid by the groom and his family to the bride's parents, and the inability or unwillingness to pay it.

Bride kidnapping is distinguished from raptio in that the former refers to the abduction of one woman or girl by one man (and his friends and relatives), and is still a widespread practice, whereas the latter refers to the large scale abduction of women by groups of men, possibly in a time of war. Raptio was assumed to be a historical practice, hence the Latin term, but the 21st century has seen a resurgence of war rape, some of which has elements of bride kidnapping; for example, women and girls abducted by Boko Haram in Nigeria, the Lord's Resistance Army in Uganda and ISIS in the Middle East have been taken as wives by their abductors.

Rituals indicating a symbolic bride kidnapping still exist in some cultures (such as Circassians), as part of traditions surrounding a wedding. According to some sources, the honeymoon is a relic of marriage by capture, based on the practice of the husband going into hiding with his wife to avoid reprisals from her relatives, with the intention that the woman or girl would be pregnant by the end of the month.

== Background and rationale ==
Though the motivations behind bride kidnapping vary by region, the cultures with traditions of marriage by abduction are generally patriarchal with a strong social stigma on sex or pregnancy outside marriage and illegitimate births. In some modern cases, the couple colluded to elope under the guise of a bride kidnapping, presenting their parents with a fait accompli. In most cases, however, the men who resort to capturing a wife are often of lower social status, because of poverty, disease, poor character or criminality. They are sometimes deterred from legitimately seeking a wife because of the payment the woman's family expects, the bride price (not to be confused with a dowry, paid by the woman's family).

In agricultural and patriarchal societies, where bride kidnapping is most common, children work for their families. A woman leaves her birth family, geographically and economically, when she marries, becoming instead a member of the groom's family. (See patrilocality for an anthropological explanation.) Due to this loss of labour, the women's families do not want their daughters to marry young, and demand economic compensation (the aforementioned bride price) when they do leave them. This conflicts with the interests of men, who want to marry early, as marriage means an increase in social status, and the interests of the groom's family, who will gain another pair of hands for the family farm, business or home. Depending on the legal system under which she lives, the consent of the woman may not be a factor in judging the validity of the marriage.

In addition to the issue of forced marriage, bride kidnapping may have other negative effects on young women and their society. For example, fear of kidnap is cited as a reason for the lower participation of girls in the education system.

The mechanism of marriage by abduction varies by location. This article surveys the phenomenon by region, drawing on common cultural factors for patterns, but noting country-level distinctions.

== Africa ==
=== Egypt ===
There have been cases of Coptic Christian women and girls abducted, forced to convert to Islam and then married to Muslim men.

=== Ethiopia ===
Bride kidnapping is prevalent in many regions of Ethiopia. According to surveys conducted in 2003 by the National Committee on Traditional Practices in Ethiopia, the custom's prevalence rate was estimated at 69 percent nationally, and highest in the Southern Nations, Nationalities and People's Region at 92 percent. A man working in co-ordination with his friends may kidnap a girl or woman, sometimes using a horse to ease the escape. The abductor will then hide his intended bride or bring her to his family and rape her, sometimes in front of his family, until she becomes pregnant. As the father of the woman's child, the man can claim her as his wife. Subsequently, the kidnapper may try to negotiate a bride price with the village elders to legitimize the marriage. Girls as young as eleven years old are reported to have been kidnapped for the purpose of marriage. Though Ethiopia criminalised such abductions and raised the marriageable age to 18 in 2004, the law has not been well implemented. A 2016 UNICEF evidence review (based on data from 2010 and 2013) estimated that 10 to 13 percent of marriages in the highest risk areas involved abduction, with rates of 1.4 percent to 2.4 percent in lower risk areas of the country.

The bride of the forced marriage may suffer from the psychological and physical consequences of forced sexual activity and early pregnancy and the early end to her education. Women and girls who are kidnapped may also be exposed to sexually transmitted diseases such as HIV/AIDS.

=== Kenya ===
Forced marriages continue to be a problem for young girls in Kenya. The United States Department of State reports that children and young teenaged girls (aged ten and up) are sometimes married to men two decades older.

Marriage by abduction used to be, and to some extent still is, a customary practice for the Kisii ethnic group. In their practice, the abductor kidnaps the woman forcibly and rapes her in an attempt to impregnate her. The "bride" is then coerced through the stigma of pregnancy and rape to marry her abductor. Though most common in the late 19th century through the 1960s, such marriage abductions still occur occasionally.

The Turkana tribe also practised marriage by abduction. In this culture, bridal kidnapping (akomari) occurred before any formal attempts to arrange a marriage with a bride's family. According to one scholar, a successful bridal kidnapping raised the abductor's reputation in his community, and allowed him to negotiate a lower bride price with his wife's family. Should an attempted abductor fail to seize his bride, he was bound to pay a bride price to the woman's family, provide additional gifts and payments to the family, and to have an arranged marriage (akota).

=== Rwanda ===
Bride-kidnapping is prevalent in areas of Rwanda. Often the abductor kidnaps the woman from her household or follows her outside and abducts her. He and his companions may then rape the woman to ensure that she submits to the marriage. The family of the woman either then feels obliged to consent to the union, or is forced to when the kidnapper impregnates her, as pregnant women are not seen as eligible for marriage. The marriage is confirmed with a ceremony that follows the abduction by several days. In such ceremonies, the abductor asks his bride's parents to forgive him for abducting their daughter. The man may offer a cow, money, or other goods as restitution to his bride's family.

Bride-kidnap marriages in Rwanda often lead to poor outcomes. Human rights workers report that one third of men who abduct their wives abandon them, leaving the wife without support and impaired in finding a future marriage. Additionally, with the growing frequency of bride-kidnapping, some men choose not to solemnize their marriage at all, keeping their "bride" as a concubine.

Bride kidnapping is not specifically outlawed in Rwanda, though violent abductions are punishable as rape. According to a criminal justice official, bride kidnappers are virtually never tried in court: "When we hear about abduction, we hunt down the kidnappers and arrest them and sometimes the husband, too. But we're forced to let them all go several days later," says an official at the criminal investigation department in Nyagatare, the capital of Umutara. Women's rights groups have attempted to reverse the tradition by conducting awareness raising campaigns and by promoting gender equity, but the progress has been limited so far.

=== South Africa ===
The practice is known as ukuthwalwa or simply thwala in the Nguni-speaking tribes. (The Basotho call it tjhobediso.) Among Zulu people, thwala was once an acceptable way for two young people in love to get married when their families opposed the match, and so it was actually a form of elopement. Thwala has been abused, however, "to victimize isolated rural women and enrich male relatives."

== Central Asia ==
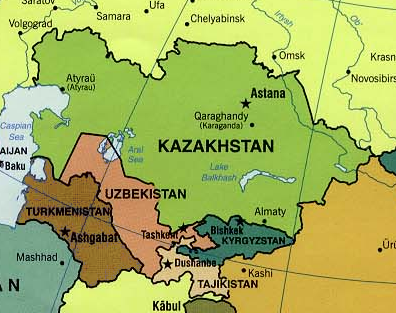
Map of Central Asia

In Central Asia, bride kidnapping exists in Kyrgyzstan, Kazakhstan, Turkmenistan, and Karakalpakstan, an autonomous region of Uzbekistan. Though origin of the tradition in the region is disputed, the rate of nonconsensual bride kidnappings appears to be increasing in several countries throughout Central Asia as the political and economic climate changes.

=== Kyrgyzstan ===
Despite its illegality, with the practice being subjected to stricter crackdowns in 2013, which punish it by a prison sentences of up to 10 years, in many primarily rural areas, bride kidnapping, known as ala kachuu (to take and flee), is an accepted and common way of taking a wife. The matter is somewhat confused by the local use of the term "bride kidnap" to reflect practices along a continuum, from forcible abduction and rape (and then, almost unavoidably, marriage), to something akin to an elopement arranged between the two young people, to which both sets of parents have to consent after the act. Bride kidnappings that involve rape do so to psychologically force the would-be bride to accept her kidnapper and his family's pressure to marry him, since if she then refuses she would never be considered marriageable again. Of 12,000 yearly bride kidnappings, approximately 2,000 women reported that they had been raped by the would-be groom. However, the United Nations Development Programme disputes that bride kidnapping is part of the country's culture or tradition, and considers it a human rights violation.

Estimates of the prevalence of bride kidnapping vary, sometimes widely. A 2015 crime victimization survey included the kidnapping of young women for marriage. Fourteen percent of married women answered that they had been kidnapped; two-thirds of these cases had been consensual, in that the woman knew the man and had agreed with it up front. This means that about five percent of extant marriages are cases of Ala Kachuu. A 2007 study published in the Central Asian Survey concluded that approximately half of all Kyrgyz marriages included bride kidnapping; of those kidnappings, two-thirds are non-consensual. Research by non-governmental organizations give estimates from a low of 40% to between 68 and 75 percent.

Although the practice is illegal, bride kidnappers are rarely prosecuted. This reluctance to enforce the code is in part caused by the pluralistic legal system, where many villages are de facto ruled by councils of elders and aqsaqal courts following customary law, away from the eyes of the state legal system. Aqsaqal courts, tasked with adjudicating family law, property and torts, often fail to take bride kidnapping seriously. In many cases, aqsaqal members are invited to the kidnapped bride's wedding and encourage the family of the bride to accept the marriage.

=== Kazakhstan ===
In Kazakhstan, bride kidnapping (alyp qashu) is divided into non-consensual and consensual abductions, kelisimsiz alyp qaşu ("to take and run without agreement") and kelissimmen alyp qaşu ("to take and run with agreement"), respectively. Though some kidnappers are motivated by the wish to avoid a bride price or the expense of hosting wedding celebrations or a feast to celebrate the girl leaving home, other would-be husbands fear the woman's refusal, or that the woman will be kidnapped by another suitor first. Generally, in nonconsensual kidnappings, the abductor uses either deception (such as offering a ride home) or force (such as grabbing the woman, or using a sack to restrain her) to coerce the woman to come with him. Once at the man's house, one of his female relatives offers the woman a kerchief (oramal) that signals the bride's consent to the marriage. Though in consensual kidnappings, the woman may agree with little hesitation to wear the kerchief, in non-consensual abductions, the woman may resist the kerchief for days. Next, the abductor's family generally asks the "bride" to write a letter to her family, explaining that she had been taken of her own free will. As with the kerchief, the woman may resist this step adamantly. Subsequently, the "groom" and his family generally issues an official apology to the bride's family, including a letter and a delegation from the groom's household. At this time, the groom's family may present a small sum to replace the bride-price. Though some apology delegations are met cordially, others are greeted with anger and violence. Following the apology delegation, the bride's family may send a delegation of "pursuers" (qughysnshy) either to retrieve the bride or to verify her condition and honour the marriage.

A recent victimization survey in Kazakhstan (2018) included the crime of kidnapping of young women for marriage. 4% of married women answered that they were kidnapped at the time and that two-thirds of these cases were consensual, the woman knew the man and had agreed with it up front. This means that about 1-1.5% of current marriages in Kazakhstan are the result of non-consensual abductions.

Under the common law of Kazakhs, it was possible to kidnap a woman with her consent, especially when the man's family was too poor to pay a dowry. According to the Criminal Code of Kazakhstan, kidnapping can be sentenced to 10 to 15 years imprisonment. However, if the kidnapper voluntarily surrenders the abductee, he is released from criminal liability.

A kidnapped woman, even if she escapes, is stigmatized in her village. In the Islamic tradition, according to which a girl must keep her virginity until marriage, she cannot spend the night at another man's house if he is not her father or brother, which would put her virginity in doubt. Thus, her only social option is to escape the kidnapper's house before dark or agree to marry.

=== Uzbekistan ===
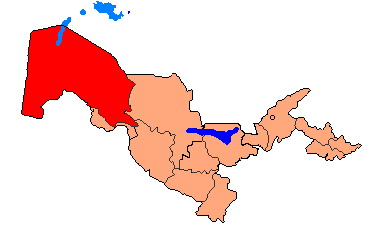
Map of Uzbekistan. Karakalpakstan in red.

In Karakalpakstan, an autonomous region in Uzbekistan, nearly one fifth of all marriages are conducted by bride kidnapping. Activist groups in the region tie an increase in kidnappings to economic instability. Whereas weddings can be prohibitively expensive, kidnappings avoid both the cost of the ceremony and any bride price. Other scholars report that less desirable males with lower education level or suffering from drug abuse or alcoholism are more likely to kidnap their brides. Bride kidnapping sometimes originates out of a dating relationship and, at other times, happens as an abduction by multiple people.

== South Asia ==
=== Pakistan ===
As of 2026, abductions, followed by forced conversion and forced marriage are still being reported in Pakistan. United Nations human rights experts described continued and widespread patterns of abduction and forced religious conversion through marriage. According to the experts, in 2025 about 75% of women and girls affected by forced conversion through marriage were Hindu and 25% were Christian, while almost 80% of incidents occurred in the province of Sindh. Girls between the ages of 14 and 18 were particularly targeted, although some victims were younger.

The experts also reported that law-enforcement authorities sometimes dismiss complaints from victims' families, fail to investigate or prosecute cases promptly, or fail to properly assess the age of victims.

Individual cases have also received international attention. In 2020, 14-year-old Christian girl Maira Shahbaz was abducted in Faisalabad and forced to convert to Islam and marry one of her abductors; she later escaped and went into hiding. In another case reported by the BBC, a 12-year-old Christian girl identified as Farah was abducted from her home in Punjab in 2020 and said that she was shackled, forced to convert to Islam and forced to marry her abductor.

== East and Southeast Asia ==
=== Indonesia ===
In Bali tradition, Ngerorod is the tradition of abducting women for marrying when the caste of the man is lower than the woman. The Balinese caste order –from higher to lower – is: 1. Brahmanas (priests) 2. Satrias (warriors) 3. Wesias (merchants) 4. Sudras (labourers). The process from 'kidnapping' to marriage ritual is usually done in 3 steps (usually completed in 3 days):

1. Kidnapping the woman
2. Sending a messenger to inform the woman's family
3. The marriage

After the marriage, the woman will change or remove her name prefix which reflects her caste before the marriage. In modern days, this practice is still going on with more permissive manner, such as the woman's parents knowing in advance when the kidnapping will happen, when the messenger will come, and when and where the marriage will take place.

This tradition is also practiced by Balinese not living in Bali: Balinese living in Lombok island, Balinese living in Lampung, etc.

In Lombok, the Sasak people have a marriage tradition called merariq, which is a marriage tradition involving 'elopement'. In this tradition, a man will kidnap or carry away a girl to be his wife before performing the wedding ritual.

=== Hmong culture ===
Marriage by abduction also occurs in traditional Hmong culture, in which it is known as zij poj niam. As in some other cultures, bride kidnapping is generally a joint effort between the would-be groom and his friends and family. Generally, the abductor takes the woman while she is alone. The abductor then sends a message to the kidnap victim's family, informing them of the abduction and the abductor's intent to marry their daughter. If the victim's family manage to find the woman and insist on her return, they might be able to free her from the obligation to marry the man. However, if they fail to find the woman, the kidnap victim is forced to marry the man. The abductor still has to pay a bride price for the woman, generally an increased amount because of the kidnapping. Because of this increased cost (and the general unpleasantness of abduction), kidnapping is usually only a practice reserved for a man with an otherwise blemished chance of securing a bride, because of criminal background, illness or poverty.

Occasionally, members of the Hmong ethnic group have engaged in bride kidnapping in the United States. In some cases, the defendant has been allowed to plead a cultural defense to justify his abduction. This defense has sometimes been successful. In 1985, Kong Moua, a Hmong man, kidnapped and raped a woman from a Californian college. He later claimed that this was an act of zij poj niam and was allowed to plead to false imprisonment only, instead of kidnapping and rape. The judge in this case considered cultural testimony as an explanation of the man's crime.

=== China ===
Until the 1940s, marriage by abduction, known as qiangqin (Chinese: 搶親; pinyin: qiǎngqīn), occurred in rural areas of China. Though illegal in imperial China, for rural areas it often became a local "institution". According to one scholar, marriage by abduction was sometimes a groom's answer to avoid paying a bride price. In other cases, the scholar argues, it was a collusive act between the bride's parents and the groom to circumvent the bride's consent.

Chinese scholars theorise that this practice of marriage by abduction became the inspiration for a form of institutionalised public expression for women: the bridal lament. In imperial China, a new bride performed a two- to three-day public song, including chanting and sobbing, that listed her woes and complaints. The bridal lament would be witnessed by members of her family and the local community.

In recent years bride kidnapping has resurfaced in areas of China. In many cases, the women are kidnapped and sold to men in poorer regions of China, or as far abroad as Mongolia. Reports say that buying a kidnapped bride is nearly one tenth of the price of hosting a traditional wedding. The United States Department of State tie this trend of abducting brides to China's one-child policy, and the consequent gender imbalance as more male children are born than female children.

=== Tibet ===
Bride abduction also occurred in Tibetan history, sometimes involving ceremonial mock abductions or as a bargaining procedure.

=== Japan ===
According to a study conducted by Kunio Yanagita, a scholar of Folklore in Japan, three patterns of bride kidnapping are known to have existed in Japan:

- A man and his cooperators kidnap a woman without notifying her parents;
- Bride kidnapping that may occur after parents forbid marriage out of fear for their daughter's social reputation;
- Bride kidnapping as an alternative path to marriage for couples unable to pay for a typical wedding.

In Buraku of Kochi, there was the custom of bride kidnapping named katagu (かたぐ).

== Americas ==
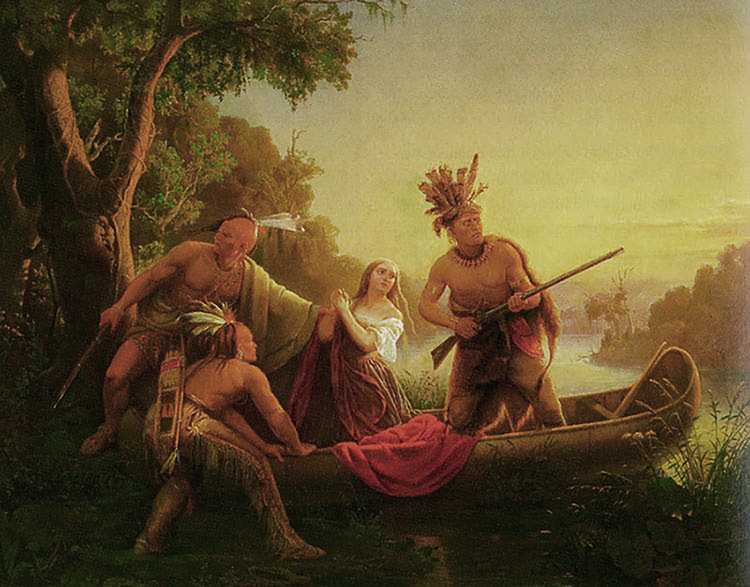
Abduction of an American woman by Shawnee warriors in 1776

The practice of kidnapping children, teenagers and women from neighbouring tribes and adopting them into the new tribe was common among Indigenous peoples of the Americas. The kidnappings were a way of introducing new blood into the group. Captured European women sometimes settled down as adopted members of the tribe and at least one woman, Mary Jemison, refused rescue when it was offered.

=== Brazil ===
The trope of the captured Indigenous (great, great) grandmother is a standard origin myth for many white Brazilian families, captured in the widely use phrase "my (great, great) grandmother was an Indian caught in the rope" (the phrase Índia pega no laço). The phrase reflect "in part" the facts of centuries of female abductions by colonialists that continued even into the 20th century. For example, in a paper discussing the phrase, Indigenous academic Mirna P Marinho da Silva Anaquiri reports a quote from a teacher in Goiânia interviewed as part of her fieldwork:

As a child I witnessed an Indian woman arriving at the farm where my father worked, tied to the tail of a horse. The guy riding on the horse, and her, tied with a rope to the horse's tail; this - for me - is that image. And this "pega no laço" [caught in the lasso] is so generalized that it seems common, natural - nobody is shocked.... ..They... locked her in this wooden box.. ..This happened in 1961, I was four years old.

— A teacher in Goianápolis, reported in Anaquiri, 2018

Helena Valero, a Brazilian woman kidnapped by Amazonian Indians in 1937, dictated her story to an Italian anthropologist, who published it in 1965.

=== United States ===
Cases exist within some Mormon fundamentalist communities around the Utah-Arizona border; however, accurate information is difficult to obtain from these closed communities. Most of these cases are usually referred to as forced marriages, although they are similar to other bride kidnappings around the world.

=== Mexico ===
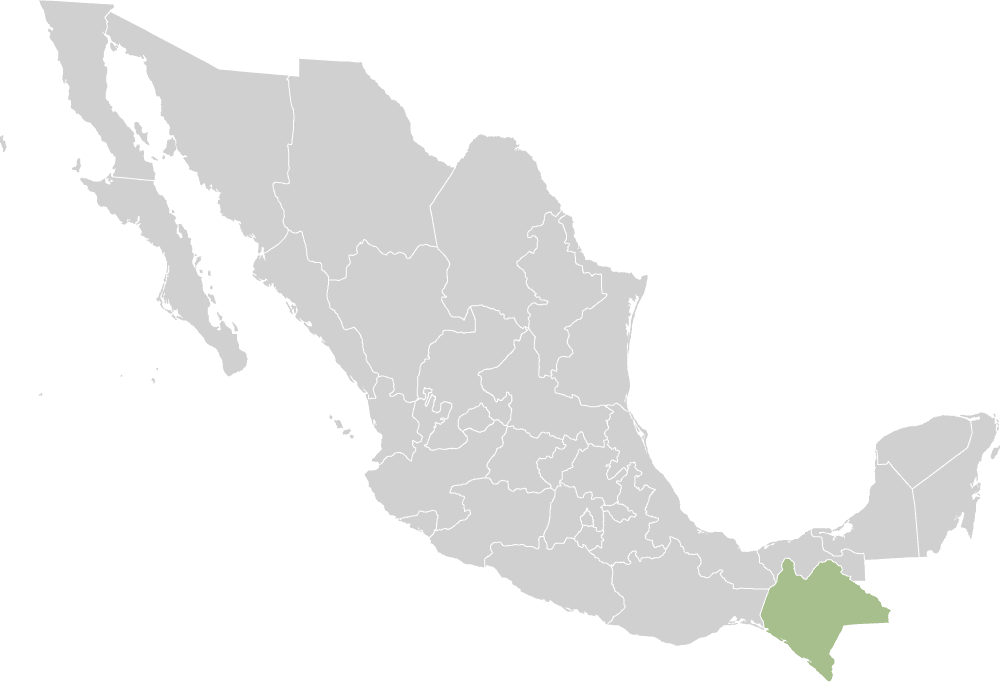
Map of Chiapas, Mexico

Among the Tzeltal community, a Mayan tribe in Chiapas, Mexico, bride kidnapping has been a recurring method of securing a wife. The Tzeltal people are an Indigenous, agricultural tribe that is organised patriarchally. Premarital contact between the sexes is discouraged; unmarried women are supposed to avoid speaking with men outside their families. As with other societies, the grooms that engage in bride kidnapping have generally been the less socially desirable mates.

In the Tzeltal tradition, a girl is kidnapped by the groom, possibly in concert with his friends. She is generally taken to the mountains and raped. The abductor and his future bride often then stay with a relative until the bride's father's anger is reported to have subsided. At that point, the abductor will return to the bride's house to negotiate a bride-price, bringing with him the bride and traditional gifts such as rum.

The largest Comanche raids into Mexico took place from 1840 to the mid-1850s, when they declined in size and intensity. The captured Mexican girls often became one of several wives of Comanche men.

=== Chile ===
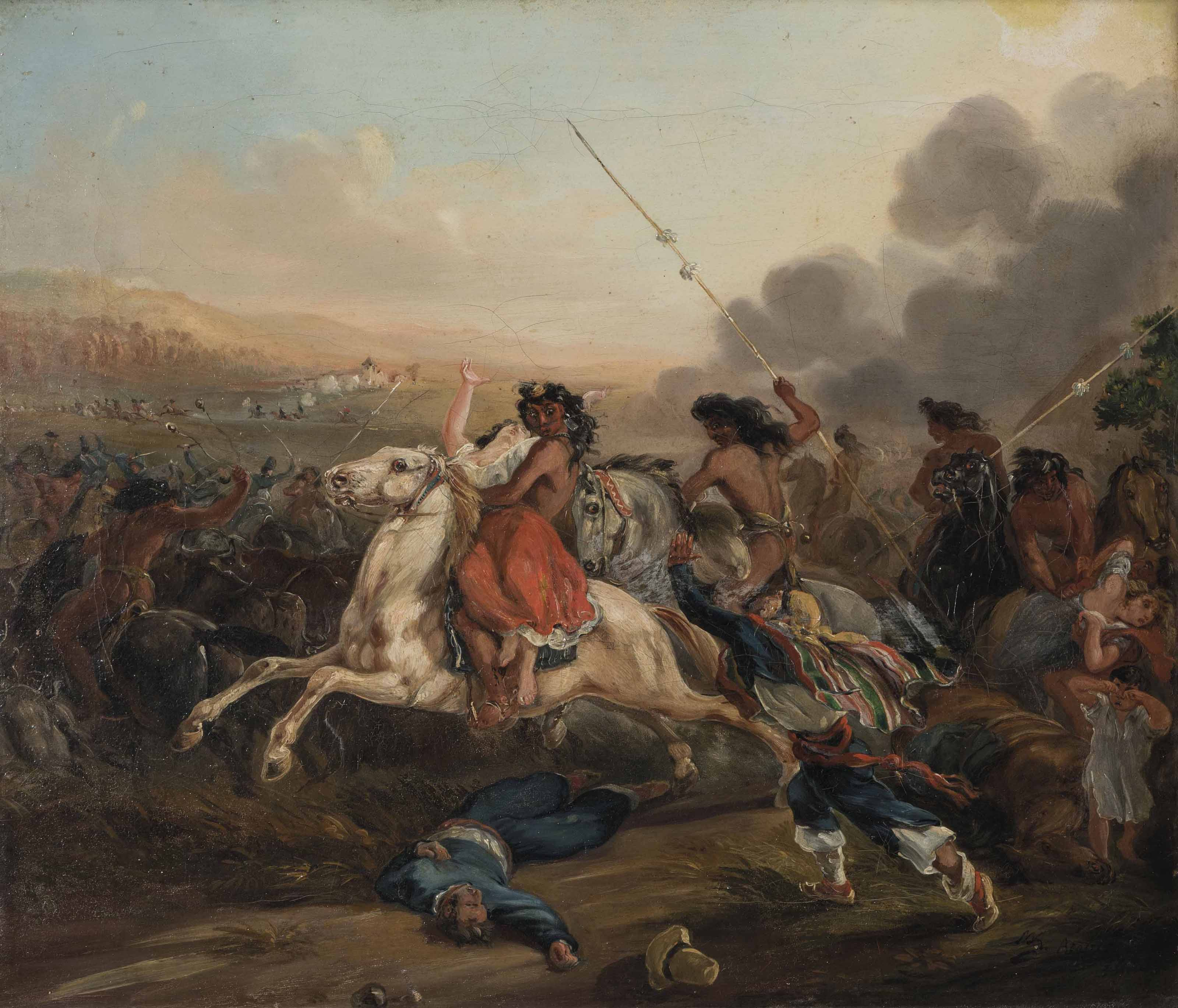
The painting depicts a Chilean woman being kidnapped during a malón.

Among the Mapuche of Chile, the practice was known as casamiento por capto in Spanish, and ngapitun in Mapudungun. Contemporary chronicler Alonso González de Nájera writes that during the Destruction of the Seven Cities in southern Chile Mapuches took over 500 Spanish women as captives. In the case of the women it was, in the words of González de Nájera, "to exploit them". The capture of women initiated a tradition of abductions of Spanish women in the 17th century by Mapuches.

== Caucasus ==
Ethno-linguistic groups in the Caucasus region

Bride kidnapping is an increasing trend in the countries and regions of the Caucasus, both in Georgia in the South and in Dagestan, Chechnya and Ingushetia in the North. In the Caucasian versions of bride-kidnapping, the kidnap victim's family may play a role in attempting to convince the woman to stay with her abductor after the kidnapping, because of the shame inherent in the presumed consummation of the marriage.

=== Dagestan, Chechnya and Ingushetia ===
The Dagestan, Chechnya and Ingushetia regions in the Northern Caucasus (in Russia) have also witnessed an increase in bride kidnappings since the fall of the Soviet Union. As in other countries, kidnappers sometimes seize acquaintances to be brides and other times abduct strangers. The social stigma of spending a night in a male's house can be a sufficient motivation to force a young woman to marry her captor. Under Russian law, though a kidnapper who refuses to release his bride could be sentenced to eight to ten years, a kidnapper will not be prosecuted if he releases the victim or marries her with her consent. Bride captors in Chechnya are liable, in theory, to receive also a fine of up to 1 million rubles. As in the other regions, authorities often fail to respond to the kidnappings. In Chechnya, the police failure to respond to bridal kidnappings is compounded by a prevalence of abductions in the region. Several such kidnappings have been captured on video.

Researchers and non-profit organisations describe a rise in bride kidnappings in the North Caucasus in the latter half of the 20th century. In Chechnya, women's rights organisations tie the increase in kidnappings to a deterioration of women's rights under the rule of Chechen president Ramzan Kadyrov.

=== Azerbaijan ===
In Azerbaijan, both marriage by capture (qız qaçırmaq) and elopement (qoşulub qaçmaq) are relatively common practices. In the Azeri kidnap custom, a young woman is taken to the home of the abductor's parents through either deceit or force. Regardless of whether rape occurs or not, the woman is generally regarded as impure by her relatives, and is therefore forced to marry her abductor. Despite a 2005 Azeri law that criminalised bride kidnapping, the practice places women in extremely vulnerable social circumstances, in a country where spousal abuse is rampant and recourse to law enforcement for domestic matters is impossible. In Azerbaijan, women abducted by bride kidnapping sometimes become slaves of the family who kidnap them.

=== Georgia ===
In Georgia, bride kidnapping occurs in the south of the country mostly concentrated in and around the town of Akhalkalaki ethnic minority areas. Although the extent of the problem is not known, non-governmental activists estimate that hundreds of women are kidnapped and forced to marry each year. While on the decline in Georgia, in 2020 it was estimated that as many as 3,000 to 5,000 women and girls are kidnapped as brides annually. In a typical Georgian model of bride kidnapping, the abductor, often accompanied by friends, accosts the intended bride, and coerces her through deception or force to enter a car. Once in the car, the victim may be taken to a remote area or the captor's home. These kidnappings sometimes include rape, and may result in strong stigma to the female victim, who is assumed to have engaged in sexual relations with her captor. Women who have been victims of bride kidnapping are often regarded with shame; the victim's relatives may view it as a disgrace if the woman returns home after a kidnapping. In other cases, the kidnapping is a consensual elopement. Human Rights Watch reports that prosecutors often refuse to bring charges against the kidnappers, urging the kidnap victim to reconcile with her aggressor. Enforcing the appropriate laws in this regard may also be a problem because the kidnapping cases often go unreported as a result of intimidation of victims and their families.

== Europe ==
=== Roma (Romani) communities ===
Bride kidnapping has been documented as a marital practice in some Romani community traditions. In the Romani culture, girls as young as twelve years old may be kidnapped for marriage to teenaged boys. As the Roma population lives throughout Europe, this practice has been seen on multiple occasions in Ireland, England, the Czech Republic, the Netherlands, Bulgaria and Slovakia. The kidnapping has been theorized as a way to avoid a bride price or as a method of ensuring exogamy. The tradition's normalization of kidnapping puts young women and girls at higher risk of becoming victims of human trafficking.

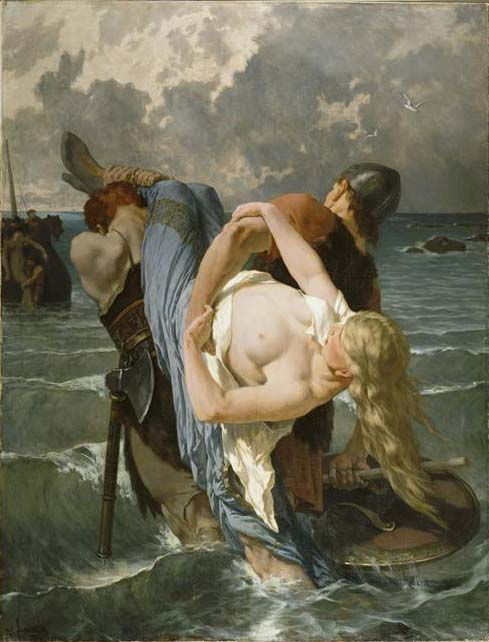
A depiction of Vikings kidnapping a woman. Viking men would often kidnap foreign women for marriage or concubinage from lands that they had pillaged. Illustrated by French painter Évariste Vital Luminais in the 19th century.

=== Mediterranean ===
Marriage by capture was practiced in ancient cultures throughout the Mediterranean area. It is represented in mythology and history by the tribe of Benjamin in the Bible; by the Greek hero Paris stealing the beautiful Helen of Troy from her husband Menelaus, thus triggering the Trojan War; and by the rape of the Sabine women by Romulus, the founder of Rome.

In 326 A.D., the Emperor Constantine issued an edict prohibiting marriage by abduction. The law made kidnapping a public offence; even the kidnapped woman or girl could be punished if she later consented to a marriage with her abductor. Spurned suitors sometimes kidnapped their intended brides as a method of restoring honor. The suitor, in coordination with his friends, generally abducted the victim while she was out of her house in the course of her daily chores. The victim would then be secreted outside the town or village. Though the kidnapped woman or girl was sometimes raped in the course of the abduction, the stain on her honor from a presumptive consummation of the marriage was sufficient to damage her marital prospects irreversibly. Sometimes, the abduction masked an elopement.

=== Great Britain ===
Abduction and forced marriage were ancient customs in the Scottish Highlands. Robert Louis Stevenson's 1893 sequel to the better-known Kidnapped, usually entitled Catriona but also published as David Balfour, fictionalises the bride kidnapping of heiress Jean Key by Robert Campbell (aka Robert MacGregor), youngest son of the folk hero Rob Roy. Sir Walter Scott devotes the latter half of the 1829 introduction to his novel Rob Roy to describing the real incident, which took place in 1750 near the village of Balfron. American literary scholar Barry Menikoff places the story in context, and states that "the trials of James and Robert Macgregor were cited regularly as illustrations and precedents in Scottish criminal law".

An earlier and equally notorious example of bride kidnapping was that of Simon Fraser, 11th Lord Lovat, who in October 1697 attempted to marry as his child-bride the daughter of the late Hugh Fraser, 9th Lord Lovat; thwarted in that, he turned his attention to Hugh's

widow, Lady Amelia Murray (1666–1743), daughter of John Murray, 1st Marquess of Atholl. "If he could not have Amelia the daughter, he would have Amelia the mother". Whilst at Castle Dounie he had a minister brought in to marry them. Her family, the most powerful in Scotland, was naturally enraged by this act of violence. He later treated it as a practical joke without legal validity; they separated in December 1697 and he married twice more before Amelia's death on 6 May 1743, without seeking divorce. His rape of Amelia led to a conviction in absentia for treason.

A decade earlier, another notable example spilled from the Scottish Highlands to London, necessitating a private act of Parliament to annul the marriage. Scandal erupted in 1690 when Captain James Campbell (of Burnbank and Boquhan), aided by Sir John, son of Sir William of Johnston (who had served in King William's War and as a captain at the Battle of Boyne), and by Archibald Montgomery, abducted and married a young heiress in London. The teenaged Mary Wharton was heir to her father Philip Wharton of Goldsborough Hall in North Yorkshire, who had died in 1685. On her 13th birthday, Mary had come into an annual income of £1,500, equivalent to £315,000 in 2025.

On 10 November 1690, Mary was lured outside from the home she shared with her great-aunt on Great Queen Street, Westminster, where the three men forced her into a six-horse coach and took her off to the coachman's house. There, she was forcibly married to Campbell, without her consent, and without the presence of her legal guardian Robert Byerley, the son of her great-aunt. By order of the Lord Chief Justice, the marriage was annulled and Mary was returned to her guardian within two days, to whom she was wed two years later. Sir John was then arrested and indicted for the abduction on 11 December, convicted by jury, and hanged at Tyburn on 23 December 1690. Reputedly a "nasty piece of work", Johnston had previously been involved in a similar elopement with a Miss Magrath in County Clare, Ireland and had subsequently been imprisoned in Dublin as a debtor. He was also alleged to have committed rape in Utrecht. However, the real culprit was Campbell, who had lured the impoverished Johnston with money, but escaped scot-free. The marriage was annulled on 20 December 1690 by the Parliament of England, which passed a private act of Parliament: the Mary Wharton and James Campbell Marriage Annulment Act 1690 (2 Will. & Mar. Sess. 2. c. 8 Pr.). Campbell's older brother, the 10th Earl of Argyll and later 1st Duke of Argyll, had unsuccessfully petitioned against the annulment.

=== Italy ===
The custom of fuitina was widespread in Sicily and continental southern Italy. In 1965, this custom was brought to national attention by the case of Franca Viola, a 17-year-old abducted and raped by a local small-time criminal, with the assistance of a dozen of his friends. When she was returned to her family after a week, she refused to marry her abductor, contrary to local expectation. Her family supported her, and suffered severe intimidation for their efforts. The kidnappers were arrested and the main perpetrator was sentenced to 11 years in prison.

The exposure of this "archaic and intransigent system of values and behavioural mores" caused great national debate. In 1968, Franca married her childhood sweetheart, with whom she would later have three children. Conveying clear messages of solidarity, Giuseppe Saragat, then president of Italy, sent the couple a gift on their wedding day, and soon afterwards, Pope Paul VI granted them a private audience. A 1970 film, La moglie più bella (The Most Beautiful Wife) by Damiano Damiani and starring Ornella Muti, is based on the case. Viola never capitalised on her fame and status as a feminist icon, preferring to live a quiet life in Alcamo with her family.

The law allowing "rehabilitating marriages" (also known as marry-your-rapist law) to protect rapists from criminal proceedings was abolished in 1981.

=== Ireland ===
The 12th-century Norman invasion of Ireland was invited by an instance of wife-stealing: in 1167, the King of Leinster, Diarmait Mac Murchada, had his lands and kingship revoked by order of the High King of Ireland, Ruaidrí Ua Conchobair, as punishment for abducting the wife of another king in 1152. This led Diarmait to seek the assistance of King Henry II of England in order to reclaim his kingdom.

In 1797 Henry Browne Hayes kidnapped Mary Pike in County Cork, in an attempted bridal kidnapping. At the subsequent trial Browne was found guilty of kidnapping and sentenced to transportation to New South Wales, Australia.

The abduction of heiresses was an occasional feature in Ireland until 1800, as illustrated in the film The Abduction Club.

=== Malta ===
In 2015, Malta was criticized by Equality Now, for a law which, in certain circumstances, can extinguish the punishment for a man who abducts a woman if, following the abduction, the man and woman get married. (Article 199 and Article 200 of the Criminal Code of Malta) The article was ultimately abolished by Act XIII of 2018, Article 24.

=== Slavic tribes ===
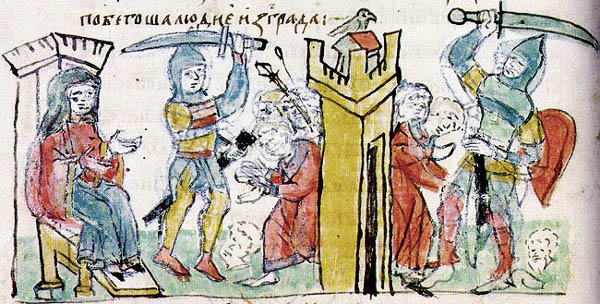
Olga of Kiev attacking a would-be kidnapper's stronghold, miniature from the Radziwiłł Chronicle

East Slavic tribes practiced bride kidnapping in the 11th century. The traditions were documented by the monk Nestor. According to the Primary Chronicle, the Drevlians captured wives non-consensually, whereas the Radimichs, Viatichi, and Severians "captured" their wives after having come to an agreement about marriage with them. The clergy's increase in influence may have helped the custom to abate.

Marriage by capture occurred among the South Slavs until the 1800s in Yugoslavia. Common in Serbia, Montenegro, Croatia and Bosnia-Herzegovina, the custom was known as otmica. The practice was mentioned in the 1605 legal code of the Republic of Poljica. According to Serbian folk-chronicler Vuk Karadzic, a man would dress for "battle" before kidnapping a woman or girl. Physical force was a frequent element of these kidnappings.

Bride kidnapping was also a custom in Bulgaria. With the consent of his parents and the aid of his friends, the abductor would accost his victim and take her to a barn away from the home, as superstition held that pre-marital intercourse might bring bad luck to the house. Whether or not the man raped his victim, the abduction would shame the woman or girl and force her to stay with her kidnapper to keep her reputation. As in other cultures, sometimes couples would elope by staging false kidnappings to secure the parents' consent.

== In religion ==
In Catholic canon law, the impediment of raptus specifically prohibits marriage between a woman abducted with the intent to force her to marry, and her abductor, as long as the woman remains in the abductor's power. According to the second provision of the law, should the woman decide to accept the abductor as a husband after she is safe, she will be allowed to marry him. The canon defines raptus as a "violent" abduction, accompanied by physical violence or threats, or fraud or deceit. The Council of Trent insisted that the abduction in raptus must be for the purpose of marriage to count as an impediment to marriage.

== In film ==
=== Features ===
Bride capture has been reflected in feature films from many cultures, sometimes humorously, sometimes as social commentary.

Bride kidnapping is depicted as an American frontier solution in the 1954 Hollywood musical Seven Brides for Seven Brothers. Stephen Vincent Benét wrote a short story called "The Sobbin' Women" that parodied the legend of the rape of the Sabine women. The short story, and then the film, focus on seven gauche but sincere backwoodsmen, one of whom gets married and encourages the others to seek partners. After a social where they meet girls they are attracted to, they are denied the chance to pursue their courtship by the latter's menfolk. Following the Roman example, they abduct the girls. As in the original tale, the women are at first indignant but are eventually won over.

The 1960 Hong Kong film Qiangpin (The Bride Hunter) portrays the custom in the format of an all-female Yue opera comedy, in which Xia Meng plays a gender-bending role as a man masquerading as a woman. Bride kidnapping is displayed somewhat humorously in Pedro Almodóvar's 1990 Spanish hit ¡Átame! (Tie Me Up! Tie Me Down!), starring Antonio Banderas and Victoria Abril. It is the underlying theme behind the 2005 Korean movie The Bow. In the 2006 comedy Borat: Cultural Learnings of America for Make Benefit Glorious Nation of Kazakhstan, the eponymous fictional reporter Borat, played by British comedian/satirist Sacha Baron Cohen, attempts to kidnap Canadian actress Pamela Anderson in order to take her as his wife. He brings a "wedding sack" which he has made for the occasion, suggesting that such kidnappings are a tradition in his parody of Kazakhstan.

On a more serious note, a 1970 Italian film, La moglie più bella (The Most Beautiful Wife) by Damiano Damiani and starring Ornella Muti, is based on the story of Franca Viola, described above. However, before the national debate caused by the Viola case, a 1964 satire directed by Pietro Germi, Seduced and Abandoned (Sedotta e abbandonata), treated the Sicilian custom as a dark comedy. The 2009 film Baarìa - la porta del vento shows a consensual fuitina in 20th-century Sicily (atypically having the couple enclosed in the girl's house) as the only way the lovers can avoid the girl's arranged marriage to a richer man.

Some Russian films and literature depict bride kidnapping in the Caucasus. There is a Soviet comedy entitled Kidnapping, Caucasian Style (Кавказская пленница, или Новые приключения Шурика, literally translated as The Girl Prisoner of the Caucasus), where a bride kidnapping occurs in an unidentified Caucasian country. The 2007 Kyrgyz film Pure Coolness also revolves around the bride kidnapping custom, mistaken identity, and the clash between modern urban expectations and the more traditional countryside.

=== Documentaries ===
In 2005, a documentary film entitled Bride Kidnapping in Kyrgyzstan made by Petr Lom was presented at the United Nations Association Film Festival, and subsequently on PBS and Investigation Discovery (ID) in the United States. The film met controversy in Kyrgyzstan because of ethical concerns about the filming of real kidnappings.

In December 2011 the Vice released a documentary film about bride kidnapping in Kyrgyzstan.

In 2021, a documentary titled Children of the Mist directed by Hà Lệ Diễm premiered at the International Documentary Film Festival Amsterdam (IDFA) and won the Best Directing Award. The documentary follows Di, a 12-year-old Hmong girl in northern Vietnam, over the course of three years as she approaches adolescence in a community where bride kidnapping is practiced as a traditional custom.

== In literature ==
The millennia-old Srimad Bhagavata Purana refers to "riksasa", the ritual kidnapping of the bride: Young Rukmini, "beautiful-eyed" and "with an exquisite waist", did not want the marriage arranged for her to Sisupala, the king of the Cedis, so she arranged to be abducted by Krishna. After he carried her away Krishna married Rukmini "according to the appropriate rights" amid the great joy of the citizens of Dvaraka.

In Frances Burney's novel, Camilla (1796), the heroine's sister, Eugenia, is kidnapped by an adventurer called Alphonso Bellamy. Eugenia decides to stay with her husband on the grounds that she believes her word is a solemn oath. Eugenia is fifteen years old, and so underage, and is coerced into the marriage—both were grounds for treating the marriage as illegal.

A Sherlock Holmes story features bride kidnapping. In "The Adventure of the Solitary Cyclist" (1903), a woman is employed as a governess by a man who knows that she will soon inherit a fortune, with the intent of a confederate marrying her. The ceremony does eventually occur, but is void.

The manga Otoyomegatari, or A Bride's Story, takes place in central Asia. The heroine is married to a boy in an outside clan, but regrets regarding this decision occur when her original clan has problems bearing heirs. Her birth family comes to retrieve her with the intention of marrying her to someone else, but without success. Her new family tells the invaders that the girl has been impregnated, which would be the last seal on the marriage. They doubt this has occurred as the groom is very young and, desperate, they resort to a kidnap attempt, but again fail.

George R.R. Martin's 2000 fantasy novel A Storm of Swords, the third book in Martin's A Song of Ice and Fire series, features marriage by capture (or "stealing a woman") as the traditional form of marriage north of the Wall. The Free Folk consider it a test for a man to "steal" a wife and outwit her attempts on his life long enough for her to respect his strength and come to love him. More often, though, marriages by capture are conducted between a couple already in love, an elopement without the extra element of attempted murder. Jon Snow and Ygritte have such a marriage by capture, although at the time Jon was ignorant of the custom and thought he was merely taking her prisoner. The Ironborn are also known to practice this custom, taking secondary wives while reaving the mainland, which they refer to as "salt wives".

The Tamora Pierce fantasy novel The Will of the Empress includes bride kidnapping as a major plot point and has extensive discussions of the morality of bride kidnapping. Multiple characters are kidnapped for the purpose of marriage during the novel, which is used as a warning against it (in keeping with the women's rights focus of her series), particularly in the case of poor women or those without social support systems.

== In television ==
In the BBC radio and television comedy series The League of Gentlemen, the character Papa Lazarou comes to the fictional town of Royston Vasey under the guise of a peg-seller. He seeks to kidnap women by entering their homes, talking gibberish to them (Gippog) and persuading them to hand over their wedding rings. He 'names' them all 'Dave', and, after obtaining their rings, proclaims; "you're my wife now". In Criminal Minds, season 4, episode 13 titled "Bloodline" depicts bride kidnapping.

== See also ==
- Particular cases mentioned:
  - ukuthwalwa in South Africa
  - ala kachuu in Kyrgyzstan
  - ngerorod in Indonesia
  - índia pega no laço in Brazil
  - Bride kidnapping in Azerbaijan
  - raptio in South Europe
  - fuitina in Italy
- Bride price
- Bride burning
- Charivari
- Exchange of women
- Groom kidnapping
- History of rape
- Honour killing
- Shotgun wedding, a sudden wedding, often because the bride is pregnant
- Stockholm syndrome, when a captive grows to identify with their captor

== Bibliography ==
=== Books ===
- Adekunle, Julius. Culture and Customs of Rwanda, Greenwood Publishing Group (2007).
- Kovalesky, Maxime. Modern Customs and Ancient Laws of Russia, London: David, Nutt & Strand (1891).
- Pamporov, Alexey. Romani everyday life in Bulgaria Sofia: IMIR (2006). (in Bulgarian)

=== Journal articles ===
- Ayres, Barbara "Bride Theft and Raiding for Wives in Cross-Cultural Perspective", Anthropological Quarterly, Vol. 47, No. 3, Kidnapping and Elopement as Alternative Systems of Marriage (Special Issue) (July 1974), p. 245
- Barnes, R. H. "Marriage by Capture." The Journal of the Royal Anthropological Institute, Vol. 5, No. 1. (March 1999), pp. 57–73.
- Bates, Daniel G. "Normative and Alternative Systems of Marriage among the Yörük of Southeastern Turkey." Anthropological Quarterly, 47:3 (July 1974), pp. 270–287.
- Evans-Grubbs, Judith. "Abduction Marriage in Antiquity: A Law of Constantine (CTh IX. 24. I) and Its Social Context" The Journal of Roman Studies, Vol. 79, 1989, pp. 59–83.
- Handrahan, Lori. 2004. "Hunting for Women: Bride-Kidnapping in Kyrgyzstan." International Feminist Journal of Politics, 6:2 (June), 207–233.
- Herzfeld, Michael "Gender Pragmatics: Agency, Speech, and Bride Theft in a Cretan Mountain Village." Anthropology 1985, Vol. IX: 25–44.
- Kleinbach, Russ and Salimjanova, Lilly (2007). "Kyz ala kachuu and adat: non-consensual bride kidnapping and tradition in Kyrgyzstan", Central Asian Survey, 26:2, 217–233.
- Kleinbach, Russell. "Frequency of non-consensual bride kidnapping in the Kyrgyz Republic." International Journal of Central Asian Studies. Vol 8, No 1, 2003, pp. 108–128.
- Kleinbach, Russell, Mehrigiul Ablezova and Medina Aitieva. "Kidnapping for marriage (ala kachuu) in a Kyrgyz village." Central Asian Survey. (June 2005) 24(2), 191–202. available in 2004 Transitions.
- Kowalewsky, M. "Marriage among the Early Slavs", Folklore, Vol. 1, No. 4 (December 1890), pp. 463–480.
- Light, Nathan and Damira Imanalieva. "Performing Ala Kachuu: Marriage Strategies in the Kyrgyz Republic".
- McLaren, Anne E., "Marriage by Abduction in Twentieth Century China", Modern Asian Studies 35(4) (October 2001), pp. 953–984.
- Pamporov, Alexey "Sold like a donkey? Bride-price among the Bulgarian Roma" Journal of the Royal Anthropological Institute (N.S.) 13, 471–476 (2007)
- Rimonte, Nilda "A Question of Culture: Cultural Approval of Violence against Women in the Pacific-Asian Community and the Cultural Defense'", Stanford Law Review, Vol. 43, No. 6 (July 1991), pp. 1311–1326.
- Stross, Brian. "Tzeltal Marriage by Capture." Anthropological Quarterly. 47:3 (July 1974), pp. 328–346.
- Werner, Cynthia, "Women, marriage, and the nation-state: the rise of nonconsensual bride kidnapping in post-Soviet Kazakhstan", in The Transformation of Central Asia. Pauline Jones Luong, ed. Ithaca, New York: Cornell University Press, 2004, pp. 59–89.
- Yang, Jennifer Ann. "Marriage By Capture in the Hmong Culture: The Legal Issue of Cultural Rights Versus Women's Rights", Law and Society Review at UCSB, Vol. 3, pp. 38–49 (2004).

=== Human rights reports ===
- Amnesty International, Georgia—Thousands Suffering in Silence: Violence Against Women in the Family, AI Index: EUR 56/009/2006, September 2006 (last accessed 18 August 2011).
- Georgian Young Lawyers' Association & OMCT, Violence Against Women in Georgia: Report submitted on the occasion of the 36th session of the UN Committee on the Elimination of Discrimination Against Women, August 2006 (last accessed 18 August 2011).
- Human Rights Watch (26 September 2006). "Reconciled to Violence: State Failure to Stop Domestic Abuse and Abduction of Women in Kyrgyzstan". Human Rights Watch.
- Ireland: Refugee Documentation Centre, "Georgia: Bride-kidnapping in Georgia", 8 June 2009 (last accessed 18 August 2011).
- Pusurmankulova, Burulai, "Bride Kidnapping. Benign Custom Or Savage Tradition?", Freedom House, 14 June 2004 (last accessed 18 August 2011).
- U.S. Department of State, Rwanda: Country Reports on Human Rights Practices – 2007, 11 March 2008 (last accessed 28 January 2009).
- OSCE, Building the Capacity of Roma Communities to Prevent Trafficking in Human Beings, 12 June 2007, (last accessed 9 March 2012).

=== News articles and radio reports ===
- Aminova, Alena "Uzbekistan: No Love Lost in Karakalpak Bride Thefts", Institute of War and Peace Reporting, 14 June 2004
- Armstrong, Jane, "Rage or Romance?", Globe and Mail (Canada), 26 April 2008
- BBC, "Ethiopia: Revenge of the Abducted Bride", 18 June 1999
- Brooks, Courtney & Amina Umarova, "Despite Official Measures, Bride Kidnapping Endemic in Chechnya", Radio Free Europe, 21 October 2010
- Kokhodze, Gulo & Tamuna Uchidze, "Bride Theft Rampant in Southern Georgia", Institute of War and Peace Reporting, 15 June 2006
- Najibullah, Farangis, "Bride Kidnapping: A Tradition or a Crime?", Radio Free Europe, 21 May 2011
- Isayev, Ruslan, "In Chechnya, Attempts to Eradicate Bride Abduction", Prague Watchdog, 16 November 2007
- Kiryashova, Sabina, "Azeri Bride Kidnappers Risk Heavy Sentences", Institute of War and Peace Reporting, 17 November 2005
- McDonald, Henry, "Gardai Hunt Gang Accused of Seizing Roma Child Bride", The Guardian, UK, 3 September 2007
- NPR Weekend Edition Sunday, "Kidnapping Custom Makes a Comeback in Georgia", 14 May 2006
- Rakhimdinova, Aijan, "Kyrgyz Bride Price Controversy", Institute of War and Peace Reporting, 22 December 2005
- Rodriguez, Alex, "Kidnapping a Bride Practice Embraced in Kyrgyzstan", Augusta Chronicle, 24 July 2005
- Ruremesha, Jean, "RIGHTS-RWANDA: Marriage by Abduction Worries Women's Groups", Inter Press Service, 7 October 2003
- Smith, Craig S., "Abduction, Often Violent, a Kyrgyz Wedding Rite", NY Times, 30 April 2005

=== Dissertations and academic papers ===
- Moua, Teng, "The Hmong Culture: Kinship, Marriage & Family Systems", University of Wisconsin–Stout (May 2003)
- Pamporov, Alexey, Roma/Gypsy Population in Bulgaria as a Challenge to Policy Relevance (2006)
