= Pure Coolness =

Pure Coolness/Boz Salkyn
- Directed by: Ernest Abdyjaparov
- Starring: Asem Toktobekova
- Release date: 19 May 2007 (Cannes Film Festival)
- Running time: 95 minutes
- Country: Kyrgyzstan
- Language: Kyrgyz

Pure Coolness (Kyrgyz: Boz Salkyn) is a 2007 film by Kyrgyz director Ernest Abdyjaparov. It won the NETPAC award at the 2007 Asiatica Film Mediale "for a film which with its own gentle touches of originality and humour, [and] is beautiful, surprising and uplifting".

== Plot ==
The film is about the traditional custom of Ala kachuu – "bride stealing". The film addresses the question of whether the practice can be defended in this day and age, even if the couple end up living "happily ever after". The tale that it tells explores a variety of themes, including family loyalty, deception, betrayal and love.

Asema (played by Asem Toktobekova) is a city girl who is dating a boy, Murat, from a small village. She announces to her parents that she is going with her boyfriend to his village to meet his family. Her mother pleads with her not to go, informing her that bride kidnapping still occurs in the country side. While there, and after trying to go back home after she catches her boyfriend with an old flame, she becomes a victim of mistaken identity. She is kidnapped to be the bride of Sagyn, the village shepherd, instead of a local orphan that has been chosen for him by his relatives.

== Award nominations ==
- Eastern European Film Festival, Cottbus, Germany – nominated for Grand Prize 2007
- Nika Awards 2007 – nominated for Best Film from the CIS and Baltic States.

== Popularity ==
According to the film's director, the movie was so popular in Kyrgyzstan that in 2007, 20% of newborn girls were named Asema, after the film's main character.

== See also ==
- Kidnapping, Caucasian style
