= Bet David =

Reform Jewish synagogue in South Africa

- Location of the synagogue in Greater Johannesburg

Religion
- Affiliation: Reform Judaism
- Ecclesiastical or organizational status: Synagogue
- Year consecrated: 1971; 1977; 2017
- Status: Active

Location
- Location: 3 Middle Rd, Morningside, Sandton, 2057
- Country: South Africa
- Interactive map of Bet David

Architecture
- Architect: Jack Jankes
- Type: Synagogue architecture

Website
- betdavid.org.za

Bet David Progressive Jewish Congregation (previously Temple David), is a Progressive Jewish congregation and synagogue. It is located in Morningside in the Sandton area of Johannesburg. The congregation has had three synagogues during its lifetime, beginning in 1971. A larger synagogue was then built and consecrated in 1977. More recently, it's present and third synagogue was consecrated in 2017. It is an affiliate of the South African Union for Progressive Judaism (SAUPJ), which is part of the World Union for Progressive Judaism (WUPJ).

== History ==
The congregation was established with its first synagogue in Morningside, consecrated in 1971. A larger rondavel-style synagogue was built on the site and consecrated in 1977. It was designed by architect Jack Jankes, who was also chairman of the congregation. Rabbi Moses Cyrus Weiler returned to Johannesburg from his home in Israel to attend the consecration. It was set among gardens on a large plot.

In 1986, the Mitzvah School was opened in the congregation's grounds. The school catered to disadvantaged students from Alexandra township in their final year of Matric. This came in defiance of the Group Areas Act which forbade black students from a township from studying in Morningside, then designated as a whites-only suburb. The school received financial support from donors and the Temple David congregation. It closed in 2023 after 37 years of operations.

In recent years a decision was made to sell most of the plot and build a new sanctuary on the remaining plot. Stained glass windows depicting the Ten Commandments and two large Temple menorah lights from the older sanctuary were removed and refitted in the new sanctuary. The new sanctuary was consecrated on Erev Rosh Hashanah in 2017 and incorporates some of the design of the previous sanctuaries.

== Rabbis ==
- Rabbi Leo Michel Abrami (Abramowski) (1931–2018) served the congregation for three years during late apartheid era
- Rabbi Hillel Avidan, succeeded Abrami
- Rabbi Adrian Michael Schell served the congregation for six years from 2014 to 2020

== See also ==
- History of the Jews in South Africa
- List of synagogues in South Africa
