= Merariq =

Merariq is a traditional marriage practice in the Sasak culture of Lombok, Indonesia, in which a woman is taken away from her home by her future husband before a wedding, symbolically imitating a bride kidnapping, but with the consent of the parents.

== Description ==
In Merariq, the practice involves the symbolic "elopement" of the bride and groom, where the bride is taken (or "kidnapped") to the groom's house. However, this is consensual and part of an established cultural norm, with both the bride and groom's families typically aware of and involved in the process. It is a traditional ritual rather than an actual forced abduction.

However, the practice has recently been misinterpreted and used as an excuse for non-consensual bride kidnapping.
