= Ala kachuu =

Form of bride kidnapping in Kyrgyzstan

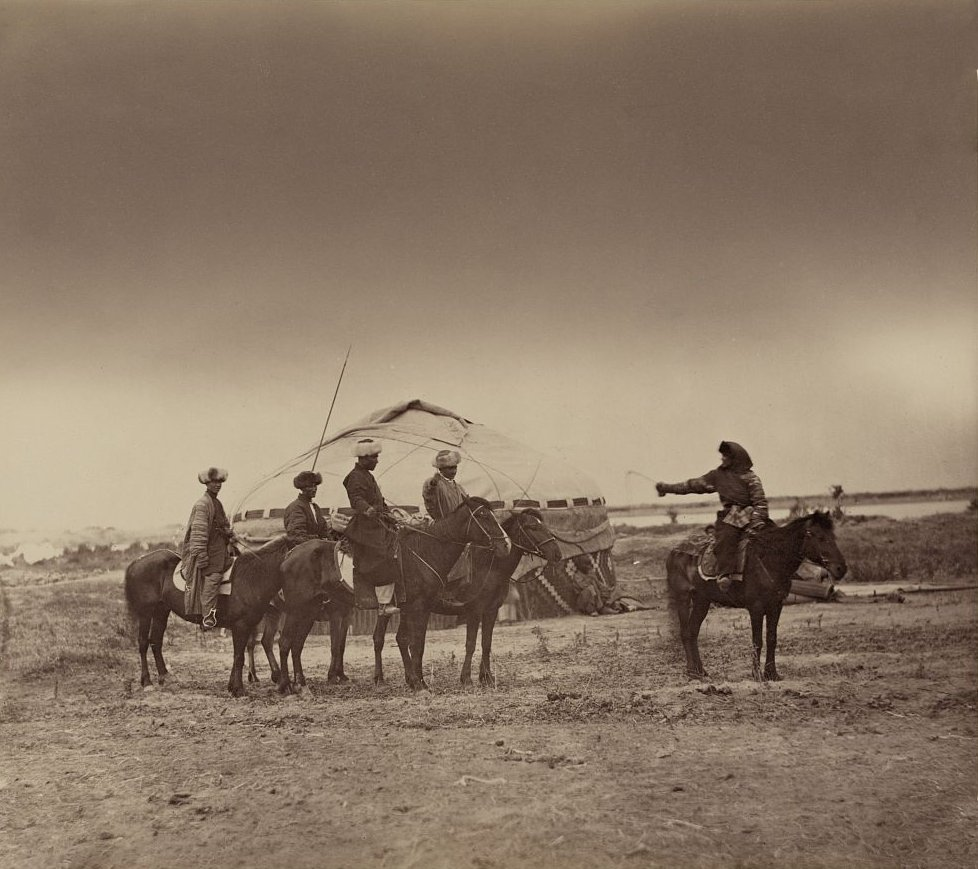
A woman (first from right) and four men on horses preparing to "kidnap" her. Kyrgyz steppe, between 1871 and 1872

Ala kachuu (Kyrgyz: ала качуу) is a form of bride kidnapping practiced in Kyrgyzstan. The term can apply to a variety of actions, ranging from a consensual elopement to a non-consensual kidnapping, and to what extent it actually happens is controversial. Some sources suggest that as of 2005 at least a third of Kyrgyzstan's brides had been taken against their will.

Kyz ala kachuu (Kyrgyz: кыз ала качуу) means "to take a young woman and run away". The typical non-consensual variety involves the young man abducting a woman either by force or by guile, often accompanied by friends or male relatives. They often take her to his family home, where she is kept in a room until the man's female relatives convince her to put on the scarf of a married woman as a sign of acceptance. Sometimes, if the woman resists the persuasion and maintains her wish to return home, her relatives try to convince her to agree to the marriage.

The practice was suppressed during the Soviet period, but, after the collapse of the Soviet Union, ala kachuu began to resurface. There are conflicting reports on whether it continues in the original way or not. Some sources state that the practice was originally a form of elopement, not a bride theft. Sometimes the kidnapping may be just a wedding formality, where the woman comes along willingly. Some people even consider it an honour to be kidnapped because it demonstrates that the woman is worthy of being a wife.

Although bride-kidnapping is illegal in Kyrgyzstan, the government has been accused of not taking proper steps to protect women from this practice.

== History ==
The history of bride kidnapping in Kyrgyzstan is under dispute. The Russian Empire and later USSR made the ancient practice of the nomads illegal, and so with the fall of the Soviet Union and the subsequent independence of the Central Asian nations, many have revived old customs as a way of asserting cultural identity. Rejecting a kidnapping is often culturally unacceptable for women, and perceived as a rejection of the Kyrgyz cultural identity. The practice is also associated with asserting masculinity. Recent studies challenge the claims that bride kidnapping used to be prevalent. According to Kyrgyz historians, and Fulbright scholar Russell Kleinbach, whereas kidnappings were rare until Soviet times, the bride kidnapping tradition has dramatically increased in the 20th century. The rise in bride kidnappings may be connected with difficulty in paying the required bride price (kalym).

In 2018, 19-year-old Burulai Turdalieva was abducted by a 30-year-old man. Eventually Burulai was found along with her kidnapper and the two were taken to a police station. While at the station, the man stabbed Turdalieva to death. The kidnapper also stabbed himself, but survived. Later, he was found guilty of murder and kidnapping and sentenced to 20 years in prison.

== Prevalence ==
A major issue is the question how often this happens. Mongolia has a victimization survey in Kyrgyzstan (2015) included the crime of kidnapping of young women for marriage. 14% of married women answered that they were kidnapped at the time and that two thirds of these cases were consensual, the woman knew the man and had agreed with it up front. This means that about 5% of current marriages in Kyrgyzstan are cases of 'Ala Kachuu'. Using the same methodology, a 2018 study in Kazakhstan resulted in an estimated 1-1.5% of current marriages in Kazakhstan are the result of 'Ala Kachuu'.

Studies by researcher Russell Kleinbach have found much larger numbers, namely that approximately half of all Kyrgyz marriages include bride kidnapping; of those kidnappings, two thirds are non-consensual.

== Bride-money ==
According to a 1992 study, the bride-money for Dungan brides fluctuated between 240 and 400 rubles. Poor Dungans find Kirghiz brides, or marry Tatar or Sart women. Dungans also secretly abduct Kirghiz girls as brides.

== Legality ==
Despite its illegality, in many primarily rural areas, bride kidnapping is an accepted and common way of taking a wife.

The matter is somewhat confused by the local use of the term "bride kidnap" to reflect practices along a continuum, from forcible abduction and rape (and then, almost unavoidably, marriage), to something akin to an elopement arranged between the two young people, to which both sets of parents have to consent after the fact.

Although the practice is illegal in Kyrgyzstan, bride kidnappers are rarely prosecuted. This reluctance to enforce the code is in part caused by the pluralistic legal system in Kyrgyszstan where many villages are de facto ruled by councils of elders and aqsaqal courts following customary law, away from the eyes of the state legal system. Aqsaqal courts, tasked with adjudicating family law, property and torts, often fail to take bride kidnapping seriously. In many cases, aqsaqal members are invited to the kidnapped bride's wedding and encourage the family of the bride to accept the marriage.

== Examples ==
In one model of bride kidnapping present in Kyrgyzstan, the young man decides he wishes to marry and asks his parents to pick him out a suitable bride, or is told by his parents that it is time he settled down and that they have found someone of the right background and attributes. (In this sense, it may be similar to an arranged marriage, although the arranging is all on one side.) The prospective groom and his male relatives or friends or both abduct the girl (in the old nomadic days, on horseback; now often by car) and take her to the family home. Once there, the man's relatives may attempt to convince the woman to accept the marriage, and to place a white wedding scarf (jooluk) on her head to symbolize her agreement. They may do this by pointing out the advantages of the union, such as the wealth of their smallholding, to show her what she would gain by joining their family. Families may use force or threaten to curse the woman if she leaves, an effective threat in a superstitious country. Some families will keep the girl hostage for several days to break her will. Others will let her go if she remains defiant; she may, for example, refuse to sit down or to eat, as a sign that she is refusing the proffered hospitality. During this period, the groom typically does not see the bride until she has agreed to marry or at least has agreed to stay. The kidnapped woman's family may also become involved, either urging the woman to stay (particularly if the marriage is believed socially acceptable or advantageous for the prospective bride and her family), or opposing the marriage on various grounds and helping to liberate the woman.

In other models of bride kidnapping in Kyrgyzstan and other areas of Central Asia, the woman may be a complete stranger to the man prior to the abduction. Sometimes the groom and his family, rather than selecting a particular young woman to kidnap, decide on a household; that way they can still kidnap one of the sisters if the woman they desire is not home. As in other societies, often the men who resort to bride kidnapping are socially undesirable for a variety of reasons; they may be more likely to be violent, have a criminal history, or to be substance abusers.

The bride kidnapping process sometimes includes rape. Even when sex does not take place, once a woman has been kept overnight, even for a single night, her virginity is put in doubt. With her honor disgraced, she will have very few other options for marriage. Thus, after one night of capture, the woman is culturally compelled to marry the man. Such immense social stigma is attached to a refusal to marry after a kidnap that the kidnapped woman usually feels that she has no choice but to agree, and some of those who refuse even commit suicide after the kidnapping.

According to the United States Embassy, two American women were bride-kidnapped in rural Kyrgyzstan in 2007. As soon as the boys discovered that the women were not Kyrgyzs but foreign (American with a Central Asian appearance) they were returned to the place they were taken from.

== In popular culture ==
In 2004, Peter Lom made a documentary called Ala Kachuu (trans. as Bride Kidnapping).

== See also ==
- Raptus, for a comparison of how the Catholic Church handled bride capture
- Sex trafficking in Kyrgyzstan
- Bride kidnapping
- Vani (custom)
