= Children of the Mist (film) =

2021 Vietnamese documentary film by Hà Lệ Diễm

- Promotional poster
- Directed by: Hà Lệ Diễm
- Produced by: Phương Thảo Trần, Swann Dubus
- Starring: Ma Thi Di
- Cinematography: Hà Lệ Diễm
- Edited by: Swann Dubus
- Production companies: Varan Vietnam, Zorba Production
- Distributed by: Film Movement
- Release date: 19 November 2021
- Running time: 92 minutes
- Country: Vietnam
- Languages: Hmong, Vietnamese

Children of the Mist is a 2021 Vietnamese documentary film directed by Hà Lệ Diễm and produced by Phương Thảo Trần and Swann Dubus. It follows Di, a 12-year-old Hmong girl in northern Vietnam, over the course of three years as she approaches adolescence in a community where traditional customs such as bride kidnapping are practiced.

== Synopsis ==
The film documents Di’s daily life and family dynamics in the village of Sapa. It focuses on her experience with the practice of bride kidnapping, which the film presents in the context of local Hmong customs.

== Production ==
According to the film’s press materials, Hà Lệ Diễm began filming in 2017 and followed Di’s life over a three-year period. Diễm served as both director and cinematographer.

== Release ==
The film premiered at the International Documentary Film Festival Amsterdam (IDFA) in 2021. It later screened at the Cork International Film Festival and DOK.fest München.

== Reception ==
Children of the Mist received positive critical reception. Guy Lodge of Variety called it "a first-rate documentary" and noted its "even-handed approach to sensitive subject matter." Phuong Le of The Guardian described it as a “shattering view of forced marriage in rural Vietnam." Brian Tallerico of RogerEbert.com wrote that the film “packs an emotional punch” while maintaining an observational tone.

== Awards ==
- Best Directing Award – International Documentary Film Festival Amsterdam (IDFA)
- Award for Cinematic Documentary – Cork International Film Festival
- DOK.fest Award of SOS-Kinderdörfer weltweit – DOK.fest München
