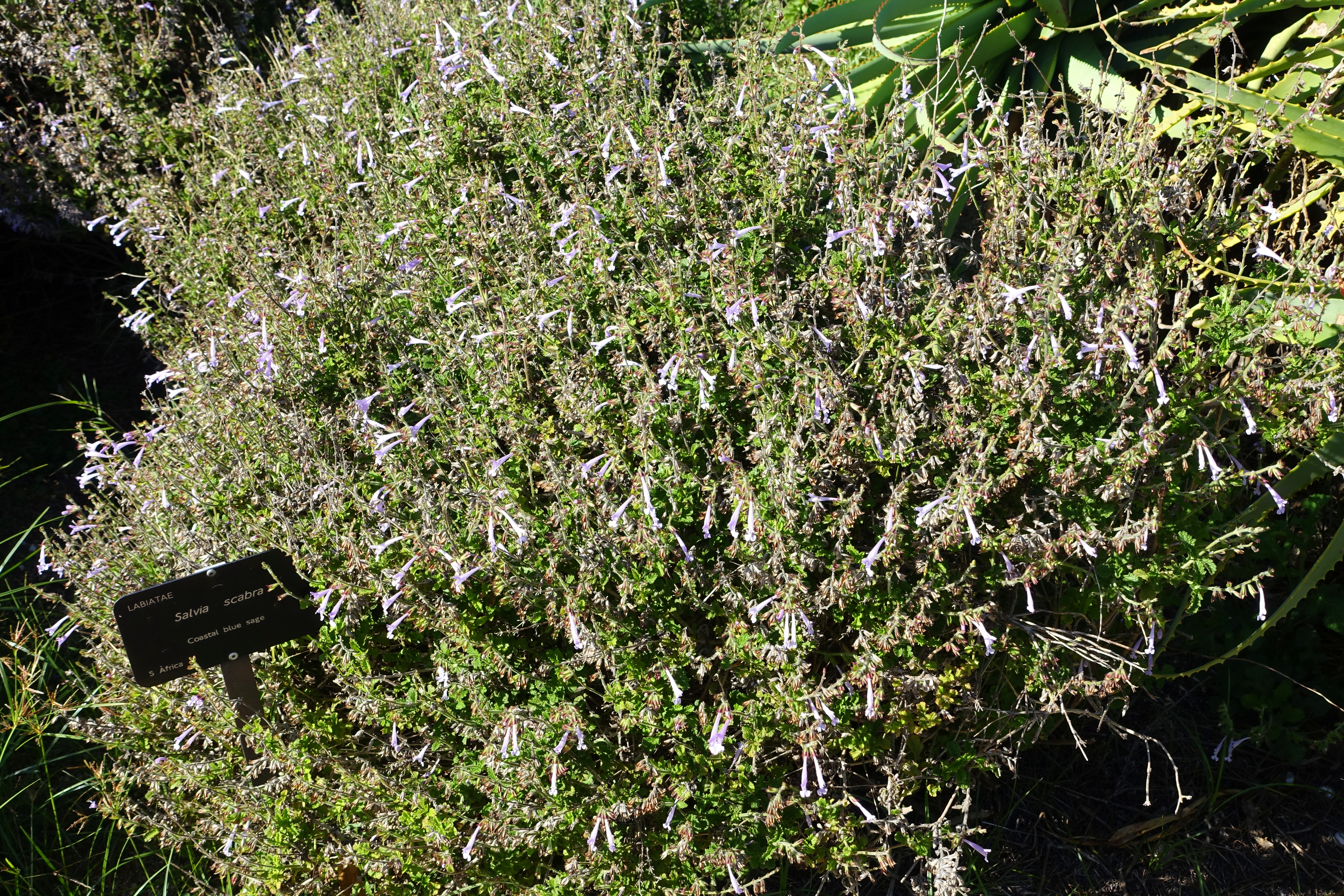

Conservation status
- Least Concern (SANBI Red List)

Scientific classification
- Kingdom: Plantae
- Clade: Tracheophytes
- Clade: Angiosperms
- Clade: Eudicots
- Clade: Asterids
- Order: Lamiales
- Family: Lamiaceae
- Genus: Salvia
- Species: S. scabra

Binomial name
- Salvia scabra Thunb.

= Salvia scabra =

Species of flowering plant

Salvia scabra (coastal blue sage) is a herbaceous perennial native to the southeastern strand of the Cape of Good Hope in South Africa, growing on sandy shores, coastal brush, and hilly slopes up to an elevation of 600 feet. It was described and named by Carl Thunberg in 1800. The leaves and an extract from the roots have been used medicinally in its native region for at least one hundred years. Salvia scabra was introduced to California gardens around 1996 and is extremely adaptable to many types of conditions. Since then, it has spread to gardens in England, France, and Italy.

== Description ==
Salvia scabra reaches 3 feet in height in the wild and about 1.5 feet in cultivation, developing woody stems that are pale brown, round, and covered with short hairs. The leaves are lyre-shaped and lobed, with the lobes becoming more pronounced as the plant matures. The mid-green leaves appear to grow in thick bunches and have a rough surface, which explains the specific epithet scabra. The inflorescences are short, with up to six flowers per whorl. The .5-inch flowers are long, straight, and tube-shaped and vary in color from pale pink to pale lilac, with a short, hairy calyx that is tinged purple. The calyx expands as the seeds ripen, with the plant producing abundant seed and daughter plants.

== See also ==
- Muti § Use of Isicakathi in the Eastern Cape
