= Muti =

Southern African traditional medicine system

Muthi is a traditional medicine practice in Southern Africa as far north as Lake Tanganyika.

== Name ==
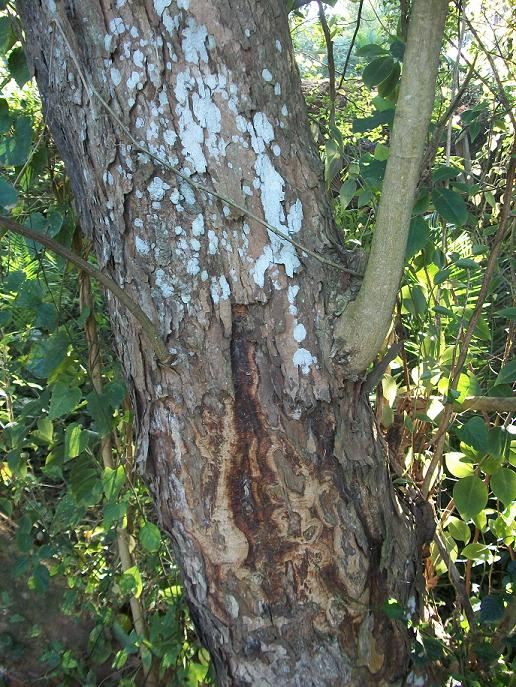
Stem of Margaritaria discoidea at Ilanda Wilds, South Africa, showing old scar from bark removal for muti use

In South African English, the word muti is derived from the Zulu/Xhosa/Northern Ndebele umuthi, meaning 'tree', whose root is -thi. In Southern Africa, muti and other cognates of umuthi are in widespread use in most indigenous African languages as well as in South African English and Afrikaans, which sometimes use muti as a slang word for medicine in general.

This noun is of the umu/imi class so the singular ('tree') is umuthi and the plural ('trees') is imithi. Since the pronunciation of the initial vowel of this class is unstressed, the singular is sometimes pronounced muthi. The word is rendered as muti by the historical effects of the British colonial spelling.

In colloquial English and Afrikaans the word muti is often used to refer to medicines in general or medicines that have a 'miraculous' effect, e.g.

- "Die dokter het 'muti' op die seerplek gesmeer en die volgende dag was dit heeltemal gesond." (The doctor rubbed muti on the wound and the next day it was completely healed.)
- "My dokter het vir my 'muti' verskaf vir my seer keel." ("My doctor gave me some muti for my sore throat.")

== Traditional medicine ==
African traditional medicine makes use of various natural products, many derived from trees and other plants. Botanical medicine prescribed by an inyanga or herbal healer is generally known as "muthi", but the term can apply to other traditional medical formulations, including those that are zoological or mineral in composition.

Vulture brains are used for prophecy in muthi.

== Use of Isicakathi in the Eastern Cape ==
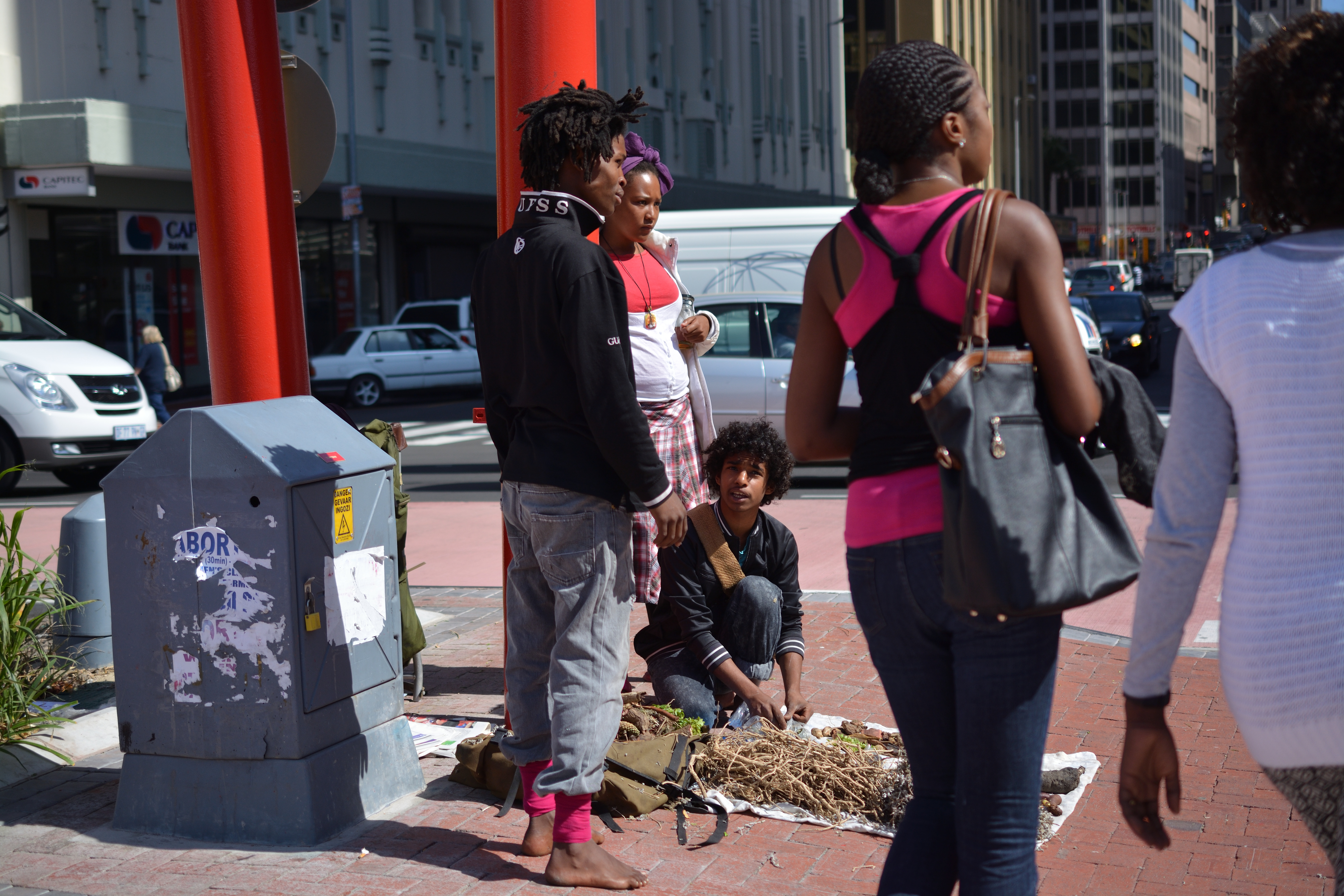
Street muti vendor in South Africa

Isicakathi is a term that is used by Xhosa people when referring to plants with supposed pharmacological and therapeutic properties that are used as medicine for various ailments.

The people in the Eastern Cape of South Africa still strongly rely on traditional medicine and believe in its potency as an alternative to western medicine. There are various herbs that fall under isicakathi, used for pre-natal and post-natal medicine (although they can also be used for non-pregnancy related health issues). The plants that fall under the isicakathi category differ according to the districts in the Eastern Cape, hence it is a general term used when referring to traditional medicine. There are eleven species of plants that fall under isicakathi, namely Commelina africana, Agapanthus praecox, Chlorophytum comosum, Ledebouria ovatifolia, Ranunculus multifidus, Thunbergia atriplicifolia, Kohautia amatymbica, Plantago major, Gazania linearis, Helichrysum pedunculatum and Senecio coronatus. The use of these plants differs according to the various areas/ districts of the Eastern Cape. Commelina africana is used for menstrual problems, pelvic pains and bladder related issues. Agapanthus is found in pre-natal and post-natal medicine, which is used by pregnant women. Chlorophytum comosum is used as a protective charm against evil spirits for both mother and child. Ledebouria ovatifolia is used for medicinal purposes, including pregnancy, diarrhoea, influenza, backaches, skin irritations and wounds. Ranunculus multifidus is used for epileptic fits in adults, lung problems and used as an emetic. Kohautia amatymbica is also used as an emetic. Plantago major is used for wounds, inflammations, and eye irritations. Gazania linearis is applied on small cuts made on the body close to the joints to protect someone from evil spirits. Helichrysum pedunculatum is used as a dressing after circumcision and to prevent the wound from getting septic. Senecio coronatus is used to get rid of pubic lice. Generally, isicakathi or plants that are regarded to fall under isicakathi are mostly used by pregnant women and children. Thus, it is also used as a protective measure against sorcery during pregnancy.

=== Isicakathi for pre-natal and post-natal care ===
Agapanthus praecox is one of the plants that falls under isicakathi used during pregnancy. It is taken orally from the six month of pregnancy until delivery. The plant is put in a container full of water and half a cup of that water is taken orally, twice a day, in the morning and in the evening. It is believed that the plant’s growth determines the health of the unborn baby. The wilting of the plant is regarded as a symbol with regard to the baby's health, usually associated with death. Isicakathi is widely used to induce easy childbirth. It ensures that excess water is drained, reduces vaginal discharge and placental size. The plants treat high blood pressure in both antenatal and postnatal care for women, whilst also preventing constipation.

Rhoicissus tidentata is used to induce labour; its root can be used to prepare an enema. Erythrina lysistemon is used to induce labour pains during the childbirth process via pieces of the trunk's bark bound together and infused for the woman to drink. The crushed bulb of Gunnera perpensa is used to reduce swelling of the feet by infusing with boiling water and ingesting.

=== The use of Isicakathi on the baby ===
Salvia scabra, mixed with the mother’s milk, is given as medicine to infants. The mixture is given to the baby to ingest every day for two months. Isicakathi is generally used to induce growth and prevent diseases. It is also used as an alternative to the mother’s milk and to counteract the milk’s sourness. The use of Agapanthus praecox ensures that the baby is strong, whilst preventing bowel problems and crusts on its head.

An ointment is used to hasten the parturition of the baby and placenta using the leaves of Scutia mytina. Erythrina humeana is used to heal the umbilical cord of the baby by burning the bark and using the powder to apply on the baby.

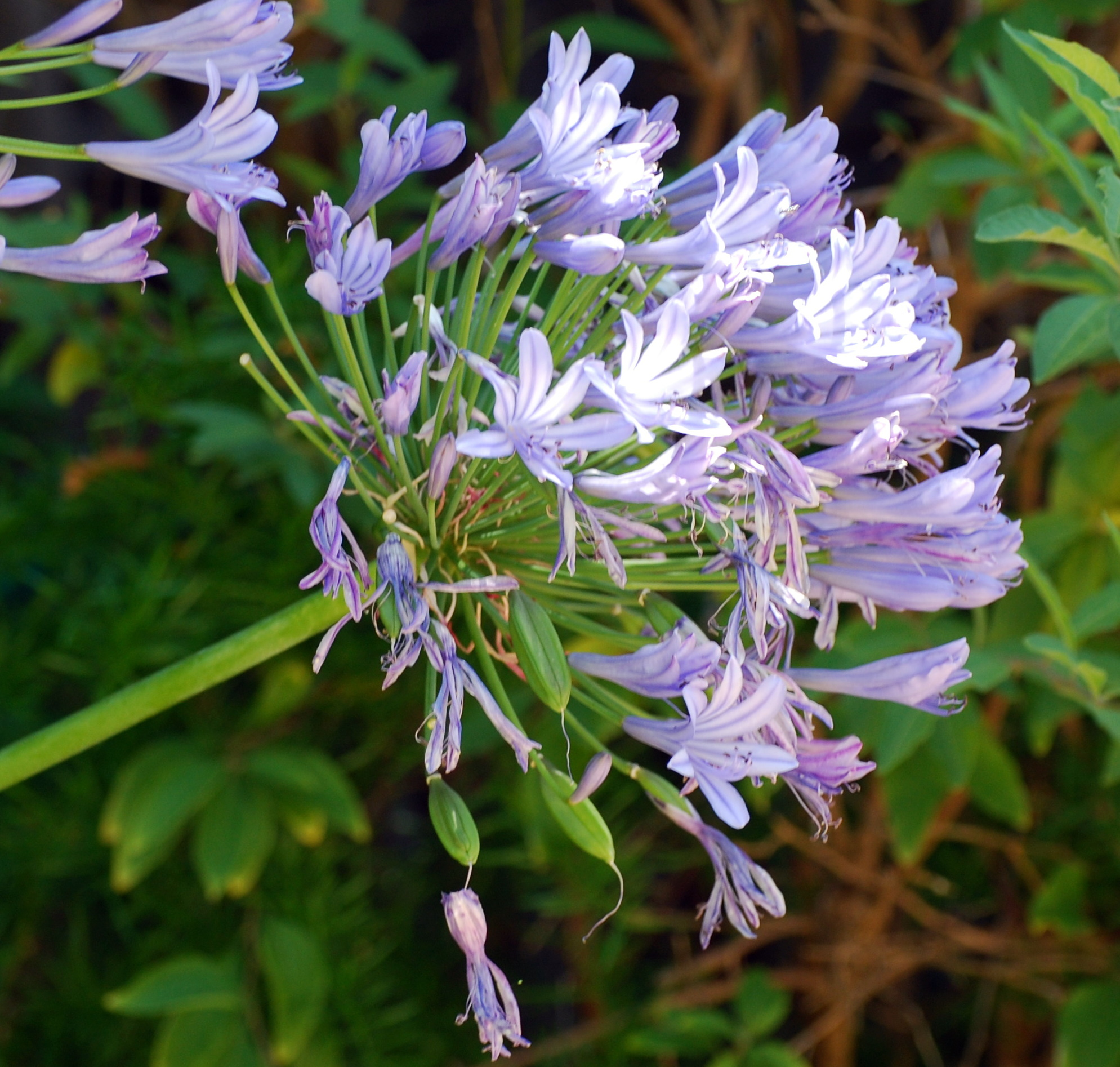
Agapanthus praecox flower

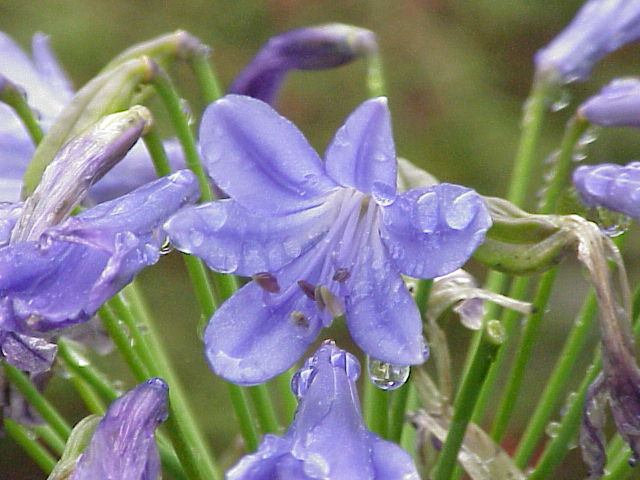
Agapanthus africanus flower

== Fossils used in muti ==
A variety of invertebrate and vertebrate fossils, including hyraceum, are claimed to be used for magical and healing purposes in South Africa. A Triassic era dinosaur fossil site was initially planned for use in providing muti by the Shepard that discovered it before the buyer raised concerns that they may be of human ancestors. In general, the use of fossilized bone fragments of unclear species is discouraged for fears they may belong to ancestors.

== Muti killings ==
Occasions of murder with mutilation associated with some traditional medicine practices in South Africa have been termed muti killings. These are not human sacrifices directly, but rather involve the murder of someone in order to harvest body parts for incorporation into traditional medicines and rituals.

In July 1983, the government of Eswatini carried out the last execution to date by the Kingdom by hanging Philippa Mdluli, who had been convicted of a March 1980 child murder during a muti ritual aimed at making her business more successful.

In February 2010, Deputy Provincial Commissioner William Mpembe of the South African Police Service (SAPS) in North West Province said that "muti murders, particularly those involving young children, seem to be on the rise in the Tshwane areas including Soshanguve, Garankuwa and Rietgat". That same month, African traditiopnal healers and the Gauteng government convened at a seminar in Pretoria, South Africa to root out the "evil practice of mutilating human bodies for purposes of muti making."

== See also ==
- Kidnapping in South Africa
- Medicine murder
- Murder of Masego Kgomo
- Persecution of people with albinism
- Traditional healers of South Africa
