= Bride kidnapping in Azerbaijan =

Bride kidnapping (Azerbaijani: Qız qaçırtma), has a long history in Azerbaijan and the Caucasus, it entails a variety of actions, ranging from a consensual elopement to a non-consensual kidnapping, and the extent to which it happens is controversial. It is considered to be relatively common.

Kidnapping by itself is punishable by 5 years in Azerbaijani civil code, but it often goes unenforced in rural areas.

== History ==
The Russian Empire and later USSR made the ancient practice formally illegal, though it often went unenforced, and was suppressed mainly in urban areas. Rejecting a kidnapping is often culturally unacceptable for women in rural areas, and is perceived as an insult to her family's honor.

== Prevalence ==
Prominent cases include one in Qabala, in which 40-year-old İntiqam Nabiyev kidnapped 13-year-old Senuber Hacıyeva after a family dispute. Though the government has worked to suppress the practice, it has never been entirely eradicated. In 2019, a Georgian high school teacher from the Azerbaijani-majority region of Karayaz in Gardabani was made to apologize for criticizing the practice. Another prominent case occurred in 2020 in Barda district.

== In popular culture ==
In 1985, the studio Azerbaijanfilm released the movie Bəyin oğurlanması, which deals with the topic. In 2018, there was a movie made about the practice called Qız Qaçırtma, directed by Rufet Shahbazov. It went on to receive two sequels.
