= Murder of Leigh Matthews =

South African murder victim

Leigh Matthews
- Born: 8 July 1983
- Disappeared: 9 July 2004; Morningside, Johannesburg
- Died: 9 July 2004 (aged 21)
- Body discovered: 21 July 2004; Walkerville, south of Johannesburg
- Occupation: Student
- Parent(s): Rob and Sharon Matthews

Leigh Matthews (8 June 1983 – 9 July 2004) was a South African university student who was kidnapped and murdered. Her disappearance and murder sparked a media frenzy, with the ensuing investigation and court case being one of the most closely followed in South African history.

== Kidnapping and murder ==
Matthews was born on 8 July 1983 to Rob and Sharon Matthews. She had one sibling, her sister Karen. At the time of her murder, the family lived in the Johannesburg suburb of Fourways and Matthews was studying for a BCom Finance degree at Bond University in the Johannesburg suburb of Morningside. Her 21st birthday party was planned for the day after she disappeared.

On Friday 9 July 2004, she was abducted from the parking lot at Bond University. Shortly after the kidnapping, a ransom demand was made to her father, who dropped off R50,000 near the Grasmere Toll Plaza south of Johannesburg. He was able to hold a short telephone conversation with her afterwards, which was their last communication.

On 21 July 2004, her body was discovered by a municipal worker cutting grass in the open veld next to the R82 highway in Walkerville, south of Johannesburg. She had been shot four times. Although she was found naked, she had not been sexually assaulted.

== Investigation and legal proceedings ==
On 24 August 2004, police detective Superintendent Piet Byleveld took over the investigation. He identified 24-year-old Donovan Moodley as his prime suspect. Moodley was also a student at Bond University attended by Matthews, but was not acquainted with her.

On 4 October 2004, Byleveld arrested Moodley outside his home in Alberton. Moodley appeared in the Randburg Magistrate's Court on charges of murder, kidnapping and extortion. On 25 July 2005, he pleaded guilty to all three charges in the Johannesburg High Court. Judge Joop Labuschagne found him guilty as charged, but ruled he had not acted alone in his judgement.

Moodley was sentenced to life imprisonment for murder, 15 years for kidnapping and 10 years for extortion. He began serving his life sentence on 4 August 2005.

In his initial version of events, Moodley said he was driven by a need for money. He said he approached Matthews in the campus parking lot and asked her for a lift. They rode in her car together, where he then kidnapped her. Moodley said shortly after he extorted the R50,000 from her father he was unsure what to do with her, and then took her to a deserted field in Walkerville and shot her in the back of the head. He then burned his clothes to hide evidence.

Friends and family of Matthews wore white ribbons during the trial.

=== Appeals ===
Less than two weeks after sentencing, Moodley informed the Johannesburg High Court he wished to file an application for leave to appeal his sentence. He now claimed he did not kill Matthews and was framed. He withdrew this original application on 18 November 2005.

In 2006, he claimed he had not acted alone in the murder and had been framed.

On 25 November 2009, another application filed in the Johannesburg High Court for leave to appeal his sentence was dismissed by Judge Joop Labuschagne.

On 25 May 2010, his sentence was upheld by the Supreme Court of Appeal.

On 4 August 2010, an application filed in the Constitutional Court for leave to appeal his sentence was dismissed unanimously by then Chief Justice Sandile Ngcobo and the other ten judges of the Constitutional Court.

On 1 February 2012, an application filed in the Johannesburg High Court for his conviction to be set aside or a retrial was dismissed by Judge Joop Labuschagne.

=== Ongoing investigation ===
Piet Byleveld, the investigating officer who arrested Moodley, retired from the South African Police Service in 2010. His statement was never presented to court as Moodley pleaded guilty. He said he believed Moodley had accomplices in his biography published in 2011. A new investigating officer was appointed to the case in 2011.

== Television documentary ==
In July 2012, the murder was covered in two episodes of the M-Net Crimes Uncovered crime docu-drama television series titled "A Family's Nightmare Begins: The Leigh Matthews Story (Part 1)" and "A Web of Lies: The Leigh Matthews Story (Part 2)".

== See also ==
- List of kidnappings
- Lists of solved missing person cases
