= Ngerorod =

Ngerorod is Balinese wedding tradition also known as elopement. Ngerorod is one of the traditional Balinese marriage systems that has existed since ancient times and is still respected by the Hindu community.

== Details ==
Ngerorod marriage usually occurs when the two prospective brides and grooms love each other and agree to build a household, but their relationship is hindered by their parents, family, or society. Ngerorod is the first step of marriage that is only carried out by the will of the man and woman concerned.

Ngerorod marriage is regulated in Balinese Customary Law, Hindu Religious Law, or in customary customs. In Hinduism, ngerorod marriage is still recognized as valid.

Some of the conditions that must be met to perform a ngerorod marriage are:

- Not bound by the bonds of marriage
- No mental illness
- Meet the age requirements as per Hindu law
- The two brides and grooms do not have a close blood relationship which is prohibited according to religious provisions.
