= Etty Glazer =

South African kidnapping victim

Etty Glazer, wife of South African businessman Bernard Glazer, and her 22 month old son Sammy, were kidnapped for ransom on 30 March 1966. They were both returned safely after a ransom of ZAR 140,000 (South African Rand) was paid to the kidnappers. The kidnapper's house was quickly identified by police, and four suspects were arrested, with most of the ransom money being retrieved.

== Kidnapping ==
On the morning of 30 March 1966, Etty Glazer dropped her two daughters, Michelle (7) and Ella (5) at the Sandown Public School. On her way back about a half mile from home, she came across three men with apparent car trouble. When she stopped alongside them, one man grabbed her, while another attempted to open the passenger side door. After a brief struggle in which Mrs Glazer's lip was cut, both men entered the vehicle. When asked "What do you want of me?" "We are political refugees. We need your car, we need you too."

Mrs Glazer was manually blindfolded for the short journey to the kidnappers' house, and only once the vehicle was closed inside the garage was she allowed to see. She and son Sammy were then taken into the house, in which they were held for the rest of the time. The kidnappers then ordered her to contact Bernard, "we want £70,000 (South African pound)". As Mr Glazer was on a business trip to Swaziland, Etty contacted her mother first, and then Mr Glazer's secretary, Mr Davis. She explained that the kidnappers wanted R140,000 for her release. Mr Davis promptly set off to contact Mr Glazer en route to Swaziland.

Once contacted, Mr Glazer returned home, where Etty's mother was waiting for him. That evening he spoke to his wife, after which one of the kidnappers told him; "Mr Glazer, we want £70,000 for your son's and wife's release. If you want your wife and child alive you must pay £70,000 - and Mr Glazer, no tricks, no marked money and no police if you want your wife and child alive."

== Ransom drop ==
Mr Glazer contacted his bank manager from the Pretoria bank and arranged to withdraw the cash after hours. He arrived at the bank around 23:00, where he withdrew the R140,000 he needed. However the manager made a list of some of the banknotes' serial numbers. Later that night Mr Glazer received a phone call with instructions on the ransom money drop, where he was told to park at bus stop 50 on Corlett Drive, and wait by the public telephone booth for additional instructions. He was then told to leave the money in the unlocked vehicle and "go for a walk down the street." When he later returned to his vehicle, the money had been taken. At 2AM, he received a call where the kidnappers informed him that Etty and Sammy would be "home in half an hour."

The kidnappers then took Etty and Sammy for a drive in her own vehicle, and at some distance from where they had been held, the kidnappers exited the vehicle and left. Mrs Glazer then drove herself home.

== Police investigation ==
Because of the mysterious circumstances of the large cash withdrawal, the bank manager contacted the police. The head of the Security Police, Brigadier Hendrick van den Bergh, arrived at the Glazer home, just as Mr Glazer returned from the money drop. Mr Glazer insisted that the police do not act until his wife and child were safe.

The following day, Sergeant Jannie Nel from the South African Crime Bureau was taken to speak to Mrs Glazer. He was tasked to extract a floor plan of the house in which she had been kept. When he first met Mrs Glazer, she was still shaken, unable to respond properly, and almost a total wreck. Sergeant Nel was able to coax useful information from her, and eventually got her to draw a rough outline of the house, which was later described as "little more than an elaborate squiggle". Days later the squiggle was redrawn as a detailed floor plan.

The police had three more critical pieces of information that assisted in narrowing the search.

- At Mrs Glazer's request, a telegram was sent to Israel; it was later backtraced to the Bramley post office.
- The kidnappers bought a dummy and baby food from a Bramley pharmacy.
- Mrs Glazer estimated the house to be about two miles away from the scene of the abduction.

The floor plan was duplicated and given to 500 select policemen from Pretoria, with instruction to pose as telephone personnel and inspect the 6,000 houses with in the search area.

== Capture and trial ==
On the first day a matching house was identified. The owner, Mr Leonard Landou Levy was positively identified by Mrs Glazer as one of the kidnappers. Leonard denied his involvement, but did admit that his brother, Ephraim, and friend, Stanley Ivan Jawitz, asked to lend them his house for seven days. On the 29 March he eventually agreed to lend the two men his house for which he would be paid R10,000. Later Leonard took police to a safe deposit box, where R6,990 of the ransom money was recovered. The police also arrested his Brother Ephraim Levy in Cape Town and R58,500 more was recovered. Kenneth Levy, the third brother was also arrested, as he was also implicated in the kidnapping.

While being questioned by police in an apartment block in Berea, Johannesburg, Stanley Jawitz committed suicide by jumping from the top. The next day, 13 April, police recovered a further R60,000 in a safe deposit box in Stanley Jawitz name.

On 1 June 1966, the trial of Ephraim, Leonard, and Kenneth Levy began at the Rand Supreme Court in front of Justice Hiemstra. They were each charged with kidnapping and child stealing. Each pleaded not guilty, but Ephraim changed his plea to guilty on the second day of trial. On 10 June, Justice Hiemstra convicted all three brothers on the charge of kidnapping and sentenced each to imprisonment: Ephraim, 16 years; Kenneth, 6 years; and Leonard, 5 years.

Kenneth Levy maintained his innocence, despite the fact that he drove the car that was used in the abduction. He claimed that he was not involved: "I was recovering from a motor-car accident at the time, I had sustained serious head injuries and had suffered brain haemorrhage...I did not even know my own name...how on earth could I have known that I was being drawn into a kidnapping?" Justice Hiemstra was convinced of Kenneth Levy's guilt: "You [Kenneth] were an active participant to a greater extent than your brother Leonard. You were on the scene of the kidnapping and knew what was going on. You saw fit to deny that you knew anything about it and by so doing forfeited much of the compassion one could have had for you in your present predicament."

Bernard Glazer instituted a civil case against Kenneth Levy, and in June 1967, the Rand Supreme Court ordered Kenneth to pay Glazer R2,500. Ephraim and Leonard Levy were exonerated from liability.

== Historical context ==
The ransom of R140,000 which was paid was four times as much as the US$50,000 paid in the famous Lindbergh kidnapping, which at the time was the highest ransom demand in the world.

John Vorster, the Minister of Justice, issued a special statement: "The full story of the investigation reads like a work of fiction. If there is a detective force in the world that can do better, I should like to hear of it."

== See also ==
- List of kidnappings
- Lists of solved missing person cases
