= Morningside, Gauteng =

Morningside
- Location within Gauteng Location within South Africa
- Coordinates: 26.0782°S 28.0625°E
- Country: South Africa
- Province: Gauteng
- Municipality: City of Johannesburg
- Main Place: Sandton
- Established: 1950

Area
  - Total: 6.24 km^{2} (2.41 sq mi)

Population (2011)
  - Total: 15,723
  - Density: 2,520/km^{2} (6,530/sq mi)

Racial makeup (2011)
  - Black African: 28.6%
  - Coloured: 2.2%
  - Indian/Asian: 18.1%
  - White: 48.2%
  - Other: 2.9%

First languages (2011)
  - English: 65.9%
  - Afrikaans: 5.7%
  - Zulu: 4.3%
  - Tswana: 2.4%
  - Other: 21.6%
- Time zone: UTC+2 (SAST)
- Postal code (street): 2196
- PO box: 2057

Morningside is a commercial and residential suburb of Sandton, South Africa, located in Region E of the City of Johannesburg Metropolitan Municipality. As a part of the former Sandton municipality, it constitutes many affluent residential areas as well as small and medium business enterprises, clinics, schools, hotels and shopping centres.

== History ==
The suburb is situated on part of an old Witwatersrand farm called Zandfontein. It was established on 8 March 1950. The suburb may be named for a suburb of the same name in southern Edinburgh, Scotland, UK. It has been home to Bet David (previously Temple David), a Progressive Jewish congregation since the 1970s.
