= Sex trafficking in Kyrgyzstan =

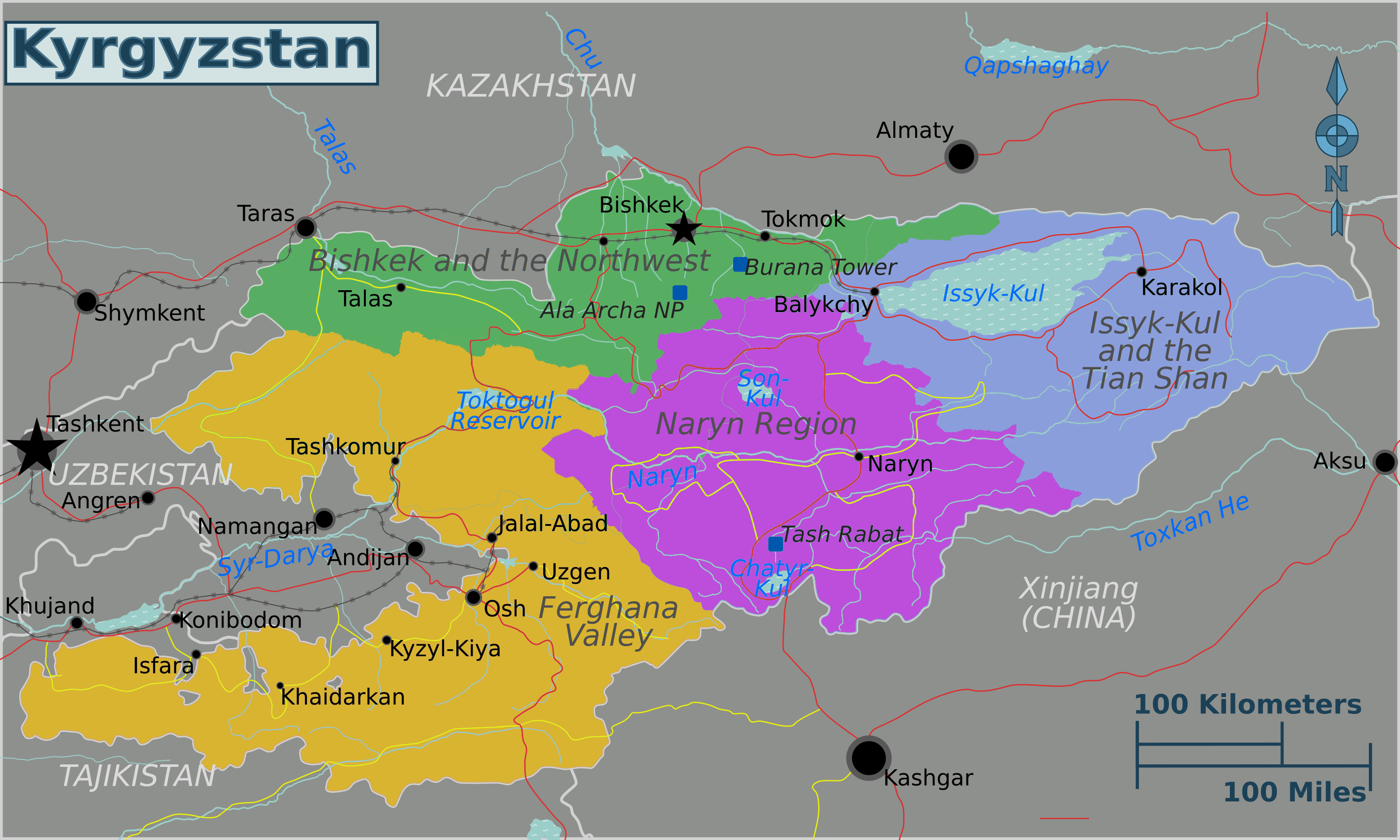
Kyrgyzstan citizen and foreign victims are sex trafficked into and out of the regions of Kyrgyzstan. They are raped and physically and psychologically harmed in brothels, businesses, homes, hotel rooms, nightclubs, and other locations within these administrative divisions.

Sex trafficking in Kyrgyzstan is human trafficking for the purpose of sexual exploitation and slavery that occurs in the Kyrgyz Republic.

Sex trafficking victims, primarily women and girls, in the country are from all ethnic groups in Kyrgyzstan and foreigners. Victims are trafficked within Kyrgyzstan and to other countries in Asia and different continents. Children, persons in poverty, and migrants are particularly vulnerable to sex trafficking. Victims are abducted, deceived, threatened, and or forced into prostitution and marriages. Their passports and other documents are often taken. They suffer from physical and psychological abuse and trauma and are typically guarded and or locked up in poor conditions. A number contract sexually transmitted diseases from rapes. Sometimes their family members are threatened.

The government of Kyrgyzstan has been criticized for its inadequate anti-sex trafficking efforts and victim protection services. Corruption is a problem and officials and police have been complicit in sex trafficking.

== Bride kidnappings ==
Non-consensual bride kidnappings, in which women and girls are forced into marriages and pregnancies through societal pressure, intimation, or violence, is a form of sex trafficking in Kyrgyzstan.
