= Aqsaqal =

Elderly men in the Turkish society

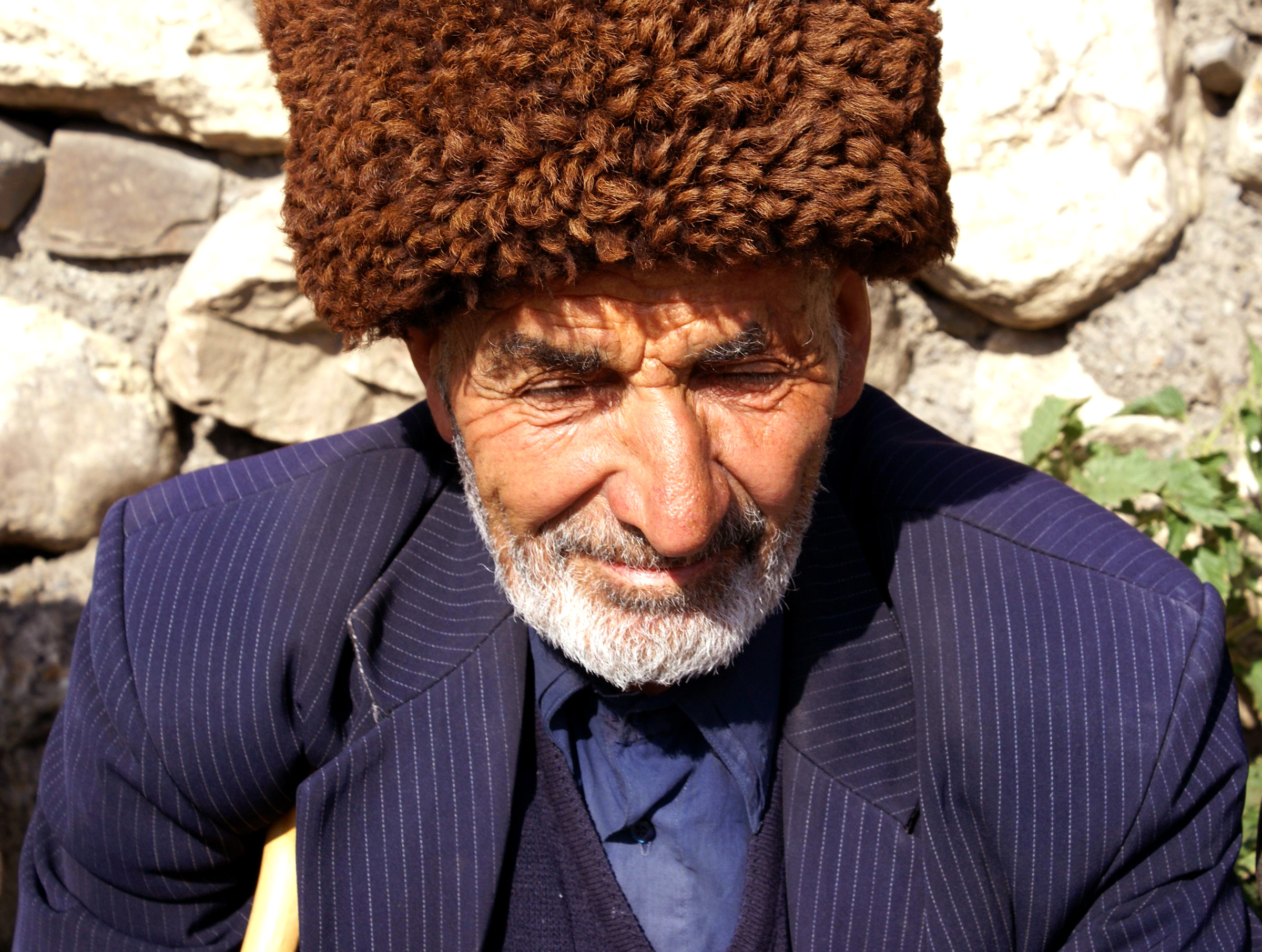
An aqsaqal from Khinalug

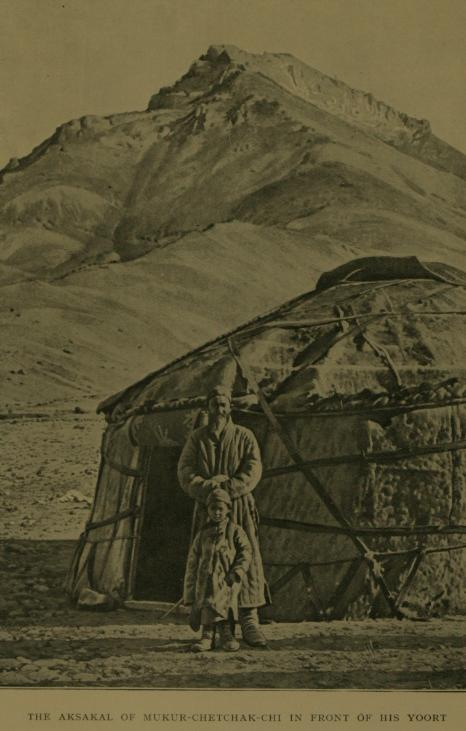
Aqsaqal near a yurt

Aqsaqal or aksakal (literally meaning "white beard" in Turkic languages) refers to the patriarch of communities in Central Asia, the Caucasus and the Volga. Traditionally, an aqsaqal is the leader of a village or aul, and is in charge of all matters relating to customary law. Acting as advisors or judges, these elders have or had a role in politics and the justice system in countries and tribes for centuries. Recently, there have been distinct aksakal courts established in Kyrgyzstan. In Uzbekistan, which has traditionally been a more urban society (the Uzbeks being sarts or town-dwellers, as opposed to Yörüks), cities are divided up into mahallas. Each mahalla has an aqsaqal who acts as the district leader.

== Redevelopment of the aqsaqal courts in Kyrgyzstan ==
In 1995, then-President of Kyrgyzstan Askar Akayev announced a decree to revitalize the aqsaqal courts. The courts would have jurisdiction over property, torts and family law. The aqsaqal courts were eventually included under Article 92 of the Kyrgyz constitution. As of 2006, there were approximately 1,000 aqsaqal courts throughout Kyrgyzstan, including in the capital of Bishkek. Akaev linked the development of these courts to the rekindling of Kyrgyz national identity. In a 2005 speech, he connected the courts back to the country's nomadic past and extolled how the courts expressed the Kyrgyz ability of self-governance.

== See also ==
- Customary law
