= Lily of the Nile =

Lily of the Nile is a common name for several plants and may refer to:

- Agapanthus africanus
- Agapanthus praecox
- Zantedeschia aethiopica

== See also ==
- Nymphaea nouchali var. caerulea, also called Sacred narcotic lily of the Nile and sacred blue lily of the Nile
