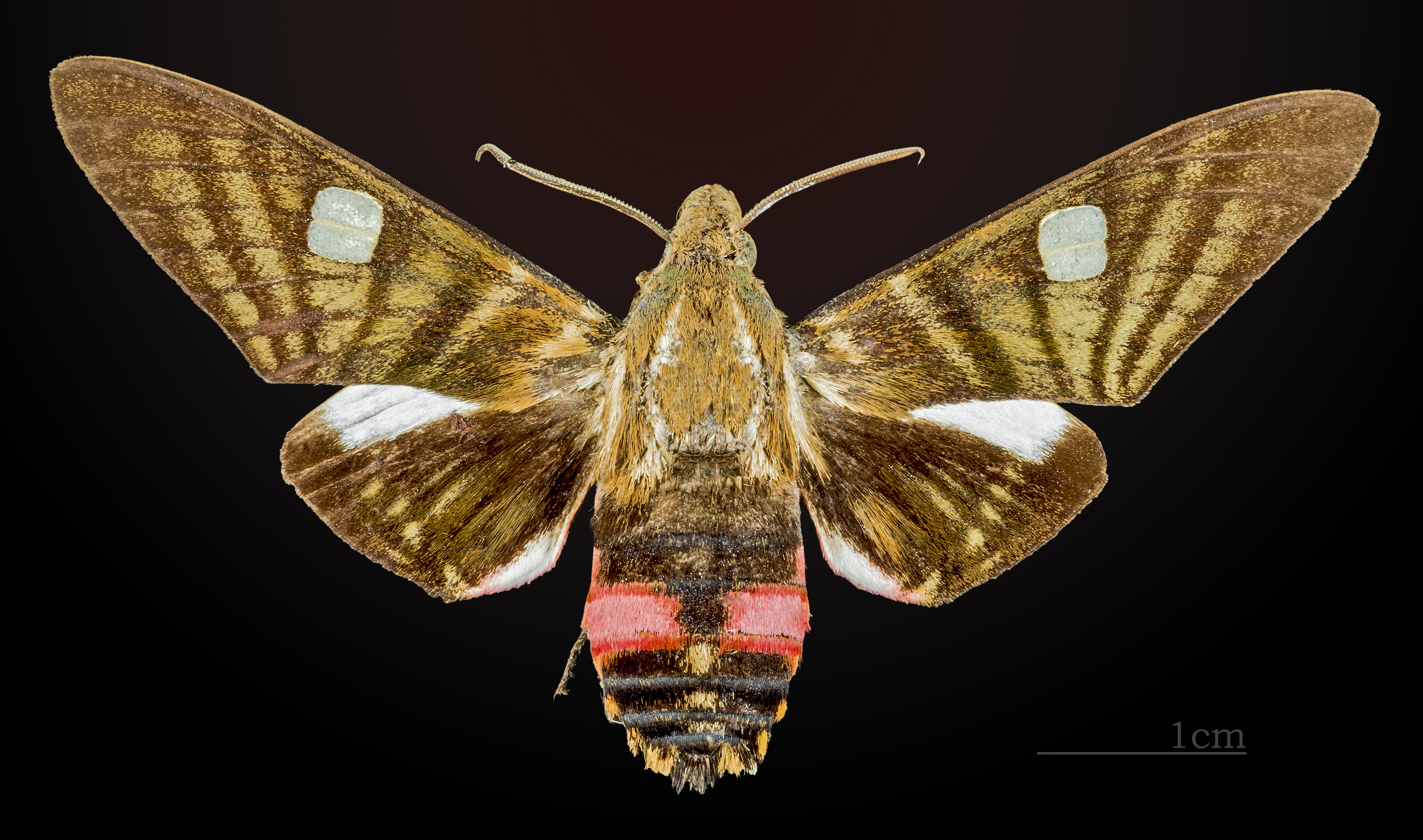
- Dorsal view
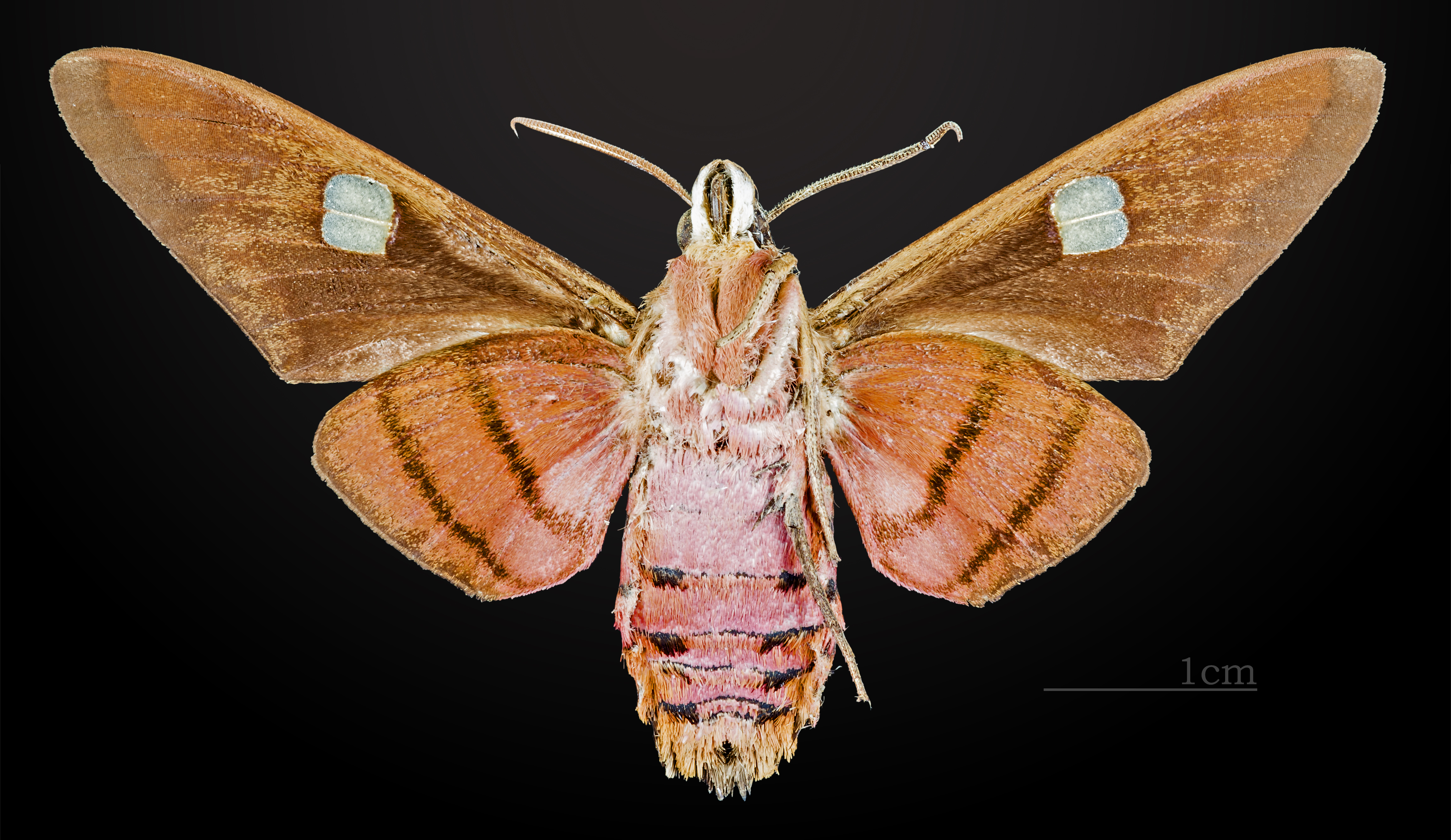
- Ventral view

Scientific classification
- Domain: Eukaryota
- Kingdom: Animalia
- Phylum: Arthropoda
- Class: Insecta
- Order: Lepidoptera
- Family: Sphingidae
- Genus: Hayesiana
- Species: H. triopus

Binomial name
- Hayesiana triopus (Westwood, 1847)

Synonyms
- Macroglossa triopus Westwood, 1847

= Hayesiana triopus =

Species of moth

Hayesiana triopus, the nonsuch hawkmoth, is a moth of the family Sphingidae. It is known from Nepal, north-eastern India, southern China and Thailand.

The wingspan is 64–78 mm. The metanotum is dark brown with creamy-white stripes. The abdomen upperside is black with an interrupted belt of red and lateral orange spots. The underside of the thorax and abdomen is reddish orange. The forewing upperside is dark grey green with six narrow transverse blackish bands. The discal spot is large, rectangular and translucent. The hindwing upperside is black with a conspicuous white costal patch and tornal area. The hindwing underside is reddish orange.

It is a diurnal species with a fast but bumbling flight. Adults are attracted to the flowers of Agapanthus africanus in Hong Kong.

The larvae have been recorded feeding on Adina globiflora in India.
