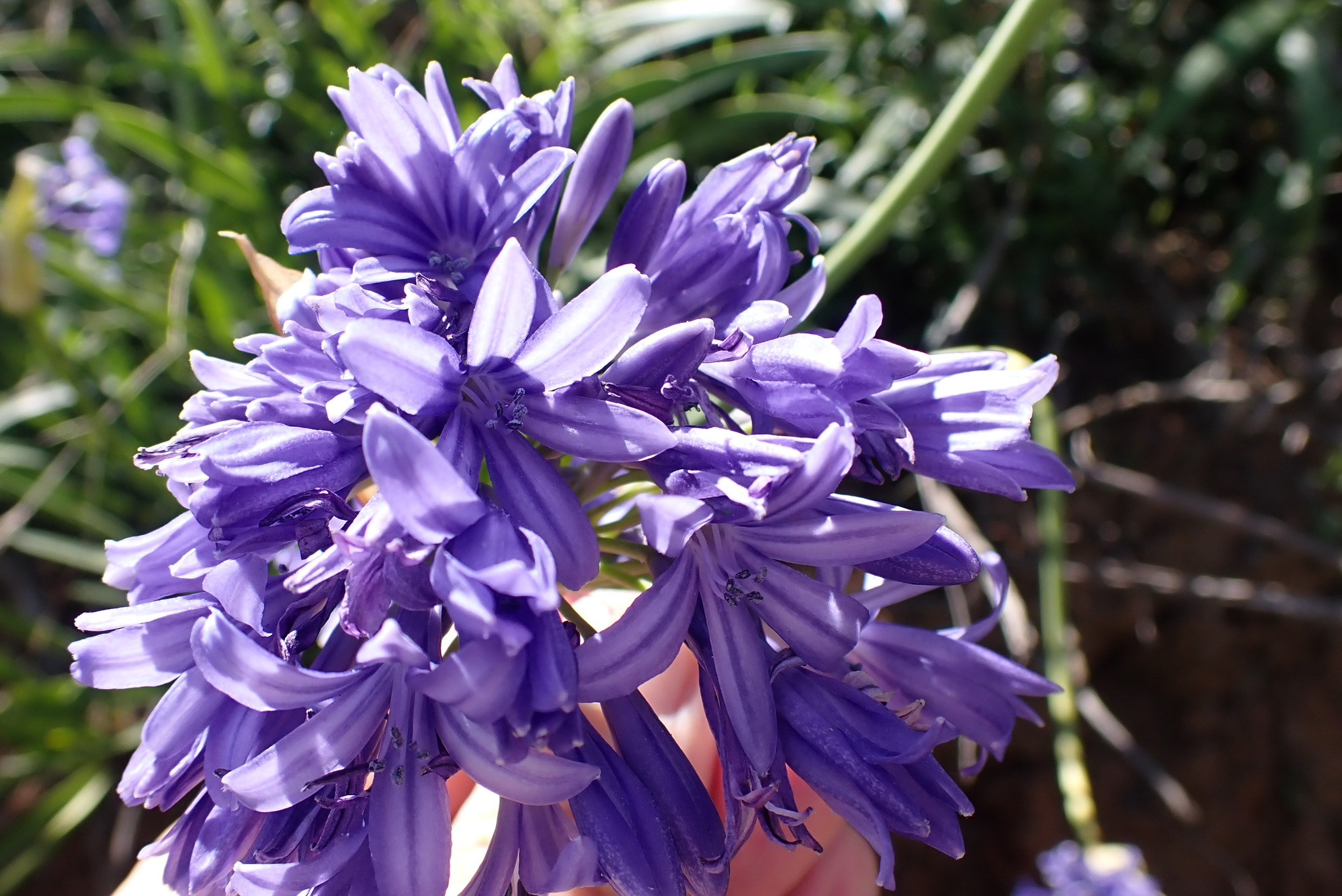

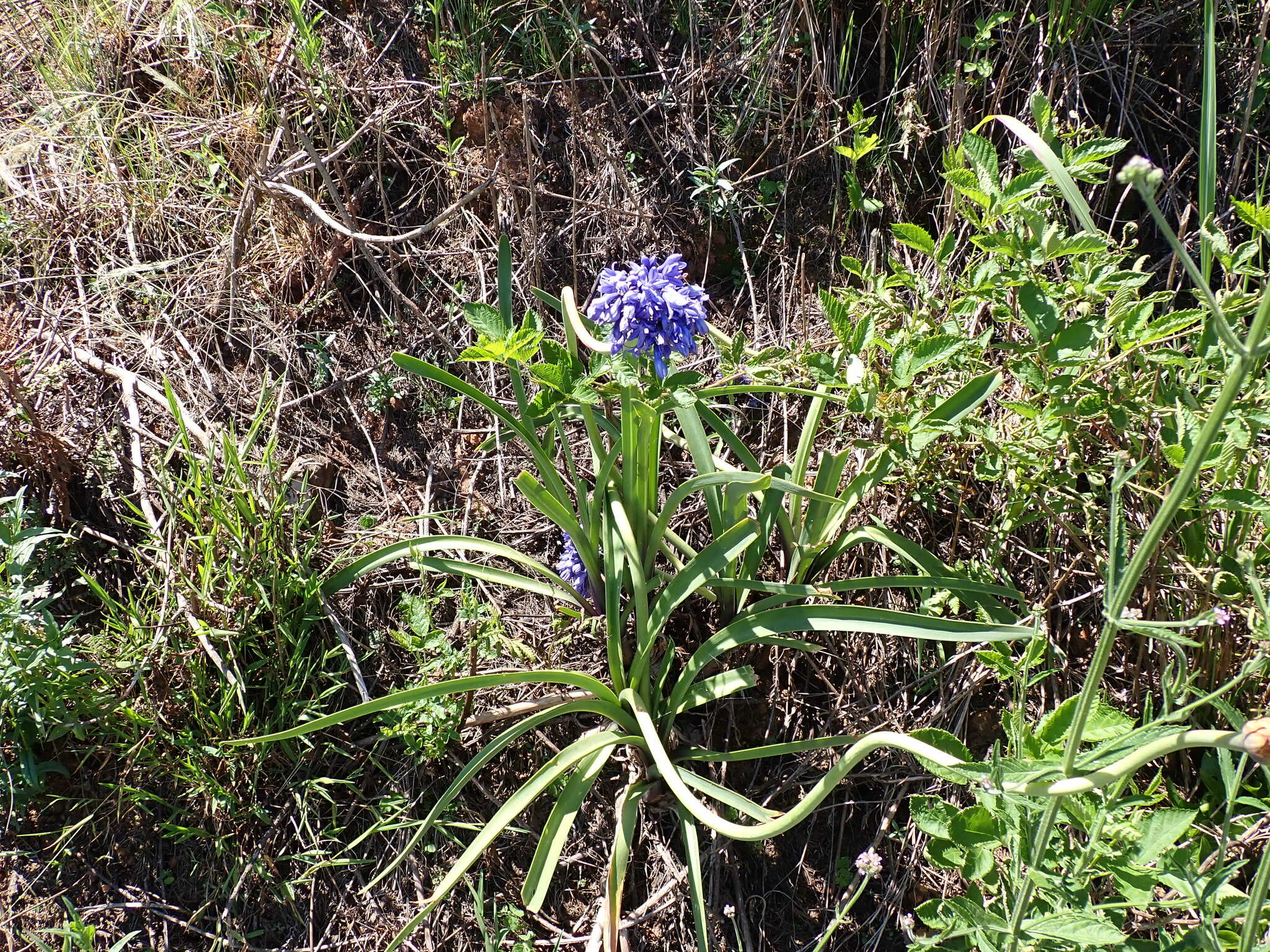

Scientific classification
- Kingdom: Plantae
- Clade: Tracheophytes
- Clade: Angiosperms
- Clade: Monocots
- Order: Asparagales
- Family: Amaryllidaceae
- Subfamily: Agapanthoideae
- Genus: Agapanthus
- Species: A. caulescens

Binomial name
- Agapanthus caulescens Spreng.

= Agapanthus caulescens =

Species of flowering plant endemic to Southern Africa

Agapanthus caulescens, the stem agapanthus, is a species of flowering plant in the family Amaryllidaceae. Its three subspecies are found in Eswatini and eastern South Africa.

== Distribution ==
Three subspecies are found in Eswatini and eastern South Africa:

- A. caulescens subsp. caulescens only occurs in Swaziland.
- A. caulescens subsp. angustifolius occurs in Swaziland and Kwazulu-Natal and Mpumalanga.
- A. caulescens subsp. gracilis occurs in Kwazulu-Natal and in the Limpopo province.

== Habitat ==
Agapanthus caulescens prefers open grassland and is found in-between rocks.

== Conservation status ==
A. c. gracilis has been classified as least concern by SANBI due to its stable population.

== Taxonomy ==
Agapanthus caulescens contains the following subspecies:

- Agapanthus caulescens Spreng. caulescens
- Agapanthus caulescens Spreng. angustifolius F.M.Leight.
- Agapanthus caulescens Spreng. gracilis (F.M.Leight.) F.M.Leight.
