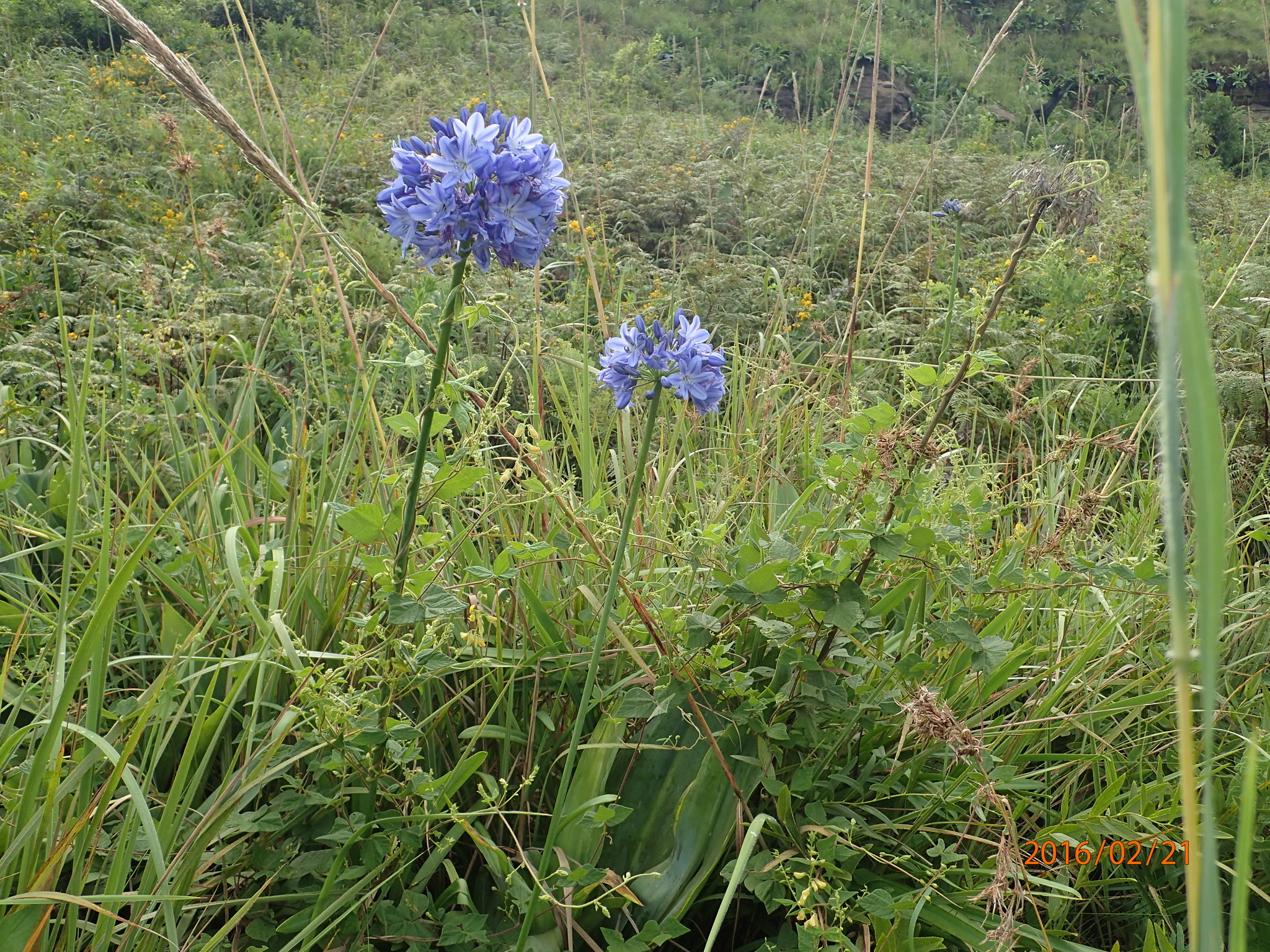

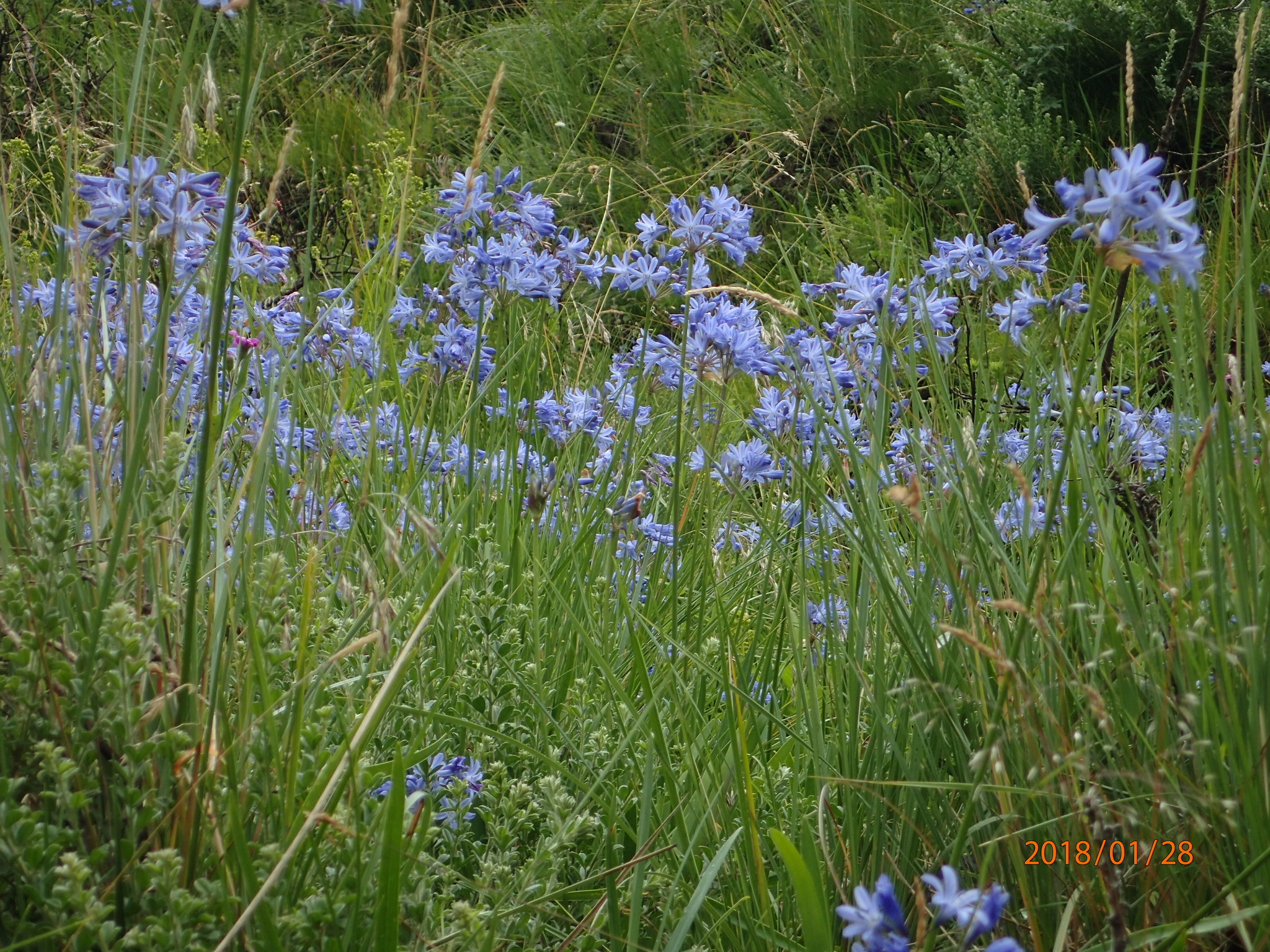

Conservation status
- Least Concern (SANBI Red List)

Scientific classification
- Kingdom: Plantae
- Clade: Tracheophytes
- Clade: Angiosperms
- Clade: Monocots
- Order: Asparagales
- Family: Amaryllidaceae
- Subfamily: Agapanthoideae
- Genus: Agapanthus
- Species: A. campanulatus

Binomial name
- Agapanthus campanulatus F.M.Leight.

= Agapanthus campanulatus =

Species of flowering plant endemic to Southern Africa

Agapanthus campanulatus, the bell agapanthus, is a species of flowering plant in the family Amaryllidaceae endemic to the Drakensberg in Southern Africa.

== Distribution ==
Agapanthus campanulatus is found in the Drakensberg at a maximum altitude of 2400 m. It's found in moist grassland and rocky slopes in the Eastern Cape, Lesotho, KwaZulu-Natal, Gauteng and Mpumalanga. A. c. campanulatus is found at lower altitudes in the midlands of KwaZulu-Natal, the Eastern Cape and the Free State.

== Conservation status ==
Both subspecies of A. campanulatus have been classified as least concern in the Red List of South African Plants.

== Taxonomy ==
Agapanthus campanulatus contains two subspecies:

- Agapanthus campanulatus F.M.Leight. campanulatus
- Agapanthus campanulatus F.M.Leight. patens (F.M.Leight.) F.M.Leight.
