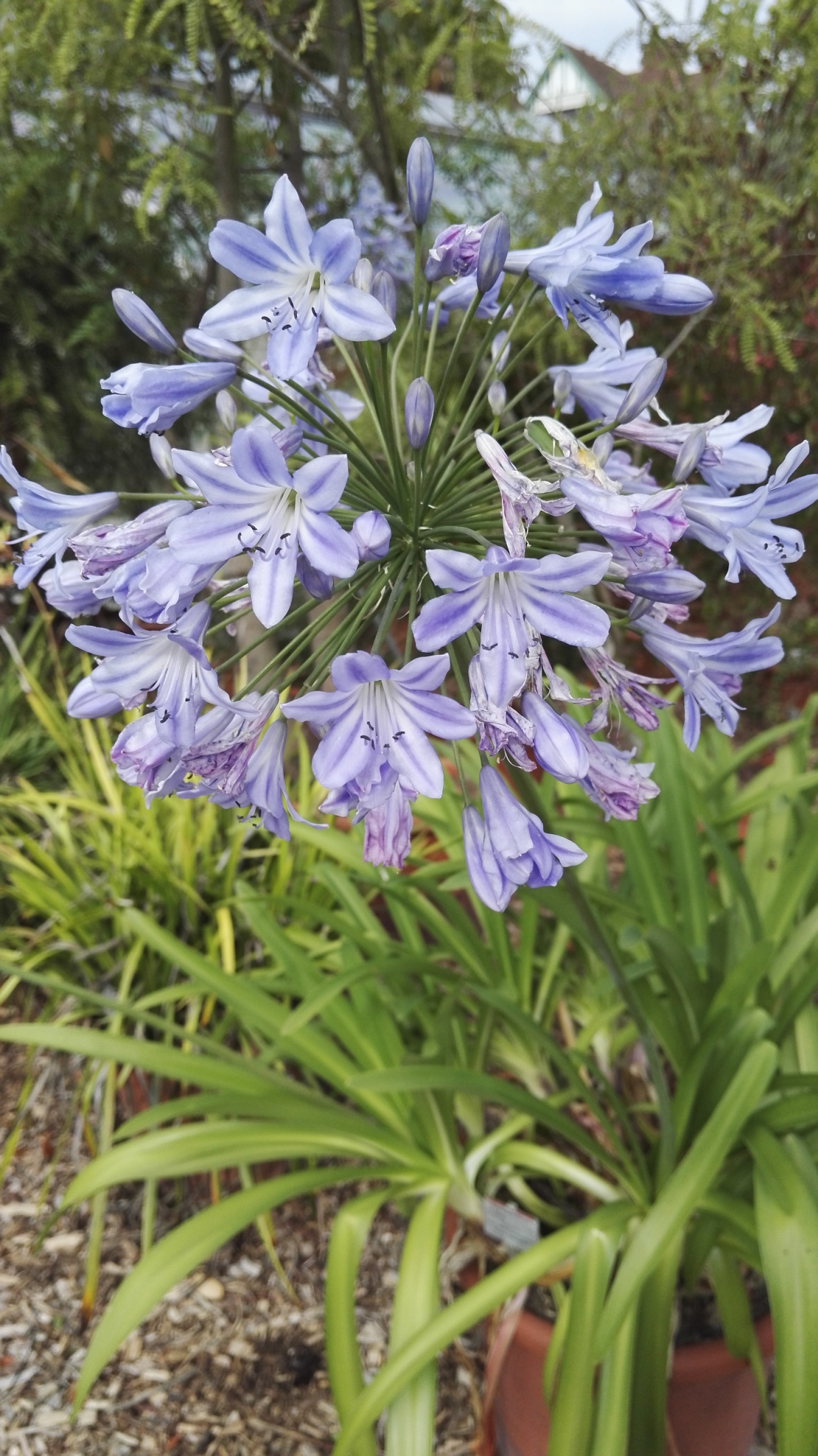

Scientific classification
- Kingdom: Plantae
- Clade: Tracheophytes
- Clade: Angiosperms
- Clade: Monocots
- Order: Asparagales
- Family: Amaryllidaceae
- Subfamily: Agapanthoideae
- Genus: Agapanthus
- Species: A. coddii

Binomial name
- Agapanthus coddii F.M.Leight.

= Agapanthus coddii =

Species of flowering plant endemic to South Africa

Agapanthus coddii, the Waterberg agapanthus or Codd's agapanthus (Afrikaans: Waterberg-bloulelie, lit. 'Waterberg blue lily'), is a rare flowering plant in the family Amaryllidaceae restricted to the western Waterberg around the Marakele National Park.

== Distribution ==
Agapanthus coddii is found within a small area of the Waterberg massif in Limpopo, with an extent of occurrence of 160km^{2}.

== Habitat and ecology ==
Agapanthus coddii is found in moist environments beneath cliffs in Bushveld habitats.

== Conservation status ==
Agapanthus coddii has been classified as rare by SANBI in the Red List of South African Plants due to its restricted range.
