= The Transformation of Virginia, 1740–1790 =

1982 nonfiction book by Rhys Isaac

- Author: Rhys Isaac
- Genre: history
- Publisher: University of North Carolina Press
- Publication date: 1982
- Publication place: United States
- Pages: 462
- Awards: Pulitzer Prize for History (1983)
- ISBN: 978-0807848142

The Transformation of Virginia, 1740–1790 is a 1982 nonfiction book by Australian historian Rhys Isaac, published by the University of North Carolina Press. The book describes the religious and political changes over a half-century of Virginian history, particularly the shift from "the great cultural metaphor of patriarchy" to a greater emphasis on communalism. In this Pulitzer Prize-winning book, Rhys Isaac chronicles dramatic confrontations with the use of many “observational techniques of the cultural anthropologist." Isaac historically recreates and dissects Virginian society when moments of profound changes were taking place. This book is said to be a landmark of cultural history and “has inspired many subsequent historians to incorporate ethnography into their methods of inquiry." Isaac's account of Virginia's historical transformation provides avid descriptions of “Virginia’s social life and customs." Many of the book's original reviewers questioned the absence of “innovative studies of early American religious life" in The Transformation of Virginia. Some reviewers claim that Isaac's “treatment of causality in Virginia history remains The Transformation of Virginia's central weakness."

== Background ==
The Transformation of Virginia describes the early establishment of the English in Virginia and the activities they carried out. The first part of the book introduces the reader to natural and physical structures of the elites' dominance in eighteenth-century Virginia. Rhys begins in 1740 with a description of how Virginia's aristocracy showed their claim on the landscape through “stately English-designed great houses, imposing county courthouses, and elegant parish churches." They constructed their place in the social hierarchy by “being owners of land and lords of labor." The English arrived at the colony of Virginia and “lodged among the early inhabitants" and started accumulating wealth. Rhys explains that the evolution of the Virginia colony began by planting and harvesting a drug plant, the sot-weed, tobacco. Isaac describes how tobacco growing and processing dominated Virginia's economy allowing them to gain great wealth. From being a raw settlement, the development of social order characterized Virginia as an established province. The book describes how Virginia's social world was challenged by evangelical counterculture. The antislavery preaching of some extreme leaders and the subversive practice of admitting black slaves into full church fellowship resulted in cultural conflicts.

== Thesis ==
Isaac targets the Great Awakening by examining the shift from a rigid colonial structure towards the Revolution's egalitarian rhetoric in The Transformation of Virginia. The first signs of change came in the 1740s when church attendance dropped and people began reading religious tracts on their own. This resulted in divisions between the clergy and Virginians and the breakdown of old hierarchical ways. These new sects had little use for the old hierarchical ways, and became popular amongst slaves. Attempts by upper class religious authorities to repress these religious movements only further instigated colonists. These dissenters became more and more distrusting of colonial and British authority which led to the idea of a revolution. Isaac argues this made “the arguments of revolution more persuasive to them." Lower class Virginians were not willing to pay taxes to a state-supervised church that was considered to be corrupt and pay the controversial revenue taxes imposed by Parliament. The refusal to pay taxes reduced Anglican influence which is based on social standing or aristocratic lineage. According to Isaac, some of the more extreme revivalists, particularly among the Baptists, even questioned slavery. The conversion of slaves challenged traditional ways of life.

== Historical significance ==
The Transformation of Virginia describes moments of profound change in Virginia's history. Rhys traces the evolution of Virginian society by illustrating a timeline of events. The book is divided into three sections. In the first, “Traditional Ways of Life," Isaac describes eighteenth century Virginia as a society where all whites belonged to one community, and both civil and religious authority were important in establishing an individual's position in society. The second section, “Movements and Events," illustrates the rise of this “counterculture" of evangelical Christianity and the role that it played in breaking down the hierarchical social structure. The final section, “Afterview," presents Virginia's social world after experiencing change. Rhys describes the changing role of African Americans in Virginian society that resulted in the degradation of social structure. This book traces the historical transformation of Virginia from a communitarian system to an individualistic one.

== Awards ==
In 1983, Rhys Isaac won the Pulitzer Prize for History for the book. He remains the only Australian historian ever to win a Pulitzer Prize.
