= Glynn Isaac =

South African archeologist (1937–1985)

Glynn Llywelyn Isaac
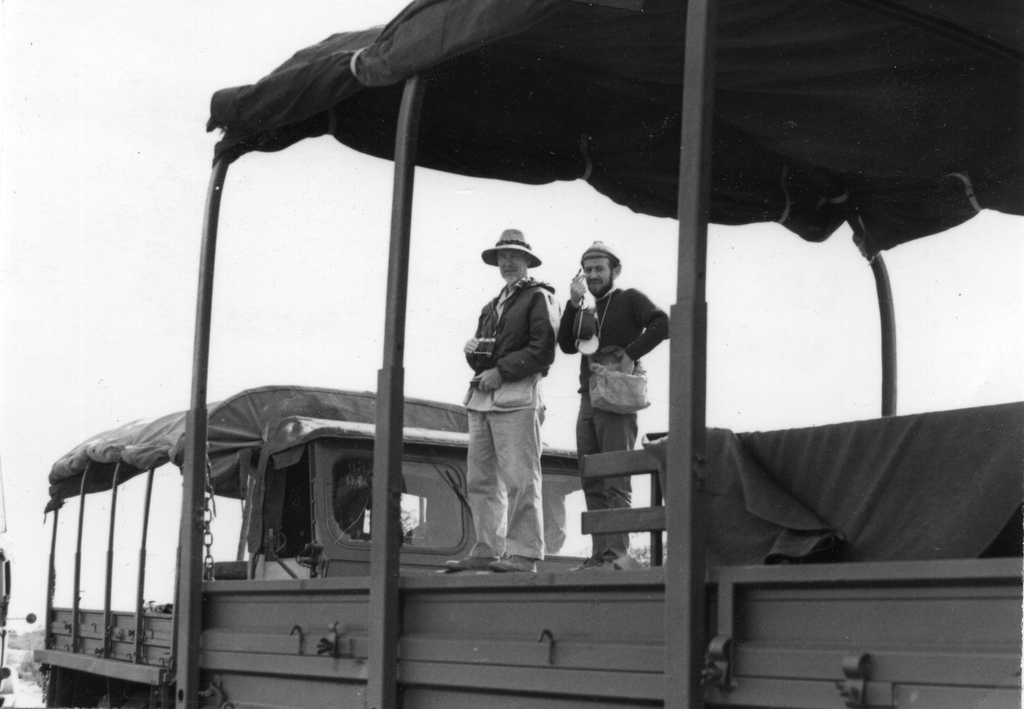
- Isaac (right) with J. Desmond Clark in 1967
- Born: 19 November 1937
- Died: 5 October 1985 (aged 47); Yokosuka, Japan
- Education: University of Cape Town; Peterhouse, Cambridge
- Scientific career
- Fields: archaeologist
- Workplaces: Harvard University; University of California, Berkeley

Glynn Llywelyn Isaac (19 November 1937 – 5 October 1985) was a South African archaeologist who specialised in the very early prehistory of Africa, and was one of twin sons born to botanists William Edwyn Isaac and Frances Margaret Leighton. He has been called the most influential Africanist of the last half century, and his papers on human movement and behavior are still cited in studies a quarter of a century later.

== Biography ==
He took his first degree from the University of Cape Town in 1958 before studying for his PhD at Peterhouse, Cambridge which he completed in 1969. He was also Warden for Prehistoric Sites in Kenya between 1961 and 1962 and deputy director of the Centre for Prehistory and Palaeontology at the National Museums of Kenya from 1963 to 1965. Working with Richard Leakey, he was co-director of the East African Koobi Fora project.

In 1966 he joined the anthropology department at the University of California, Berkeley and in 1983 he was appointed Professor of Anthropology at Harvard University where he was developing new research projects at the time of his death. He was survived by his twin brother, Rhys Isaac, an historian, based at La Trobe University.

He died in 1985 in Yokosuka, Japan due to illness, at the age of 47.

== Contributions ==
Glynn Isaac is best remembered for a series of papers and ideas which attempted to combine the available archeological record with models of both human behavior and a human activity from the standpoint of evolution. In the early 1970s Isaac published on the effect of social networks, gathering, meat eating and other factors on human evolution, and proposed a series of models to examine how groups of humans in the Paleolithic would have engaged in acquiring the necessities of life, and interacting with each other. Isaac's models focused on a "home base" and the importance of sexual division of labor on hominid social organization.

=== Works ===
- The Archaeology of Human Origins, Cambridge University Press.
- Olorgesailie: Archaeological Studies of the Middle Lake Basin in Kenya, University of Chicago Press, 1977.
- The food-sharing behavior of protohuman hominids. Scientific American 238:90-108, 1978.
- Koobi Fora Research Project: Plio-Pleistocene Archaeology, Glynn Ll. Isaac (Editor), et al., Clarendon Press, 1997.
- Human Origins: Louis Leakey and the East African Evidence, Glynn Ll. Isaac, Elizabeth Richards McCown, WA Benjamin, 1976.

== See also ==
- Human evolution
- Olorgesailie
- Koobi Fora
- David Pilbeam
