= Rhys Isaac =

American historian

Rhys Llywelyn Isaac (20 November 1937 – 6 October 2010) was a South African-born Australian historian of American history who also worked in the United States.

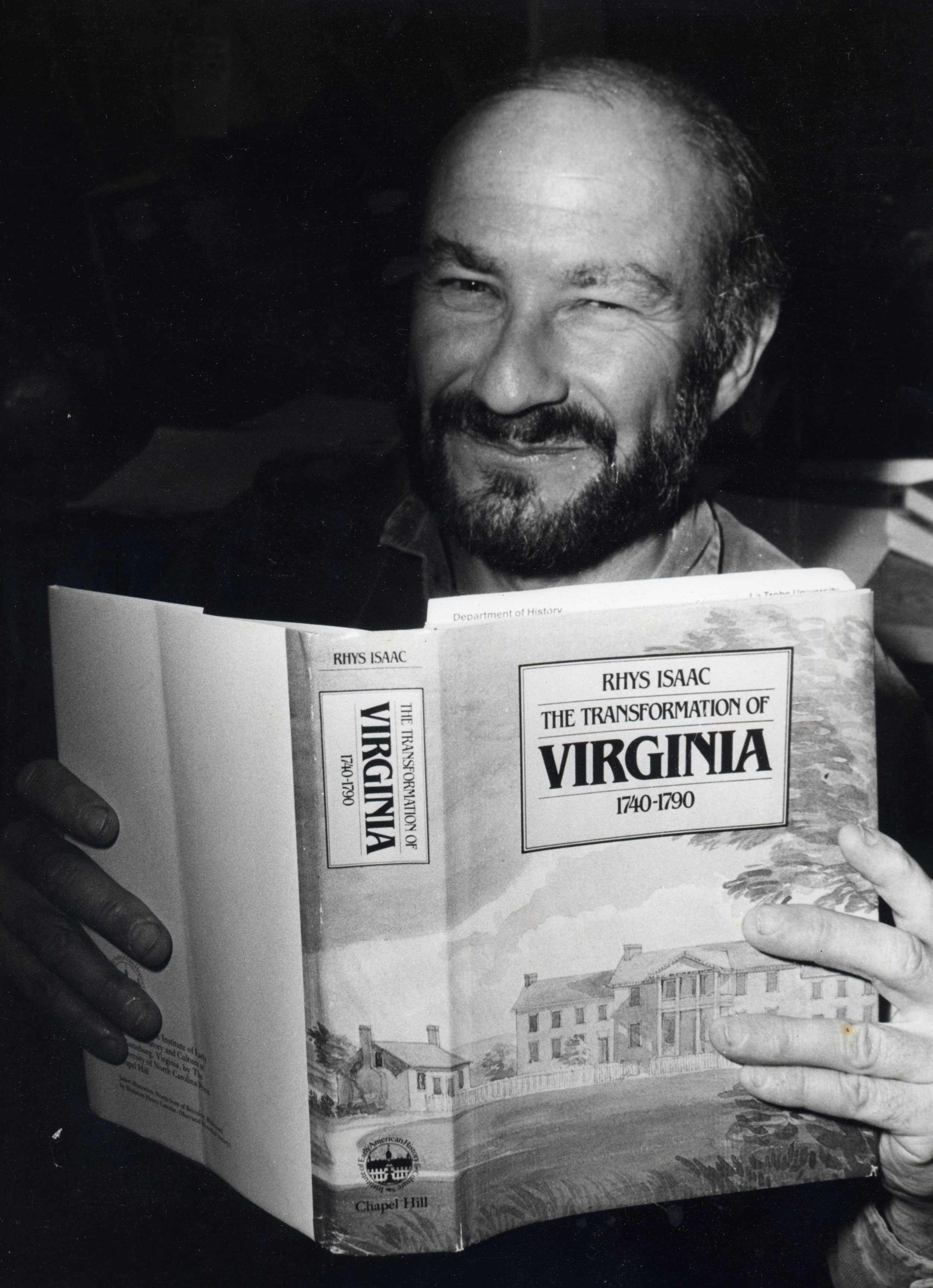
Rhys Isaac with book 1983

Isaac and his twin brother Glynn were born in Cape Town, South Africa, to William Edwyn Isaac and Frances Margaret Leighton, both professional botanists.

Isaac earned his B.A. and M.A. degrees from the University of Cape Town. In 1959 he was the Cape Province Rhodes Scholar at Balliol College (Oxford), earning his Ph.D. in 1962.

In 1963 Isaac emigrated to Australia, where he taught at the University of Melbourne, and later at La Trobe University (1971–91), where he was emeritus professor of American history. In 1975 he was a distinguished visiting professor of early American history at the College of William & Mary in Williamsburg, Virginia.

Isaac won the 1983 Pulitzer Prize for History for his book The Transformation of Virginia, 1740-1790 (1982), becoming the first and only Australian historian to win a Pulitzer Prize.

In 2004 Isaac published Landon Carter's Uneasy Kingdom: Revolution and Rebellion on a Virginia Plantation, which made use of the exemplary diary of a Virginian landholder and member of the House of Burgesses.

== Death ==
Isaac died at his home in Blairgowrie, Victoria, Australia, on 6 October 2010, aged 72, from cancer.
