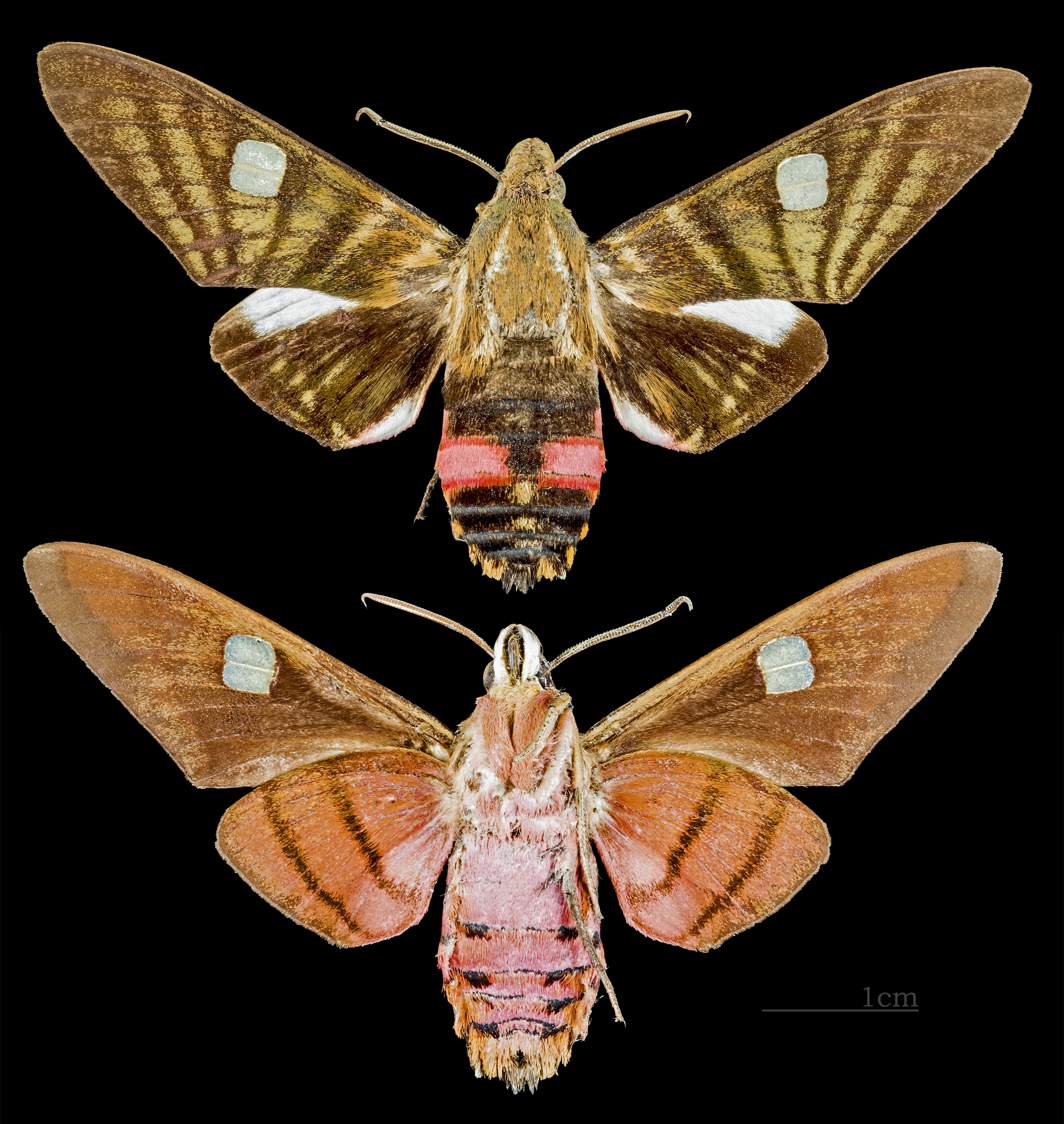
- Hayesiana triopus

Scientific classification
- Kingdom: Animalia
- Phylum: Arthropoda
- Class: Insecta
- Order: Lepidoptera
- Family: Sphingidae
- Subtribe: Macroglossina
- Genus: Hayesiana; D. S. Fletcher, 1982

Species
- See text

Synonyms
- Rhodosoma Butler, 1876

= Hayesiana =

Genus of moths

Hayesiana is a genus of moths in the family Sphingidae. It was described by David Stephen Fletcher in 1982.

== Species ==
- Hayesiana farintaenia Zhu & Wang, 1997
- Hayesiana triopus (Westwood, 1847)
