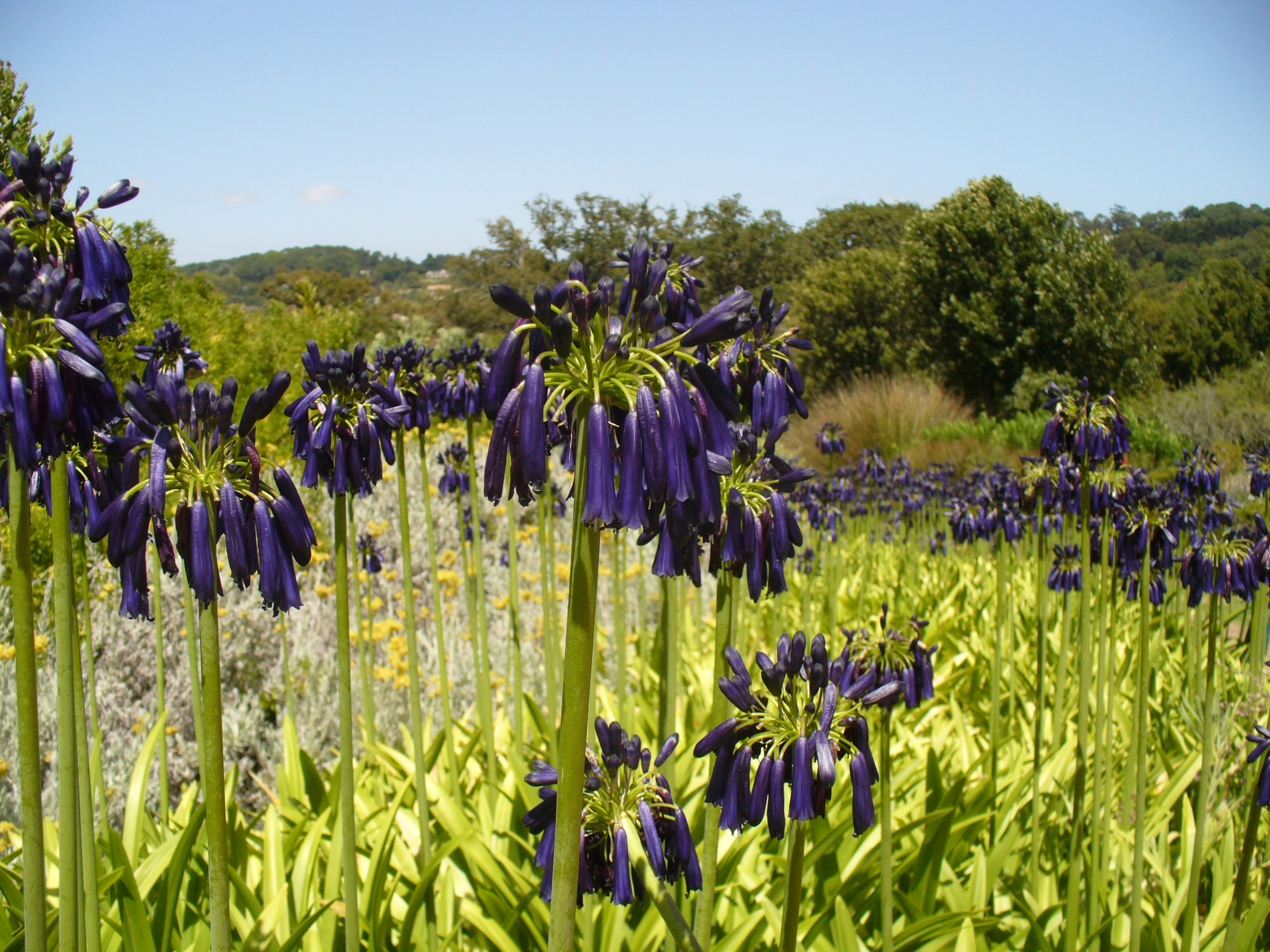
- Agapanthus inapertus subsp. pendulus

Scientific classification
- Kingdom: Plantae
- Clade: Tracheophytes
- Clade: Angiosperms
- Clade: Monocots
- Order: Asparagales
- Family: Amaryllidaceae
- Subfamily: Agapanthoideae
- Genus: Agapanthus
- Species: A. inapertus

Binomial name
- Agapanthus inapertus Beauverd

= Agapanthus inapertus =

Species of flowering plant

Agapanthus inapertus, the Drakensberg agapanthus, drooping agapanthus, or closed African lily, is a species of flowering plant in the family Amaryllidaceae, native to open grasslands, forest margins and mountainous, rocky areas of Mozambique, Eswatini (Swaziland), and South Africa (Transvaal and Natal).

== Description ==
Growing to 1.5 m (4.9 ft), this herbaceous perennial produces umbels of flowers in shades of deep blue, in late Summer. The individual flowers remain barely open. It is a popular garden plant, The cultivar A. inapertus subsp. hollandii 'Sky' has an attractive drooping habit, and has received the Royal Horticultural Society's Award of Garden Merit.

== Subspecies ==
- Agapanthus inapertus subsp. hollandii (F.M.Leight.) F.M.Leight.
- Agapanthus inapertus subsp. intermedius F.M.Leight.
- Agapanthus inapertus subsp. pendulus (L.Bolus) F.M.Leight.
