= Hayesiana farintaenia =

Scientific classification
- Domain: Eukaryota
- Kingdom: Animalia
- Phylum: Arthropoda
- Class: Insecta
- Order: Lepidoptera
- Family: Sphingidae
- Genus: Hayesiana
- Species: H. farintaenia

Binomial name
- Hayesiana farintaenia (Zhu & Wang, 1997)

Synonyms
- Rhodosoma farintaenia Zhu & Wang, 1997; Schausanus barnesi Clark, 1939

Species of moth

Hayesiana farintaenia is a moth of the family Sphingidae. It is known from eastern China. This species was known for many years by an unpublished manuscript name "Schausanus barnesi", with two specimens in the Carnegie Museum of Natural History. This name has been superseded by the newly published name Hayesiana farintaenia.
