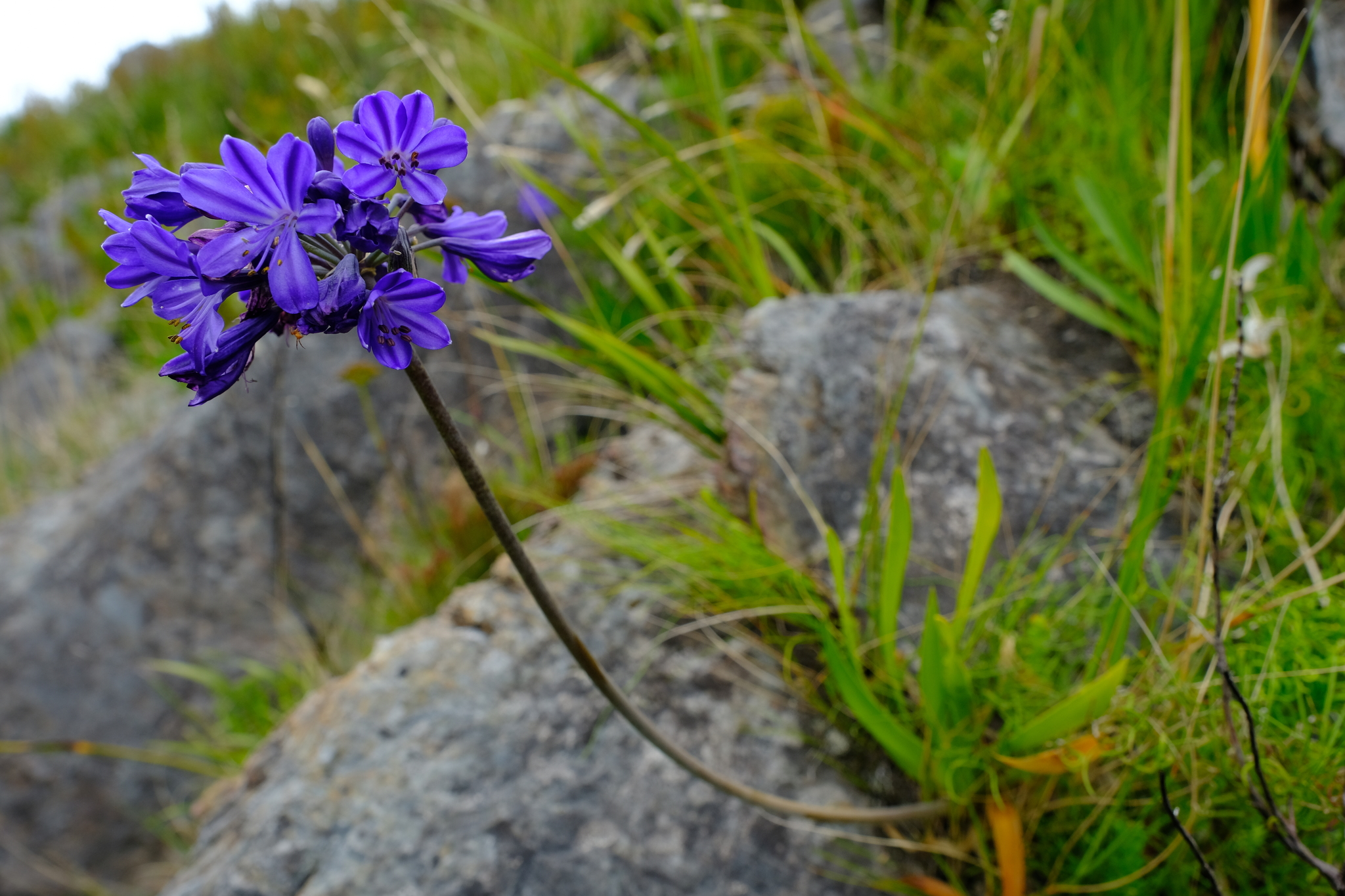
- In habitat

Scientific classification
- Kingdom: Plantae
- Clade: Embryophytes
- Clade: Tracheophytes
- Clade: Spermatophytes
- Clade: Angiosperms
- Clade: Monocots
- Order: Asparagales
- Family: Amaryllidaceae
- Subfamily: Agapanthoideae
- Genus: Agapanthus
- Species: A. africanus

Binomial name
- Agapanthus africanus (L.) Hoffmanns.

Synonyms
- Abumon africanum (L.) Britton; Agapanthus minor Lodd.; Agapanthus tuberosus L. ex DC. nom. inval.; Agapanthus umbellatus L'Hér.; Crinum africanum L.; Crinum floridum Salisb. nom. illeg.; Mauhlia africana (L.) Dahl; Mauhlia linearis Thunb.; Mauhlia umbellata (L'Hér.) Thunb. ex Schult. & Schult.f.; Tulbaghia africana (L.) Kuntze; Tulbaghia heisteri Fabr.; Tulbaghia minor (Lodd.) Kuntze

= Agapanthus africanus =

Species of flowering plant native to South Africa

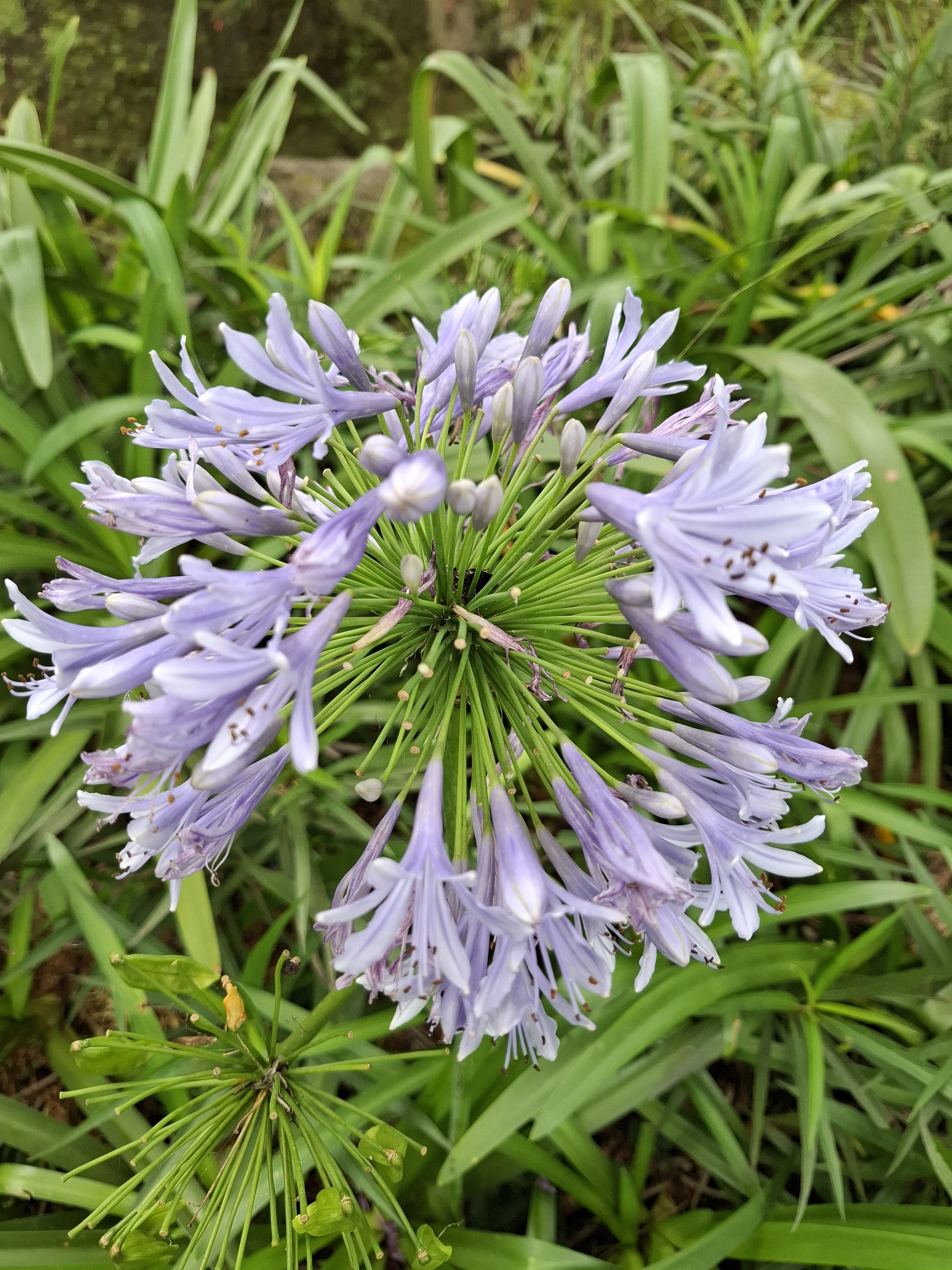
Flower of Agapanthus africanus

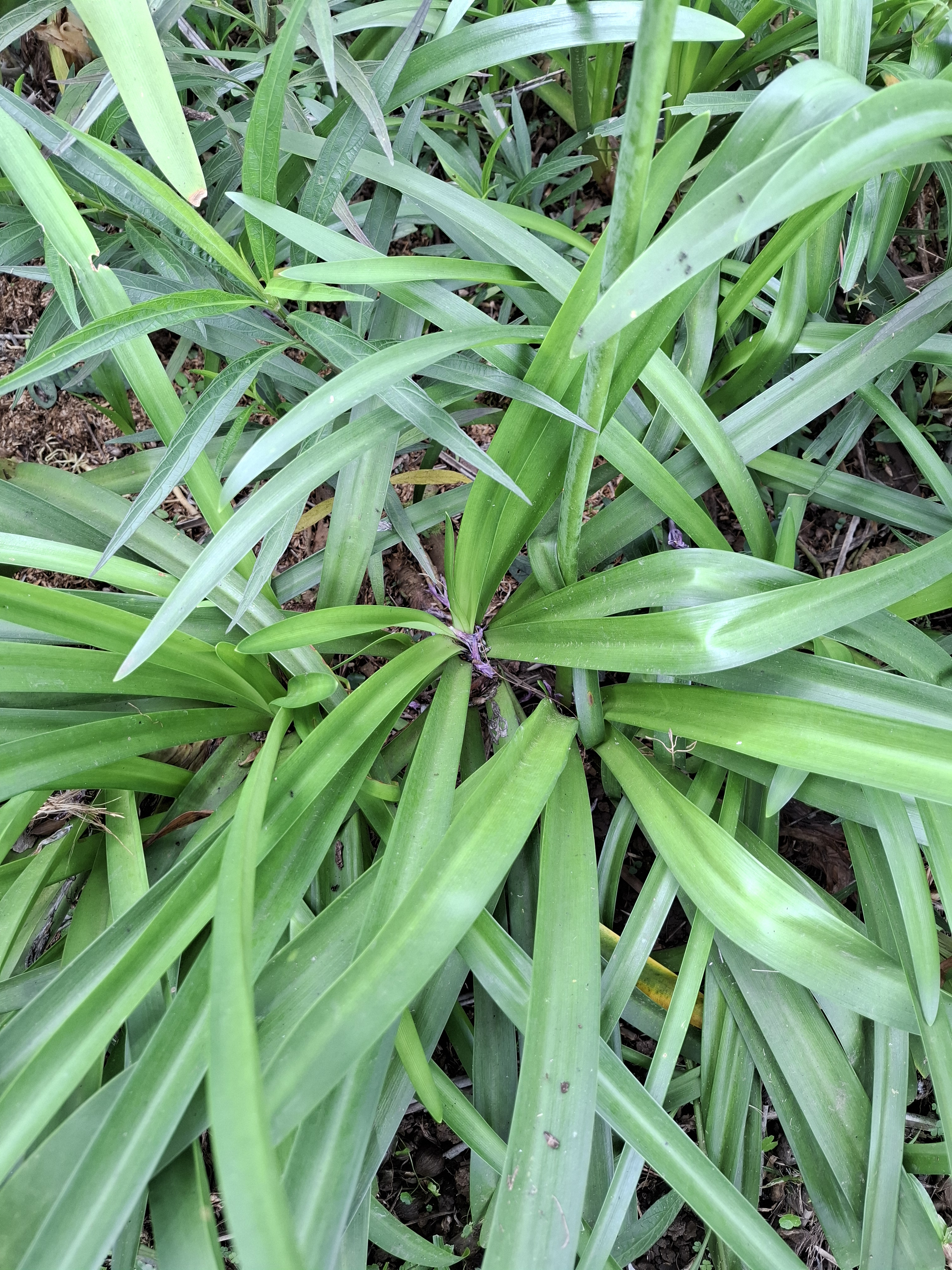
Leaf of Agapanthus africanus

Agapanthus africanus, commonly named the African lily, is a flowering plant from the genus Agapanthus found only on rocky sandstone slopes of the winter rainfall fynbos from the Cape Peninsula to Swellendam. It is also called the lily of the Nile in spite of only growing in South Africa.

== Description ==
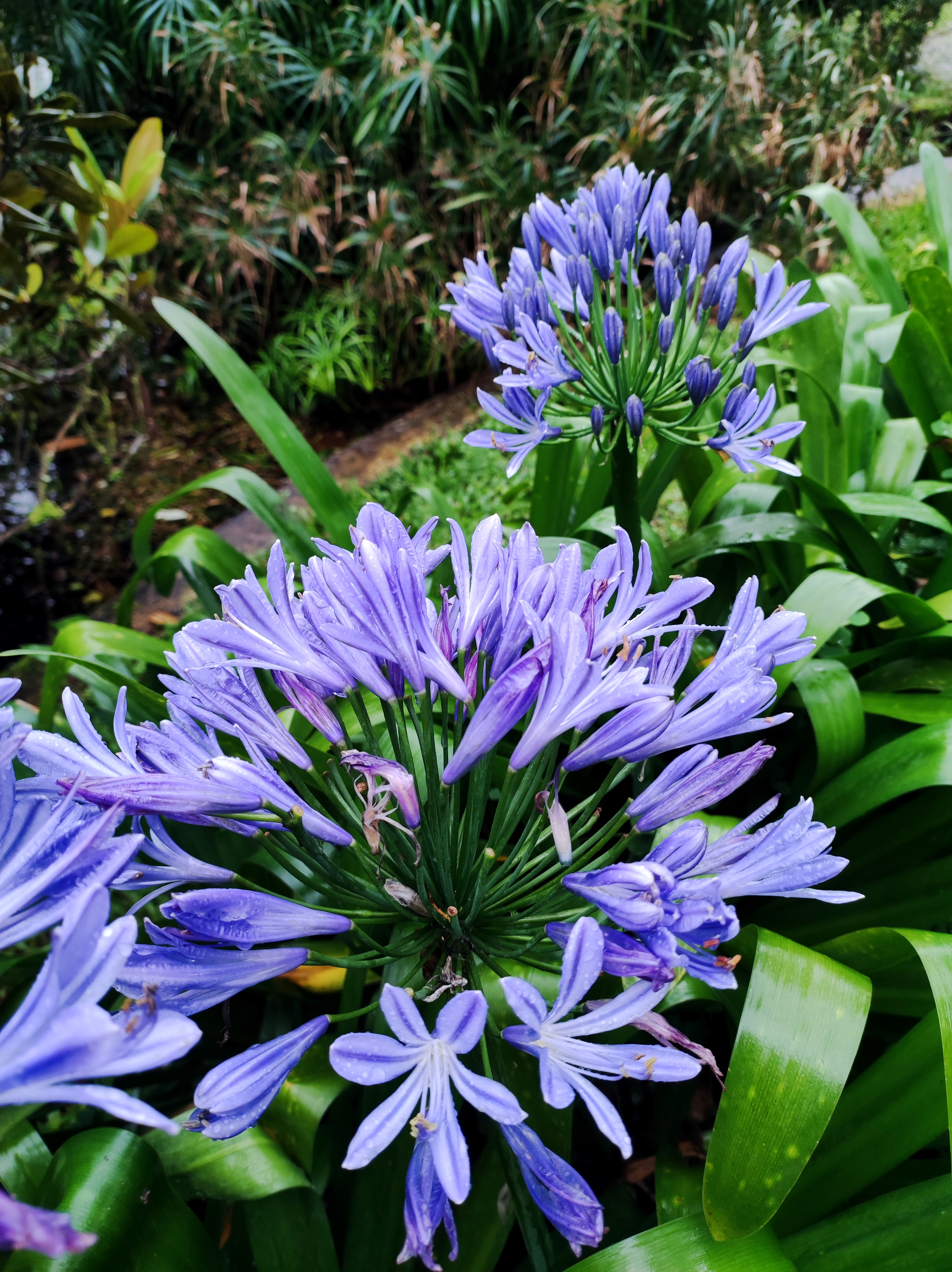
Agapanthus africanus in Nusantara Flower Garden, Indonesia

The plant is a rhizomatous evergreen geophyte from 25 to 70 cm (10 in to 2 ft 4 in) in height. The leathery leaves are suberect and long and strap shaped. Flowers are broadly funnel-shaped, pale to deep blue, and thick-textured with a dark blue stripe running down the center of each petal. Paler flowers are more common in Agapanthus africanus walshii while Agapanthus africanus africanus flowers tend to be darker. The flowers grow in large clusters, with each flower being 25–40 mm (31/32–1 9/16 in) long. This species flowers from November to April, particularly after fire. Peak flowering occurs from December to February.

== Ecology ==
Pollination is by wind, bees and sunbirds and seed dispersal by the wind. Chacma baboons and buck sometimes eat the flower heads just as the first flowers begin to open. These plants are adapted to survive fire in the fynbos and resprout from thick, fleshy roots after fire has passed through the area.

== Cultivation and use ==
Unlike the more common Agapanthus praecox, this species is less suitable as a garden plant as it is far more difficult to grow. A. africanus subsp. africanus may be grown in rockeries in a well drained, slightly acid sandy mix. They seem to be best when grown in shallow pots and will flower regularly if fed with a slow release fertiliser. A. africanus subsp. walshii is by far the most difficult Agapanthus to grow. It can only be grown as a container plant and will not survive if planted out. They require a very well-drained, sandy, acid mix with minimal watering in summer. Both subspecies require hot, dry summers, and winter rainfall climate. It will not tolerate extended freezing temperatures.

The name A. africanus has long been misapplied to A. praecox in horticultural use and publications across the world, and horticultural plants sold as A. africanus are actually hybrids or cultivars of A. praecox.

Extracts of A. africanus have been shown to have antifungal properties. Application of these extracts to the seeds of other plant species, including economically important species, has shown that it significantly reduces the severity of the impacts of certain pathogens. In the case of sorghum, this application was even found to perform better than Thiram, a commonly used fungicide when exposed to Sporisorium sorghi and S. cruentum. Similarly, it has found to induce resistance to rust leaf in wheat through increasing the activity of pathogenesis related proteins.

== Conservation ==
While the species as a whole has not yet been assessed, A. africanus subsp. walshii is considered to be endangered by the South African National Biodiversity Institute (SANBI). It is known only from a small area in the Elgin valley (less than five locations) and the population continues to decline. The largest subpopulation is threatened by unregulated informal settlement expansion. A proportion of the population is protected within the Kogelberg Biosphere Reserve and is not threatened.

== See also ==
- List of plants known as lily
