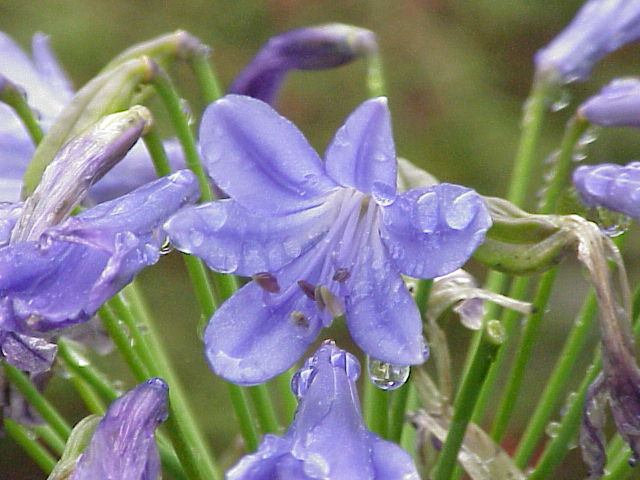
- Agapanthus praecox

Scientific classification
- Kingdom: Plantae
- Clade: Tracheophytes
- Clade: Angiosperms
- Clade: Monocots
- Order: Asparagales
- Family: Amaryllidaceae
- Subfamily: Agapanthoideae
- Genus: Agapanthus; L'Hér.

Type species
- Agapanthus africanus T.Durand and Schinz

Synonyms
- Abumon Adans.; Mauhlia Dahl; Tulbaghia Heist. 1755, rejected name, not L. 1771

= Agapanthus =

Genus of monocot flowering plants in the family Amaryllidaceae, order Asparagales

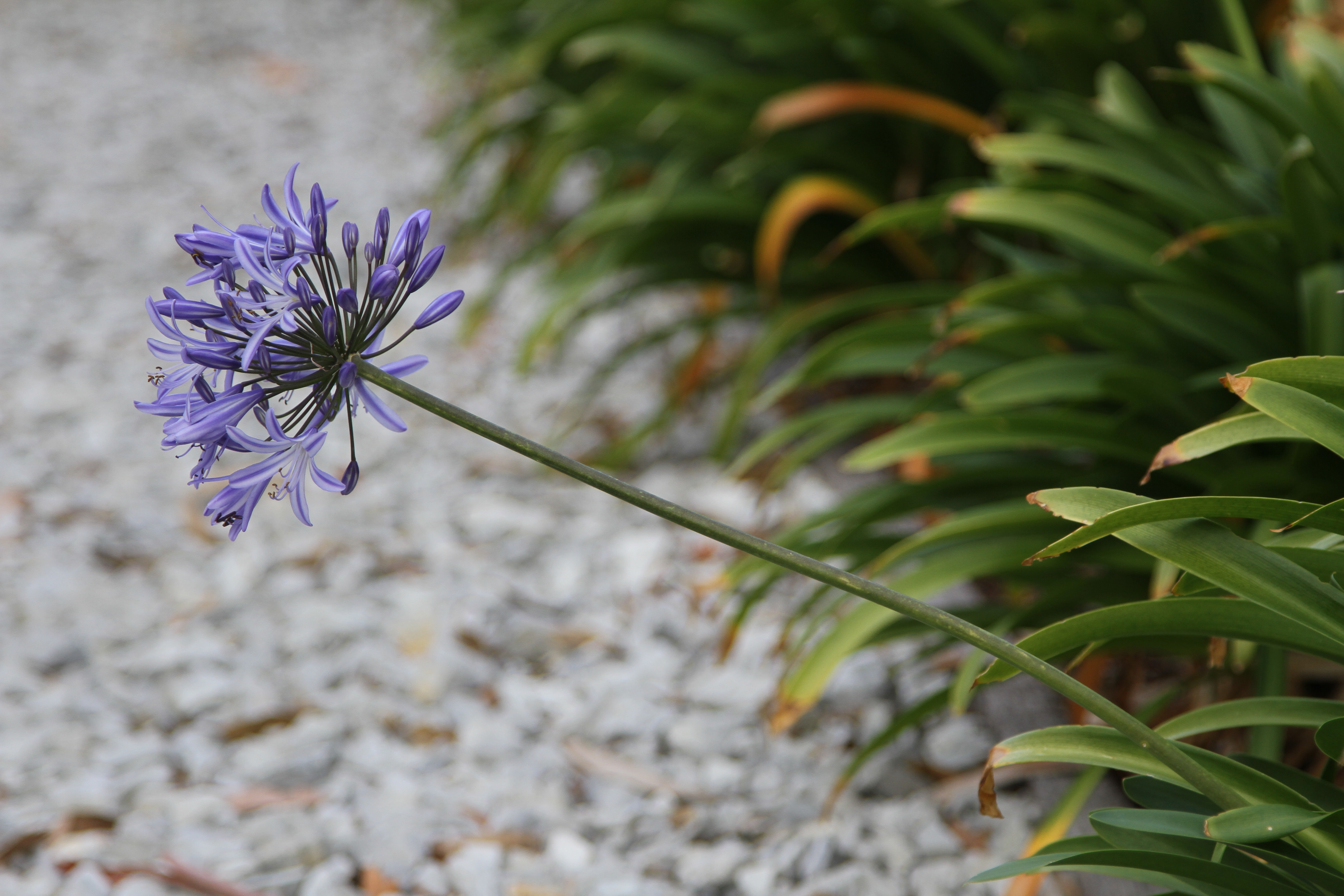
Agapanthus flower and leaves

Agapanthus (/ˌæɡəˈpænθəs/) is a genus of plants, the only one in the subfamily Agapanthoideae of the family Amaryllidaceae. The subfamily was formerly treated as a separate family, Agapanthaceae. The family is in the monocot order Asparagales. The name is derived from Ancient Greek ἀγάπη (agápē), meaning "love", and ἄνθος (ánthos), meaning "flower".

Some species of Agapanthus are commonly known as lily of the Nile, or African lily in the UK. However, they are not lilies, and all of the species are native to Southern Africa (South Africa, Lesotho, Eswatini, Mozambique), though some have become naturalized in scattered places around the world (Australia, Great Britain, Mexico, Ethiopia, Jamaica, etc.).

Species boundaries are not clear in the genus, and in spite of having been intensively studied, the number of species recognized by different authorities varies from 6 to 10. The type species for the genus is Agapanthus africanus. Many hybrids and cultivars have been produced. They are cultivated throughout warm areas of the world. They can especially be spotted throughout Northern California. Most of these were described in a book published in 2004.

== Description ==
Agapanthus is a genus of herbaceous perennials that mostly bloom in summer. This leads to the Australian common name, Star of Bethlehem, as it blooms just before Christmas. The leaves are basal, curved, and linear, growing up to 60 cm (24 in) long. They are rather leathery and arranged in two opposite rows. The plant has a mostly underground stem called a rhizome (like a ginger 'root') that is used as a storage organ. The roots, which grow out of the rhizome, are white, thick and fleshy.

The inflorescence is a pseudo-umbel subtended by two large deciduous bracts at the apex of a long, erect scape, up to 2 m (6.6 ft) tall. They have funnel-shaped or tubular flowers, in hues of blue to purple, shading to white. Some hybrids and cultivars have colors not found in wild plants which includes bi-colored blue/lavender and white flowers flushed with pink as the blooms mature. The ovary is superior. The style is hollow. Agapanthus does not have the distinctive chemistry of Allioideae.

== Taxonomy ==
The genus Agapanthus was established by Charles Louis L'Héritier de Brutelle in 1788.

=== Family placement ===
Which family the genus belongs to has been a matter of debate since its creation. In the Cronquist system, the genus was placed in a very broadly defined family Liliaceae, along with other lilioid monocots. In 1985, Dahlgren, Clifford, and Yeo placed Agapanthus in Alliaceae, close to Tulbaghia. Their version of Alliaceae also included several genera that would later be transferred to Themidaceae.

In 1996, following a phylogenetic analysis of DNA sequences of the gene rbcL, Themidaceae was resurrected and Agapanthus was removed from Alliaceae. The authors found Agapanthus to be sister to Amaryllidaceae and transferred it to that family. This was not accepted by the Angiosperm Phylogeny Group when they published the original APG system in 1998, because the clade consisting of Agapanthus and Amaryllidaceae had only 63% bootstrap support. The APG system recognized three separate families, Agapanthaceae, Alliaceae sensu stricto, and Amaryllidaceae sensu stricto. Agapanthaceae consisted of Agapanthus only, and Dahlgren's idea that it is close to Tulbaghia was rejected.

When the APG II system was published in 2003, it offered the option of combining Agapanthaceae, Alliaceae sensu stricto, and Amaryllidaceae sensu stricto to form a larger family, Alliaceae sensu lato. When the name Amaryllidaceae was conserved by the ICBN for this larger family, its name was changed from Alliaceae to Amaryllidaceae, but its circumscription remained the same. When APG II was replaced by APG III in 2009, Agapanthaceae was no longer accepted, but was treated as subfamily Agapanthoideae of the larger version of Amaryllidaceae. Also in 2009, Armen Takhtajan recognized the three smaller families allowed by APG II, instead of combining them as in APG III.

The table below summarizes the alternative family divisions:

Alternative treatments of Amaryllidaceae s.l.
Separate families	Single family	Subfamilies
Agapanthaceae	Amaryllidaceae s.l. (formerly Alliaceae s.l.)	Agapanthoideae
Alliaceae s.s.	Amaryllidaceae s.l. (formerly Alliaceae s.l.)	Allioideae
Amaryllidaceae s.s.	Amaryllidaceae s.l. (formerly Alliaceae s.l.)	Amaryllidoideae

Further molecular phylogenetic analyses of DNA sequences have confirmed that Agapanthus is sister to a clade consisting of subfamilies Allioideae and Amaryllidoideae of the family Amaryllidaceae (sensu APG III).

- Amaryllidaceae s.l.
  - Agapanthus (Agapanthoideae)
  - - Allioideae
    - Amarylloideae

=== Species ===
Zonneveld and Duncan (2003) divided Agapanthus into six species (A. africanus, A. campanulatus, A. caulescens, A. coddii, A. inapertus, A. praecox). Four additional species had earlier been recognised by Leighton (1965) (A. comptonii, A. dyeri, A. nutans and A. walshii), but were given subspecific rank by Zonneveld and Duncan. As of December 2013, the World Checklist of Selected Plant Families recognises seven species:

Image	Scientific name	Synonyms and common name	Distribution
	Agapanthus africanus (L.) Hoffmanns	syn. A. umbellatus; African Lily or African Tulip	South Africa (Cape Peninsula to Swellendam)
	Agapanthus campanulatus F.M.Leight.	African bluebell, African Blue lily or Bell Agapanthus	South Africa (Drakensberg)
	Agapanthus caulescens Spreng.		South Africa (Swaziland and Kwazulu-Natal and Mpumalanga.)
	Agapanthus coddii F.M.Leight.	Codd's Agapanthus or Blue Lily	South Africa ( western Waterberg around the Marakele National Park )
	Agapanthus inapertus Beauverd	including A. dyeri; Drakensberg Agapanthus or Drooping Agapanthus	Mozambique, Eswatini (Swaziland), and South Africa (Transvaal and Natal)
	Agapanthus praecox Willd.	including A. comptonii, A. orientalis; Common Agapanthus, Blue Lily, African Lily, or Lily of the Nile	South Africa (Kwa-Zulu Natal and Western Cape)
	Agapanthus walshii L.Bolus		South Africa (Western Cape)

Formerly Included

The name Agapanthus ensifolius was coined in 1799, referring to a species now called Lachenalia ensifolia. (see Lachenalia).

== Cultivation ==
Agapanthus praecox can be grown within USDA plant hardiness zones 9 to 11. In lower-numbered zones, the rhizomes should be placed deeper in the soil and mulched well in the fall. Summer water should be provided. Agapanthus can be propagated by dividing clumps or by seeds. The seeds of most varieties are fertile.

Several hundred cultivars and hybrids are cultivated as garden and landscape plants. Several are winter-hardy to USDA Zone 7.

In the UK the following cultivars have received the Royal Horticultural Society's Award of Garden Merit:

- 'Blue Ice' - pale blue
- 'Blue Magic' - dark blue
- Double Diamond ('Rfdd') - white
- Fireworks ('Mdb001') - white/purple
- 'Happy Blue' - light blue
- 'Hoyland Blue' - white/pale blue
- 'Ice Blue Star' - pale blue-violet
- 'Jacaranda' - blue/dark stripe
- 'Jonny's White' - white
- 'Leicester' - white
- 'Loch Hope' - deep blue
- 'Luly' - pale blue/violet
- 'Marjorie' - pale violet-blue
- 'Megan's Mauve' - lavender-blue
- 'Midnight Star' - deep blue
- 'Monique' - deep blue
- 'Northern Star' - violet/deep blue
- 'Purple Delight' - purple
- 'Royal Blue' - bright blue
- 'Sandringham' - bright blue
- 'Sandy' - pale violet-blue
- Silver Moon ('Notfred') - blue
- 'Sky' - sky blue
- 'Summer Days' pale/dark blue

There are seven UK National Collection of Agapanthus, held by:

- Ian Scroggy at Bali-Hai Nursery in Carnlough, County Antrim.
- Mike Grimshaw in Cam, Gloucestershire (cultivars bred and raised by Dick Fulcher).
- Mike Grimshaw in Cam, Gloucestershire (pre-2005 cultivars).
- Patrick Fairweather at Fairweather's Garden Centre in Beaulieu, Hampshire (cultivars from the Fairweather Nursery trials).
- Hoyland Plant Centre in Barnsley, Yorkshire (Hoyland hybrids, variegated, and special interest).
- Mrs Ruth Penrose at Bowdens Nursery in Sticklepath, Devon (Pine Cottage cultivars).
- Mr & Mrs R J & C L Fulcher in Eggesford, Devon (Pine Cottage cultivars).

=== Invasive species ===
In some regions, some agapanthus are listed as invasive species of plants. In New Zealand, Agapanthus praecox is classed as an "environmental weed" and calls to have it added to the National Pest Plant Accord have encountered opposition from gardeners.

=== Pests ===
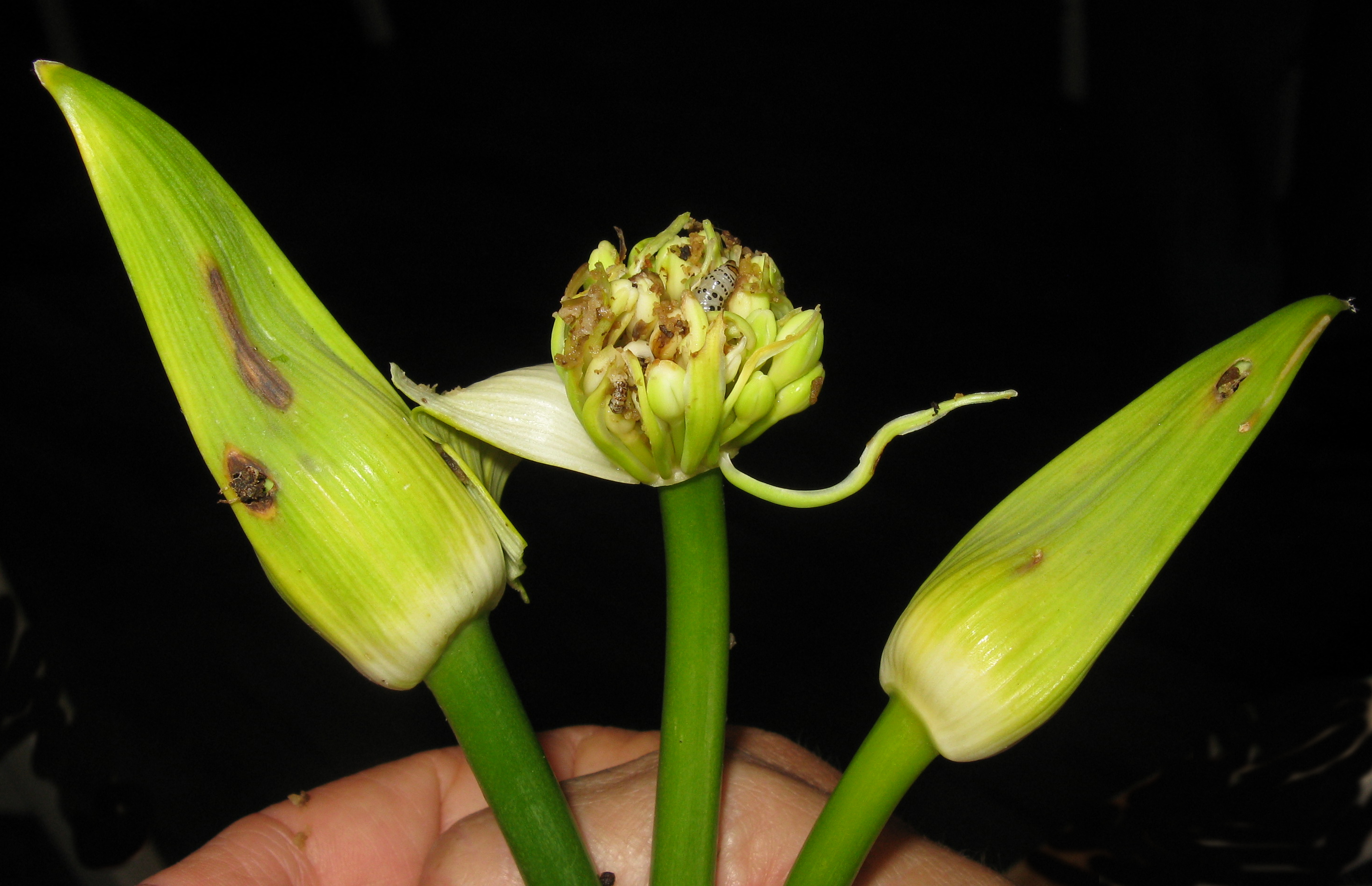
Neuranethes spodopterodes in affected inflorescence buds, the central specimen opened to reveal larvae

As a rule, Agapanthus species are pest-hardy, neither being much attacked nor drastically affected by common garden pests. However, since the early 21st century Agapanthus in the far south of South Africa have fallen victim to a species of noctuid moth, the Agapanthus borer, Neuranethes spodopterodes. The larvae of the moth bore into the budding inflorescence and as they mature they tunnel down towards the roots, or emerge from the stem and drop down to feed on the leaves or rhizomes. A severe attack promotes rot and may stunt or even kill the plant; even plants that survive commonly lose most of their inflorescences and fail to produce the desired show of flowers.

Though Neuranethes spodopterodes is invasive in the regions where it has emerged as a pest, it is not an exotic invader, but a translocated species, having been imported inadvertently from its natural range in more northerly regions of the country. In its original range, the moth is not of horticultural importance, being controlled by natural enemies that as yet have neither been identified nor imported along with the host plants. In contrast, the Agapanthus borer is of considerable concern in the South West, and its voracity is so impressive that the species shows promise as a possible control for invasive Agapanthus praecox in countries like New Zealand.

In 2016, a new species of gall midge, Enigmadiplosis agapanthi, was described damaging Agapanthus in the United Kingdom.

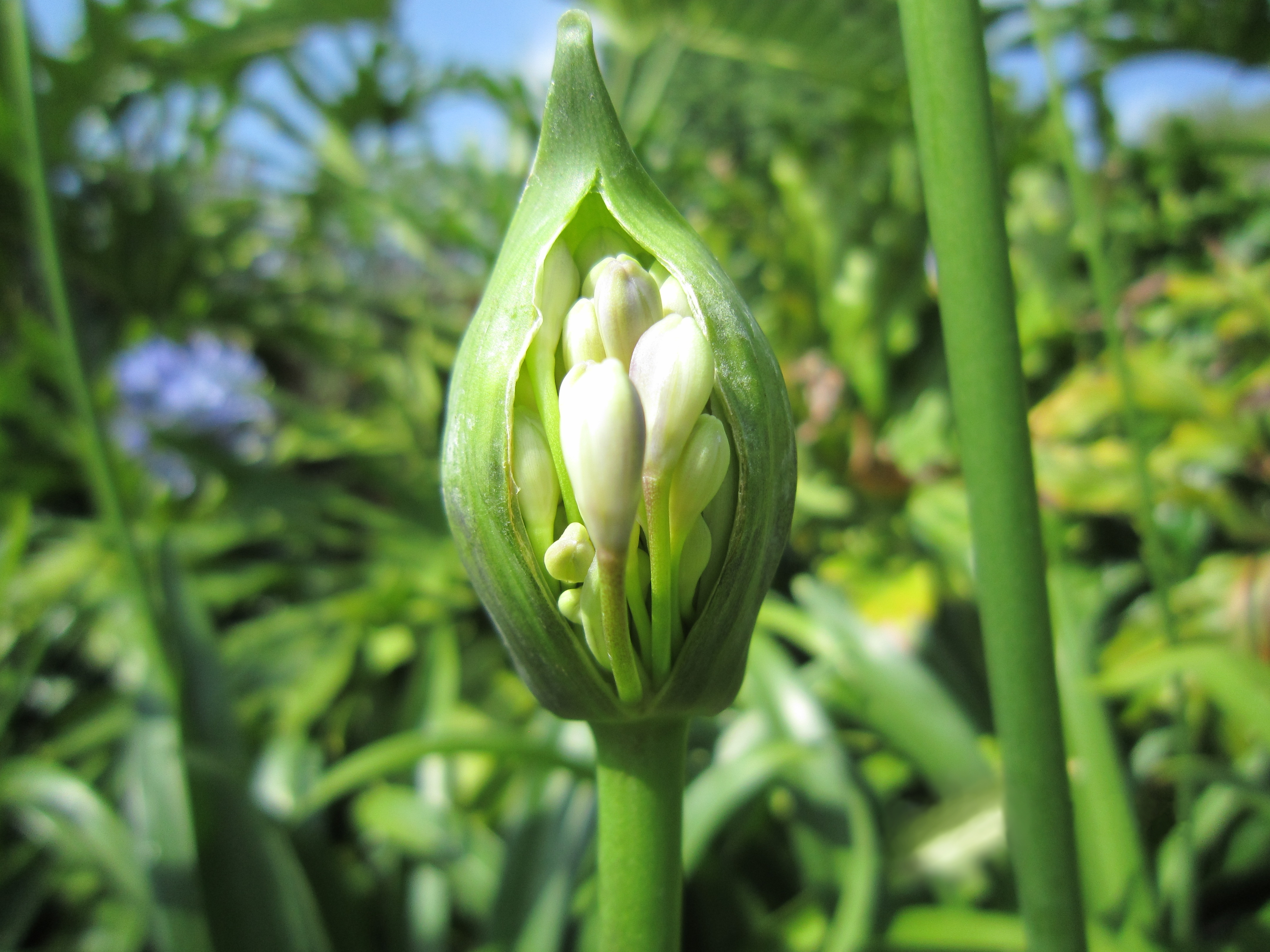
Beginning to bloom

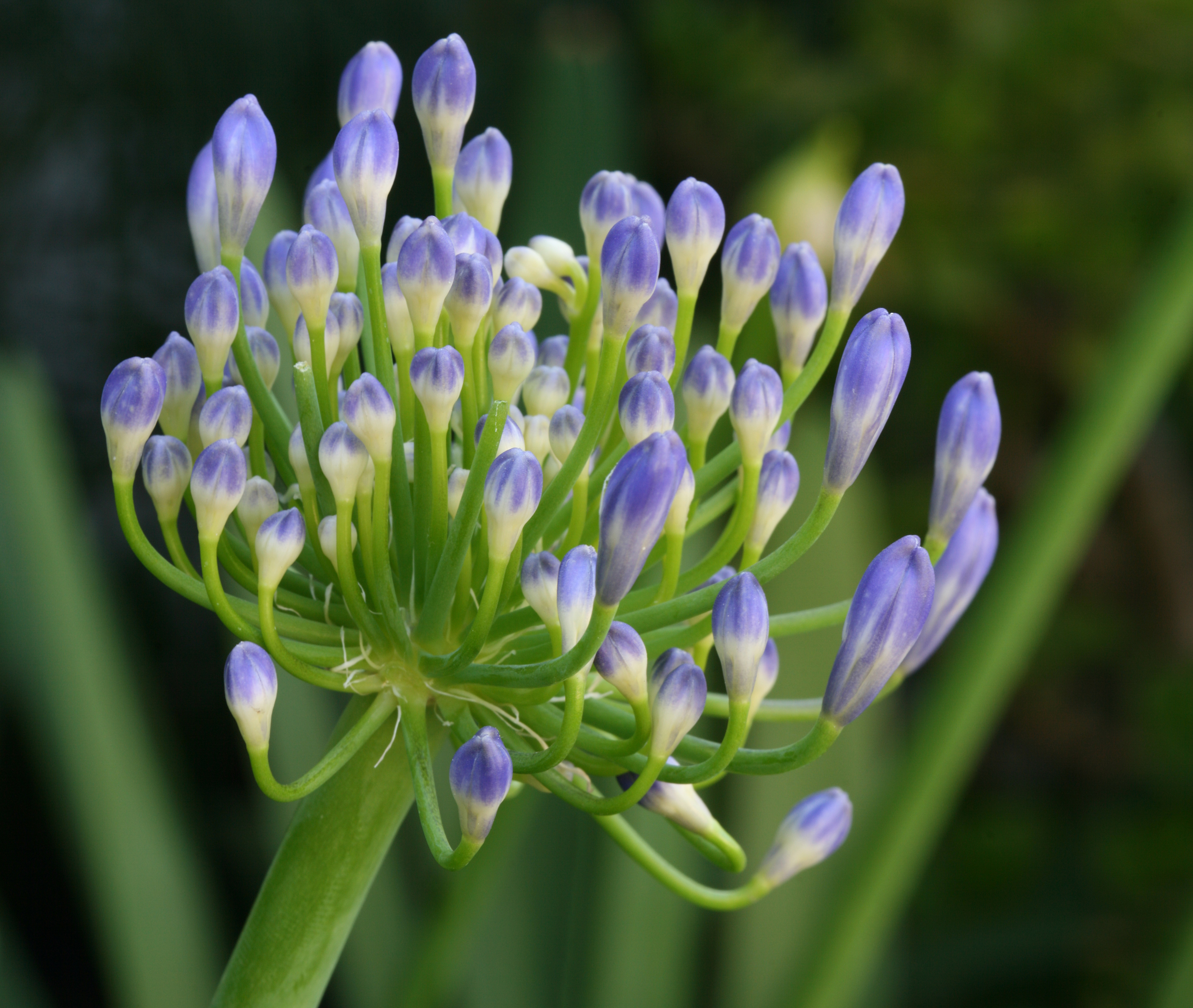
Pre-bloom stage

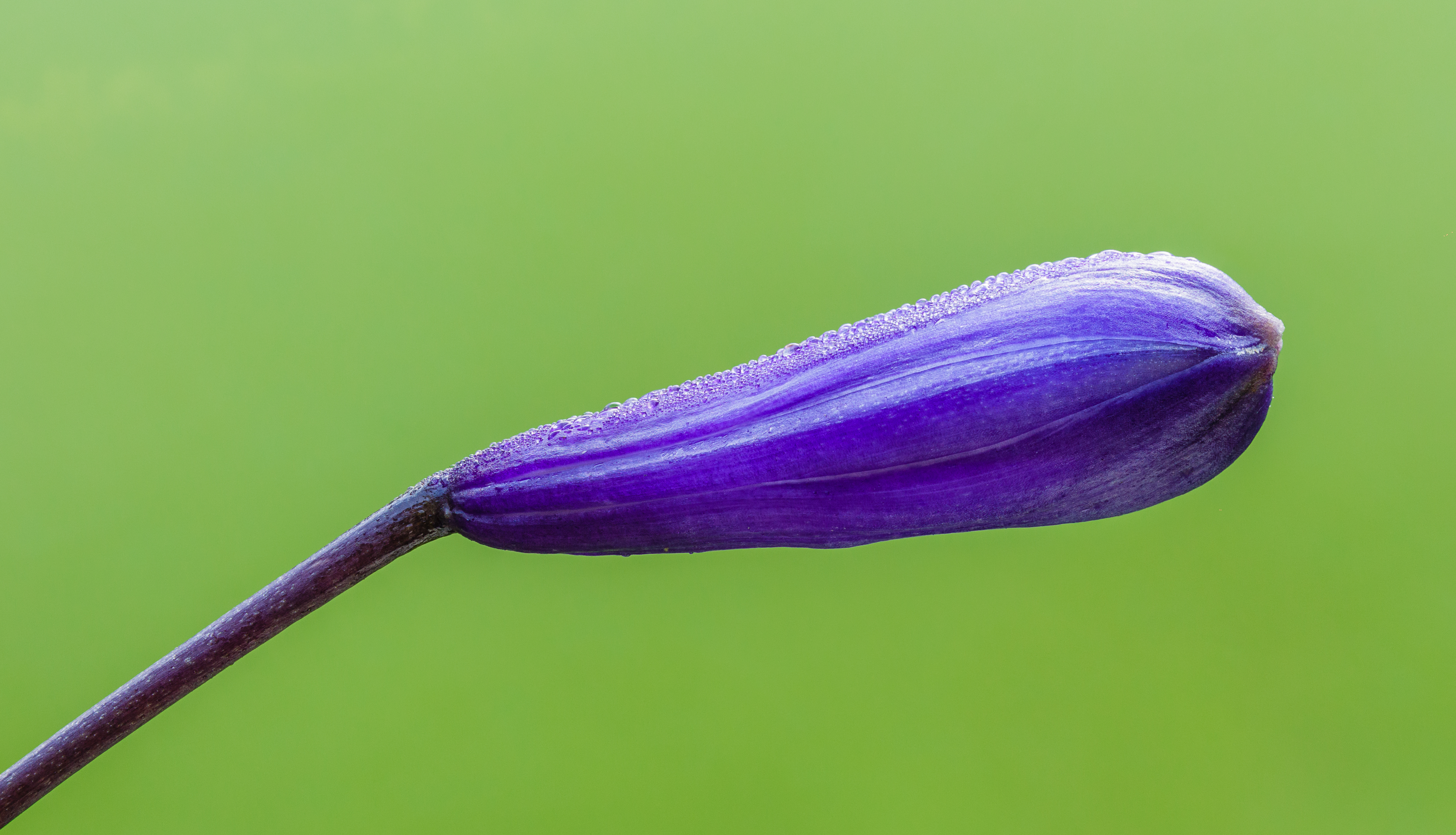
Single pre-bloom bud

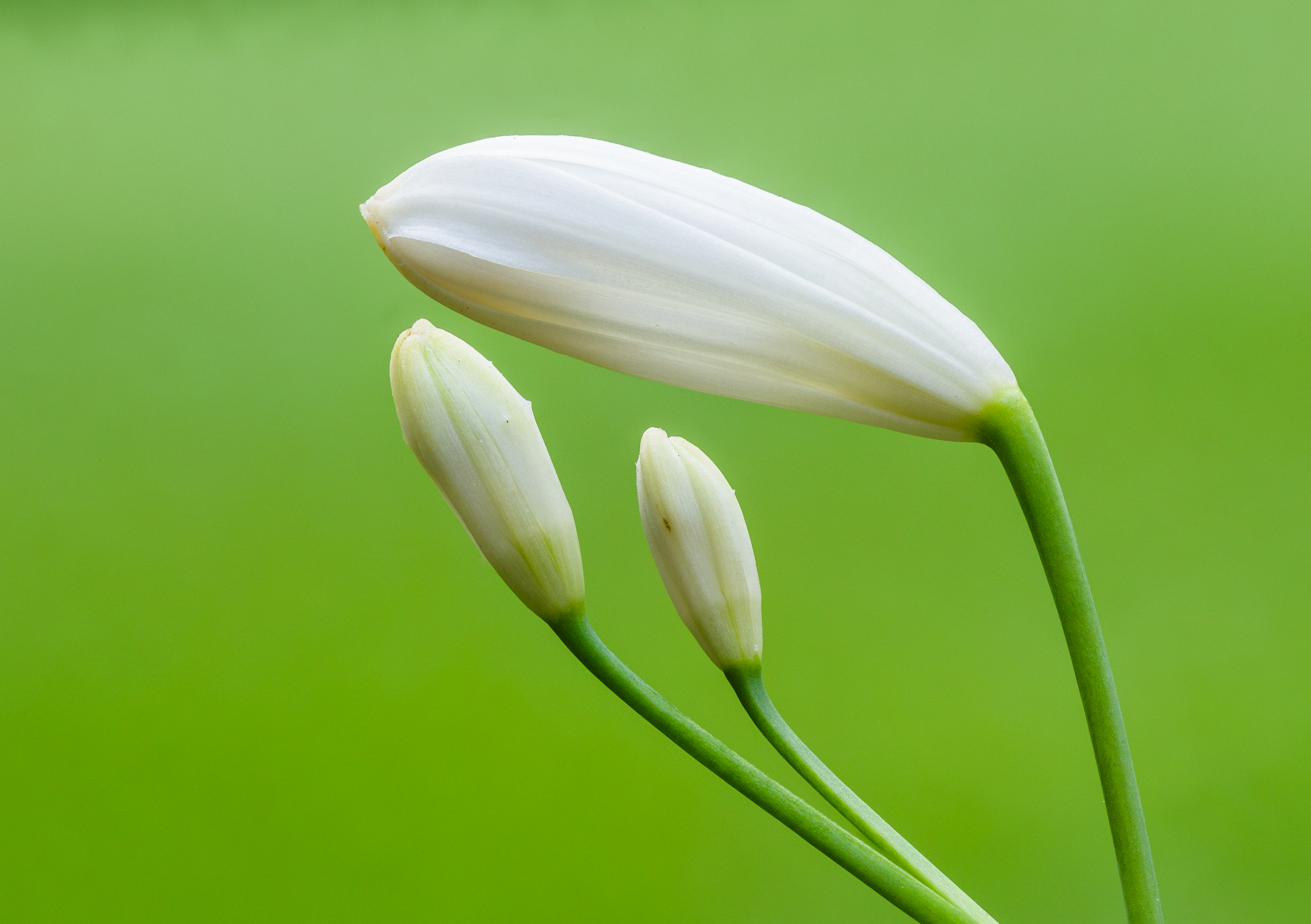
Flower buds of a Agapanthus praecox Snow White. A pure white dwarf, 45 cm.

== Allergenic potential ==
Agapanthus has low potential for causing allergies; its OPALS allergy scale rating is 2 out of 10.

It can cause itchy skin, burning sensation, as well as irritation if the sap from the leaves come in contact with skin. If ingested medical advice should be sought immediately.
