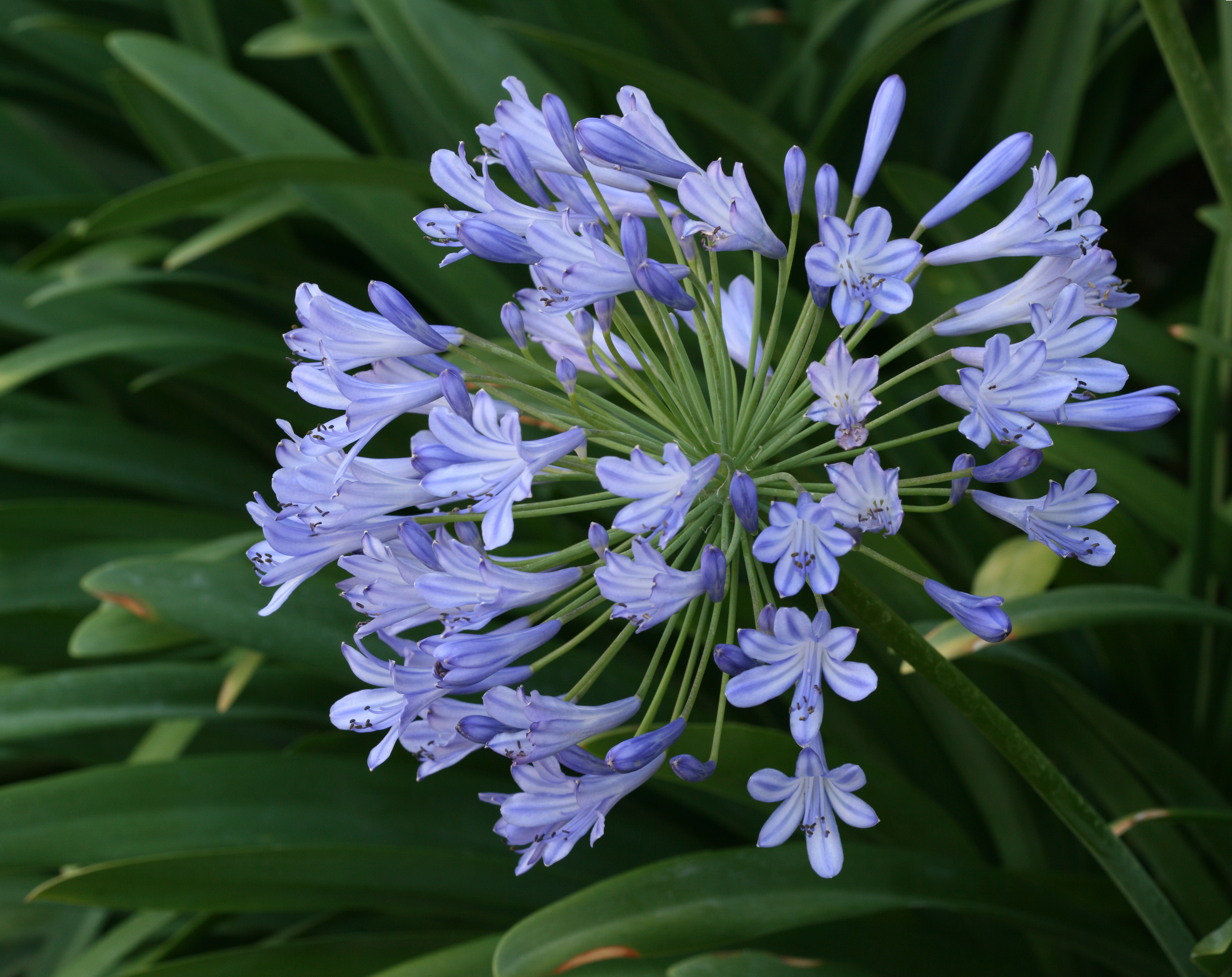

Scientific classification
- Kingdom: Plantae
- Clade: Tracheophytes
- Clade: Angiosperms
- Clade: Monocots
- Order: Asparagales
- Family: Amaryllidaceae
- Subfamily: Agapanthoideae
- Genus: Agapanthus
- Species: A. praecox

Binomial name
- Agapanthus praecox Willd.

= Agapanthus praecox =

Species of flowering plant

Agapanthus praecox (common agapanthus, blue lily, African lily, or lily of the Nile) is a popular garden plant around the world, especially in Mediterranean climates. It is native to the Kwa-Zulu Natal and Eastern Cape provinces of South Africa. Local names include agapant, bloulelie, isicakathi and ubani. Most of the cultivated plants of the genus Agapanthus are hybrids or cultivars of this species. It is divided into three subspecies: subsp.praecox, subsp. orientalis and subsp. minimus.

== Description ==
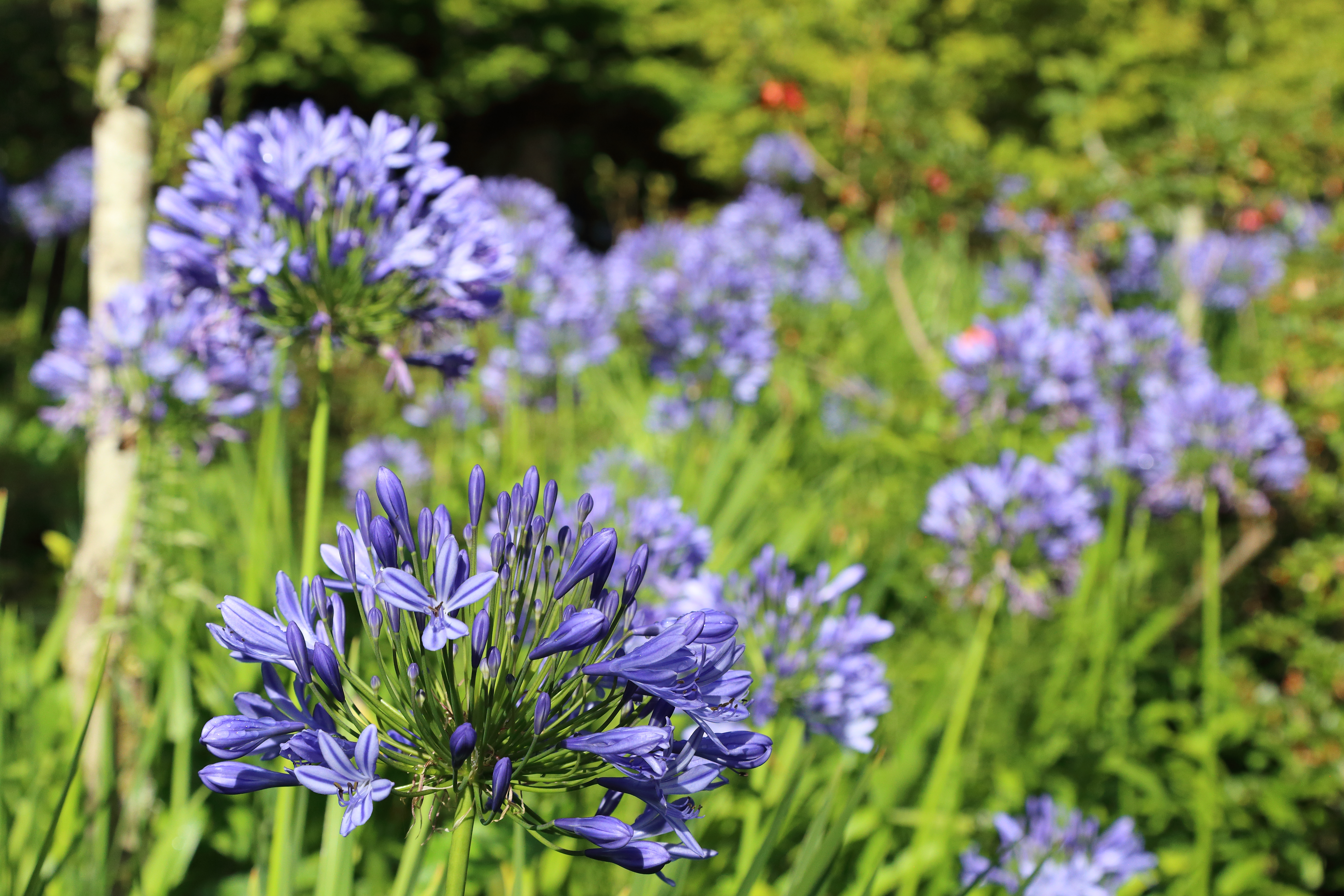
Flowering clumps

Agapanthus praecox is a variable species with open-faced flowers. It is a perennial plant that can live for up to 75 years. Its evergreen leaves are 2 cm wide and 50 cm long. Its inflorescence is an umbel. The flowers are blue, purple or white and bloom from late spring to summer, followed by capsules filled with black seeds. Its flowering stem reaches one meter high. Its roots are very powerful and can break concrete.

=== Subspecies ===
Agapanthus praecox subsp. praecox

This subspecies occurs in the Eastern Cape province of South Africa. It usually grows to between 0.8 and 1 metre tall and has 10 to 11 leathery leaves. The blue flowers appear from December to February. These have perianth segments which are greater than 50 mm in length.

Agapanthus praecox subsp. orientalis

This subspecies occurs in the Eastern Cape and southern KwaZulu-Natal. Although it is about the same height as subsp. praecox, it has up to 20 poisonous, strap-like leaves per plant which are arching and are not leathery. These range in length from 20 to 70 cm and are 3 to 5 cm wide. Flower colour ranges from blue to white. Shiny black seeds are produced in three-sided capsules. These have perianth segments which are less than 50 mm in length.

Agapanthus praecox subsp. minimus

Occurring in the southeastern Western Cape and Eastern Cape, this subspecies is the smallest, ranging in height from 300 to 600 mm. It has a longer flowering season, from November to March. Flower colour includes white and various shades of blue.

== Cultivation ==
The plant prefers a well-drained soil, but supports a poor soil. Exposure to full sun is preferable, but it supports partial shade. It has low tolerance to being moved. It can be multiplied by sowing (flowering under 3 to 4 years) or division. It tolerates drought once well installed, but watering is preferable in case of long dry periods. It overwinters as a stump and therefore completely disappears during the cold months. Contrary to popular belief, this species can withstand wind, frost and cold up to −15 °C provided that the strains are protected for the first two years with mulching.

Young shoots need to be protected from slugs and snails. A contribution of 2 or 3 handfuls of wood ash around the stump in the spring may keep the gastropods away and make a good contribution of potash.

== Naturalisation ==
The species is naturalised in Australia, New Zealand and the Isles of Scilly. It is reportedly naturalised in Madeira, the Canary Islands, Eritrea, Ethiopia, St. Helena, Jersey, Norfolk Island, Mexico, Honduras, Costa Rica and Tristan da Cunha.

Agapanthus praecox subsp. orientalis is highly regarded for being tough in sun and heat, long-flowering, and is a favourite for many councils in Australia for the landscaping of roads and other public areas which do not get watered. The plant is still widely planted but in some areas it is considered a weed, and planting has been discontinued, although it is not generally regarded as highly invasive.

== Gallery ==
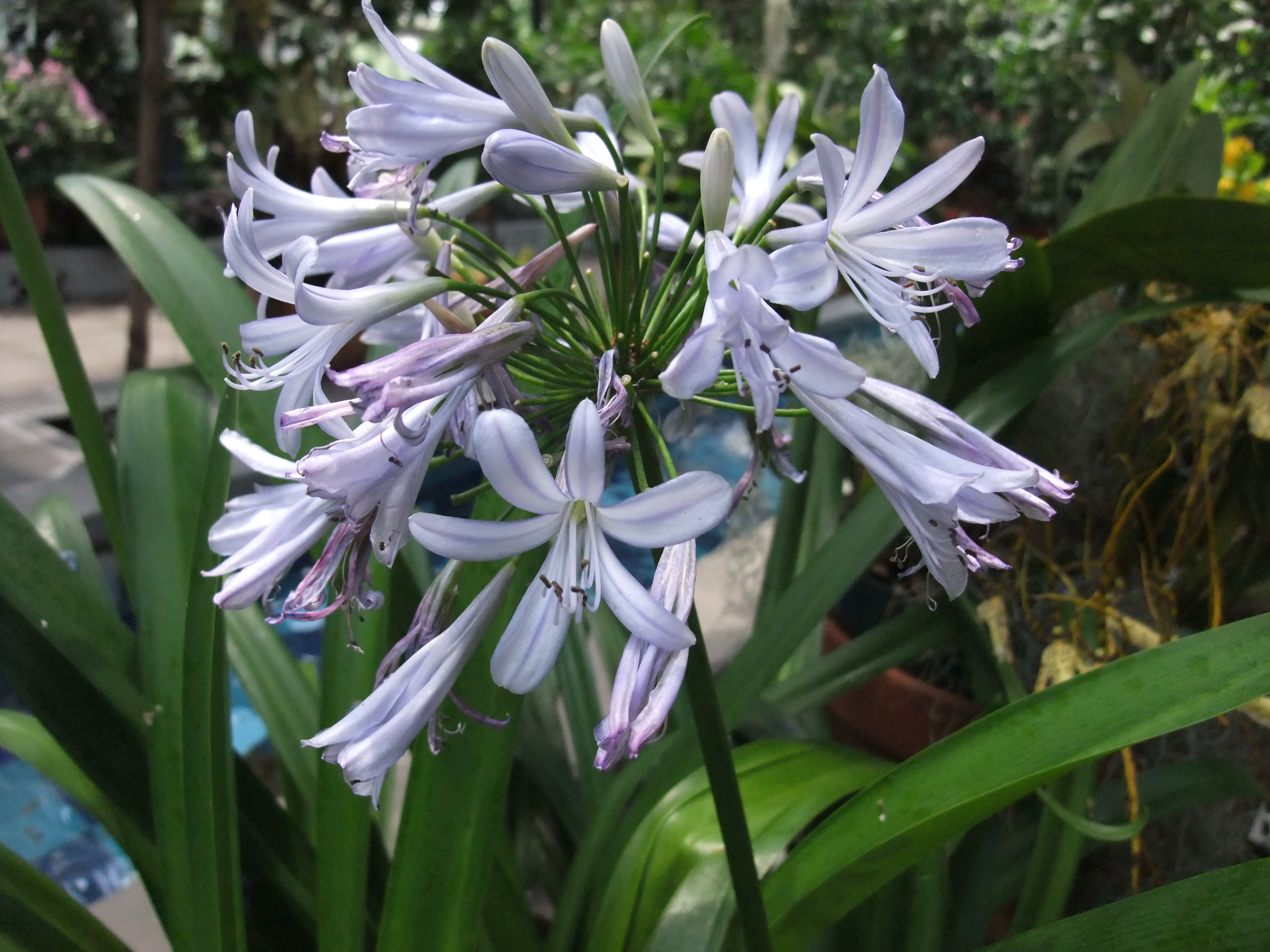
Closeup of the flowers from the subspecies Orientalis.

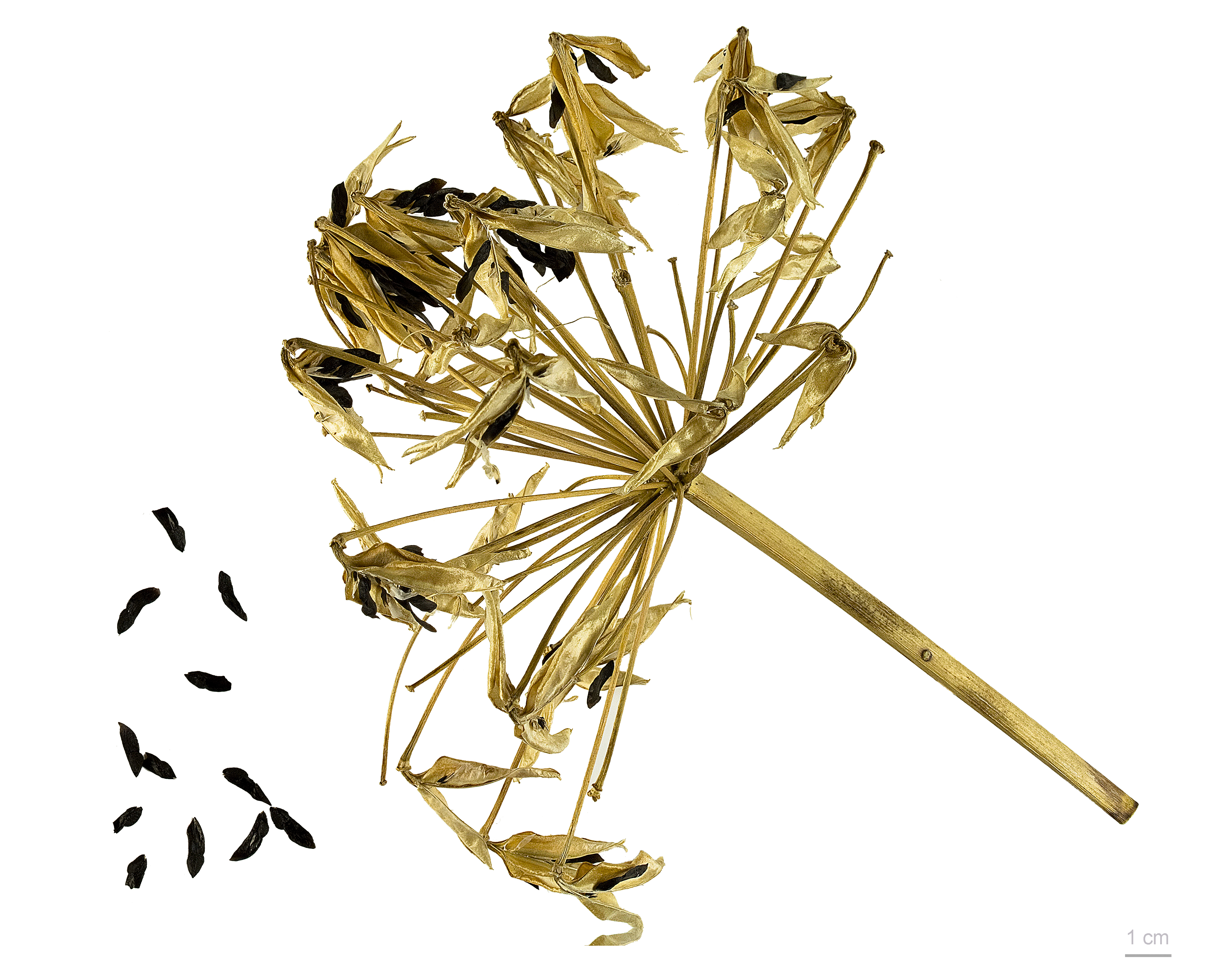
Agapanthus praecox – MHNT

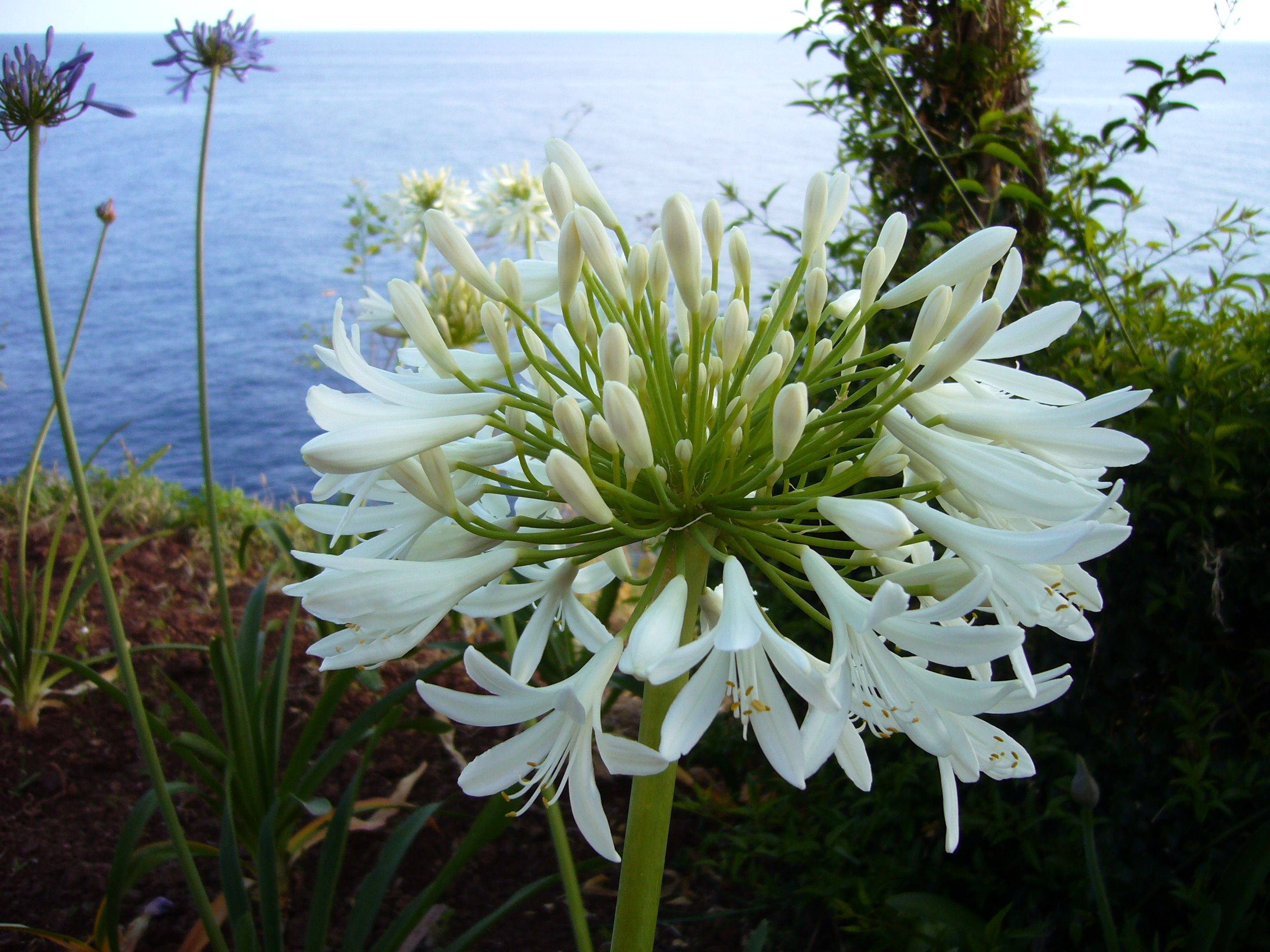
White flowers

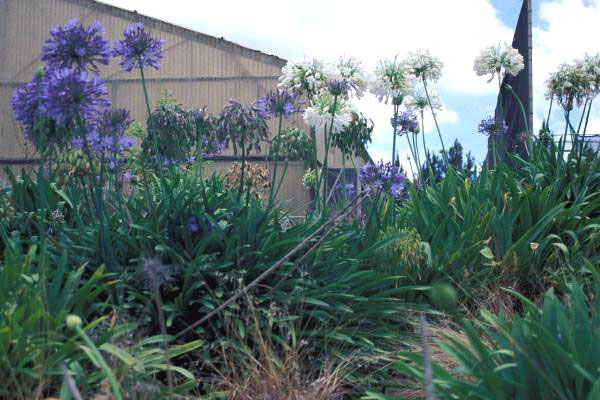
In a garden setting

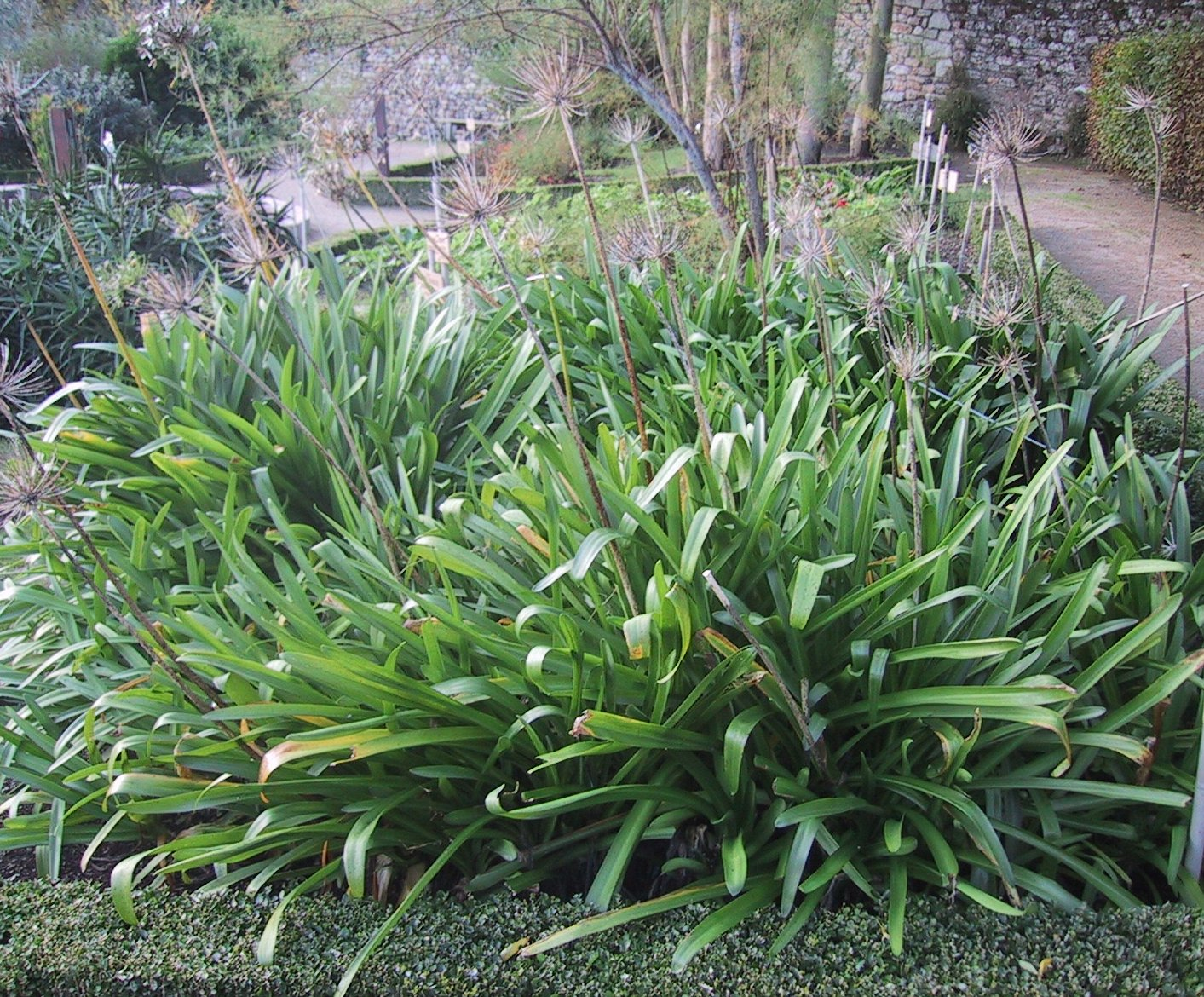
In autumn

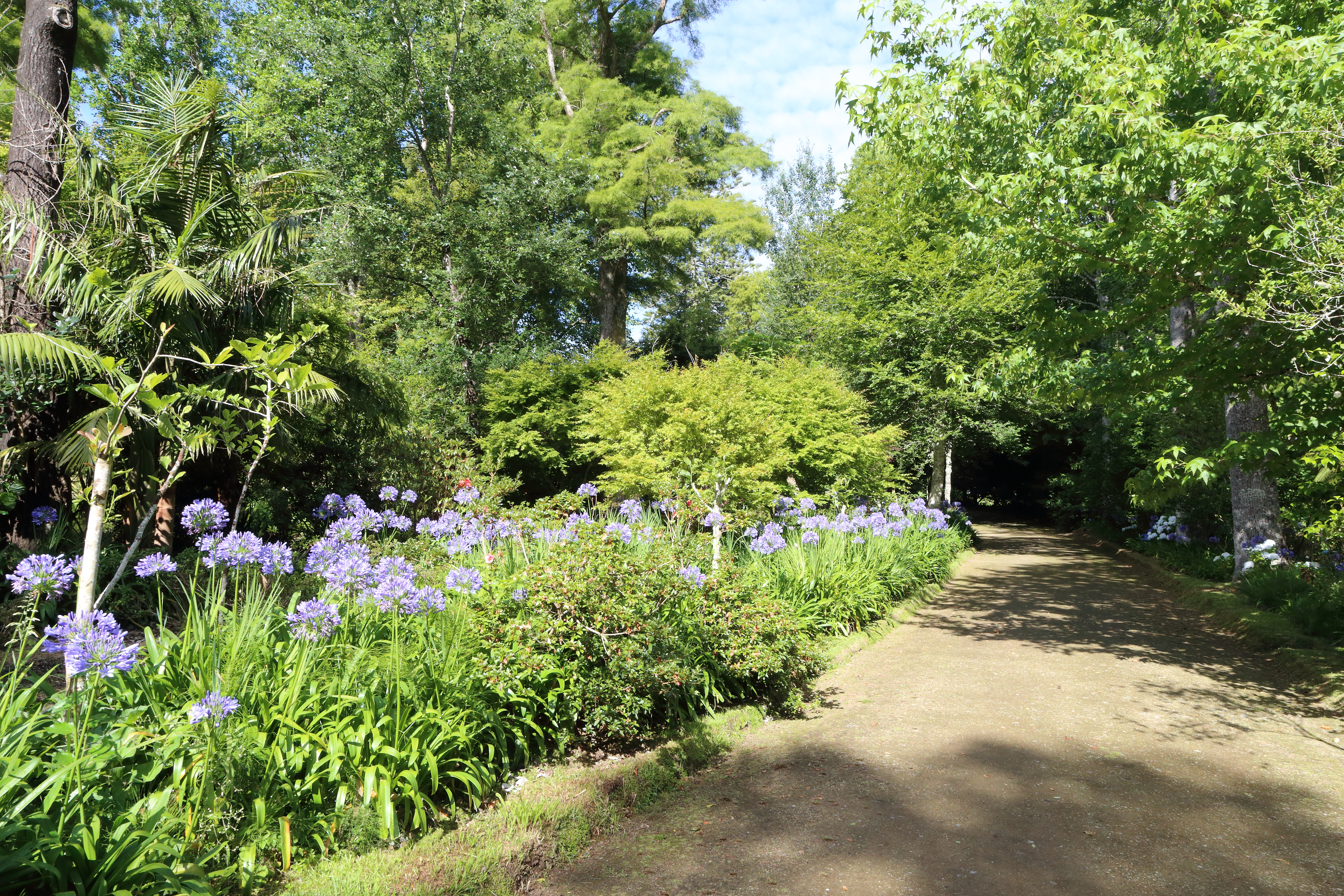
A row of the plants in Furnas, the Azores

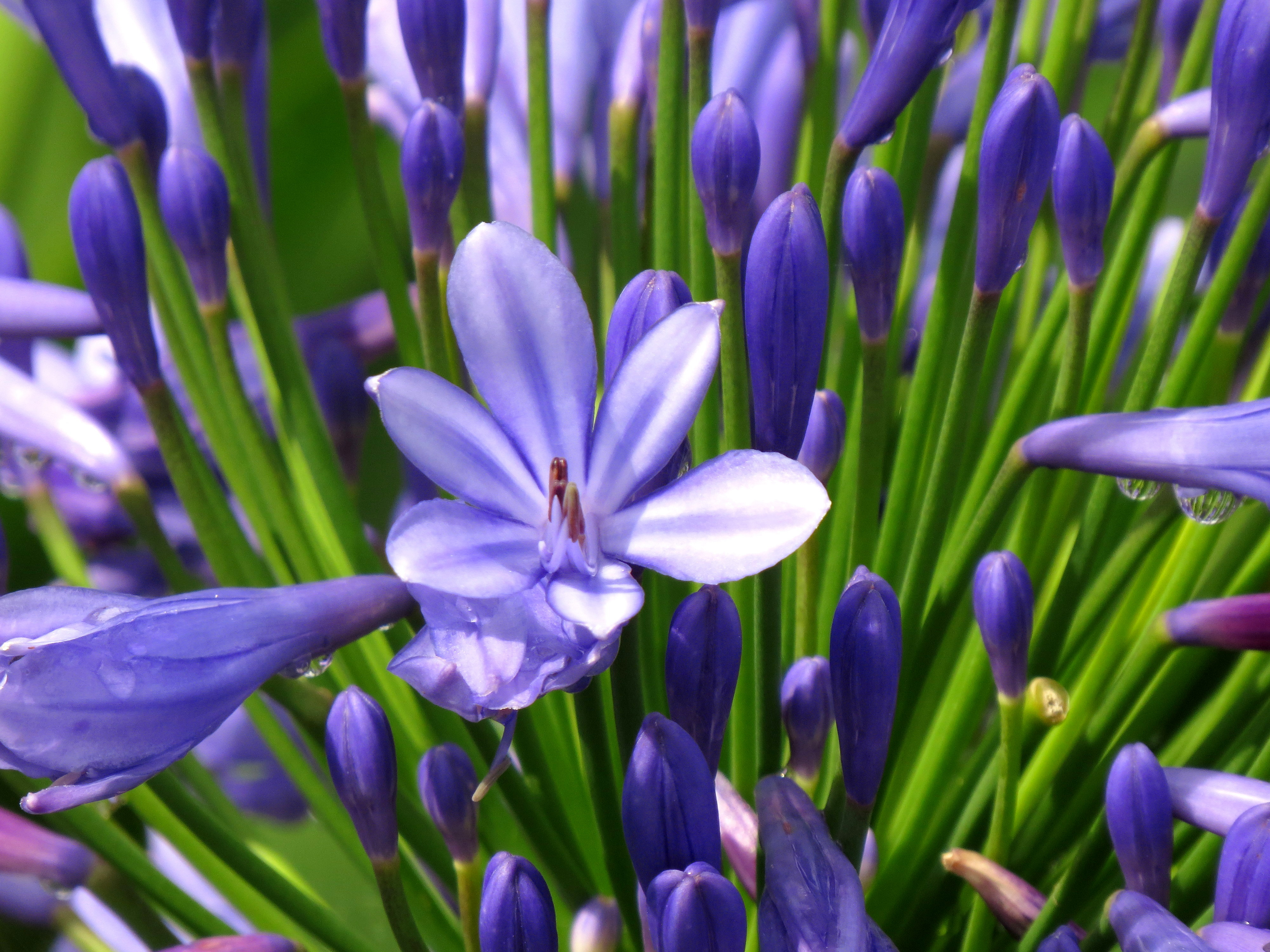
Flower closeup

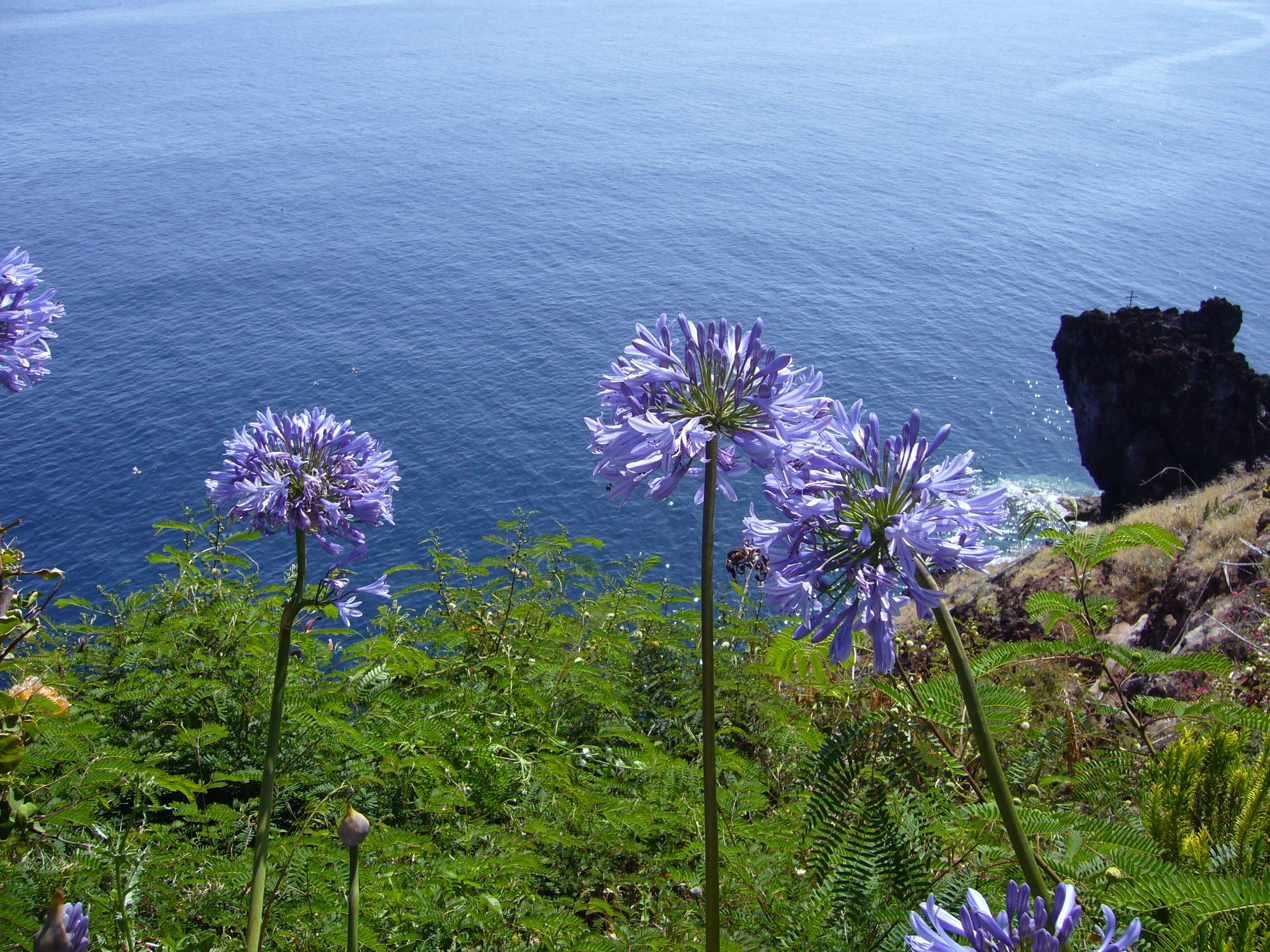
Growing on a cliff in Funchal, Madeira

== See also ==
- Agapanthus in New Zealand
- List of plants known as lily
