= Frances Margaret Leighton =

South African botanist (1909–2006)

- Born: 8 March 1909; King William's Town
- Died: 8 January 2006 (aged 96)
- Education: Rhodes University
- Scientific career
- Fields: Botany
- Author abbrev. (botany): F.M.Leight.

Frances Margaret Leighton (8 March 1909 – 8 January 2006) was a South African botanist and educator. After graduating from Rhodes University with her M.Sc degree in 1931, she worked at the Bolus Herbarium until 1947. Her primary research interests were focused on monocots, and her work impacted the Ornithogalum and Agapanthus.

Leighton married fellow botanist William Edwyn Isaac in 1936, and the couple had three children. In the 1950s, Leighton was politically active in the Black Sash movement, protesting against Apartheid. After moving to Nairobi in 1961, she studied sea grasses along the East African coast. Leighton and her husband eventually retired to Mornington Peninsula in Australia, where Leighton became involved with community environmental movements and was elected an honorary botanist by the 'Society for the Protection of Indigenous Flora and Fauna of Australia'.

== Biography ==
Frances was born in King William's Town and educated at Rhodes University between 1927 and 1931. She graduated with an M.Sc., subsequently joining the staff of the Bolus Herbarium in 1931 and remaining until 1947. Her primary interest was the monocots, leading to a revision of Ornithogalum (1944-5) and Agapanthus, and monographs published on the two taxa.

At the Bolus Herbarium she met William Edwyn Isaac, a young Welsh botanist, whom she married in 1936 - a union that lasted until his death in 1995. William, a marine botanist, published "Marine biological research and the South African fishing industry" in 1943, and delivered his inaugural lecture, "Plants of the Sea", before the University of Cape Town in April 1955. The couple had three children - Rhys and Glynn, twin sons born in 1937, and a daughter in 1948. Rhys won the 1983 Pulitzer Prize for History for his book "The Transformation of Virginia, 1740-1790". Frances Leighton also taught at a school in South Africa. By the late 1950s she had become politically active and joined the Black Sash movement, one of the first white organisations to protest against Apartheid.

Prof. William Edwyn Isaac during his Kenya days

In 1961 the couple moved to Nairobi. William became the foundation professor of botany at the University of Nairobi on the eve of Kenya's independence, and wrote "Marine botany of the Kenya coast" in 1967. Frances embarked on a study of seagrasses of the East African coast, and volunteered to manage an adult-literacy and life-skills program for women, involving teaching in a hostel housing prostitutes.

On retirement, and with two of their three children living in Australia, William and Frances followed and settled in Blairgowrie on the Mornington Peninsula, their home for the next 35 years. Frances became closely involved in the welfare of people in the area, and was given to informal lectures on the seagrass ecology of Port Phillip Bay and the dangers of alien species invading the Australian coastal scrub. She soon sought out other retired but active people, joined the 'Friends of the Rosebud Library Society' in Rosebud, Victoria, and later became its president. With another activist she started a neighbourhood environmental group aimed at maintaining country roads and planting indigenous species along the verges. She was elected honorary botanist within the 'Society for the Protection of Indigenous Flora and Fauna of Australia'. With the founding of the University of the Third Age, she became one of its staunchest supporters. She died in Blairgowrie, Victoria, aged 96.

Plants named in her honour include Delosperma leightoniae Lavis, Mesembryanthemum leightoniae L.Bolus, Lampranthus francesiae H.E.K.Hartmann, Bergeranthus leightoniae L.Bolus.

== James Leighton ==
Frances Leighton's uncle, James Leighton FRHS (19 January 1855 Kincardine O'Neil – 22 January 1930 King William's Town) was a gardener at Kew 1878–1880, 1881–1887 curator of the Botanical Gardens in King William's Town, at the same time developing his own nursery, 1888–1922 he was a town councillor, 1910–11 he was mayor of King William's Town. He was enthusiastic about paper-making and knowledgeable about the fibres from indigenous and exotic plants that were suitable for paper.

The King William's Town Horticultural Society started in 1898. A Cape Mercury editorial, in a lengthy report on its formation, called its committee "men of standing in the community, practical and experienced." This was certainly the case. Amongst its members were the editor of the Daily Watchman, the District Forest Officer, some of the leading merchants, the Curator of the Botanical Gardens and a nurseryman (who was also a municipal councillor viz. James Leighton). The major thrust of the society's activities appears to have been the holding of shows. The first of these, the Flower Show and Art Exhibition, was held in April 1898. Amongst the categories adjudicated were flowers, needlework, potplants, cookery, art and wood carving. Talks were occasionally given, such as the one by James Leighton on "Practical Hints at the Various Methods of Plant Propagation" . But the society was not quite as active as its members intended when they initiated it. The regular talks they envisaged do not seem to have materialised as nothing else appeared in the Press.

— Webb, 1993

== Publications ==
- "The genus Agapanthus L'Heriter - Monograph of Agapanthus, with 8 colour plates by Miss W.F. Barker". Journal of South African Botany. Supplementary Volume No. 4. Cape Town: National Botanic Gardens. 1965.
