= Impepho =

Traditional South African medicinal herbs

Impepho or imphepho is a vernacular name for various herbs in the genus Helichrysum used in South Africa for traditional cultural, medicinal, and spiritual purposes. It is commonly burned as incense, but may also be prepared as an infusion or decoction for medicinal use. Species known as impepho include Helichrysum cymosum, Helichrysum epapposum, Helichrysum gymnocomum, Helichrysum natalitium, Helichrysum nudifolium, Helichrysum odoratissimum, and Helichrysum petiolare.

The name impepho is used in isiXhosa, spoken predominantly in the Eastern Cape, while isiZulu speakers from KwaZulu-Natal use imphepho.

== Uses ==
Impepho is primarily associated with prayer, ritual cleansing, and the veneration of ancestors. Burning impepho is understood as the primary means of establishing communication between the living and ancestral spirits. The smoke is believed to carry prayers and messages to the ancestors and to create the conditions under which a ritual can properly take place. According to academic Mpumelelo Ntshangase of the University of KwaZulu-Natal, "impepho is a way of communicating with the ancestors and it must be burned before most ceremonies can be performed ... without imphepho, traditional rituals cannot be performed."

In sangoma practice, impepho is burned during consultations, ukuthwasa (initiation rites), divination sessions, and ceremonies, particularly when an ancestral spirit is believed to be restless or demanding. Practitioners believe the smoke enables the sangoma to see the cause of a person's illness through the ancestor's eyes. The herb is also eaten by sangoma initiates in some traditions.

Some churches in South Africa, such as the iBandla lamaNazaretha (Shembe Church), have integrated impepho into Christian worship, with members encouraged to burn it during prayer.

In Lesotho, impepho is burned to fumigate the rooms of sick people.
