= September 28 =

September 28 this year in various calendars
- Monday, 28 September 2026
Akan	Nkyidwo
Armenian	10 Sahmi 1476
Aztec	Nēmontēmi 1, 2 Ātl
Babylonian	15 Ululu, 2337 SE
Balinese pawukon	Luang, Pepet, Kajeng, Jaya, Pon, Urukung, Coma of Ugu, Kala, Gigis, Pati
Bengali	13 Ashshin, BS 1433
Chinese	Yin Wood Snake・Roof Mansion; Fire Horse Year, Month 8, Day 18 (Qiufen, 10 days until Hanlu)
Common Era	28 September 2026 CE
Coptic	18 Thout, AM 1743
Egyptian	15 Mechir, 2775 NE
Ethiopian	18 Maskaram, 2019 Amätä Məhrät
French Republican	Décade I, Sextidi de Vendémiaire de l'Année 235 de la République
Gregorian	28 September, AD 2026
Hebrew	17 Tishrei, AM 5787
Hindu	Revatī・Dhruva; Solar: 12 Āśvina, 1948 SE; Lunisolar: Dvitīyā, Kṛishna pakṣa of Bhādrapada, 2083 VE; Rāudra・5127 KY・1,872,846
Icelandic	Mánudagur, 5 Haustmánuður 2026
Islamic	15 Rabi' al-thani, AH 1448 (using tabular method)
ISO week date	2026-W40-1
Japanese	18 Hazuki, Reiwa 8 (Shūbun, 10 days until Kanro)
Julian	15 September, AD 2026 (AM 7534)
Julian day	2461312
Korean	18 Dakdal, 4359 DE
Maya	13.0.13.17.9; 2 Yax, 2 Muluc
Roman	ante diem XVII Kalendas Octobres, MMDCCLXXIX AUC
Solar Hijri	6 Mehr, SH 1405
Tibetan	17 khrums, me pho rta 2153 or 1772 or 1000

<<	September					>>
Su	Mo	Tu	We	Th	Fr	Sa
		1	2	3	4	5
6	7	8	9	10	11	12
13	14	15	16	17	18	19
20	21	22	23	24	25	26
27	28	29	30
2026

September 28 in recent years
2026 (Monday)
2025 (Sunday)
2024 (Saturday)
2023 (Thursday)
2022 (Wednesday)
2021 (Tuesday)
2020 (Monday)
2019 (Saturday)
2018 (Friday)
2017 (Thursday)

September 28 is the 271st day of the year (272nd in leap years) in the Gregorian calendar; 94 days remain until the end of the year.

== Events ==
=== Pre-1600 ===
- 48 BC – Pompey disembarks at Pelusium upon arriving in Egypt, whereupon he is assassinated by order of King Ptolemy XIII.
- 235 – Pope Pontian resigns. He is exiled to the mines of Sardinia, along with Hippolytus of Rome.
- 351 – Constantius II defeats the usurper Magnentius.
- 365 – Roman usurper Procopius bribes two legions passing by Constantinople, and proclaims himself emperor.
- 935 – Duke Wenceslaus I of Bohemia is murdered by a group of nobles led by his brother Boleslaus I, who succeeds him.
- 995 – Boleslaus II, Duke of Bohemia, kills most members of the rival Slavník dynasty.
- 1066 – William the Conqueror lands in England, beginning the Norman conquest.
- 1106 – King Henry I of England defeats his brother Robert Curthose at the Battle of Tinchebray.
- 1213 – Queen consort Gertrude of Merania is assassinated by a group of Hungarian lords.
- 1238 – King James I of Aragon conquers Valencia from the Moors. Shortly thereafter, he proclaims himself king of Valencia.
- 1322 – Louis IV, Holy Roman Emperor, defeats Frederick I of Austria in the Battle of Mühldorf.
- 1538 – Ottoman–Venetian War: The Ottoman Navy scores a decisive victory over a Holy League fleet in the Battle of Preveza.
- 1542 – Juan Rodríguez Cabrillo of Portugal arrives at what is now San Diego, California. He is the first European in California.

=== 1601–1900 ===
- 1644 – A Hospitaller galley squadron defeats an Ottoman convoy in the action of 28 September 1644.
- 1779 – American Revolution: Samuel Huntington is elected President of the Continental Congress, succeeding John Jay.
- 1781 – American Revolutionary War: French and American forces backed by a French fleet begin the siege of Yorktown.
- 1787 – The Congress of the Confederation votes to send the newly written United States Constitution to the state legislatures for approval.
- 1821 – The Declaration of Independence of the Mexican Empire is drafted. It will be made public on 13 October.
- 1844 – Oscar I of Sweden–Norway is crowned king of Sweden.
- 1867 – Toronto becomes the capital of Ontario, having also been the capital of Ontario's predecessors since 1796.
- 1868 – The Battle of Alcolea causes Queen Isabella II of Spain to flee to France.
- 1871 – The Brazilian Parliament passes a law that frees all children thereafter born to slaves, and all government-owned slaves.
- 1889 – The General Conference on Weights and Measures (CGPM) defines the length of a metre.
- 1892 – The first night game for American football takes place in a contest between Wyoming Seminary and Mansfield State Normal.

=== 1901–present ===
- 1901 – Philippine–American War: Filipino guerrillas kill more than forty American soldiers while losing 28 of their own.
- 1912 – The Ulster Covenant is signed by some 500,000 Ulster Unionists in opposition to the Third Irish Home Rule Bill.
- 1912 – Corporal Frank S. Scott of the United States Army becomes the first enlisted man to die in an airplane crash.
- 1918 – World War I: The Fifth Battle of Ypres begins.
- 1919 – Race riots begin in Omaha, Nebraska, United States.
- 1924 – The first aerial circumnavigation is completed by a team from the US Army.
- 1928 – Alexander Fleming notices a bacteria-killing mold growing in his laboratory, discovering what later became known as penicillin.
- 1939 – World War II: Nazi Germany and the Soviet Union agree on a division of Poland.
- 1939 – World War II: The siege of Warsaw comes to an end.
- 1941 – World War II: The Drama uprising against the Bulgarian occupation in northern Greece begins.
- 1941 – Ted Williams achieves a .406 batting average for the season, and becomes the last major league baseball player to bat .400 or better.
- 1944 – World War II: Soviet Army troops liberate Klooga concentration camp in Estonia.
- 1951 – CBS makes the first color televisions available for sale to the general public, but the product is discontinued less than a month later.
- 1958 – Fernando Rios, a Mexican tour guide in New Orleans, dies of injuries sustained in an incident of gay bashing.
- 1961 – A military coup in Damascus effectively ends the United Arab Republic, the union between Egypt and Syria.
- 1970 – Egyptian President Gamal Abdel Nasser dies of a heart attack in Cairo.
- 1973 – The ITT Building in New York City is bombed in protest at ITT's alleged involvement in the coup d'état in Chile.
- 1975 – The Spaghetti House siege, in which nine people are taken hostage, takes place in London.
- 1983 – John Pat, a 16-year old Aboriginal Australian boy, dies of injuries inflicted by four off-duty police officers in Roebourne, a catalyst to the Royal Commission into Aboriginal Deaths in Custody.
- 1986 – The Democratic Progressive Party becomes the first opposition party in Taiwan.
- 1992 – A Pakistan International Airlines flight crashes into a hill in Nepal, killing all 167 passengers and crew.
- 1994 – The cruise ferry MS Estonia sinks in the Baltic Sea, killing 852 people.
- 1995 – Bob Denard and a group of mercenaries take the islands of the Comoros in a coup.
- 1995 – Israeli Prime Minister Yitzhak Rabin and PLO Chairman Yasser Arafat sign the Interim Agreement on the West Bank and the Gaza Strip.
- 2000 – Al-Aqsa Intifada: Ariel Sharon visits Al-Aqsa Mosque known to Jews as the Temple Mount in Jerusalem.
- 2006 – Typhoon Xangsane passes over Manila after impacting parts of Southern Luzon and Eastern Visayas, becoming the strongest to affect the Philippine capital in 11 years.
- 2008 – Falcon 1 becomes the first privately developed liquid-fuel ground-launched vehicle to put a payload into orbit by the RatSat mission.
- 2008 – The Singapore Grand Prix is held as Formula One's inaugural night race, with Fernando Alonso winning the event. Almost a year later it was revealed that Alonso's team-mate Nelson Piquet Jr. had been ordered to crash his car to help bring out the safety car and give Alonso the advantage and win.
- 2009 – The military junta leading Guinea attacks a protest rally, killing or wounding 1,400 people.
- 2012 – Somali and African Union forces launch a coordinated assault on the Somali port of Kismayo to take back the city from al-Shabaab militants.
- 2012 – Sita Air Flight 601 crashes in Madhyapur Thimi, Nepal, killing all 19 passengers and crew.
- 2014 – The 2014 Hong Kong protests begin in response to restrictive political reforms imposed by the NPC in Beijing.
- 2016 – The 2016 South Australian blackout occurs, lasting up to three days in some areas.
- 2018 – The 7.5 M_{w} 2018 Sulawesi earthquake, which triggered a large tsunami, leaves 4,340 dead and 10,679 injured.
- 2022 – Hurricane Ian makes landfall in Cayo Costa State Park, Florida as a category four hurricane, killing 169 and doing $113 billion in damage, becoming Florida's costliest hurricane and the deadliest in 89 years.
- 2023 – The 2023 Rotterdam shootings occurred, during which two people were killed in a shooting and arson incident at a residence in Delfshaven, Rotterdam. Additionally, one person lost their life in a classroom at the Erasmus University Medical Center.

== Births ==
=== Pre-1600 ===
- 551 BC – Confucius, Chinese teacher, editor, politician, and philosopher of the Spring and Autumn period of Chinese history. (died 479 BC)
- 616 – Javanshir, King of Caucasian Albania (died 680)
- 1494 – Agnolo Firenzuola, Italian poet and playwright (died 1545)
- 1555 – Henri de La Tour d'Auvergne, Marshal of France (died 1623)
- 1573 – Théodore de Mayerne, Swiss physician (died 1654)

=== 1601–1900 ===
- 1605 – Ismaël Bullialdus, French astronomer and mathematician (died 1694)
- 1681 – Johann Mattheson, German composer, lexicographer, and diplomat (died 1764)
- 1705 – Henry Fox, 1st Baron Holland, English politician, Secretary of State for the Southern Department (died 1774)
- 1705 – Johann Peter Kellner, German organist and composer (died 1772)
- 1735 – Augustus FitzRoy, 3rd Duke of Grafton, English academic and politician, Prime Minister of Great Britain (died 1811)
- 1746 – William Jones, English-Welsh philologist and scholar (died 1794)
- 1765 – Frederick Christian II, Duke of Schleswig-Holstein-Sonderburg-Augustenburg (died 1814)
- 1803 – Prosper Mérimée, French archaeologist, historian, and author (died 1870)
- 1809 – Alvan Wentworth Chapman, American physician and botanist (died 1899)
- 1819 – Narcís Monturiol, Spanish engineer and publisher (died 1885)
- 1821 – Jonathan Clarkson Gibbs, American minister and politician (died 1874)
- 1823 – Alexandre Cabanel, French painter and educator (died 1889)
- 1824 – Francis Turner Palgrave, English poet and critic (died 1897)
- 1836 – Thomas Crapper, English plumber, invented the ballcock (died 1910)
- 1841 – Georges Clemenceau, French journalist, physician, and politician, 85th Prime Minister of France (died 1929)
- 1844 – Robert Stout, Scottish-New Zealand lawyer and politician, 13th Prime Minister of New Zealand (died 1930)
- 1852 – Henri Moissan, French chemist and academic, Nobel Prize laureate (died 1907)
- 1852 – Isis Pogson, British astronomer and meteorologist (died 1945)
- 1852 – John French, 1st Earl of Ypres, British Army officer (died 1925)
- 1856 – Kate Douglas Wiggin, American author and educator (died 1923)
- 1860 – Paul Ulrich Villard, French chemist and physicist (died 1934)
- 1865 – Amélie of Orléans, Queen Consort of Carlos I of Portugal (died 1951)
- 1866 – Oscar Tschirky, Swiss-born American restaurateur (died 1950)
- 1867 – Hiranuma Kiichirō, Japanese lawyer and politician, 35th Prime Minister of Japan (died 1952)
- 1867 – James Edwin Campbell, American educator, school administrator, newspaper editor, poet, and essayist (died 1896)
- 1870 – Florent Schmitt, French composer and critic (died 1958)
- 1877 – Albert Young, American boxer and promoter (died 1940)
- 1878 – Joseph Ruddy, American swimmer and water polo player (died 1962)
- 1881 – Pedro de Cordoba, American actor (died 1950)
- 1882 – Mart Saar, Estonian organist and composer (died 1963)
- 1883 – Albert Peyriguère, French priest, hermit and ethnologist (died 1959)
- 1885 – Emil Väre, Finnish wrestler, coach, and referee (died 1974)
- 1887 – Avery Brundage, American businessman, 5th President of the International Olympic Committee (died 1975)
- 1889 – Jack Fournier, American baseball player and coach (died 1973)
- 1890 – Florence Violet McKenzie, Australian electrical engineer (died 1982)
- 1892 – Elmer Rice, American playwright (died 1967)
- 1893 – Hilda Geiringer, Austrian mathematician (died 1973)
- 1893 – Giannis Skarimpas, Greek author, poet, and playwright (died 1984)
- 1898 – Carl Clauberg, German Nazi physician (died 1957)
- 1898 – Mijo Mirković, Croatian economist and author (died 1963)
- 1900 – Isabel Pell, American socialite, fought as part of the French Resistance during WWII (died 1951)

=== 1901–present ===
- 1901 – William S. Paley, American broadcaster, founded CBS (died 1990)
- 1901 – Ed Sullivan, American television host (died 1974)
- 1903 – Haywood S. Hansell, American general (died 1988)
- 1905 – Max Schmeling, German boxer (died 2005)
- 1907 – Heikki Savolainen, Finnish gymnast and physician (died 1997)
- 1907 – Bhagat Singh, Indian activist (died 1931)
- 1909 – Al Capp, American author and illustrator (died 1979)
- 1910 – Diosdado Macapagal, Filipino lawyer and politician, 9th President of the Philippines (died 1997)
- 1910 – Wenceslao Vinzons, Filipino lawyer and politician (died 1942)
- 1913 – Warja Honegger-Lavater, Swiss illustrator (died 2007)
- 1913 – Alice Marble, American tennis player (died 1990)
- 1914 – Maria Franziska von Trapp, Austrian-American refugee and singer (died 2014)
- 1915 – Ethel Rosenberg, American spy (died 1953)
- 1916 – Peter Finch, English-Australian actor (died 1977)
- 1916 – Olga Lepeshinskaya, Ukrainian-Russian ballerina and educator (died 2008)
- 1917 – Wee Chong Jin, Singaporean judge (died 2005)
- 1918 – Ángel Labruna, Argentinian footballer and manager (died 1983)
- 1918 – Arnold Stang, American actor (died 2009)
- 1919 – Doris Singleton, American actress (died 2012)
- 1922 – Liv Dommersnes, Norwegian actress (died 2014)
- 1922 – Larry Munson, American sportscaster (died 2011)
- 1922 – Jules Sedney, Prime Minister of Suriname (died 2020)
- 1923 – Tuli Kupferberg, American singer, poet, and writer (died 2010)
- 1923 – John Scott, 9th Duke of Buccleuch, Scottish captain and politician, Lord Lieutenant of Selkirkshire (died 2007)
- 1923 – William Windom, American actor (died 2012)
- 1924 – Rudolf Barshai, Russian-Swiss viola player and conductor (died 2010)
- 1924 – Marcello Mastroianni, Italian-French actor and singer (died 1996)
- 1925 – Seymour Cray, American computer scientist, founded the CRAY Computer Company (died 1996)
- 1925 – Cromwell Everson, South African composer (died 1991)
- 1925 – Martin David Kruskal, American physicist and mathematician (died 2006)
- 1926 – Jerry Clower, American soldier, comedian, and author (died 1998)
- 1926 – Bonnie Leman, American art historian, writer, and publisher of Quilter's Newsletter Magazine (died 2010)
- 1928 – Koko Taylor, American singer (died 2009)
- 1929 – Lata Mangeshkar, Indian playback singer and composer (died 2022)
- 1930 – Tommy Collins, American country music singer-songwriter (died 2000)
- 1930 – Immanuel Wallerstein, American sociologist, author, and academic (died 2019)
- 1932 – Jeremy Isaacs, Scottish screenwriter and producer
- 1932 – Víctor Jara, Chilean singer-songwriter, poet, and director (died 1973)
- 1933 – Joe Benton, English soldier and politician
- 1933 – Miguel Ortiz Berrocal, Spanish sculptor and educator (died 2006)
- 1933 – Johnny "Country" Mathis, American singer-songwriter (died 2011)
- 1934 – Brigitte Bardot, French actress and animal rights activist (died 2025)
- 1935 – Bruce Crampton, Australian golfer
- 1935 – David Hannay, Baron Hannay of Chiswick, English diplomat, British Permanent Representative to the United Nations
- 1935 – Ronald Lacey, English actor (died 1991)
- 1936 – Emmett Chapman, American guitarist, invented the Chapman Stick (died 2021)
- 1936 – Eddie Lumsden, Australian rugby league player (died 2019)
- 1936 – Robert Wolders, Dutch television actor (died 2018)
- 1937 – Alice Mahon, English trade union leader and politician (died 2022)
- 1937 – Glenn Sutton, American country music songwriter and record producer (died 2007)
- 1938 – Ben E. King, American singer-songwriter and producer (died 2015)
- 1939 – Stuart Kauffman, American biologist and academic
- 1941 – David Lewis, American philosopher and academic (died 2001)
- 1941 – Edmund Stoiber, German lawyer and politician, Minister President of Bavaria
- 1941 – Charley Taylor, American football player (died 2022)
- 1942 – Pierre Clémenti, French actor, director, producer, and screenwriter (died 1999)
- 1942 – Edward "Little Buster" Forehand, American singer-songwriter and guitarist (died 2006)
- 1943 – Warren Lieberfarb, American businessman
- 1943 – George W. S. Trow, American novelist, playwright, and critic (died 2006)
- 1943 – Nick St. Nicholas, German-Canadian bass player
- 1944 – Richie Karl, American golfer
- 1944 – Marcia Muller, American journalist and author
- 1945 – Marielle Goitschel, French skier
- 1945 – Manolis Rasoulis, Greek singer-songwriter and journalist (died 2011)
- 1945 – Fusako Shigenobu, Japanese activist, founded the Japanese Red Army
- 1946 – Tom Bower, English journalist and author
- 1946 – Jeffrey Jones, American actor
- 1946 – Majid Khan, Indian-Pakistani cricketer
- 1947 – Bob Carr, Australian journalist and politician, 37th Australian Minister of Foreign Affairs
- 1947 – Sheikh Hasina, Bangladeshi politician, 10th Prime Minister of Bangladesh
- 1947 – Jon Snow, English journalist and academic
- 1947 – Rhonda Hughes, American mathematician and academic
- 1949 – Jim Henshaw, Canadian actor, producer, and screenwriter
- 1949 – Vernee Watson-Johnson, American actress
- 1950 – Paul Burgess, English drummer
- 1950 – Christina Hoff Sommers, American author and philosopher
- 1950 – John Sayles, American novelist, director, and screenwriter
- 1951 – Jim Diamond, Scottish singer-songwriter and musician (died 2015)
- 1952 – Christopher Buckley, American satirical novelist
- 1952 – Efthimis Kioumourtzoglou, Greek basketball player and coach
- 1952 – Sylvia Kristel, Dutch model and actress (died 2012)
- 1952 – Andy Ward, English drummer
- 1953 – Otmar Hasler, Liechtensteiner educator and politician, 11th Prime Minister of Liechtenstein
- 1954 – Steve Largent, American football player and politician
- 1954 – George Lynch, American guitarist and songwriter
- 1954 – John Scott, English rugby player
- 1954 – Margot Wallström, Swedish politician and diplomat, 42nd Swedish Minister for Foreign Affairs
- 1955 – Stéphane Dion, Canadian sociologist and politician, 15th Canadian Minister of the Environment
- 1955 – Mercy Manci, Xhosa sangoma and HIV activist from South Africa
- 1955 – Kenny Kirkland, American pianist (died 1998)
- 1957 – Bill Cassidy, American politician and physician
- 1959 – Laura Bruce, American artist
- 1959 – Ron Fellows, Canadian race car driver
- 1960 – Gary Ayres, Australian footballer and coach
- 1960 – Tom Byrum, American golfer
- 1960 – Frank Hammerschlag, German footballer and manager
- 1960 – Gus Logie, Trinidadian cricketer
- 1960 – Kamlesh Patel, Baron Patel of Bradford, English politician
- 1960 – Jennifer Rush, American singer-songwriter
- 1960 – Socrates Villegas, Filipino archbishop
- 1961 – Helen Grant, English lawyer and politician, Minister for Sport and the Olympics
- 1961 – Gregory Jbara, American actor and singer
- 1961 – Quentin Kawānanakoa, American lawyer and politician
- 1961 – Anne White, American tennis player
- 1962 – Grant Fuhr, Canadian ice hockey player and coach
- 1962 – Laurie Rinker, American golfer
- 1962 – Dietmar Schacht, German footballer and manager
- 1962 – Chuck Taylor, American journalist
- 1963 – Steve Blackman, American wrestler and martial artist
- 1963 – Érik Comas, French race car driver
- 1963 – Johnny Dawkins, American basketball player and coach
- 1963 – Greg Weisman, American voice actor, producer, and screenwriter
- 1964 – Claudio Borghi, Argentinian footballer and manager
- 1964 – Gregor Fisken, Scottish race car driver
- 1964 – Janeane Garofalo, American comedian, actress, and screenwriter
- 1964 – Paul Jewell, English footballer and manager
- 1964 – Mārtiņš Roze, Latvian lawyer and politician (died 2012)
- 1965 – B.G., the Prince of Rap, American rapper (died 2023)
- 1966 – Scott Adams, American football player (died 2013)
- 1966 – Maria Canals-Barrera, Cuban-American actress
- 1966 – Puri Jagannadh, Indian director, producer, and screenwriter
- 1967 – Mira Sorvino, American actress
- 1967 – Moon Zappa, American actress and author
- 1968 – Francois Botha, South African boxer and mixed martial artist
- 1968 – Mika Häkkinen, Finnish race car driver
- 1968 – Trish Keenan, English singer-songwriter and guitarist (died 2011)
- 1968 – Sean Levert, American R&B singer-songwriter and actor (died 2008)
- 1968 – Rob Moroso, American race car driver (died 1990)
- 1968 – Naomi Watts, English-Australian actress and producer
- 1969 – Kerri Chandler, electronic music producer and DJ
- 1969 – Marcel Dost, Dutch decathlete
- 1969 – Ben Greenman, American journalist and author
- 1969 – Piper Kerman, American author and memoirist
- 1969 – Éric Lapointe, Canadian singer-songwriter and keyboard player
- 1969 – Sascha Maassen, German race car driver
- 1969 – Angus Robertson, Scottish politician
- 1969 – Nico Vaesen, Belgian footballer
- 1970 – Kimiko Date, Japanese tennis player
- 1970 – Mike DeJean, American baseball player
- 1970 – Gualter Salles, Brazilian race car driver
- 1971 – Joseph Arthur, American singer-songwriter and guitarist
- 1971 – George Eustice, English lawyer and politician
- 1971 – Braam van Straaten, South African rugby player
- 1971 – Alan Wright, English footballer and manager
- 1972 – Leila McKinnon, Iranian-Australian journalist and television host
- 1972 – Dita Von Teese, American model and dancer
- 1973 – Brian Rafalski, American ice hockey player
- 1974 – Marco Di Loreto, Italian footballer and manager
- 1974 – Mariya Kiselyova, Russian swimmer
- 1974 – Joonas Kolkka, Finnish footballer and coach
- 1974 – Shane Webcke, Australian rugby league player and coach
- 1975 – Stuart Clark, Australian cricketer and manager
- 1975 – Isamu Jordan, American journalist and academic (died 2013)
- 1975 – Lenny Krayzelburg, Russian-American swimmer
- 1976 – Fedor Emelianenko, Russian mixed martial artist and politician
- 1976 – Bonzi Wells, American basketball player
- 1977 – Pak Se-ri, South Korean golfer
- 1977 – Young Jeezy, American rapper
- 1978 – Peter Cambor, American actor
- 1978 – Ben Edmondson, Australian cricketer
- 1979 – Bam Margera, American skateboarder, actor, and stuntman
- 1979 – Taki Tsan, American-Greek rapper and producer
- 1980 – Marlon Parmer, American basketball player
- 1981 – Greg Anderson, American pianist and composer
- 1981 – Willy Caballero, Argentine footballer
- 1981 – José Calderón, Spanish basketball player
- 1981 – Jorge Guagua, Ecuadorian footballer
- 1981 – Jerrika Hinton, American actress
- 1981 – Iracema Trevisan, Brazilian bass player
- 1982 – Aleksandr Anyukov, Russian footballer
- 1982 – Abhinav Bindra, Indian target shooter
- 1982 – Ray Emery, Canadian ice hockey player (died 2018)
- 1982 – Ranbir Kapoor, Indian actor and director
- 1982 – Nolwenn Leroy, French singer-songwriter and actress
- 1982 – Emeka Okafor, American basketball player
- 1982 – Dustin Penner, Canadian ice hockey player
- 1982 – Aivar Rehemaa, Estonian skier
- 1982 – Anderson Varejão, Brazilian basketball player
- 1982 – St. Vincent, American singer-songwriter and guitarist
- 1983 – Stefan Moore, English footballer
- 1983 – John Schwalger, New Zealand rugby player
- 1984 – Jenny Omnichord, Canadian singer-songwriter
- 1984 – Luke Pomersbach, Australian cricketer
- 1984 – Naim Terbunja, Kosovan-Swedish boxer
- 1984 – Melody Thornton, American singer-songwriter and dancer
- 1984 – Mathieu Valbuena, French footballer
- 1984 – Ryan Zimmerman, American baseball player
- 1985 – Shindong, South Korean singer-songwriter and dancer
- 1985 – Alina Ibragimova, Russian-English violinist
- 1986 – Andrés Guardado, Mexican footballer
- 1986 – Meskerem Legesse, Ethiopian runner (died 2013)
- 1986 – Daniel Platzman, American musician
- 1986 – Dominic Waters, American basketball player
- 1987 – Pierre Becken, German footballer
- 1987 – Gary Deegan, Irish footballer
- 1987 – Hilary Duff, American singer-songwriter and actress
- 1987 – Chloë Hanslip, English violinist
- 1987 – Viktoria Leks, Estonian high jumper
- 1988 – Marin Čilić, Croatian tennis player
- 1988 – Esmée Denters, Dutch singer-songwriter
- 1988 – Jason Jordan, American wrestler
- 1988 – Olivia Jordan, American actress, model, television host, and beauty pageant titleholder
- 1988 – Hana Mae Lee, American actress, model, and fashion designer
- 1988 – Aleks Vrteski, Australian footballer
- 1988 – Worakls, French DJ and electronic musician
- 1989 – Çağla Büyükakçay, Turkish tennis player
- 1989 – Darius Johnson-Odom, American basketball player
- 1989 – Mark Randall, English footballer
- 1990 – Phoenix Battye, Australian rugby player
- 1990 – Kirsten Prout, Canadian-American actress
- 1991 – Eddie Rosario, Puerto Rican baseball player
- 1991 – Elvyonn Bailey, American sprinter
- 1992 – Khem Birch, Canadian basketball player
- 1992 – Keir Gilchrist, Canadian actor and musician
- 1992 – Alex Landi, American actor
- 1992 – Paula Ormaechea, Argentine tennis player
- 1992 – Adam Thompson, English-Northern Irish footballer
- 1992 – Kōko Tsurumi, Japanese gymnast
- 1993 – Jodie Williams, English sprinter
- 1995 – Juancho Hernangómez, Spanish basketball player
- 1995 – Caleb Martin, American basketball player
- 1995 – Cody Martin, American basketball player
- 1995 – Jason Williams, English footballer
- 1996 – Aiden Moffat, British race car driver
- 1998 – Panna Udvardy, Hungarian tennis player
- 1999 – Kayla Day, American tennis player
- 2000 – Frankie Jonas, American actor, singer, and songwriter
- 2004 – Isack Hadjar, French-Algerian racing driver

== Deaths ==
=== Pre-1600 ===
- 48 BC – Pompey, Roman general and politician (born 106 BC)
- 135 – Rabbi Akiva, Jewish sage, martyr. (born c. 50)
- 782 – Leoba, Anglo-Saxon nun (born c. 710)
- 935 – Wenceslaus I, duke of Bohemia (born c. 907)
- 980 – Minamoto no Hiromasa, Japanese nobleman (born 918)
- 1197 – Henry VI, Holy Roman Emperor (born 1165)
- 1213 – Gertrude of Merania, queen consort of Hungary (born 1185)
- 1330 – Elizabeth of Bohemia, queen consort of Bohemia (born 1292)
- 1429 – Cymburgis of Masovia, duchess consort of Austria (born 1394)
- 1582 – George Buchanan, Scottish historian and scholar (born 1506)
- 1596 – Margaret Clifford, countess of Derby (born 1540)

=== 1601–1900 ===
- 1618 – Josuah Sylvester, English poet and translator (born 1563)
- 1687 – Francis Turretin, Swiss-Italian theologian and academic (born 1623)
- 1694 – Gabriel Mouton, French mathematician and theologian (born 1618)
- 1702 – Robert Spencer, 2nd Earl of Sunderland, French-English lawyer and politician, Lord President of the Council (born 1640)
- 1742 – Jean Baptiste Massillon, French bishop (born 1663)
- 1805 – Christoph Franz von Buseck, Prince-Bishop of Bamberg (born 1724)
- 1829 – Nikolay Raevsky, Russian general and politician (born 1771)
- 1844 – Pyotr Aleksandrovich Tolstoy, Russian general and politician (born 1769)
- 1859 – Carl Ritter, German geographer and academic (born 1779)
- 1873 – Émile Gaboriau, French journalist and author (born 1832)
- 1882 – Amunda Kolderup, Norwegian opera singer (born 1846)
- 1891 – Herman Melville, American author and poet (born 1819)
- 1893 – Annie Feray Mutrie, British painter (born 1826)
- 1895 – Louis Pasteur, French chemist and microbiologist (born 1822)
- 1899 – Giovanni Segantini, Austrian painter (born 1858)

=== 1901–present ===
- 1902 – John Marks Moore, American politician and attorney (born 1853)
- 1904 – Lafcadio Hearn, Greek-Japanese historian and author (born 1850)
- 1914 – Richard Warren Sears, American businessman, co-founded Sears (born 1863)
- 1915 – Saitō Hajime, Japanese samurai (born 1844)
- 1918 – Georg Simmel, German sociologist and philosopher (born 1858)
- 1918 – Freddie Stowers, American soldier, Medal of Honor recipient (born 1896)
- 1920 – Yu Gwan-sun, Korean independence activist (born 1902)
- 1925 – Paul Vermoyal, French actor (born 1888)
- 1935 – William Kennedy Dickson, French-Scottish actor, director, and producer, invented the Kinetoscope (born 1860)
- 1938 – Charles Duryea, American engineer and businessman, founded the Duryea Motor Wagon Company (born 1861)
- 1941 – Marion Miley, American golfer, ranked No. 1 in the United States (born 1914)
- 1943 – Sam Ruben, American chemist and academic (born 1913)
- 1943 – Filippo Illuminato, Italian partisan, Gold Medal of Military Valour (born 1930)
- 1949 – Archbishop Chrysanthus of Athens (born 1881)
- 1953 – Edwin Hubble, American astronomer and scholar (born 1889)
- 1956 – William Boeing, American businessman, founded the Boeing Company (born 1881)
- 1957 – Luis Cluzeau Mortet, Uruguayan violinist and composer (born 1888)
- 1959 – Rudolf Caracciola, German race car driver (born 1901)
- 1962 – Roger Nimier, French soldier and author (born 1925)
- 1964 – Harpo Marx, American comedian, actor, and singer (born 1888)
- 1966 – André Breton, French author and poet (born 1896)
- 1970 – John Dos Passos, American novelist, poet, essayist, and playwright (born 1896)
- 1970 – Gamal Abdel Nasser, Egyptian colonel and politician, 2nd President of Egypt (born 1918)
- 1978 – Pope John Paul I (born 1912)
- 1979 – John Herbert Chapman, Canadian physicist and engineer (born 1921)
- 1981 – Rómulo Betancourt, Venezuelan journalist and politician, President of Venezuela (born 1908)
- 1982 – Mabel Albertson, American actress (born 1901)
- 1984 – Cihad Baban, Turkish journalist, author, and politician (born 1911)
- 1989 – Ferdinand Marcos, Filipino lawyer and politician, 10th President of the Philippines (born 1917)
- 1990 – Larry O'Brien, American businessman and politician, 57th United States Postmaster General (born 1917)
- 1991 – Miles Davis, American trumpet player, composer, and bandleader (born 1926)
- 1993 – Peter De Vries, American editor and novelist (born 1910)
- 1993 – Alexander A. Drabik, American sergeant (born 1910)
- 1994 – Urmas Alender, Estonian singer (born 1953)
- 1994 – José Francisco Ruiz Massieu, Mexican lawyer and politician, 6th Governor of Guerrero (born 1946)
- 1994 – Harry Saltzman, Canadian production manager and producer (born 1915)
- 1994 – K. A. Thangavelu, Indian film actor and comedian (born 1917)
- 1999 – Escott Reid, Canadian academic and diplomat (born 1905)
- 2000 – Pierre Trudeau, Canadian journalist, lawyer, and politician, 15th Prime Minister of Canada (born 1919)
- 2002 – Patsy Mink, American lawyer and politician (born 1927)
- 2002 – Hartland Molson, Canadian captain and politician (born 1907)
- 2003 – Althea Gibson, American tennis player and golfer (born 1927)
- 2003 – Elia Kazan, American director, producer, and screenwriter (born 1909)
- 2003 – George Odlum, Saint Lucian politician and diplomat (born 1934)
- 2004 – Geoffrey Beene, American fashion designer (born 1924)
- 2005 – Constance Baker Motley, American lawyer, judge, and politician (born 1921)
- 2007 – René Desmaison, French mountaineer (born 1930)
- 2007 – Wally Parks, American businessman, founded the National Hot Rod Association (born 1913)
- 2009 – Guillermo Endara, Panamanian lawyer and politician, 32nd President of Panama (born 1936)
- 2009 – Ulf Larsson, Swedish actor and director (born 1956)
- 2010 – Kurt Albert, German mountaineer and photographer (born 1954)
- 2010 – Arthur Penn, American director and producer (born 1922)
- 2010 – Dolores Wilson, American soprano and actress (born 1928)
- 2012 – Avraham Adan, Israeli general (born 1926)
- 2012 – Chris Economaki, American journalist and sportscaster (born 1920)
- 2012 – Brajesh Mishra, Indian politician and diplomat, 1st Indian National Security Advisor (born 1928)
- 2013 – James Emanuel, American-French poet and scholar (born 1921)
- 2013 – Jonathan Fellows-Smith, South African cricketer and rugby player (born 1932)
- 2013 – George Amon Webster, American singer and pianist (born 1945)
- 2014 – Dannie Abse, Welsh physician, poet, and author (born 1923)
- 2014 – Joseph H. Alexander, American colonel and historian (born 1938)
- 2014 – Sheila Faith, English dentist and politician (born 1928)
- 2014 – Tim Rawlings, English footballer and manager (born 1932)
- 2014 – Petr Skoumal, Czech pianist and composer (born 1938)
- 2015 – Alexander Faris, Irish composer and conductor (born 1921)
- 2015 – Walter Dale Miller, American rancher and politician, 29th Governor of South Dakota (born 1925)
- 2015 – Ignacio Zoco, Spanish footballer (born 1939)
- 2016 – Agnes Nixon, American television writer and director (born 1922)
- 2016 – Gary Glasberg, American television writer and producer (born 1966)
- 2016 – Shimon Peres, Polish-Israeli statesman and politician, 9th President of Israel (born 1923)
- 2016 – Gloria Naylor, American novelist (born 1950)
- 2017 – Daniel Pe'er, Israeli television host and newsreader (born 1943)
- 2018 – Predrag Ejdus, Serbian actor (born 1947)
- 2019 – José José, Mexican musician and singer (born 1948)
- 2022 – Coolio, American rapper (born 1963)
- 2024 – Winfield Dunn, American politician, 43rd Governor of Tennessee (born 1927)
- 2024 – Drake Hogestyn, American actor (born 1953)
- 2024 – Kris Kristofferson, American singer, songwriter, and actor (born 1936)
- 2026 – Siti Hasmah, Malaysian physician and civil servant (born 1926)

== Holidays and observances ==
- Christian feast day:
  - Aaron of Auxerre
  - Amalia Abad Casasempere
  - Annemund
  - Chariton the Confessor
  - Conval
  - Eustochium
  - Exuperius
  - Faustus of Riez
  - Leoba
  - Lorenzo Ruiz
  - Machan
  - Nykyta Budka
  - Paternus of Auch
  - Richard Rolle, Walter Hilton and Margery Kempe (Episcopal Church (USA))
  - Simón de Rojas
  - Wenceslas
  - September 28 (Eastern Orthodox liturgics).
- Czech Statehood Day (Czech Republic)
- Freedom from Hunger Day
- International Day for Universal Access to Information
- National Day of Awareness and Unity against Child Pornography (Philippines)
- Teachers' Day (Taiwan and Chinese-Filipino schools in the Philippines), ceremonies dedicated to Confucius are also observed.
- World Rabies Day (International)
