= Madumo, A Man Bewitched =

2000 non-fiction book by Adam Ashforth

Madumo, a Man Bewitched
- Cover of Madumo
- Author: Adam Ashforth
- Language: English
- Genre: Non-fiction, Anthropology
- Publisher: University of Chicago Press
- Publication date: June 15, 2000
- Publication place: United States
- Media type: Print Hardback
- Pages: 264 pp (first edition, hardback)
- ISBN: 0226029719 (first edition, hardback)

Madumo, a Man Bewitched is a 2000 non-fiction anthropology book written by Australian social scientist and professor Adam Ashforth.

== Synopsis ==
The book chronicles Ashforth's experiences with Madumo, a South African man that believes that witchcraft is to blame for his bad luck. Ashforth, who has been friends with Madumo for many years, agrees to help finance his exorcism and healing with an inyanga.

== Reception ==
Critical reception for Madumo has been positive, with Publishers Weekly calling the story was "compelling". Frank Salamone of Iona College praised the book, saying it was "a fine example of blurred genres and the way in which such an account can illuminate important cultural issues". Salon.com wrote that Madumo was "a warm, colorful book", citing Ashforth's credibility as a highlight of the book. The Village Voice praised the book's descriptions and social commentary.

Kirkus Reviews stated that the book was "a persuasive and interesting account that gets lost in the drawn-out and diffused story of an unorthodox healing". Suomen Antropologi expressed concern over Ashforth vocalizing Madumo's inner thoughts, saying "How can Ashforth know exactly what Madumo is thinking and the peculiar logic which informs his thoughts?"
