= Licorice plant =

Licorice plant is a common name for several plants and may refer to:

- Glycyrrhiza glabra, native to Europe and Asia and used in flavoring candy
- Helichrysum petiolare, native to southern Africa
