= Lockley =

Lockley is a surname. Notable people with the surname include:

- Addison Lockley (born 1991), rugby union player
- Albert Lockley (1873-1939), Welsh international footballer
- Andrew Lockley (born 1971), British special effects artist
- Benjamin Lockley (1720–1801), Philadelphia carpenter-architect, master builder and investor
- Fred Lockley (1871–1958), American journalist
- Harold Lockley (1916–2004), eminent Anglican priest
- John Lockley (born 1971), white South African
- Kate Lockley, television character
- Martin Lockley (1950–2023), English paleontologist
- Michael Lockley (born 1988), American former football player
- Ronald Lockley (1903–2000), Welsh ornithologist and naturalist
- Thomas Lockley (born 1978), British-Japanese professor of history and language

== See also ==
- Lockleys, a suburb of Adelaide, Australia
