= Amafufunyana =

Culture-bound syndrome

Amafufunyana is an unspecified culture-bound syndrome named by the traditional healers of the Xhosa people that relates to claims of demonic possession due to members of the Xhosa people exhibiting aberrant behavior and psychological concerns. After study, it was discovered that this term is directed toward people with varying types of schizophrenia. A similar term, ukuthwasa, is used to refer to positive types of claimed possession, though this event also involves those with schizophrenia. It has also found cultural usage among some groups of Zulu people.

The direct translation of the term amafufunyana is nerves and is a part of a much more complex cultural ideology connecting varying types of psychosis with religious, social, and recently psychiatric beliefs and activities. In a 1998 interview with Xhosa people with schizophrenia by Lund et al., it was determined that through interaction with scientists and psychological services, the preferred treatment for the cultural condition had shifted from relation to traditional healers to active psychiatric assessment.

== Claimed symptoms and causes ==
People who claim to have amafufunyana state that their symptoms include hearing "voices from their stomachs", speaking in another language or in a disturbing tone, and general agitation and possible violence. There is also the possibility of suicide being attempted.

One of the cultural beliefs for the cause is bewitchment from drinking a magic potion brewed from ants that have been feeding upon a buried dead body. General possession by malignant spirits is also believed. Among the Zulu specifically, there is also the belief that a "horde of spirits" from multiple ethnic groups come together to take over a person's body.

The common cultural treatment for the claimed ailment is for one of the traditional healers, often ukuthwasa themselves, to perform a ritual of exorcism.

== History ==
Recorded incidents of amafufunyana appear to have begun in the early 20th century and researchers such as Ngubane et al have suggested that its cultural formation may have had something to do with colonialism and migration of indigenous peoples away from their homes. There have also been widespread outbreaks of the condition, similar to events involving contagious spread of hysteria, recorded in the 1980s at a rural girls' boarding school.

The most common types of people that are identified by the cultural group are those of the lowest economic and social level and more often during times of cultural hardship and change, such as during migrations. More women than men are also identified.

== See also ==
- Ufufunyane
- Traditional healers of Southern Africa
