= Ukuthwasa =

Culture-bound syndrome

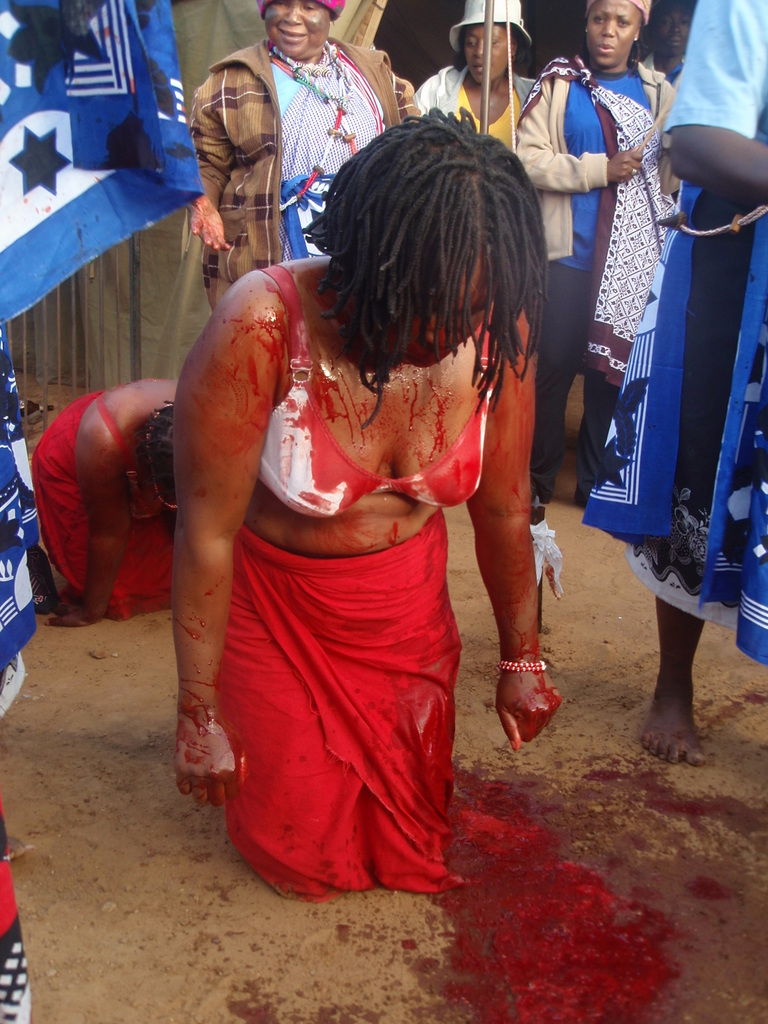
iThwasa after drinking the blood of a goat at a sangoma initiation (Ukuthwasa) ceremony

Ukuthwasa is a Southern African culture-bound syndrome associated with the calling and the initiation process to become a sangoma, a type of traditional healer. In the cultural context of traditional healers in Southern Africa, the journey of ukuthwasa (or intwaso) involves a spiritual process marked by rituals, teachings, and preparations. It begins with a calling, idlozi, from ancestors, often received through dreams or altered states of consciousness. Initiates, known as ithwasane or ithwasa, undergo formal training under a mentor, gobela, which can last months to years. Ukuthwasa process entails physical, psychological, and spiritual manifestations, which are believed to cleanse and prepare the initiate. The term ukuthwasa, meaning "come out" or "be reborn," signifies the transformative nature of the experience. Both men and women can become traditional healers through this calling.

In the community of traditional healers, Ukuthwasa is perceived to hold cultural and spiritual significance, preserving traditions, and bridging the human and spirit worlds. However, the process can lead to intense psychosocial and mental health experiences, with some cases of disorders or fatalities. While ukuthwasa was stigmatised during colonialism and apartheid, it's increasingly respected and being integrated in the health system as outlined by the South African Traditional Health Practitioners Act 35 of 2004. In addition, the initiation process has influenced literature, cinema, and popular culture, reflecting its importance in African societies.

Scientific studies revealed that ukuthwasa is associated with people having varying types of psychosis. The coexistence of traditional practices like ukuthwasa and modern healthcare and education can pose challenges.

== Process (from thwasa to sangoma) ==
In the culture of traditional healers of Southern Africa, the journey of ukuthwasa is a deeply personal and spiritual one, marked by various rituals, teachings, and preparations. It begins when an individual receives a calling, known as idlozi or indiki, from their ancestors, often through dreams, visions, or altered states of consciousness. The symptoms and experiences associated with ukuthwasa are significant aspects of the initiation process, or itwasa. These symptoms can include physical, psychological, and spiritual manifestations. Examples of physical symptoms may include illness, insomnia, loss of appetite, or trance-like states. These symptoms are believed to be a form of spiritual cleansing and preparation for the initiate's role as a healer or diviner, also colloquially known as amagqirha in Xhosa and sangoma in Zulu communities.

Both men and women can become traditional healers but they need to be called. Sangomas believe that failure to respond to the calling will result in further illness until the person concedes and goes to be trained. The word ukuthwasa is derived from thwasa which means "the light of the new moon" or from ku mu thwasisa meaning "to be led to the light".

A trainee sangoma, or ithwasane, trains formally under another sangoma known as gobela, a spiritual teacher, for a period of anywhere between a number of months and many years, with some sources suggesting a minimum duration of nine months to fully explore and develop the abilities and knowledge of an initiate. This journey includes metaphysical transformation, symbolized by wearing specific garments, performing ceremonies, and undergoing a process called ivuma ukhufa, where the initiate's old identity dies to be reborn as a healer. They learn about traditional healing practices, spiritual ceremonies, herbal medicine, and the use of divination tools. The training also involves learning humility to the ancestors, purification through steaming, washing in the blood of sacrificed animals, and the use of muti, medicines with spiritual significance. The ithwasa may not see their families during training and must abstain from sexual contact and often live under harsh and strict conditions.

During the training period the ithwasa will share their ailments in the form of song and dance, a process that is nurtured by the analysis of dreams, anxieties, and with prayer. The story develops into a song which becomes a large part of the graduation-type ceremony that marks the end of the ukuthwasa training. At times in the training, and for the graduation, a ritual sacrifice of an animal is performed, usually chickens and a goat or a cow.

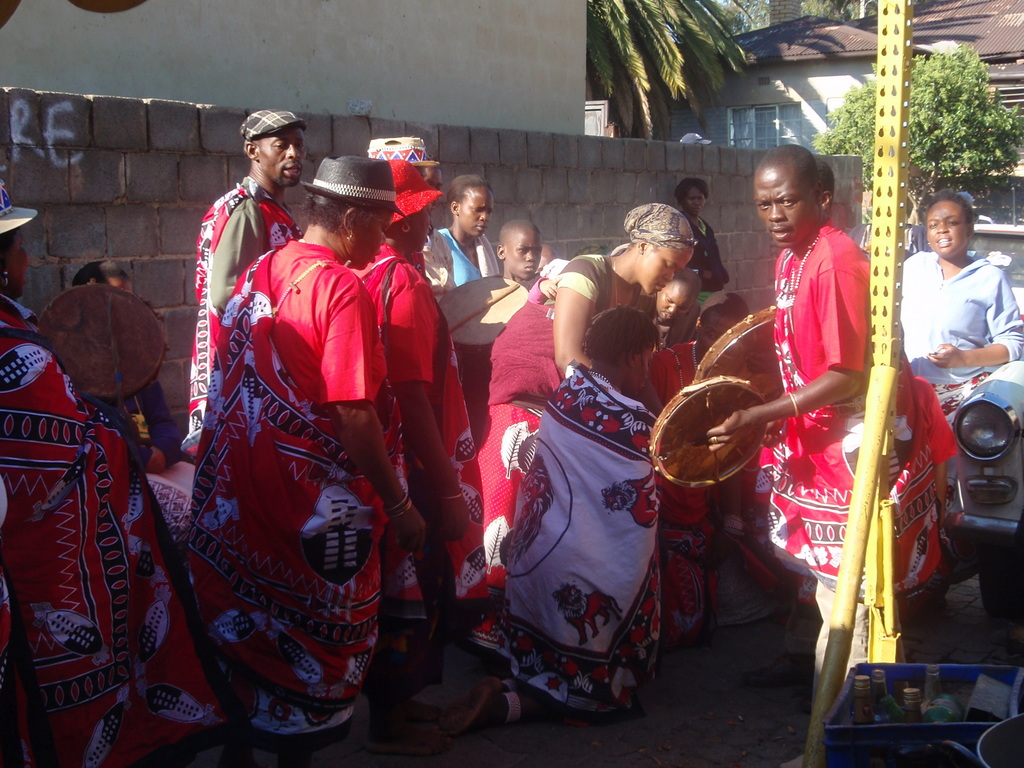
An initiate (ithwasa) being led towards the goat that will be sacrificed at her initiation into becoming a sangoma

At the end of ukuthwasa and during initiation, early hours of the morning a goat that will be slaughtered should be a female one, that's for Umguni, the second one will be slaughtered the following morning after the chickens, which are sacrificed at Abamdzawo river. All these sacrifices are to call to the ancestors and appease them. The local community, friends and family are all invited to the initiation to witness and celebrate the completion of training. The ithwasa is also tested by the local elder sangomas to determine whether they have the skills and insight necessary to heal. This is signified and proved when other sangomas hide the ithwasa's sacred objects, including the gall bladder of the goat (Umgamase) that was sacrificed. The ithwasa must, in front of the community, call upon their ancestors, find the hidden objects, which includes the Umgamase, the ancestors clothes and return them back to the sangomas that hid them. Thus, proving they have the ability to "see" beyond the physical world.

The graduation ceremony takes three days from Friday to Sunday. In the early hours of the morning, the ithwasa sweeps the whole yard, wash their clothes, and to bath at the river and they should return when they are dry.

== Significance ==
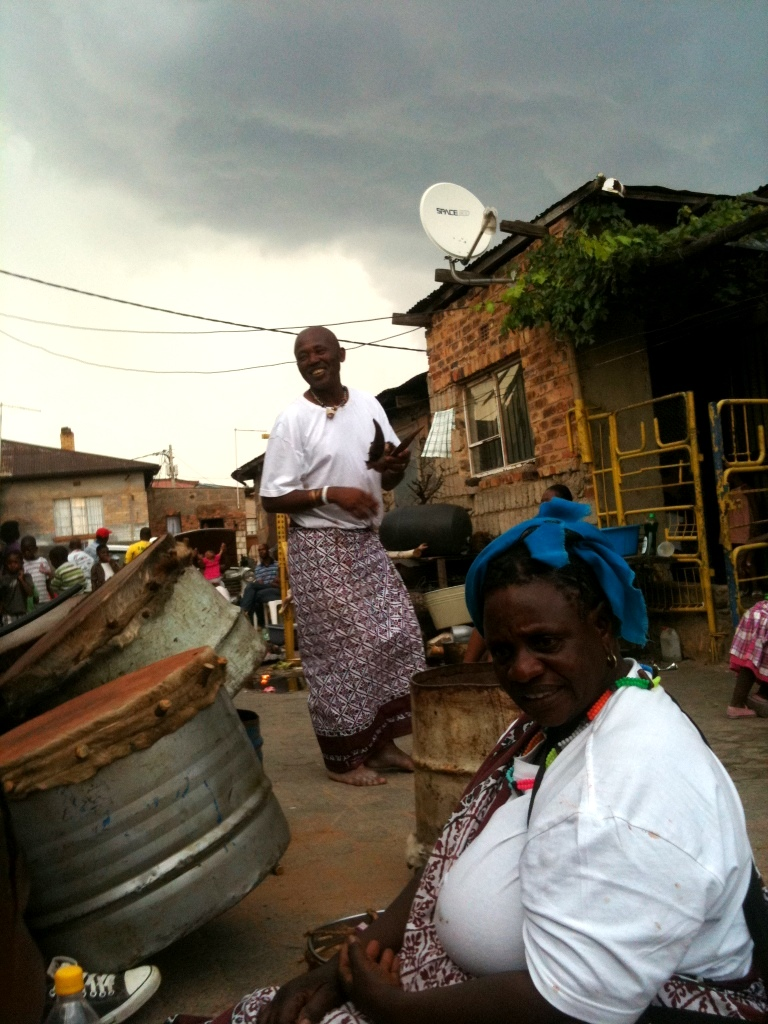
Tsonga traditional healers celebrate at initiation dedicated to the Ndau spirit

Ukuthwasa is a traditional African practice that involves a spiritual calling and initiation process for individuals chosen by their ancestors to become healers or diviners. The Xhosa term "ukuthwasa" translates to "come out" or "be reborn," symbolising the transformative nature of the experience. It holds significant cultural and spiritual importance, particularly among the Xhosa people and Zulu people. The training and thus healing practices and understanding varies across different African communities, including Nguni people, and Xesibe people.

In the culture of traditional healers of Southern Africa, the significance of ukuthwasa extends beyond the individual initiate. Traditional healers and diviners are respected members of their communities and they play crucial roles with providing spiritual guidance, healing, and support. They are often sought after for their ability to address various ailments, both physical and spiritual, and serve as a bridge between the human and spirit worlds. They also play a crucial part in preserving cultural traditions, guiding rituals, and acting as intermediaries between clients and ancestors. Established traditional healers' associations ensure safety and ethical practices within this cultural tradition. There are two main types of Xhosa traditional healers: Igqirha, who offer spiritual insights, and Umthandazeli, who work with ancestral spirits using water, prayers, and indigenous wisdom.

== Criticism ==
Historically, ukuthwasa was frequently regarded as pagan and ungodly by people and bodies outside of the culture. Missionaries, colonizers, and the apartheid regime exerted significant efforts to undermine African divination practices like ukuthwasa. Ukuthwasa was often linked to concepts like sorcery and witchcraft, rather than being associated with healing and spiritual calling answered by some African Christians and Muslims.

=== Mental health ===
Ukuthwasa is a culture-bound syndrome. The symptoms and experiences associated with ukuthwasa are seen as signs of spiritual connection and readiness. After study, it was discovered that this term is directed toward people with varying types of psychosis, schizophrenia, or a psychotic depression. Ukuthwasa initiates may experience intense and sometimes distressing psychosocial and mental health experiences during the process. In some cases, initiates have experienced disorders and even fatalities. A similar term, amafufunyana, refers to claims of demonic possession due to members of the Xhosa people exhibiting aberrant behaviour and psychological concerns. Sometimes, ukuthwasa exhibits signs that resemble symptoms of madness, such as hallucinations and illusions. Due to these characteristics, it's referred to as "inkenqe" (cultural madness) or "umshologu" (spiritual madness).

Zeijst et al. acknowledged that the ancestral calling is commonly associated with mental illness, including atypical sensory experiences. However, their research suggested that for certain individuals, successful completion of ukuthwasa could lead to both recovery from these symptoms and a profession where these experiences are valued. The research suggests that in this particular community, ukuthwasa serves as a culturally accepted healing process that manages experiences that might be termed psychotic by psychiatric standards while convert challenging situations into positive and esteemed occurrences by reducing societal stigma. Nevertheless, if an individual with this condition doesn't successfully transition into a healer, the community may reclassify them as mad (ukuphambana).

Despite debates about cultural influence on mental illness expression, Bakow and Low asserted that significant impact of culture on the experience and treatment of ukuthwasa. Their findings suggested that cultural perspectives deeply affect symptom interpretation, with traditional healing methods proving effective for many participants. The study acknowledged limitations in sample size and the complex nature of ukuthwasa symptoms.

=== Cost ===
Because ukuthwasa is linked to various crises and challenges like accidents, mystical occurrences, deaths, and sometimes legal issues, the Xhosa people also colloquially calls ukuthwasa "inkathazo," signifying trouble. A significant aspect of the issue is the financial burden associated with the process. The ithwasa pays for their trainer, daily expenses, and a cow and goat for graduation.

=== Compatibility with other modern systems ===
==== Schooling ====
Ukuthwasa has been associated with school dropout. Families sometimes compel children to leave school to heed the ancestral calling that ukuthwasa represents. The coexistence of traditional practices like ukuthwasa and formal education systems is complex, often raising questions about their compatibility and effects on individual trajectories.

In January 2019, a grade 10 student in Gauteng was labelled a "demon" by teachers and told to remove her sangoma beads. The student had undergone the ukuthwasa initiation process in 2018. After discussions with the student, parents, and school officials, an agreement was reached that she could wear the beads if concealed under a long-sleeved shirt to avoid drawing attention. However, according to reports, the student was compelled to consume "holy oil" as a mean to remove supposed "evil spirits" from her. Similar incident in 2021 ended with the pupil committing suicide after being called "witch". Siyamthanda Ntlani, who faced similar situation while being a student, stated that

The teachers would say they were afraid of me and didn't know how to teach someone wearing iintsimbi (beads), even though I didn't wear them at school. I also wore an empty goat's gallbladder on my head and I remember being teased by one of my classmates, saying I must remove the condom on my forehead.

— Siyamthanda Ntlani, DispatchLIVE

==== Healthcare ====
In numerous cases, the interaction between traditional and modern healthcare professionals involves coexisting rather than actively collaborating. The government of South Africa acknowledged the presence of traditional healthcare institutions through "The Traditional Health Practitioners Act 35 of 2004," yet this recognition primarily took the form of allowing traditional practitioners to exist alongside physicians within a diverse healthcare framework. Instead of integrating traditional practitioners into the official national healthcare system, the government opts for a pluralistic approach to healthcare.

==== Workplace ====
According to David Bogopa, a researcher at the Nelson Mandela University, the existing leave policies in various organisations do not account for ukuthwasa. In a 2022 study, the majority of the 49 participants noted that their organisations inadequately addressed the well-being requirements of African employees. They indicated that these companies lacked African traditional healing provisions within their Employee Assistance Programs (EAPs).

== In popular culture ==
Ukuthwasa has found its presence in various forms of popular cultural expression including cinema and literature, reflecting its significance in African societies. It has influenced theatre, as seen in works like Richard Loring's African Footprint. Also, elements of ukuthwasa found its way to Niq Mhlongo novel Paradise in Gaza. The first African designer to win the LVMH Prize in 2019, Thebe Magugu in his 2022 collection Alchemy draws inspiration from ukuthwasa, experienced by his friends who transitioned to traditional healers.

In 2018, Buhlebezwe Siwani's exhibition "Qab'imbola" explores the intersection of art and indigenous healing practices in South Africa. Siwani's work reflects on intergenerational trauma in the country's history and the reclamation of African spirituality by black women. The exhibition featured video imagery and live performances. Siwani, who practices ubungoma, indigenous healing, discusses the significance of her artistic journey and initiation into ukuthwasa.

In addition, several celebrities including Dawn Thandeka King, Nandi Nyembe, Letoya Makhene and Boity Thulo have claimed to go through the process with others sparking rumours, like Dineo Ranaka.

== See also ==
- Cultural competence in healthcare
- Depression and culture
- Ufufunyane
