= John Lockley =

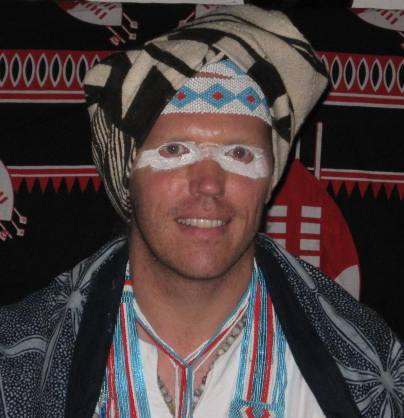
- Born: 1971 (age 54–55); Cape Town, South Africa
- Occupation: Sangoma
- Years active: 2007–present
- Website: www.johnlockley.com

John Keith Kelly Lockley (born 1971) is a white South African who is initiated as an igqirha, a traditional healer or sangoma of the Xhosa people.

== Training as a sangoma ==
Lockley was born in Cape Town in 1971 during apartheid to an Irish mother and a Zimbabwean father with British ancestry.

He completed an honours degree in clinical psychology at Rhodes University in 1997.

In 1997 in post-apartheid South Africa he met Xhosa sangoma Mum Gwevu in the Joza township in Grahamstown, Eastern Cape. Mum Gwevu says she had foreseen his arrival in a dream. He was trained as a sangoma in the Eastern Cape townships, serving a 10-year apprenticeship with Mum Gwevu which he completed in 2007. Mum Gwevu gave him the Xhosa name Ucingolwendaba, which means "messenger".

He also practices and teaches yoga and Zen Buddhism.
