= Vusamazulu Credo Mutwa =

South African traditional healer (1921–2020)

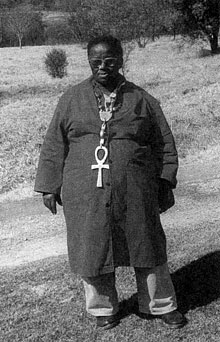
- Credo Mutwa in Soweto, South Africa (1997)
- Born: 21 July 1921; Natal, Union of South Africa
- Died: 25 March 2020 (aged 98); South Africa
- Other name: Credo Mutwa
- Occupation: Author
- Known for: Sangoma, Story-Telling, Sculptor
- Website: http://vusamazulu.com/

Vusamazulu Credo Mutwa /ˈkreɪdoʊ ˈmʊtwə/ (21 July 1921 – 25 March 2020) was a Zulu sangoma (traditional healer) from South Africa. He was known as an author of books that draw upon African mythology, traditional Zulu folklore, extraterrestrial encounters and his own personal encounters. His last work was a graphic novel called the Tree of Life Trilogy based on writings in his best-known book, Indaba my Children. In 2018 he was honoured with an USIBA award presented by the South African Department of Arts and Culture, for his work in indigenous wisdom.

Credo was a sanusi (common spelling isanuse) which is a type of Zulu diviner or sangoma. The term stems from a more historic time and is not widely used today, even in a traditional setting.

Credo lived with his wife Virginia in Kuruman, Northern Cape, where they ran a hospice clinic.

== Early life ==
His father was a widower with three surviving children when he met his mother. His father was a builder and a Christian and his mother was a young Zulu girl. Caught between Catholic missionaries on one hand, and a stubborn old Zulu warrior, Credo Mutwa's maternal grandfather, his parents had no choice but to separate. Credo was born out of wedlock, which caused a great scandal in the village and his mother was thrown out by her father. Later, he was taken in by one of his aunts.

He was subsequently raised by his father's brother and was taken to the South Coast of Natal (present day KwaZulu-Natal), near the northern bank of the Mkomazi River. He did not attend school until he was 14 years old. In 1935, his father found a building job in the old Transvaal province and the whole family relocated to where he was building.

After falling severely ill, he was taken back to KwaZulu-Natal by his uncle. Where modern medicine had failed, his grandfather, a man whom his father despised as a heathen and demon worshipper, helped him back to health. At this point, Credo began to question many of the things about his people the missionaries would have them believe. "Were we Africans really a race of primitives who possessed no knowledge at all before the white man came to Africa?" he asked himself. His grandfather instilled in him the belief that his illness was a sacred calling that he was to become a sangoma, a healer. He underwent thwasa (sangoma training and initiation) with his grandfather and mother's sister, a young sangoma named Mynah.

== Kwa-Khaya Lendaba cultural village ==
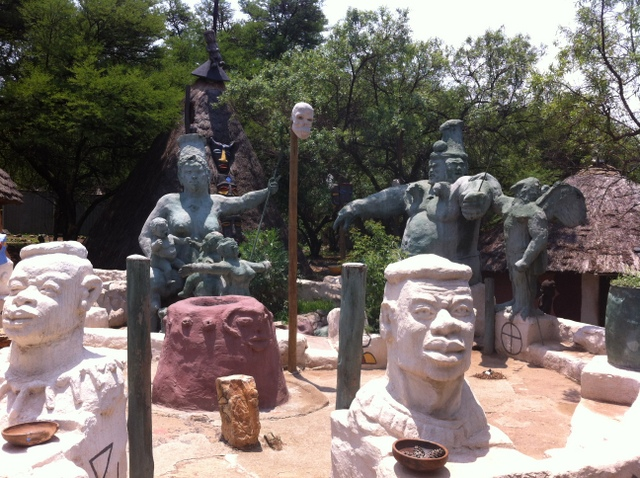
An entrance marked by sculptural portrait of King Ngungunyane on the left and King Shaka on the right.Initiation area of the Kwa-Khaya Lendaba Cultural village in Soweto

In 1974, Credo obtained a piece of land on the Oppenheimer gardens in Soweto in order to create an African cultural village to preserve cultural heritage and his own teachings. He created traditional dwellings imaginatively representing building patterns from across Africa, while human and mythological figures brought to life African folk-lore, beliefs and traditions as seen through his artistic vision. At the time, as the locals were steeped in Christianity, they were suspicious of the cultural village.

Credo believed that the great unrest in Johannesburg and the popularisation of communism in the black struggle drew Africans away from their traditional roots. Unlike most political activists, he actually supported a separation between white and black in order to preserve black traditional tribal customs and way of life. In 1976, students partially burnt down the cultural village after he was misquoted on Afrikaans radio, as they saw the village promoting tribalism and separate development. Parts of the village was burnt again in the mid-1980s during a strike against the West Rand city council.

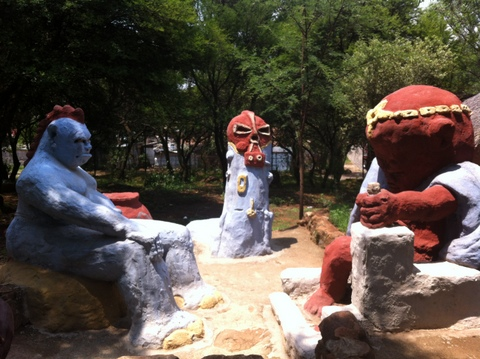
Sculpture of King Khandakhulu discussing his sexually transmitted infection with his gods

Following the murder of his son by black political "activists" and the second burning of his village, Credo moved away from Soweto and developed a cultural tourist village in Lotlamoreng, Mahikeng (known at that time as Bophuthatswana). Here he supervised the building of small cultural villages, each representing the traditional cultures of the main South African tribal peoples.

The Kwa-Khaya Lendaba cultural village in Soweto is currently being restored and is still open to the public free of charge. Tour guides are available from the caretaker of the village.

=== Prophetic sculptures ===
Although many of the sculptures at Kwa-Khaya Lendaba were unfamiliar to the Africans they were meant to represent, a number of them have been said to be prophetic in nature. Most notable were claims of predicting the coming of HIV/AIDS to South Africa. This was seen in his fictional sculptures of King Khandakhulu, who had 200 wives. He couldn't satisfy them all sexually, and so they went out and satisfied themselves elsewhere, which led to them all contracting incurable sexually transmitted infections. The sores on King Khandakhulu's penis resemble the AIDS ribbon. These sculptures were created in 1979, three years before scientists uncovered the human immunodeficiency virus. Claims of his other predictions include the destruction of World Trade Centres in the September 11 attacks, Chris Hani's assassination, and the ousting of president Thabo Mbeki, among others.

== uNosilimela ==
Among Credo Mutwa's prolific writings is a play, uNosilimela. uNosilimela narrates the tale of the Goddess Kimamireva and the daughter of the king of AmaQhashi. The play uses traditional storytelling and performance techniques to examine themes of African origin, culture, and identity. Often referred to as Ubuntu, it has been characterized as a resurgence of African epic storytelling that highlights the virtues and beauty of precolonial civilization. The piece, which highlights Mutwa's distinctive dramaturgy and reliance on precolonial African theatre traditions. A revival of the 1993 African epic, originally staged at Mutwa's Soweto home opened at the Wits Theatre in Johannesburg on 21 May 2019 directed by Kgafela oa Magogodi and Prince Lamla of the University of the Witwatersrand.

== Views on HIV/AIDS ==
Mutwa was an active and vocal advocate in the use of traditional African medicines for the treatment of HIV/AIDS, cancer and tuberculosis. He created a trust called the Vulinda Trust in 1999 to preserve traditional knowledge and to promote the use of these traditional medicines. The primary focus of his research had been on a South African plant called unwele in Zulu (Sutherlandia frutescens). Unwele is traditionally used as a wellbeing tonic, and has also demonstrated anticancer activity through in vitro studies. Research of the efficacy of Sutherlandia frutescens in the treatment of HIV/AIDS is ongoing and phase IIb trials are being conducted at the South African Herbal Science and Medicine Institute (SAHSMI).

== "Reptilian agenda" ==
David Icke aligned himself with Mutwa's theory of a "reptilian agenda" – i.e. that "a reptilian race" evolved on earth and not of alien origin, has controlled the world for thousands of years". He made reference to their earthly origins on video in an Icke interview.

== Support for apartheid ==
Mutwa is recorded as having made statements in support of apartheid. One of his books - My People: The Incredible Writings of a Zulu witch-doctor ISBN 014003210X - contains such statements, primarily referring to practices amongst the Zulu that, in his eyes, justified the implementation of that system.

== Bibliography ==
- Indaba, My Children (1964). ISBN 0-8021-3604-4, 1st American edition (March 1999)
- Zulu Shaman: Dreams, Prophecies, and Mysteries. ISBN 0-89281-129-3, 2nd edition (10 October 2003)
- Songs of the Stars. ISBN 1-886449-01-5, 1st edition (May 2000)
- Africa Is My Witness, Johannesburg: Blue Crane Books, 1966. ISBN unknown
- The Reptilian Agenda with David Icke and Credo Mutwa - the complete series.
- My People, the Writings of a Zulu Witch-Doctor (Penguin Books, 1977) ISBN 0-14-003210-X
- Let Not My Country Die Publisher: United Publishers International (1986) Language: English ISBN 978-0620102902
