= Mercy Manci =

South African activist

- Born: 28 September 1955 (age 71); Hlwahlwazi, Cape Province, Union of South Africa
- Occupations: sangoma and HIV activist

Mercy Manci (born 28 September 1955) is a Xhosa sangoma and HIV activist from South Africa. She has participated and presented at conferences in a.o. Cameroon, Nigeria, and Italy.

== Early life ==
Mercy Manci was born in the small village of Hlwahlwazi, Cape Province, South Africa in 1955. She was the firstborn of a nine children. At birth she was covered with a white substance, which her mother called a "net", which indicated that she was a special child. She was raised by her grandmother, because her mother was a domestic worker in Durban. Her grandmother was a traditional healer and as a child Mercy would help her prepare muti.

When she was teenager, she was "grabbed" by another family to marry one of their sons, in order to avoid lengthy lobola negotiations. As she was no longer a virgin, she could not return to her mother, and the marriage became official when the family paid four cows. She has one daughter from this marriage.

While she lived in the Ciskei, and her husband went to work in the mines, she studied nursing through correspondence at Damelin. However, when her husband came home, he burned her books and destroyed the typewriter she bought. Eventually, after he discovered that she was taking contraceptives behind his back, something that was taboo at that time, their marriage ended and he sent her back to her family. Instead of returning to her family's home, she went to Johannesburg and found a job as a Doctor's assistant.

While she was living in Johannesburg, she fell sick and began to dream strangely. Eventually a traditional healer would confirm that she need to answer a calling to become a sangoma.

== Activism ==
Manci founded Nyangazeziswe, meaning Healers of the Nation, an organisation dealing with African traditional healing and HIV. She focussed on giving workshops for other traditional healers in the Eastern Cape, but also internationally, teaching them how to use condoms and how HIV is transmitted.

In 2000, Mercy Manci appeared in an episode of Siyayinqoba Beat It! a television program about HIV, developed and produced by the Community Media Trust in South Africa.
