= Depression and culture =

Culture defines how people view the world and certain phenomena. Culture also appears to influence the way people experience depression. An individual's experience with depression can vary from country to country. For example, a qualitative study revealed that some countries did not recognize post-natal depression as an illness; rather, it was viewed as a state of unhappiness that did not require any health interventions.

== Causes ==
=== Collectivism ===
In contrast to the individualistic views of the Western culture, which emphasize individual thought, achievement, and well-being, Eastern cultures operate on collectivism, which focuses on the group and the interdependency of its members rather than any one person. The collectivistic view of the self is that it can only be understood through one's social relationships and affiliations. These relationships and affiliations make up a network where the nuclear family shares the closest bonds, followed by the extended family and close friends.

Although the collectivism of Eastern cultures creates a strong support system for the group, it produces many stressors that can lead to depression and anxiety. For example, the overwhelming focus on the group rather than the individual can result in feelings of lost individual identity and sense of self. Identity issues such as these are historically linked with depression. Moreover, many rules and social norms exist in collective cultures than in individual cultures to maintain the harmony of the group. This combined with the cohesiveness of the group can make social mistakes very public and result in feelings of shame and embarrassment by the individual at fault. Research indicates that these feelings are associated with social anxiety within collectivistic societies. A bigger mistake that affects an individual's reputation or results in the loss of honor has more severe consequences because of the stress associated with maintaining that honor.

Symptoms of depression are often expressed differently in collectivistic societies than individualistic ones. Overarching psychological pain and guilt are often a result of depression. Guilt and distress are symptoms of depression; yet they may be experienced differently across cultures. A study by Pewzner-Apeloig and colleagues (1994) found that differences in the way depression was experienced in terms of guilt between African and Western cultures existed. This serves as an example to demonstrate how differences in collectivistic societies in comparison to individualistic societies matter. The expression of symptoms of depression changed in these countries.

The way communities combat depression varies on the basis of whether it is within a collectivistic society or not. It has been shown that a better support system is in place for those who are susceptible to depression in collectivistic societies. On the other hand, in individualized societies, depression is primarily combated through solo work in therapy. Cognitive behavioral therapy (CBT) is used by psychologists to change one's thoughts and behavioral patterns. CBT has been shown to be quite effective. Both ways of approaching and treating depression can be effective. Less emphasis on the individual can help minimize rumination and self loathing which are both linked to or direct symptoms of depression. Yet, more focus on the individuals thought patterns and intervention of negative thoughts and behaviors can be effective.

=== Acculturation ===
The process of acculturation involves adjusting one's values, attitudes, and cultural practices in to order to effectively adapt to a new culture. Acculturation is difficult for most immigrants, but especially so for Eastern immigrants since the Western and Eastern cultures differ greatly. The biggest challenges Eastern immigrants must face when they travel to America are the sudden loss of a support system, child rearing, and limited knowledge about the American way of life. Coming from a collectivist culture that places great emphasis on relationships, immigrants may mourn the loss of their friends and family. The likelihood of suicide and depression tends to increase as acculturation stress, such as this loss, increases. Tensions within the nuclear family may also arise as children assimilate to the mainstream culture and language and identify less with their immigrant parents. Adolescents whose families strictly follow traditional culture are at a high risk for depression and suicide. A lack of knowledge about the American culture can increase the cultural gap between parents and children.

Research shows that the level of distress and the likelihood that one will develop depression is higher in first generation immigrants than subsequent ones. This is likely due to increase psychological stress related to acculturation. A study by Tibubos states: "mean score patterns were similar for all groups, analyses of item loading among first‐generation migrants yielded some variance in patterns pointing out that certain items have a distinct impact on depression for specific groups."

The many stressors an individual or family faces by moving to a different country can explain the growing prevalence of depression. White R.M.B. et al. demonstrated that environmental stressors can disrupt key parenting processes. This disrupter increase the prevalence of depression and aggression. Culture differs across countries; hence, the way things are done varies and parents must learn these differences. These changes become very stressful and can in turn lead to depression in both mothers and fathers. In White's study: "Family models and parenting styles/environmental worries which are often a result of culture could explain increased depression symptoms in parents who live in dangerous neighbors." Adapting to a new culture is stressful and this increase in stress leads to higher prevalence for depression.

=== Gender ===
As is true in Western societies, depression is more prevalent in women than in men in collective cultures. Some have hypothesized that this is due to their inferior positions in the culture, in which they may experience domestic violence, poverty, and inequality that can greatly contribute to depression. Moreover, research conducted in the United States, Chile and Spain found that cultural differences on the expectations of individuals based on gender varied across cultures and that resulted in different levels of depression across individuals Changes in gender roles across countries and cultures in this study served to explain varying levels of stress and responsibility that changed on the basis of gender. These ever changing expectations and these additional responsibilities on the basis of gender increased levels of depression. A study by Ngcobo and Pillay reports a high level of depression in black South African women (83.34%) and a gender difference ratio of four to one. Depression in South Africa is often linked back to low socioeconomic factors and loss through death and abuse. Despite its prevalence, little is understood about depression in South African women. This is a result of the laws of apartheid and the inadequate psychological services that followed, as well as factors such as under-reporting, misdiagnosis, language barriers and cultural differences.

The differences in gender roles within a community also impact one's level of depression. According to Wichstrøm (1999) women tend to ruminate more and therefore symptoms of depression can be accentuated. Since women are encouraged to talk about and share their feelings, they can get caught talking about and staying in a negative state. On the other hand, boys are taught not to discuss their feelings with others which then diminishes or even gets rid of rumination entirely. The way one is socialized to deal with their negative emotions will vary across cultures and may lead to different outcomes.

== Symptoms ==
Considering the stigma associated with mental illnesses in the Arab culture, it is not surprising that many Easterners express depression and anxiety through somatic complaints. This is especially true with Eastern women, who may feel symptoms of depression as a result of inequality, but are taught not to express personal feelings. Instead, they complain of headaches, numbness, breathlessness, and chest pains to receive some form of medical attention. Somatization is also common among individuals with little knowledge of mental health who have no linguistic way to express their symptoms.

In some parts of Chinese society, depression is expressed as and experienced in terms of a physical experience rather than psychological. According to Kleinman (2004): "Many depressed Chinese people do not report feeling sad, but rather express boredom, discomfort, feelings of inner pressure, and symptoms of pain, dizziness". This is different from the way depression is perceived in America in which people often report sadness or feeling down.

Symptoms do not only vary in their expression across cultures but will also greatly vary within cultures and across individuals. Depression is a heterogeneous disorder. Sometimes depression leads to increased appetite, while other times it leads to decreased appetite. Similarly, a symptom of depression can be both an increase in sleep or decrease in sleep. Symptoms will look different from individual to individual; however, as mentioned above, the expression of these symptoms tend to follow somewhat of a trend from one culture to the next.

== Stigma and knowledge of mental illness ==
In many other non-Western societies, a stigma is associated with mental disorders despite high prevalence of depression and anxiety. Many Easterners believe that symptoms of depression and anxiety are simply a part of life and do not require medical attention. Also, individuals from collective societies tend to be extremely careful in maintaining their reputations, and mental distress is usually interpreted as a weak faith in God and/or a weak self. Eastern cultures attribute mental illness to supernatural causes or social behaviors like bad character or unfavorable behavior in a past life. Therefore, they do not seek treatment for their symptoms in order to avoid shame and gossip. This stigma stems in part from the limited knowledge many Easterners have about depression and anxiety. Multiple studies reveal that the majority Easterners do not know the names of mental illnesses. Instead, they describe their symptoms through series of physical complaints.

Rates of clinical depression are greater in the West than in Asia. According to this study, Asian cultures think differently about emotions than do Western cultures. Not only do changes in one's understanding of psychological disorders change the prevalence of mental health problems it also has an impact on the rate at which these symptoms become problematic. An individual's education on mental health will impact their likelihood of seeking help.

== Treatment ==
Research indicates that for psychologists to effectively diagnose and treat patients of an ethnic minority they need to consider cultural differences. Appropriate cultural knowledge may help psychologists appropriately adjust their methods to fit the needs of a diverse population.

== Specific cultures ==
=== Arab ===
The Arab American Institute Foundation estimates that there are over 3.5 million individuals with Arab-speaking ancestry residing in the United States, with thousands more arriving from the Middle East every year. As these numbers increase, so does the importance of psychologists to understand the Arab culture. Arab American immigrants make for an interesting case because they face additional discriminatory stressors associated with the events of the 9/11 attacks and political tensions in the Middle East.

The causes of depression and anxiety in Arabs and Arab Americans are a combination of biological factors and psychological and social factors that are greatly influenced by the Arab culture and immigration. Research indicates that biological markers of depression are consistent between Arab and Western populations, as are many psychological factors.

Arabs who seek psychological help are more confident about the effectiveness of medication over therapy. But since many Arabs either refuse to meet with mental health professionals or do not have any knowledge of them, traditional treatment methods are still commonly used. Islamic therapy, for example, involves Quran recitation by an imam to repel moral deviance from the soul of the individual. The imam may also suggest old Islamic remedies, such as ice baths and herbal antidotes. Using Islam to simply cope with psychological distress is a more widely used method of treatment that is supported by research. A study completed on depressed Pakistani patients also reported that the participants believed that medicine could rid them of their symptoms but had little to no knowledge of psychotherapy.

=== Latino ===
Latino adolescents tend to have higher levels of symptoms of depression than some of their Caucasian and African American peers. An explanation for this difference is the increase in cultural stressors that in turn add to this form of cultural disparity. Although the cultural stressors have not yet been identified, the correlation between it and symptoms of and the prevalence of depression is still significant. Within communities, discrimination on the basis of race and ethnicity is also a strong contributor to the elevated number of depressive symptoms among Latino youth.
