= Traditional healers of Southern Africa =

Practitioners of traditional African medicine in Southern Africa

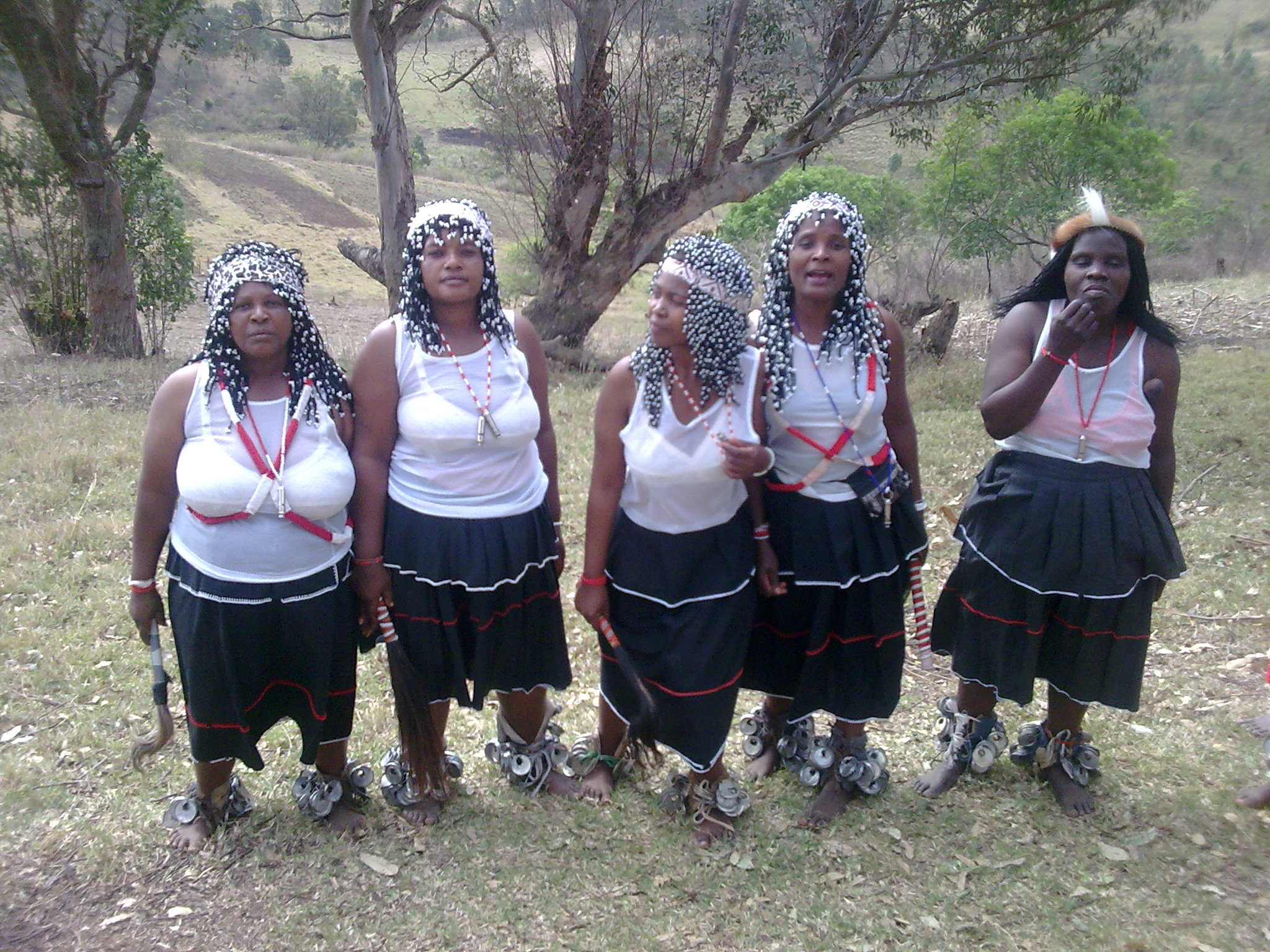
Five sangomas in KwaZulu-Natal

Traditional healers of Southern Africa are practitioners of traditional African medicine in Southern Africa. They fulfil different social and political roles in the community like divination, healing physical, emotional, and spiritual illnesses, directing birth or death rituals, finding lost cattle, protecting warriors, counteracting witchcraft and narrating the history, cosmology, and concepts of their tradition.

There are two main types of traditional healers within the Nguni, Sotho, and Tsonga societies of Southern Africa: the diviner (sangoma) and the herbalist (inyanga). These healers are effectively South African shamans who are highly revered and respected in a society where illness is thought to be caused by witchcraft, pollution (contact with impure objects or occurrences) or through neglect of the ancestors. It is estimated that there are as many as 200,000 traditional healers in South Africa compared to 25,000 doctors trained in bio-medical practice. Traditional healers are consulted by approximately 60% of the South African population, usually in conjunction with modern bio-medical services. For harmony between the living and the dead, vital for a trouble-free life, traditional healers believe that the ancestors must be shown respect through ritual and animal sacrifice. They perform summoning rituals by burning plants like impepho (Helichrysum petiolare), dancing, chanting, channeling or playing drums.

Traditional healers will often give their patients muthi—medications made from plant, animal and minerals—imbued with spiritual significance. These muthi often have powerful symbolism; for example, lion fat might be prepared for children to promote courage. There are medicines for everything from physical and mental illness, social disharmony and spiritual difficulties to potions for protection, love and luck.

Although sangoma is a Zulu term that is colloquially used to describe all types of Southern African traditional healers, there are differences between practices: an inyanga is concerned mainly with medicines made from plants and animals, while a sangoma relies primarily on divination for healing purposes and might also be considered a type of fortune teller. A trainee sangoma (or ithwasane) starts their ukuthwasa or ubungoma (in Xhosa) journey which is associated with the "calling" to become a sangoma, though this event also involves those with schizophrenia. A similar term, amafufunyana refers to claims of demonic possession due to members of the Xhosa people exhibiting aberrant behaviour and psychological concerns. After study, it was discovered that this term is directed toward people with varying types of schizophrenia.

In modern times, colonialism, urbanisation, apartheid and transculturation have blurred the distinction between the two and traditional healers tend to practice both arts. Traditional healers can alternate between these roles by diagnosing common illnesses, selling and dispensing remedies for medical complaints, and divining cause and providing solutions to spiritually or socially centred complaints.

Each culture has their own terminology for their traditional healers. Xhosa traditional healers are known as amaxhwele (herbalists) or amagqirha (diviners). Ngaka and selaoli are the terms in Northern Sotho and Southern Sotho respectively, while among the Venda they are called mungome. The Tsonga refer to their healers as n'anga or mungoma.

== Beliefs and tradition ==
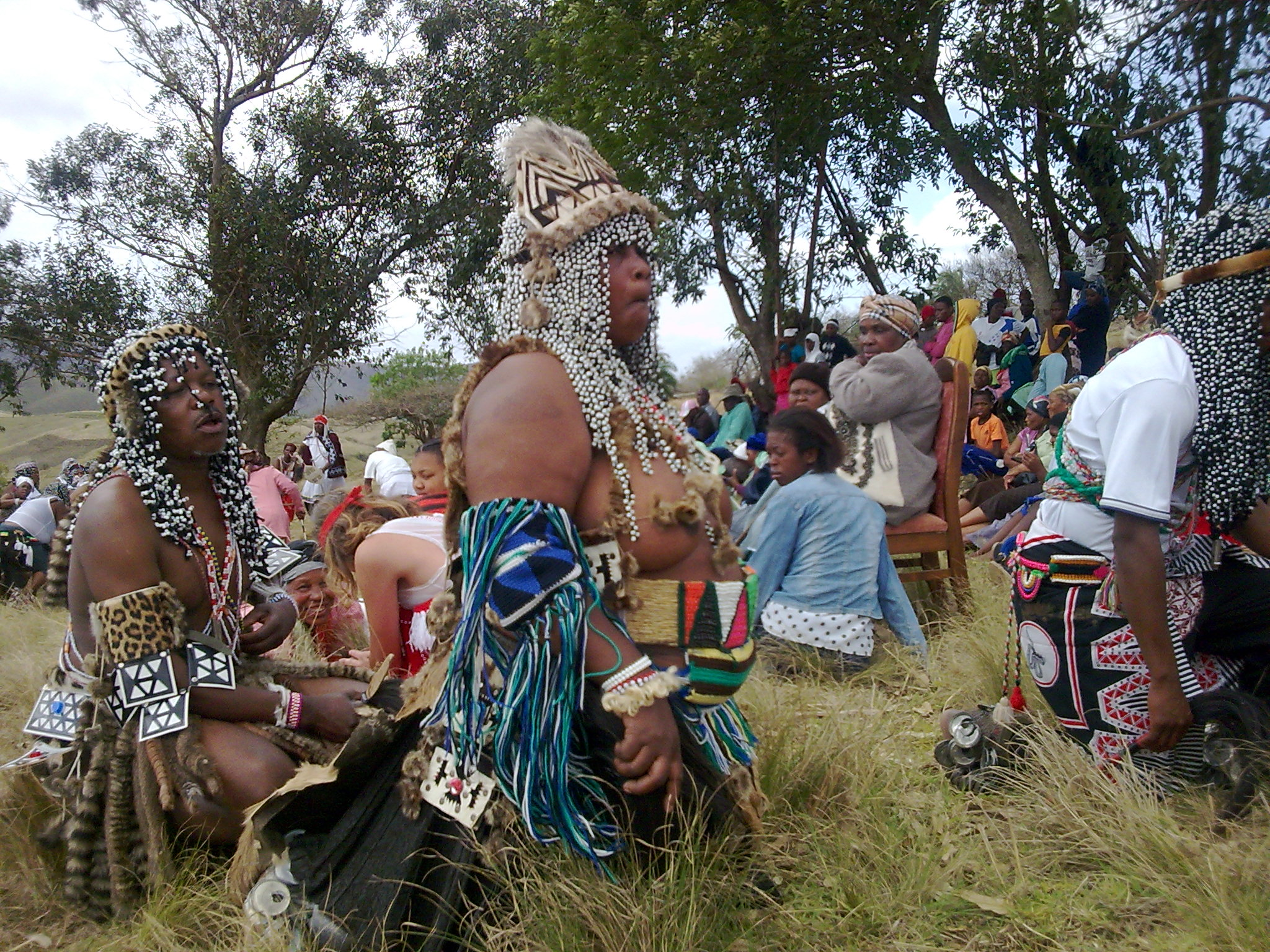
Sangomas greeting each other

A sangoma is a practitioner of Ngoma, a philosophy based on a belief in ancestral spirits (siSwati: amadloti; Zulu: amadlozi; Sesotho: badimo; Xhosa: izinyanya; Tsonga: Swikwembu) and the practice of traditional African medicine, which is often a mix of medicinal plants and various animal body fats or skin. Sangomas perform a holistic and symbolic form of healing by drawing on the embedded beliefs of the Bantu peoples in South Africa, who believe that ancestors in the afterlife guide and protect the living.

Sangomas are called to heal, and through them, it is believed that ancestors from the spirit world can give instruction and advice to heal illness, social disharmony and spiritual difficulties. Traditional healers work in a sacred healing hut or indumba, where they believe their ancestors reside. Where no physical 'indumba' is available, a makeshift miniature sacred place called imsamo can be used.

Sangomas believe they are able to access advice and guidance from their ancestors for their patients through spirit possession by an ancestor, or mediumship, divination bones, or by dream interpretation. In possession states, the sangoma works themself into a trance through drumming, dancing and chanting, and allows their ego to step aside for an ancestor to take possession of their body and communicate directly with the patient, or dancing fervently beyond their stated ability.

The sangoma will provide specific information about the problems of the patient. Some sangomas speak to their patients through regular conversation, whilst others speak in tongues or languages foreign to their patients, but all languages used by sangomas are indigenous Southern African languages depending on the specific ancestors being called upon. Not all sangomas follow the same rituals or beliefs.

Ancestral spirits can be the personal ancestors of the sangoma or the patient, or they might be general ancestors associated with the geographic area or the community. It is believed that the spirits have the power to intervene in people's lives who work to connect the sangoma to the spirits that are acting in a manner to cause affliction. For example, a crab could be invoked as a mediator between the human world and the world of spirits because of its ability to move between the world of the land and the sea. Helping and harming spirits are believed to use the human body as a battleground for their own conflicts. By using ngoma, the sangoma believes they can create harmony between the spirits, which is thought to bring an alleviation of the patient's suffering.

The sangoma may burn incense (like impepho) or sacrifice animals to please the ancestral spirits. Snuff is also used to communicate with the ancestors through prayer.

== Divination, diagnosis and healing practices ==
A sangoma's goal in healing is to establish a balanced and harmless relationship between the afflicted patient and the spirits that are causing their illness or problem. The healer intercedes between the patient and the world of the dead in order to make restitution. This is generally performed through divination (throwing the bones or ancestral channelling), purification rituals, or animal sacrifice to appease the spirits through the atonement.Throwing bones to access the advice of ancestors is an alternative practice to the relatively exhausting ritual of possession by the ancestor.

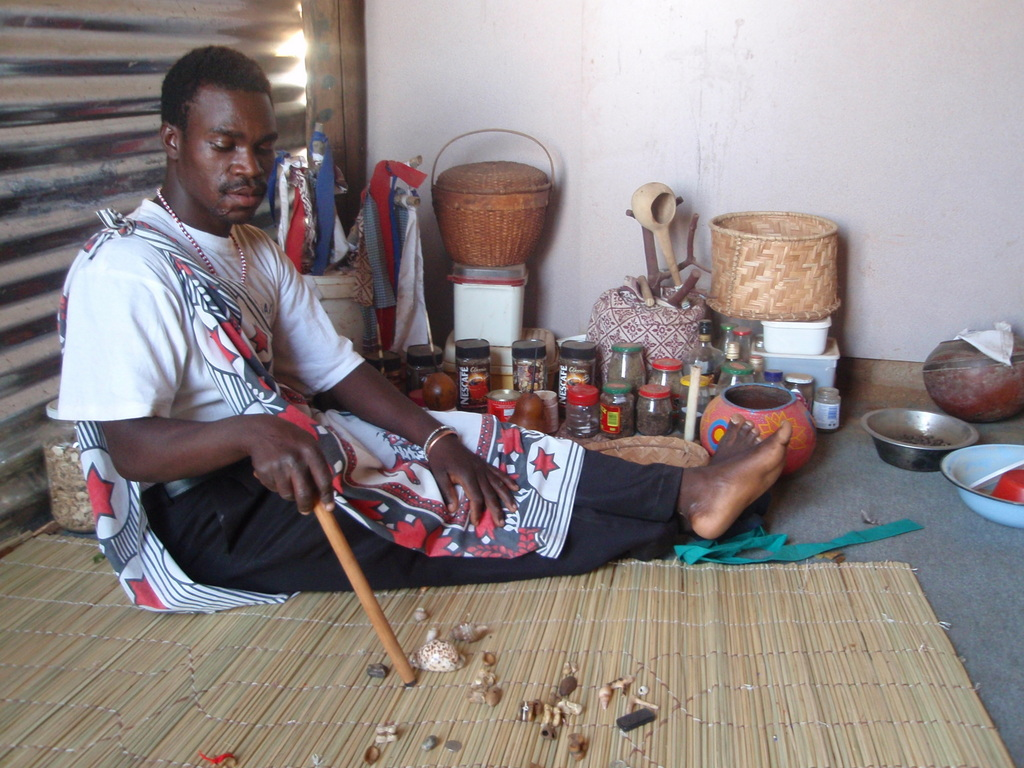
Sangoma performing a divination by reading bones after they are thrown

In a typical session, a patient will visit the sangoma, and the sangoma must determine what the affliction is or the reason the patient has come to them for help. Before the throwing of the bones, the healer should first ask for the name and surname of the patient; the healer then calls the ancestors by names, starting with their initiators' names, then their own, followed by the patient's ancestor's names. The patient or diviner throws bones on the floor, which may include animal vertebrae, dominoes, dice, coins, shells and stones, each with a specific significance to human life. For example, a hyena bone signifies a thief and will provide information about stolen objects. The sangoma or patient may physically throw the bones, but the ancestors control how they land. The sangoma then interprets this metaphor in relation to the patient's afflictions, what the ancestors of the patient require, and how to resolve the disharmony. In the same way, sangomas will interpret metaphors present in dreams, either their own those of their patients.

When the diviner comes to an acceptable understanding of the problem and the patient agrees, the diviner then throws the bones again to ask the ancestors if they could help the patient. Depending on the feedback from the bones, they will instruct the patient on a course of medicine, which may include the use of ngoma, referral to a herbalist if the sangoma does not have the knowledge themselves, or the recommendation of a Western-style medicine regimen.

== Medicines and muthi ==
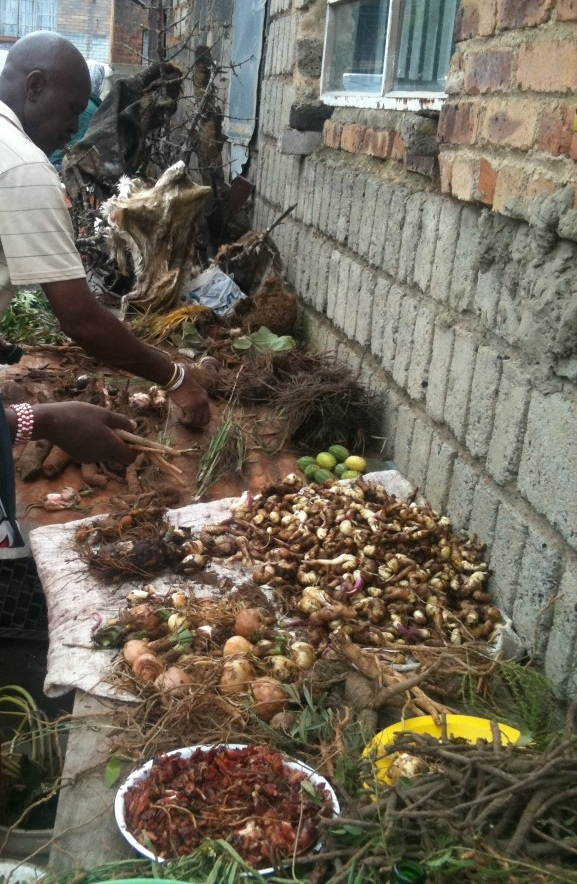
Preparing and drying out freshly picked muthi

The spiritually curative medicines prescribed by a traditional healer are called muthi. They may be employed in healing as warranted in the opinion of the herbal specialist or inyanga. The term "muthi" is derived from the Zulu/Xhosa/Northern Ndebele umuthi, meaning 'tree'.

African traditional medicine makes extensive use of botanical products but the medicine prescribed by an inyanga may also include other formulations which are zoological or mineral in composition. Traditional medicine uses approximately 3,000 out of 30,000 species of higher plants of southern Africa. Over 300 species of plants have been identified as having psychoactive healing effects on the nervous system, many of which need further cultural and scientific study In South African English and Afrikaans, the word muthi is sometimes used as a slang term for medicine in general. A variation on spelling, "muti" is a result of the historical effects of the British colonial spelling.

Bapedi traditional healers use 36 plant species to manage reproductive health problems. These medicinal species are distributed among 35 genera and 20 families. The largest proportion of medicinal species collected belongs to the family Asteraceae (such as Calendula) followed by Fabaceae (such as the butterfly pea plant), and Euphorbiaceae (such as Phyllanthus Muellerianus).

Muthi is prepared, and depending on the affliction, a number of purification practices can be administered. Abstinence and fasting are important things to do in preparing muthi and healing. Purification practices include bathing, vomiting, steaming, nasal ingestion, enemas, and cuttings:

1. Bathing – Herbal mixtures are added to bath water to purify the patient.
2. Vomiting (phalaza) – A large volume (up to +-2 litres) of a weak, lukewarm herbal infusion is drunk and a process of self-induced vomiting occurs to cleanse and tone the system.
3. Steaming (futha) – Medicinal herbs are commonly inhaled by steaming them in a bucket of boiling water. A blanket or preferably a plastic sheet (as blankets absorb heat and don't circulate the steam well) is used to cover the patient and container. Hot rocks or a portable stove may be included to keep the bucket boiling. The patient sits under the blanket, breathes in the herbal steam and sweats.
4. Nasally – A variety of plants can be taken dried and powdered as snuff. Some are taken to induce sneezing which may traditionally be believed to aid the expulsion of disease. Others are taken for the common conditions such as headaches.
5. Enemas – Infusions and some decoctions are commonly administered as enemas. The enema is a preferred route of administration of certain plant extracts, as it is believed they are more effective this way.
6. Cuttings (ukugcaba) – Extracts or powders are directly applied to small cuts made with a razor blade in the patient's skin.

An experienced inyanga/sangoma will generally seek the guidance of an ancestral spirit before embarking to find and collect muthi. Healers pay attention to dreams and prayers for ancestral advice on auspicious time to collect plants, which particular plants to collect and where these plants are located. Many traditional healers won't have to collect plants for each patient as they have herbs stored in their huts. The healer supplements the perceived advice from an ancestral spirit with their own knowledge, training and experience.

== Sangoma calling and training ==
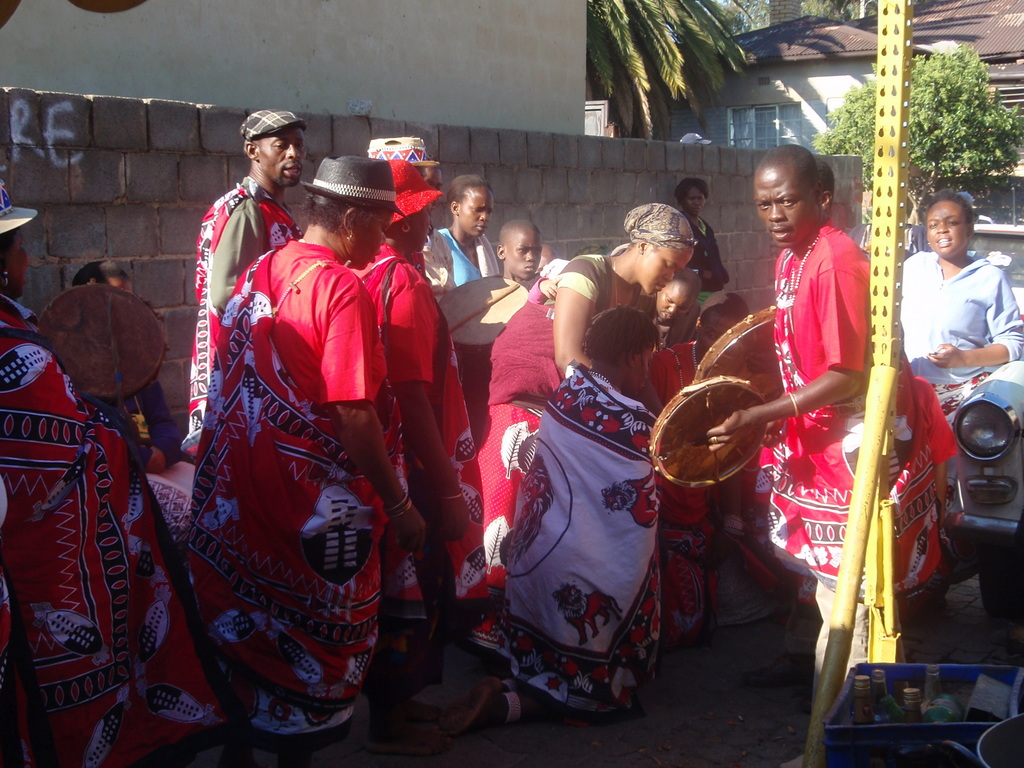
An initiate (ithwasa) being led towards the goat that will be sacrificed at her initiation into becoming a sangoma

Both men and women can become traditional healers. A sangoma is believed to be "called" to heal through an initiation illness; symptoms involve psychosis, headaches, intractable stomach pain, shoulder, neck complaints, short breath, swollen feet and waist issues or illness that cannot be cured by conventional methods. These problems together must be seen by a sangoma as thwasa or the calling of the ancestors, though this event also involves those with schizophrenia. Sangomas believe that failure to respond to the calling will result in further illness until the person concedes and goes to be trained. The word thwasa means 'the light of the new moon' or is derived from ku mu thwasisa meaning 'to be led to the light'.

A trainee sangoma (or ithwasane) trains formally under another sangoma for a period of anywhere between a number of months and many years. The training involves learning humility to the ancestors, purification through steaming, washing in the blood of sacrificed animals, and the use of muthi, medicines with spiritual significance. The trainee may not see their families during training and must abstain from sexual contact and often live under harsh and strict conditions. This is part of the cleansing process to prepare the healer for a life's work of dedication to healing and the intense experiences of training tend to earn a deeply entrenched place in the sangoma's memory.

The training period or ukuthwasa is a deeply personal and spiritual one, marked by various rituals, teachings, and preparations. The process can vary in length, with some sources suggesting a minimum duration of nine months to fully explore and develop the abilities and knowledge of an initiate. The Xhosa term "ukuthwasa" translates to "come out" or "be reborn," symbolising the transformative nature of the experience. A similar term, Amafufunyana refers to claims of demonic possession due to members of the Xhosa people exhibiting aberrant behaviour and psychological concerns. After study, it was discovered that this term is directed toward people with varying types of schizophrenia.

During the training period the healer in training will share their ailments in the form of song and dance, a process that is nurtured by the analysis of dreams, anxieties, and with prayer. The story develops into a song that becomes a large part of the graduation-type ceremony that marks the end of the ukuthwasa training.

At times in the training, and for the graduation, a ritual sacrifice of an animal is required to be performed (usually chickens and a goat or cow). At the end of the training, to signify the start of initiation, a female goat is slaughtered during the early hours of the morning and the next day chickens will be sacrificed next to a river before a second large animal is slaughtered. All these sacrifices are to call to the ancestors and appease them.

The local community, friends and family are all invited to the initiation to witness and celebrate the completion of training. The trainee is tested by the local elder sangomas to determine whether they have the skills and insight necessary to heal. The climactic initiation test is to ensure the trainee has the ability to "see" things hidden from view. This is proved when other sangomas hide sacred objects for the trainee to find in front of the community. The trainee must call upon their ancestors, find the hidden objects, which include the skin of the sacrificed goat and the ancestors' clothes, and return them back to the sangomas that hid them, thus proving they have the ability to 'see' beyond the physical world. The practise is done at night and involves removing the traditional clothing worn throughout the day to be hidden again for the trainee to find. The graduation ceremony takes three days from Friday to Sunday. During the early hours of the morning the trainee is required to sweep the yard, wash their clothing and bath in the river, only returning home when they are dry.

== Drumming and ancestral dancing ==
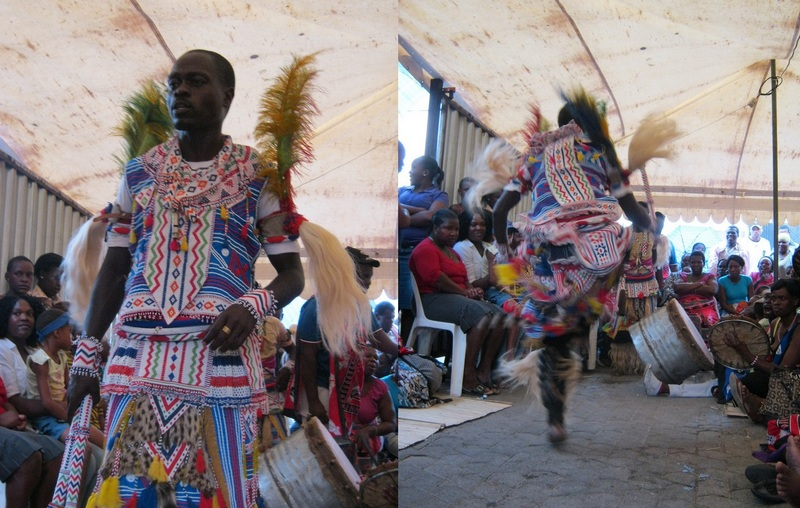
A sangoma in traditional attire dancing in celebration of his ancestors

Sangoma can also literally mean 'person of the drum' or 'the drumming one' and drumming is an important part of summoning the ancestors. During times of celebration (e.g. at an initiation) the possessed sangoma is called to dance and celebrate their ancestors. The sangoma will fall into trance (when in trance a sangoma is not conscious of what is happening, and will require witnesses to repeat what had been said during the trance) where the ancestors will be channeled (which is signified in Zulu traditions by episodes of convulsive fits) followed by the singing of ancestral songs. These songs are echoed back to the ancestor via the audience in a process of call and response. The possessed sangoma will then change into their traditional ancestral clothing and dance vigorously while others drum and sing in celebration.

== History and background ==
The Zulu word with prefix is isangoma (pl. izangoma), alternatively it is also spelled as umngoma (pl. abangoma), sa ngoma means 'do ngoma and i sa ngoma means "those who do ngoma", so sangoma or isangoma refers specifically to the practitioner of the ngoma practice.

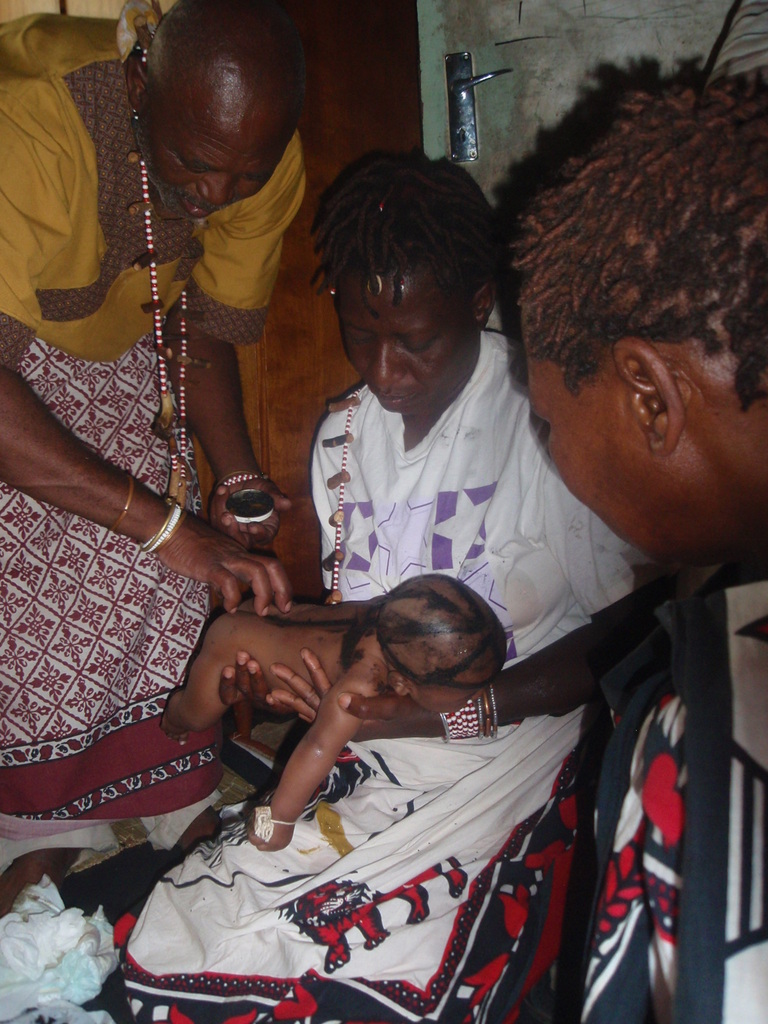
Sangoma/n'anga in Johannesburg, South Africa, performing a traditional baptism to protect the spirit of the baby.

The term sangoma is often used colloquially in South Africa for equivalent professions in other Bantu cultures in Southern Africa. Forms of the ngoma ritual are practiced throughout southern and south-eastern Africa in countries such as South Africa, Eswatini, Zimbabwe, Mozambique, Lesotho, Kenya, and Botswana. In more northern areas the practices are generally more diverse and less organised than the southern practices. Among the Kongo, the practice is called loka or more negatively doga, a term meaning witchcraft.

Ngoma is believed to have come to southern Africa during the western Bantu migration that began around 2000 BCE and was further influenced by the eastern Bantu migration that occurred until 500 CE. The practice has evolved along with the social problems of its users. In pre-colonial form ngoma songs dealt mainly with issues of hunting. Over time the system adapted to include the introduction of guns, and later the racial and class struggles of practitioners under colonial rule.

In Zimbabwe, the civil war experience led to a revival of ngoma practice with a new emphasis on the spirits of the victims of war. The service allowed the sangoma to help people cope with their own violent acts as well as those they had fallen victim to. An example of this is the Tsonga who believe that one of the main alien spirits that can bestow powers of clairvoyance and the ability to detect witchcraft is the Ndau Spirit. The Ndau spirit possesses the descendants of the Gaza soldiers who had slain the Ndau and taken their wives. Once the Ndau spirit has been converted from hostile to benevolent forces, the spirits bestow the powers of divination and healing on the n'angna.

Ngoma has been adapted by many to include both Christian and Muslim beliefs.

== Legal status ==
Sangomas are legally recognised in South Africa as "traditional health practitioners", under the Traditional Health Practitioners Act of 2007 (Act. 22 of 2007) as diviners alongside herbalists, traditional birth attendants, and traditional surgeons. The act calls for the establishment of a national council of traditional health practitioners to regulate and register a.o. sangomas in the country. However, it was only in December 2011 that the National Department of Health took action and opened nominations for seats on an interim council. In October 2012, Health Department spokesperson Joe Maila advised that the department aimed to have the council up and running by the end of 2012. The Interim Traditional Health Practitioners Council was eventually inaugurated on 12 February 2013. Several sections of the act, dealing with the establishment and governance of the national council and the registration of practitioners, came into effect on 1 May 2014.

Previously, the South African Parliament had passed the Traditional Health Practitioners Act of 2004 (Act. 35 of 2004). However, the act was ruled unconstitutional after Doctors for Life International challenged it at the Constitutional Court, citing the insufficient public participation at provincial level in the drafting of the act.

The South African Law Reform Commission received a submission from the Traditional Healers Organisation requesting the investigation of the constitutionality of the Witchcraft Suppression Act of 1957 and the Mpumalanga Witchcraft Suppression Bill of 2007, the drafting of which was suspended in 2008. On 23 March 2010 the Minister of Justice and Constitutional Development approved a South African Law Reform Commission project to review witchcraft legislation. In March 2012 the South African Law Reform Commission advised that Ms Jennifer Joni has been designated as researcher and Judge Dennis Davis has been designated as project leader for Project 135: Review of witchcraft legislation. Dr Theodore Petrus, who completed a doctoral thesis on witchcraft-related crime in 2009, was invited to become part of an advisory committee to assist in the review.

== White sangomas ==
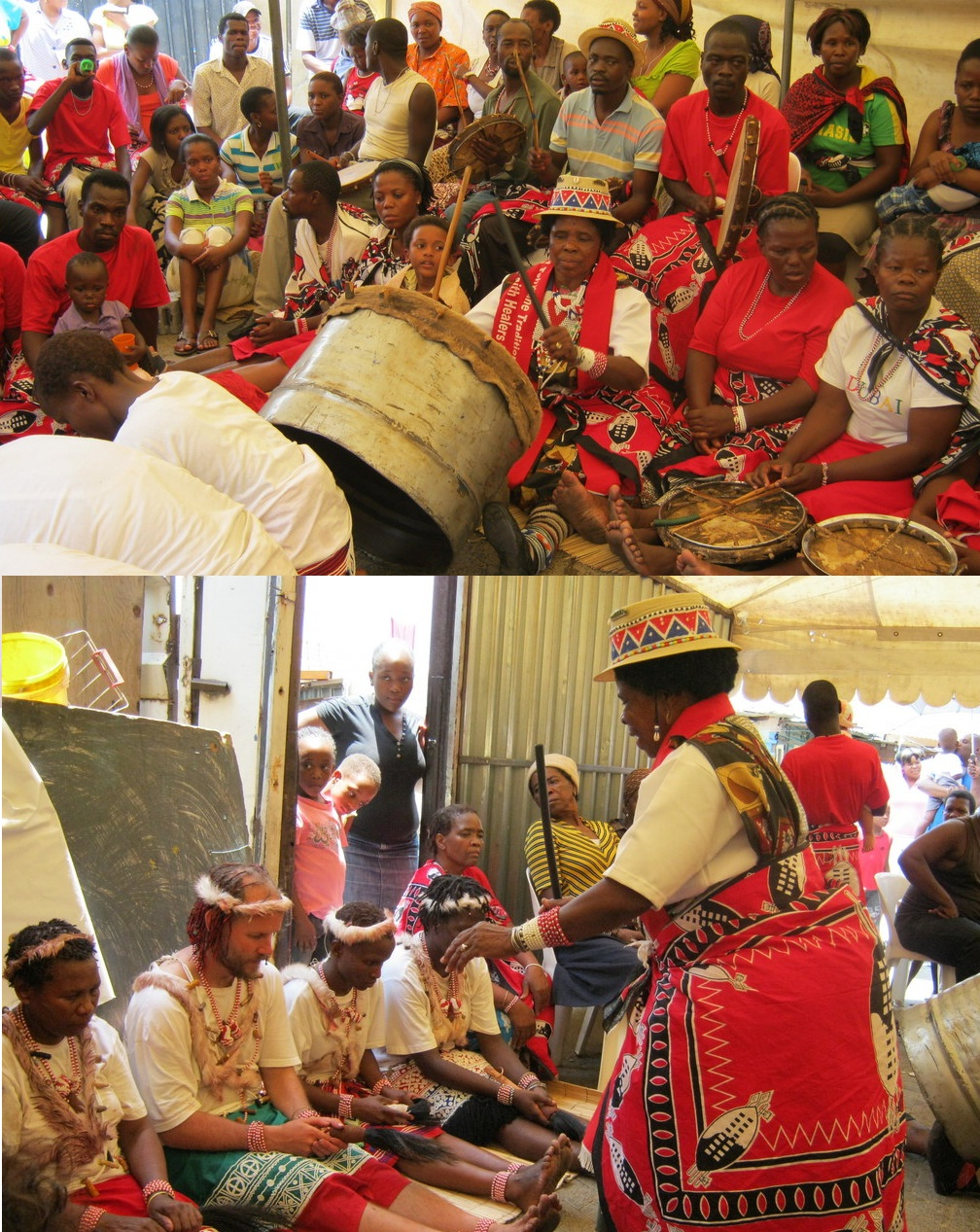
After a successful initiation in Alexandra Township, Johannesburg, Gogo Mashele of the Tshwane Traditional and Faith Healers Forum welcomes new sangomas (including a white thwasa)

While there are recorded instances of white sangomas before 1994, since 1994 an increasing number of white people have openly trained as sangomas in South Africa. The question of authenticity is still an ongoing discussion. According to Nokuzola Mndende of the Icamagu Institute, a Xhosa sangoma and former lecturer in religious studies at the University of Cape Town:

An igqirha is someone who has been called by their ancestors to heal, whether from the maternal or paternal side, they can't be called by [somebody else's] ancestors.

Philip Kubekeli, director of the Traditional Medical Practitioners, Herbalist and Spiritual Healers Association, and Phephsile Maseko, spokesperson of the Traditional Healers Organisation, see nothing wrong with white sangomas. Kubekeli and Maseko maintain the position that traditional healing knows no colour.

Several white sangomas, interviewed by The Big Issue in 2010, claimed that they have been welcomed by the black community in South Africa, aside from isolated experiences of hostility. On the other hand, there have also been reports that white sangomas have been less readily accepted by black sangomas.

A number of South African traditions (e.g. Swazi and Tsonga/Shangaan) involve the belief that a foreign or alien spirit can call one to become a traditional healer, which they call abandzawo, especially if there is a significant extreme relationship between one of the healer's biological ancestors and the foreign spirit that occurred in the past. Dr Nhlavana Maseko, founder of the Traditional Healers Organisation, explains:

Foreign spirits are not of your family. That is all it means. Foreign spirits are not your ancestors. My forefathers, for instance, were warriors and they killed some people. When these people were killed, they become my family's foreign spirits. There must be a working relationship with your foreign spirit and your ancestors. They have something, an injustice, a murder that must be worked out, must be healed. During training, as the ancestors come out, you have to finish up with your own ancestors first. That relationship sorts itself out, then you are ready to work with the foreign spirits. It happens in a natural way. The ancestors do the work through you. Maybe the foreign spirit want to be the important or senior ancestor; when the ancestor of your clan comes, well, they may have to fight it out. You might feel some aches during this time. It is friction among them that is working itself out.

== Relationship with bio-medical medicine ==
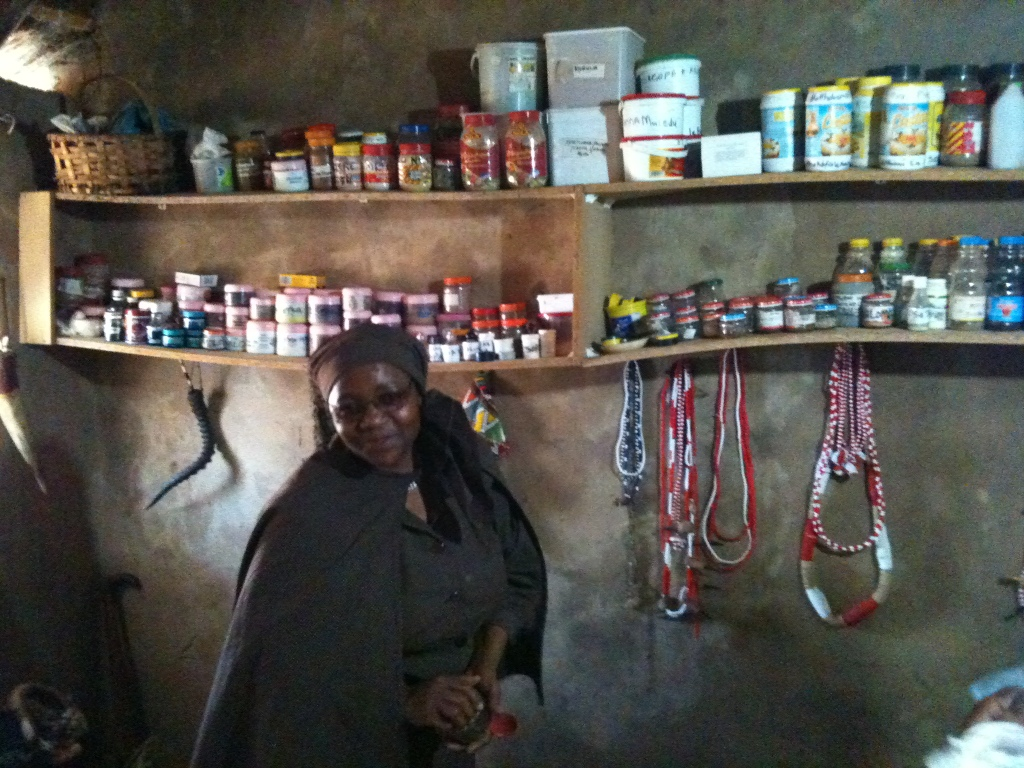
Inyanga in her ndumba, a sacred hut used for healing. Behind her are her mutis, medicine stored in containers.

The formal health sector has shown continued interest in the role of sangomas and the efficacy of their herbal remedies. Botanists and pharmaceutical scientists continue to study the ingredients of traditional medicines in use by sangomas. Well-known contributions to world medicine from South African herbal remedies include aloe, buchu and devil's claw. Public health specialists are now enlisting sangomas in the fight, not only against the spread of HIV/AIDS, but also diarrhoea and pneumonia, which are major causes of death in rural areas, especially in children.

In the past decade, the role of traditional healers has become important in fighting the impact of HIV and treating people infected with the virus before they advance to a point where they require (or can obtain) anti-retroviral drugs. However, there are no traditional medicines in South Africa that have clinically been proven to be effective in the treatment of HIV/AIDS. Repeated use of the same razor blade to make incisions for muthi as well as wielding power over patients to sexually assault them, sometimes dressed up as ritual, carries HIV transmission risks. A conclusion from a review by UNAIDS in September 2000, regarding collaboration with traditional healers in HIV/AIDS prevention and care, found that modern and traditional belief systems are not incompatible, but complementary.

Medical doctors have reported cases of patients with serious gastrointestinal problems through the use of muti, especially in enema form, and have coined the phrase "ritual enema induced colitis" to describe the phenomenon.

== Fraudulent sangomas and scam artists ==
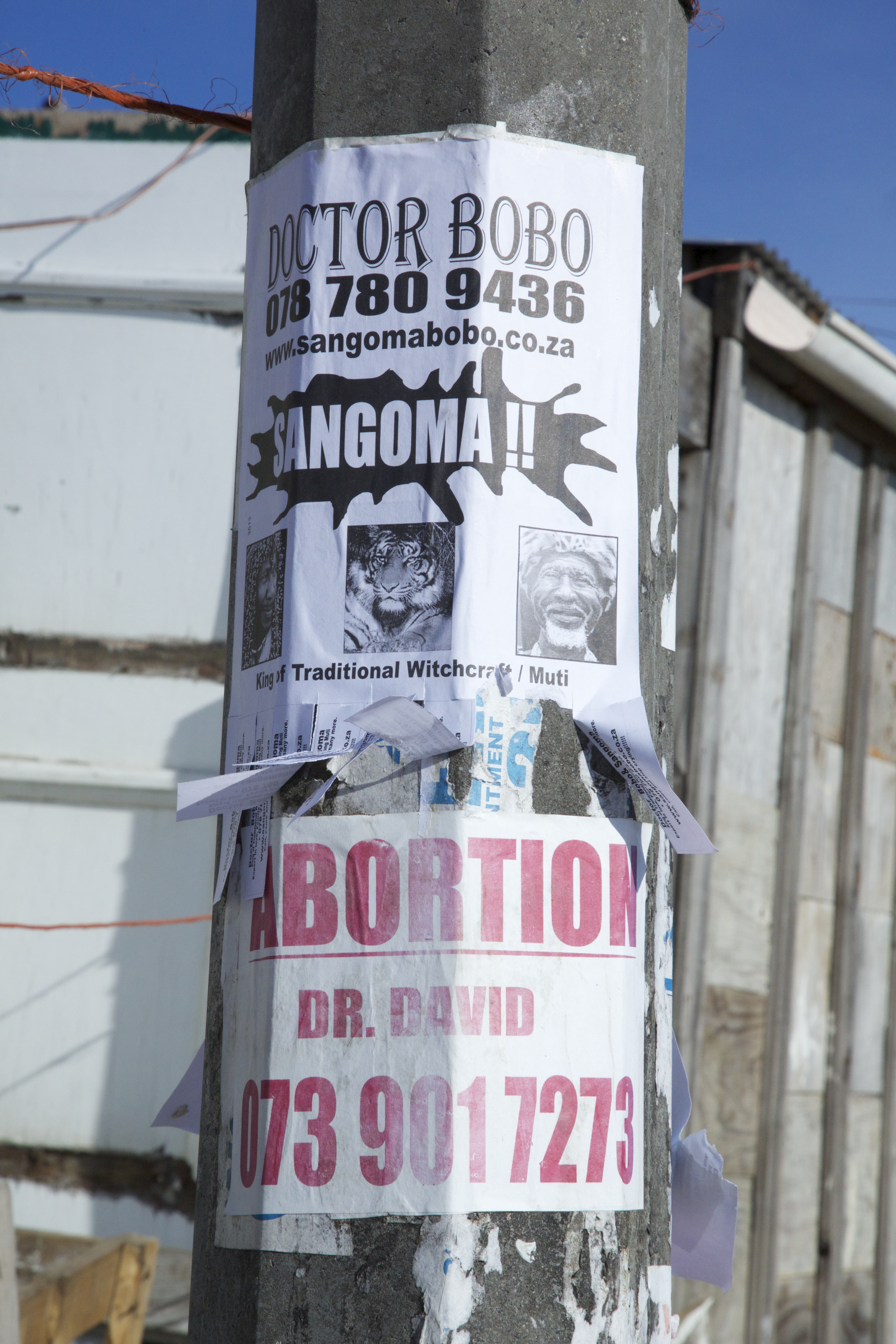
Typical flyer advertising found around the major cities of South Africa

While many traditional healers positively contribute toward the healing process, the industry has been exploited for financial gain by charlatans who have not undergone training, sometimes called plastic shamans. Not all countries in southern Africa have effective regulatory bodies to prevent this practice.

Scammers commonly advertise through flyers and posters plastered on lampposts in streets throughout South Africa, especially in densely populated urban areas. The advertisements claim the ability to bring back lost lovers, potions to enlarge penises and spells that will make people rich or provide them with luck. In the Cape province of South Africa, scammers may adopt Arabic-sounding names in order to attract the local Cape Coloured population, who are in part Muslim.

Significant amounts of money have been lost in these scams and women seeking abortions through these unregulated services have suffered damage to their reproductive organs, impacting their ability to conceive in the future.

Believing that fake healers harm the reputation of traditional healers, trained sangomas are looking to curb their negative impact through regulation, legal action and awareness. Many sangomas do not advertise through flyers or posters, tending to rely on word of mouth and the belief that their ancestors will send them the right clients.

Mary Bungeni, a sangoma herself, explains:

Sangomas don’t do miracles and there is no such a thing as doubling a person’s money. They only help to connect with the ancestors, who gives them directions on how to heal and assist people in need. The ancestors get angry when people play with their name and end up taking away the powers and calling given to a person. The [real] sangomas are not rich because they are controlled by the ancestors. The bogus sangomas cause people to not believe [in the] ancestors, because they lie about their work with the ancestors.

Dr Motlalepula Matsabisa, director of the Medical Research Council's Indigenous Knowledge Unit, says there appears to be many fake traditional healers around, however because of a lack of regulation, they go unchecked and explains that if anyone can bring about good luck and predict lotto numbers, they would not be poor themselves. However, he also warns that people should not be gullible.

Phephsile Maseko, national coordinator of the Traditional Healers Organization (THO), says:

A true healer is someone who has been through initiation, inducted by an expert in the field, who has undergone rigorous training and completed external healing courses. If a patient complains of headaches, they will be given plants with painkilling properties. But the healer will also try to establish the root cause of the headaches, and treat that too. This may mean the healer will provide counselling to the patient. Treatment is usually holistic, and a once-off ointment will generally not do the trick. Many clients come for help with their relationships or marriages. A potion may be given to open the communication channels between couples, so that they can speak about their problems. Counselling will also be on offer, but there is no quick-fix solution.

== Notable healers ==
- Vusamazulu Credo Mutwa (1921–2020) – A Zulu traditional healer (Sanusi), author, and spiritualist known for his extensive knowledge of African mythology and folklore
- Matshobana KaMangete (c. late 18th century – c. 1820s) – A Nguni traditional leader and healer, known as the father of Mzilikazi, the founder of the Ndebele nation
- Busi Mhlongo (1947–2010) – A South African singer, composer, and cultural advocate deeply connected to traditional healing and spiritual themes in her music
- Mercy Manci (born 1955) – A South African traditional healer known for her advocacy in integrating indigenous healing with modern health practices

== See also ==
- Ufufunyane
- San healing practices
- Busi Mhlongo
- John Lockley
- Mercy Manci
- Curandero
- Murder for body parts
- Vusamazulu Credo Mutwa
