= Ufufunyane =

Culture-bound syndrome

Ufufunyane (also ufufuyane) is a culture-bound syndrome, also described in the culture as a curse and a demonic possession. It is seen in Zulu- and Xhosa-speaking communities in southern Africa. In Kenya, it is referred to as saka. It is an anxiety state attributed to the effects of magical potions (given to them by rejected lovers), or spirit or demonic possession. It is common in Zulu people.

== Signs and symptoms ==
Signs and symptoms of Ufufunyane include shouting, sobbing, pseudolalia, paralysis, trance-like states, loss of consciousness, temporary blindness and experiencing sexual nightmares.

== See also ==
- Amafufunyana
