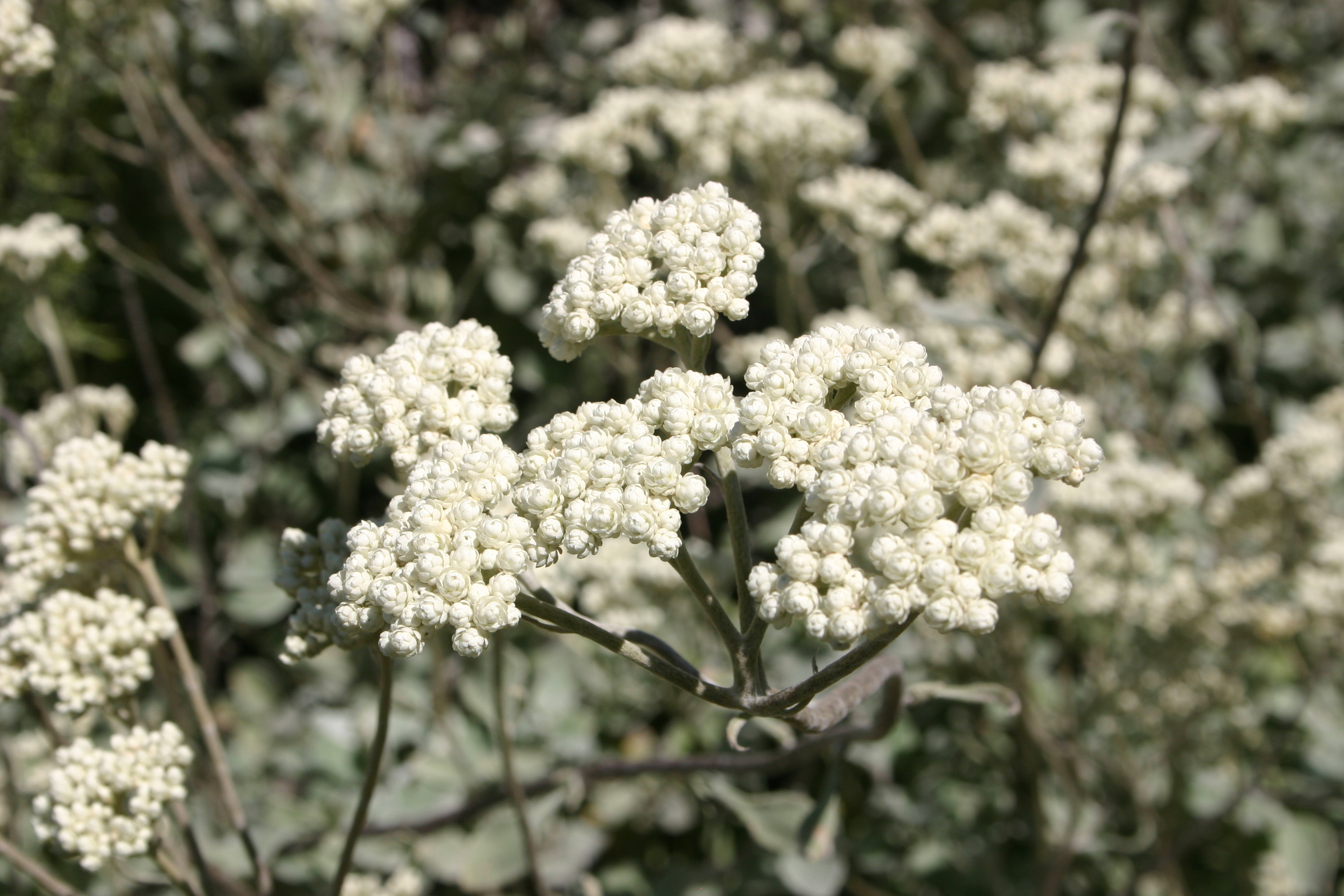

Scientific classification
- Kingdom: Plantae
- Clade: Tracheophytes
- Clade: Angiosperms
- Clade: Eudicots
- Clade: Asterids
- Order: Asterales
- Family: Asteraceae
- Genus: Helichrysum
- Species: H. petiolare

Binomial name
- Helichrysum petiolare Hilliard & B.L.Burtt

Synonyms
- Helichrysum petiolatum D.Don

= Helichrysum petiolare =

Species of flowering plant

Helichrysum petiolare, the licorice-plant or liquorice plant, is a species of flowering plant in the family Asteraceae. It is a subshrub native to the Cape Provinces of South Africa — where it is known as impepho — and to Angola, Zambia, and Zimbabwe. It is naturalized in parts of Portugal and the United States. Growing to about 45 cm (18 in) high and 150 cm (59 in) broad, it is a trailing evergreen subshrub with furry grey-green leaves and small white flowers. Other common names include silver-bush everlastingflower, trailing dusty miller and kooigoed. The foliage has a faint licorice aroma, but Helichrysum petiolare is not closely related to true liquorice, Glycyrrhiza glabra, from which liquorice candy is made.

== Cultivation ==
It is cultivated for its foliage and as groundcover. This plant prefers sun to partial shade with well drained soil, being susceptible to root rot. It is hardy to zones 9–11, in mild or coastal areas where temperatures do not fall below freezing for extended periods. It requires a sheltered position in full sun.

Numerous cultivars have been developed, of which the following have gained the Royal Horticultural Society's Award of Garden Merit:-

- H. petiolare
- 'Goring Silver'
- 'Limelight'
- 'Variegatum'

== Biological ==
The name impepho used in Southern Africa refers to around 250 species from the genus Helichrysum. The Helichrysum species used as impepho grow abundantly in South Africa, Eswatini and Lesotho but especially around coastal areas and the largely arid Northern Cape province. The plants grow abundantly in gardens and in the wild, for this reason most impepho is harvested in the wild and commercial cultivation in South Africa is unknown. Helichrysum species used as impepho are hardy and adaptable, growing in a wide variety of soil types, are drought resistant, wind resistant and can survive light frost. The seeds are wind-dispersed. Little preference is shown for specific types of impepho. Amongst traditional healers, local availability is more important than a preference for a particular species. There is little evidence of medicinal properties being stronger in certain Helichrysum species and for ritual purposes they are all treated as exactly the same. For medicinal and ritual purposes, it is mainly the aerial parts of the plant that are used (most often dried, but also fresh), less commonly the roots.

== Uses ==
Its Afrikaans common name of kooigoed translates as "bedding stuff" and it is still used to provide a soft and aromatic mattress.

The essential oil has been investigated for its anti-microbial, anti-oxidant, and anti-inflammatory properties. In South Africa it forms a component of traditional African medicine. The leaves and twigs are boiled and prepared as a sort of tea to soothe coughs and fever. The leaves are also applied to wounds to prevent infection, and are ceremonially burnt to produce a traditional incense.

== Medicinal uses ==
In its ritual use, impepho is believed to invoke and placate the ancestors and to drive away malicious spirits; Since these are regarded as common causes of illness in African traditional medicine, it is not surprising that imphepho is a very important medicinal plant in this traditional medical field. Apart from its traditional importance, imphepho has been widely researched in recent years. A great deal of scientific and anecdotal evidence seems to support the claims of traditional healers. Impepho is traditionally used as a wound dressing. The plant has proven anti-microbial properties and appears to work effectively as pain relief and as an anti-inflammatory, probably due to various volatile oils and flavonoids. Ash from burnt impepho and fresh or dried aerial parts of the plant are common ingredients in wound dressings; burning the plant causes chemical changes to the plant which affect its healing properties. The oils are said to be of great value in healing scars and acne, imphepho is believed to stimulate cellular regeneration. Impepho is boiled either in water or milk to make a tea, it is used internally to treat coughs, colds, fever, infection, menstrual pain, headaches, insomnia, hypertension and even allergies and diabetes. For pain relief and to treat coughs, colds, bronchitis and other chest infections the plant is burnt and the smoke inhaled. No evidence is available as to how effective imphepho is as a treatment for tuberculosis but the plant's common use in the area and the prevalence of the illness suggest that it may be ineffective.

The papery flowers of various species come in a range of colours with bright to dull yellow, white, pink and orange being most common. They are popular in flower arrangements and have been used in potpourri.

== Ritual uses ==
In traditional rituals and ceremonies impepho is burnt in large quantities. It is usually burnt indoors and traditionally in a barely ventilated hut, the herb is used as incense but in such large quantities that it may resemble fumigation. Before and during consultations with the ancestors for the purposes of divination, seeking wise counsel and insight, or otherwise, Sangomas will burn impepho. The aerial parts of the plant (leaves, twigs and flowers if the plant is in flower) are collected and tied up in tight bundles which are dried. A bundle of impepho can smoulder for quite a long time producing a great deal of smoke. The herb is burnt to invoke, honor and placate the ancestors. Burning impepho is seen as a ritual offering. The plant is mainly used in traditional ceremonies and rituals as well as African traditional medicine, but it may be used privately by individuals from time to time to ward off evil, dispel negativity, for meditation or other such purposes. Despite its mild psychoactive properties the plant is not commonly used recreationally as a mind-altering or consciousness-expanding herb. Unlike many plants with magical properties ascribed to them which are used in traditional medicine and shamanism, Helichrysum species do not contain alkaloids, instead a mixture of flavonoids, volatile oils, sesquiterpenoids and acylated phloroglucinols seem to mimic the effects of alkaloid compounds on the central nervous system. In order to experience the effects of impepho a lot of smoke must be breathed in for a long time. Euphoria, ecstasy, uncontrolled giggling and sedation are commonly experienced by people inhaling impepho smoke. Violent mood swings, mental confusion and personality changes have not been reported. Other symptoms may be more rare and are normally seen in connection to the African traditional beliefs, mild hallucinations (such as seeing everything bathed in a gentle golden light) are seen as 'visions' and "speaking in tongues" has been known. Whether these are a result of the effects of the plant or of the psychological state of those involved in the rituals is uncertain. There is no evidence that even prolonged heavy use of impepho can lead to any sort of physical or psychological dependency and there is no evidence of any health problems arising from prolonged use (apart from those associated with smoke inhalation perhaps). Impepho is an important part of African traditional medicine and rituals and the plant is revered, however little to no effort is made to protect areas in which the plant commonly grows. This may be because the plant is very common in Southern Africa. Although the use of impepho in rituals and ceremonies is normally associated with African traditional beliefs, it is often burned as incense in South African Christian churches. Here it is assumed that its use is similar to that of frankincense and not associated with honouring the ancestors. The plant is commonly available and seldom sold for much money, it is difficult to say whether it is seen as a 'holy' or 'sacred' plant. The plant is believed to increase the spiritual awareness and psychic abilities of those who use it. South African law protects the right of individuals to burn impepho as part of ceremonies and rituals associated with traditional beliefs. The dried bundle of impepho is usually burnt in the middle of a (typically barely-ventilated) room or hut in a potsherd. Smoking impepho through a pipe or in a cigarette is unknown. The smoke has a smell which is not always liked by everyone. It has been described as being similar to mildew and camphor with fenugreek overtones.
