= History of rape =

The concept of rape, both as an abduction and in the sexual sense (not always distinguishable), appears in early religious texts.

Scholars of the Ancient Near East debate whether certain pieces of legislation regarding sexual offences from various states and cultures that have survived to the present day are about "rape" or about various other offences that the individuals involved may have consented to. There are many literary problems that make interpretation of these sex laws difficult, as the meaning of words depend on the context, and the laws often do not provide information about what the people (especially the women) involved in the acts wanted or did not want, and were more concerned about which combinations of individuals were illegitimate in view of the social order. They tended to focus on what a man might do to/with a woman he was not married to, especially if this resulted in the loss of virginity, regardless of whether she consented to it or not. Consequently, one scholar may interpret a law as being about rape, while another scholar concludes it is about consensual adultery, premarital sex etc.

== Mesopotamia ==
According to Scholz (2021), the only law in the Code of Hammurabi (composed c. 1750 BCE) that scholars universally agree relates to rape is § 130:

šum-ma a-wi-lum aš-ša-at a-wi-lim ša zi-ka-ra-am la i-du-u-ma i-na bit a-bi-ša wa-aš-ba-at u-kab-bil-ši-ma i-na zu-ni-ša it-ta-ti-^{b}il-ma iș-șa-ab-tu-šu a-wi-lum šu-u id-da-ak zinništum ši-i u-ta-aš-šar

If a man force the (betrothed) wife of another who has not known a male and is living in her father's house, and he lie in her bosom and they take him, that man shall be put to death and that woman shall go free.

— Robert Francis Harper, The Code of Ḫammurabi King of Babylon, about 2250 B.C. (1904) p. 45

This law is similar to §6 of the Code of Ur-Nammu from Sippar (c. 2100–2050 BCE), and §26 of the Laws of Eshnunna (c. 1930 BCE). The latter has also been compared to Deuteronomy 22:25–27 by Craig S. Keener (1996), who considered both of them rape scenarios; it states the following:

26. If a man gives bride-money for a(nother) man's daughter, but another man seizes her forcibly without asking permission of her father and her mother and deprives her of her virginity, it is a capital offence and he shall die.

Another provision, generally regarded as a marry-your-rapist law, is found in §55 of the Middle Assyrian Laws (c. 1450–1250 BCE):

55. In the case of a seignior's daughter, a virgin who was living in her father's house, whose [father] had not been asked (for her in marriage), whose hymen had not been opened since she was not married, and no one had a claim against her father's house, if a seignior took the virgin by force and ravished her, either in the midst of the city or in the open country or at night in the street or in a granary or at a city festival, the father of the virgin shall take the wife of the virgin's ravisher and give her to be ravished; he shall not return her to her husband (but) take her; the father may give his daughter who was ravished to her ravisher in marriage. If he has no wife, the ravisher shall give the (extra) third in silver to her father as the value of a virgin (and) her ravisher shall marry her (and) not cast her off. If the father does not (so) wish, he shall receive the (extra) third for the virgin in silver (and) give his daughter to whom he wishes.

— Theophile J. Meek, in James B. Pritchard, Ancient Near Eastern Texts Relating to the Old Testament (1969), p. 185.

Similarly, several provisions in the Hittite laws (also known as the 'Code of the Nesilim'; developed c. 1650–1500 BCE, in effect until c. 1100 BCE) are usually categorised by scholars as dealing with either incest, adultery or bestiality; § 197 is the only undisputed rape law:

197. If a man seizes a woman in the mountain, it is the man's crime and he will be killed. But if he seizes her in (her) house, it is the woman's crime and the woman shall be killed. If the husband finds them, he may kill them, there shall be no punishment for him.

— Albrecht Goetze, in James B. Pritchard, Ancient Near Eastern Texts Relating to the Old Testament (1969), p. 196.

Because the Hittite word for 'woman' in this case does not indicate any status, such as whether she is married or unmarried, widowed, free or enslaved, the law seems to have referred to all women in general, and thus that raping a woman was always a crime, not just when she was married or engaged.

In some rare cases, ancient laws did consider the (lack of) consent of a person (particularly a woman) involved a relevant factor in determining whether or not a sexual offence had occurred. Examples include §190 and §191 of the Hittite laws, and §12 of the Middle Assyrian Laws (this one involves a combination of lack of consent on the one hand, and force on the other).

- Hittite laws §190. 'If a man and a woman come willingly, as men and women, and have intercourse, there shall be no punishment. (...)'
- Hittite laws §191. 'If a free man picks up now this woman, now that one, now in this country, then in that country, there shall be no punishment if they came together sexually willingly.'
- Middle Assyrian Laws §12. 'If, as a seignior's wife passed along the street, a(nother) seignior has seized her, saying to her, 'Let me lie with you', since she would not consent (and) kept defending herself, but he has taken her by force (and) lain with her, whether they found him on the seignior's wife or witnesses have charged him that he lay with the woman, they shall put the seignior to death, with no blame attaching to the woman'.

== Ancient Israelites ==
Scholz (2021) stated that the texts of Deuteronomy 22:25–29 'are widely recognized as rape legislation', while Deuteronomy 22:22–24 as well as Deuteronomy 21:10–14 'are more contested and are not usually characterized as rape laws'.

According to the Encyclopaedia Judaica rape itself is not considered to be a criminal offense in Jewish law. The rapist will only be held liable to pay the girls father 50 shekels of silver (as a bride-price), "and she shall be his wife, because he has humbled her; and he may not put her away all his days" (Deut.22:28–29). The exceptions to this are when either the rape is a case of adulterous or incestuous intercourse, or a married woman is found not to have been a virgin (though claiming to be one at the marital stage of her Erusin (kiddushin) she and her seducer are to be stoned to death if the intercourse was consensual (Deut. 22:23–24); however if the woman did not consent only the rapist is to be executed (Deut. 22:25–27).

Under talmudic law, the rapist must also compensate the woman for physical and psychological damage (Ket. 42a–43b). If the victim refuses to marry him, he is then not compelled to marry her (Ket. 39b). If a girl was raped by several men, she can choose which one to marry (TJ, Ket. 3:6, 27d)

== Ancient Europe ==
=== General ===
From the classical antiquity of Greece and Rome into the Colonial period, rape along with arson, treason and murder was a capital offense. "Those committing rape were subject to a wide range of capital punishments that were seemingly brutal, frequently bloody, and at times spectacular."

=== Greek mythology ===
The rape of women or youths is a common theme in Greek mythology. Among the rapes or abductions committed by Zeus, the supreme deity of the Greek pantheon, are Europa, Ganymede, and Leda the Nymph.

The rape of Chrysippus by Laius was known as "the crime of Laius", a term which came to be applied to all male rape. It was seen as an example of hubris in the original sense of the word, i.e., violent outrage, and its punishment was so severe that it destroyed not only Laius himself, but also his son, Oedipus, his wife Jocasta, his grandchildren (including Antigone), and members of his extended family.

=== Ancient Rome ===
In Roman law, raptus (or raptio) meant primarily kidnapping or abduction; sexual violation was a secondary issue. The "abduction" of an unmarried girl from her father's household in some circumstances was a matter of the couple eloping without her father's permission to marry. Rape in the English sense of "forced sex" was more often expressed as stuprum, a sex crime committed through violence or coercion (cum vi or per vim). Raptus ad stuprum, "abduction for the purpose of committing a sex crime," emerged as a legal distinction in the late Roman Republic. The Lex Julia de vi publica, recorded in the early 3rd century CE but dating probably from the dictatorship of Julius Caesar, defined rape as forced sex against "boy, woman, or anyone".

Although Roman law in the historical period recognized rape as a crime, the rape of women is a pervasive theme in the myths and legends of early Rome. The Augustan historian Livy seemed "embarrassed" by the rape motif and emphasizes the redeeming political dimension of traditional stories. The "rape" of the Sabine women was interpreted as showing that Rome was constituted as a "blended" population in which people resolved violence and coexisted by consent and treaty. The rape of the exemplary woman Lucretia by the king's son led to the overthrow of the monarchy and the establishment of the Republic. In the 50s BCE, the Epicurean poet Lucretius condemned rape as a primitive behavior outside the bounds of an advanced civilization, describing it as "a man's use of violent force and imposition of sexual impulse."

Intercourse by force or compulsion, even if it took place under circumstances that were otherwise unlawful or immoral, left the victim legally without blame. The official position under the emperor Diocletian (reigned 284–305 AD) held that:

The laws punish the foul wickedness of those who prostitute their modesty to the lusts of others, but they do not attach blame to those who are compelled to stuprum by force, since it has, moreover, been quite properly decided that their reputations are unharmed and that they are not prohibited from marriage to others.

Although the law recognized the victim's innocence, rhetoric used by the defense indicates that jurors might harbor attitudes of blame.

As a matter of law, rape could be committed only against a citizen in good standing. The rape of a slave could be prosecuted only as damage to the owner's property. People who worked as prostitutes or entertainers, even if they were technically free, suffered infamia, the loss of legal and social standing. A person who made his or her body available for public use or pleasure had in effect surrendered the right to be protected from sexual abuse or physical violence. Men who had been raped "by the force of robbers or the enemy in wartime (vi praedonum vel hostium)" were exempt by law from infamia.

There was no statute of limitations for rape; by contrast adultery, which was criminalized under Augustus, had to be prosecuted within five years. The rape of a freeborn male (ingenuus) or a female virgin is among the worst crimes that could be committed in Rome, along with parricide and robbing a temple. Rape was a capital crime, and the rapist was subject to execution, a rare penalty in Roman law.

The victim's consent was usually not a factor in Roman rape cases, since raptus could refer to a successful seduction as well as abduction or forced sex. What had been violated was primarily the right of the head of household (paterfamilias) to give or withhold his consent. The consequences of an abduction or an elopement were considered a private matter to be determined by the couple and their families, who might choose to recognize the marriage.

=== Late Roman and early Byzantine era ===
Attitudes toward rape changed when the Roman Empire became Christianized. St. Augustine believed Lucretia's suicide was likely prompted by her shame at being violated and her fear over possible accusations of complicity. He also suggests that it might have been an attempt to expiate her guilt over involuntary signs of sexual pleasure which had encouraged Sextus in his abuse. Augustine's interpretation of the rape of Lucretia (in The City of God Against the Pagans 1.19) has generated a substantial body of criticism, starting with a satire by Machiavelli. Historian of early Christianity Peter Brown characterized this section of Augustine's work as his most vituperative attack on Roman ideals of virtue.

The first Christian emperor Constantine redefined rape as a public offense rather than as a private wrong. Since under Roman law raptus could also mean cases of abduction or elopement without the head of household's permission, Constantine ordered that if the female had consented, she should be punished along with the male "abductor" by being burnt alive. If she had not consented, she was still considered an accomplice, "on the grounds that she could have saved herself by screaming for help." As a participant in the rape, she was punished under law by being disinherited, regardless of the wishes of her family. Even if she and her family consented to a marriage as the result of an elopement, the marriage was legally void.

Under the Emperor Justinian I, new penalties were enacted for the abduction (raptus) of nuns. Even attempting the abduction of nuns for marriage or sexual purposes was to be punished by death. Constantine's law against sexual abduction was changed to shift blame to the man, on the assumption that the participation of the woman, even if voluntary, was caused by male seduction. The law for other kinds of sexual violence continued to be handled by means of the older Roman legal principles governing cases of 'stuprum.'

== Medieval Europe ==
In the 12th century, kinsmen of the victim were given the option of executing the punishment themselves. "In England in the early fourteenth century, a victim of rape might be expected to gouge out the eyes and/or sever the offender's testicles herself." Despite the harshness of these laws, actual punishments were usually far less severe: in late Medieval Europe, cases concerning rapes of marriageable women, wives, widows, or members of the lower class were rarely brought forward, and usually ended with only a small monetary fine or a marriage between the victim and the rapist.

Medieval theologian Thomas Aquinas argued that rape, though sinful, was less sinful than masturbation or coitus interruptus, because it fulfilled the procreative function of sex, while the other acts violated the purpose of sex. (Note: Thomas Aquinas, Summa Theologica, question 154. "...it follows that in this matter [the sin of unnatural vice] is gravest of all. After it comes incest... With regard to the other species of lust, they imply a transgression merely of that which is determined by right reason, on the presupposition, however, of natural principles." Here, unnatural vice includes, in decreasing order of sinfulness, bestiality, homosexual intercourse, any unconventional form of heterosexual intercourse, and 'uncleanness' (masturbation). 'Other species of lust' include intercourse with a consecrated virgin or a nun, rape, adultery, the seduction of a virgin, and 'simple fornication' (consensual intercourse between unmarried people.)) A lawsuit against the famous late medieval English writer, Geoffrey Chaucer (1340–1400), demonstrates that the legal term "raptus" could not only be applied to actual cases of rape or sexual assault, but also to the unlicensed transfer of a female servant from one household to another. There was no law against rape during the 16th century in the Dutch Republic.

Roma women were raped by white Romanian men during slavery in Romania.

== Type of crime ==
In some cultures, rape was seen less as a crime against a particular girl or woman than as a crime against the head of the household or against chastity. As a consequence, the rape of a virgin was often a more serious crime than of a non-virgin, even a wife or widow, and the rape of a prostitute or other unchaste woman was, in some laws, not a crime because her chastity could not be harmed. Furthermore, the woman's consent was under many legal systems not a defense. In seventeenth-century France, even marriage without parental consent was classified as rape.

The penalty for rape was often a fine, payable to the father or the husband, as they were in charge of household economy.

In some laws, the woman might marry the rapist instead of him receiving the legal penalty. This was especially prevalent in laws where the crime of rape did not include, as a necessary part, that it be against the woman's will, thus dividing the crime in the current meaning of rape, and a means for a couple to force their families to permit marriage.

Modern doctrines today have different views on the type of crime that rape is; it may be seen as:

- rape as violence (principal wrong is the application of physical violence to the body, it is a physical harm—focuses on the body, on physical pain, injury)
- rape as violation of autonomy (infringes on the right to decide with whom/when to have sexual relations, focuses on the mind; rape of men is seen as serious as rape of women; adopts broad definitions including rape by deception)
- rape as invasion of integrity (a combination of the above views—focuses moderately on both body and mind)
- rape as moral injury (an attack on the dignity of the woman victim, and by extension on the dignity of women as a class, a gendered crime)
- radical feminist explanations of rape (sexual intercourse must be understood in the context of patriarchal society where women face systematic coercion and subordination; under these conditions genuine consent is difficult to be given; Robin Morgan argues: "Rape exists any time sexual intercourse occurs when it has not been initiated by the woman, out of her own genuine affection and desire"). Michelle Madden Dempsey and Jonathan Herring argue in Why Sexual Penetration Requires Justification, that sexual penetration of a woman by a man is a prima facie wrong, meaning that it requires justification in order to validate it, because of "the use of physical force required to achieve sexual penetration, the occurrence and risk of harm posed by sexual penetration, and the negative social meaning of sexual penetration in patriarchal societies."

== Islamic conception ==
According to a Sunni hadith, the punishment for committing rape is death, there is no sin on the victim, nor is there any worldly punishment ascribed to her. Most scholars treat rape as hirabah (disorder in the land).

Rape is defined as zina bil jabr, fornication/adultery with the use of coercion or compulsion. Note that it has to be extra-marital, i.e. fornication/adultery; the rape charge cannot be brought against the husband by the wife, i.e. it cannot be within marriage, nor can it be between a man and his female slave, a man having the right to sexual intercourse with his female slave. The Islamic law approach to rape provides a range of possible charges, and thus penalties, which the qadi may posit, hirabah being but one, yet the most severe of them. Thus the charge of zina may bring about a penalty of 100 lashes upon the perpetrator and the element of the use of force and or compulsion may be quantified, and thus punished serially or consecutively, that is a year's banishment, a prison sentence, a corporal sentence etc. Hirabah is a Hadd penalty (i.e. one predicating a fixed choice, which in the case of Hirabah has three options at the discretion of the qadi). If the offence is deemed to not be a Hirabah offence, then the penalties available to the qadi would be those of ta'zeer and will not be permitted (according to some Islamic jurisprudence schools) to reach the level of either severe retributive physical harm (i.e. more than ten lashes of a whip) let alone execution, if the judge chooses to carry out physical punishment.

The interpretation and application of these laws is very controversial, not least due to modern ill-fated legislation, such as Pakistan's Hudood Ordinance, under General Zia ul-Haq, which arguably criminalizes the victim who fails to produce four witnesses, thus perverting the aim behind the law, to protect the victim of rape and grant her justice.

According to Professor Oliver Leaman, the required testimony of four witnesses who eyewitnessed the actual penetration applies only to consensual illicit sexual relations (whether adultery or fornication), not to the non-consensual crime of rape. The role of the four male witnesses is to testify that they eyewitnessed not only an illicit sexual encounter, but to testify also that the participants consensually partook in it.

The requirements for proof of rape, by contrast, are less stringent, and do not require any extraneous witness testimony, eyewitness or otherwise:

Rape charges can be brought and a case proven based on the sole testimony of the victim, providing that circumstantial evidence supports the allegations. It is these strict criteria of proof which lead to the frequent observation that where injustice against women does occur, it is not because of Islamic law. It happens either due to misinterpretation of the intricacies of the Sharia laws governing these matters, or cultural traditions; or due to corruption and blatant disregard of the law, or indeed some combination of these phenomena.

In Islamic military jurisprudence, classical jurists laid down severe penalties for rebels who use "stealth attacks" and "spread terror". In this category, Muslim jurists included abductions, poisoning of water wells, arson, attacks against wayfarers and travellers (highway robbery), assaults under the cover of night, and rape. The punishment for such crimes were severe, including death, regardless of the political convictions and religion of the perpetrator.

== War rape ==
Rape, in the course of warfare, also dates back to antiquity, ancient enough to have been mentioned in the Bible. According to the Roman ius gentium ("law of nations" or international law), inhabitants of a conquered town were spared personal violence if the war or siege ended through diplomatic negotiations. But if the army victoriously entered the town by force, the conquering men could and would rape women (and sometimes adolescent boys) of the defeated peoples as one of the spoils of war. Some portion or all of the population of a town taken by force might also become slaves, who lacked legal protections against rape and who might be exploited as prostitutes or non-consensual sexual companions.

Rape, as an adjunct to warfare, was prohibited by the military codices of Richard II and Henry V (1385 and 1419 respectively). These laws formed the basis for convicting and executing rapists during the Hundred Years' War (1337–1453).

Napoleon Bonaparte found rape committed by soldiers particularly distasteful. During his Egyptian Expedition, he declared that "everywhere, the rapist is a monster" and ordered that "anyone guilty of rape would be shot".

War rape as well as abduction of women was common both on behalf and Spanish and Mapuches in the Arauco War in Chile.

== Bride kidnapping ==
Bride kidnapping, a practice where a man abducts a woman he wishes to marry, may feature rape, but this is not necessarily so. In medieval Europe, a woman might agree to be "raped" (in the sense of "abducted") by the man she loved in order to elope, thereby circumventing the need to obtain consent for their union from disapproving parents. Currently, the practice of bride capture has become elaborate and ritualised in some cultures. Bride capture is common in the cultures of Central Asia, and is also found in Southern Europe and is additionally practised traditionally by the Hmong. It is criminalized in most nations. Bride kidnapping also frequently involves child marriage.

== Modern reevaluation ==
In 1563, the Council of Trent expressly declared that legal Catholic marriages had to be done with consent of both parties, but did not require parental consent, essentially declaring forced marriages invalid. This was not universally accepted: for example, in France, women were not granted the right to marry without parental consent until 1793.

The criminal justice system of many countries was widely regarded as unfair to sexual assault victims. Both sexist stereotypes and common law combined to make rape a "criminal proceeding on which the victim and her behavior were tried rather than the defendant".

Adult women were often extremely reluctant to bring up charges of rape: public admission of having been raped was severely damaging to one's social standing, courts tended to be skeptical of the charges, conviction rates were low, and, in the event that the accusation could not be proved, the victim could then be accused of committing adultery with the rapist (traditionally a serious offense that could have been punished by mutilation or even death). Certain classes of women, such as prostitutes, were banned from raising accusations of rape altogether.

In the United States, before and during the American Civil War when chattel slavery was widespread, laws against rape were focused primarily on instances of black men raping white women, real or imagined. The penalty for such a crime in many jurisdictions was death or castration. The rape of a black woman, by any man, was considered legal. In some states during the 1950s, a white woman having consensual sex with a black man was considered rape.

Since the 1970s, many changes have occurred in the perception of sexual assault due in large part to the feminist movement and its public characterization of rape as a crime of power and control rather than purely of sex. In some countries the women's liberation movement of the 1970s created the first rape crisis centers. This movement was led by the National Organization for Women in the U.S. One of the first two rape crisis centers in the United States, the D.C. Rape Crisis Center, opened in 1972. It was created to promote sensitivity and understanding of rape and its effects on the victim.

Marital rape first became a crime in the United States in the state of South Dakota in 1975. In 1993, North Carolina became the last state to outlaw marital rape. The marital rape exemption was abolished in England and Wales in 1991 by the Appellate Committee of the House of Lords, in the case of R v R.

In the 1980s, date or acquaintance rape first gained acknowledgment. Rape crisis centers were created to serve survivors of all forms of sexual violence during any phase of their healing process. Rape crisis centers and other community-based service providers continue to grow and serve their communities by providing direct services and prevention programming.

On September 2, 1998, the United Nations International Criminal Tribunal for Rwanda delivered a precedent-setting verdict that made sexual violence a war crime. This was followed in November 1998 by the decision of the International Criminal Tribunal for the former Yugoslavia that acts of rape may constitute torture under international humanitarian law.

Current topics being debated are the marginalized victims of rape—domestic violence and rape victims, marital rape victims, male rape victims of both male and female rapists, female-female rape victims, parental-rape incest victims, and child sexual abuse victims. Other emerging issues are the concept of victim blaming and its causes, male rape survivors, male-male rape, female sexual aggression, new theories of rape and gender, date rape drugs and their effects as well as the psychological effects of rape trauma syndrome.

The ius primae noctis ("law of the first night") is a term now popularly used to describe a supposed legal right allowing the lord of an estate to take the virginity of his serfs' maiden daughters. Little or no historical evidence has been unearthed from the Middle Ages to support the idea that such a right ever actually existed, although it may have simply been a habit of lords that could not be challenged by victims or their families due to the lord's status.

== See also ==
- Raptio
- Bride kidnapping
- Violence against women
- Genocidal rape
