= The Girl from Tomorrow (film) =

2023 Italian film by Marta Savina

- Directed by: Marta Savina
- Produced by: Virginia Valsecchi
- Starring: Claudia Gusmano; Francesco Colella; Dario Aita
- Cinematography: Francesca Amitrano
- Music by: Yakamoto Kotzuga
- Distributed by: Europictures
- Release date: March 9, 2023 (Italy)
- Running time: 97 minutes
- Country: Italy
- Language: Italian
- Box office: $260,818

The Girl From Tomorrow (Italian: Primadonna) is a 2023 film directed by Marta Savina, her first feature film inspired by the story of Franca Viola. Released in theaters the following year, the film was presented in competition at the David di Donatello 2024.

== Background ==
The film is inspired by the story of Franca Viola, the first woman to refuse to marry her rapist, and who became a symbol of Italian growth and the emancipation of courageous women.

== Plot ==
Lia Crimi lives with her family in 1960s southern Italy; her father is a farmer, and her mother is a housewife. Lia loves working the land and taking care of her little brother Mario.

For Christmas 1966, one of her admirers, Lorenzo Musicò, returns to the village after a trip to Germany. The young man seems very much in love with Lia, but the girl does not reciprocate his attentions because she finds him too arrogant. Musicò does not seem to want to give up Lia, so he kidnaps her, attempting to marry her by force.

With the support of her family, Lia decides not to give in to social pressure and sues Musicò, accusing him of kidnapping and rape. Following her decision, the entire town turns its back on the Crimi family and supports Musicò, who belongs to a very influential family in the area. A legal battle follows, challenging the tradition of reparatory marriage during that time.

== Cast ==
- Claudia Gusmano as Lia Crimi
- Fabrizio Ferracane as Pietro Crimi
- Francesco Colella as Lawyer Amedeo Orlando
- Manuela Ventura as Sara Crimi
- Dario Aita as Lorenzo Musicò
- Thony as Ines Faranda
- Gaetano Aronica as Lawyer Ragona
- Paolo Pierobon as Dona Zaina
