= Beatrice Monroy =

Italian writer

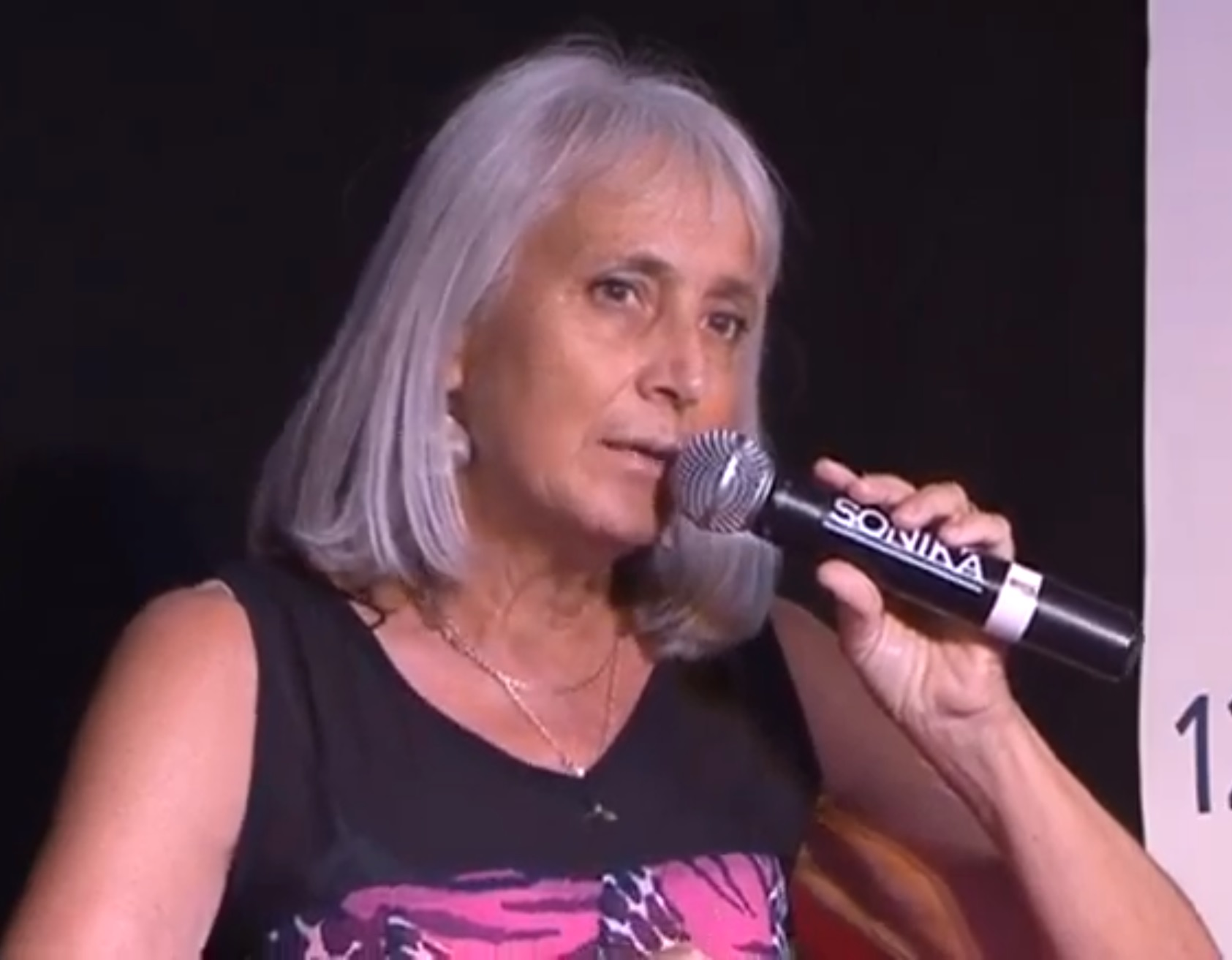
Monroy speaks at "...PERCHÉ DONNE" CGIL Bari violence against women discussion in 2013

Beatrice Monroy (born 1953) is an Italian writer and dramatist.

== Biography ==
Beatrice Monroy was born and lives in Palermo, having spent many years in various Italian cities and abroad in France and the United States. She is the daughter of Anna Oddo Monroy and Italian-American scientist Alberto Monroy.

She is an author of short stories, theatrical texts, and novels. In 2005 she wrote the poem "Portella della Ginestra: Indice dei nomi proibiti," in which she recalled the Portella della Ginestra massacre on 1 May 1947. The subtitle "Index of Prohibited Names" evokes the historical Index of Prohibited Books and refers to the instigators of the crime, still officially unknown.

In 2012 her book Niente ci fu ('There was nothing') was published, dedicated to the life of rape survivor Franca Viola, who rebelled against forced marriage in Sicily. Franca Viola, interviewed by Concita De Gregorio, told her truth about this sequence of events in her life.

Monroy's novel Oltre il vasto oceano: memoria parziale di bambina (Beyond the vast ocean: A girl's partial memory) was nominated for the Strega Prize in 2014, and it won the 2014 Kaos Prize. The next year, 2015, Monroy published her novel Dido: operetta pop, a modern Dido's journey "halfway between the epic and the comic, legend and reality, the mythic and the contemporary."

Beatrice Monroy works in cooperation with Rai 3 Radio, directs an editorial series titled Passaggi di donne ('Passages of women'), and has conducted writing workshops for women who were victims of violence. She teaches dramaturgy at the School of Arts and Theatrical Performance Trades at the Biondo Theater Company of Palermo directed by Emma Dante.

== Works ==
- Uccisioni stesso luogo stessa gente ('Murders, same place, same people'), Massa Carrara: Società editrice Apuana, 1990
- Noi, i palermitani ('We, the Palermitans), Genoa: Marietti, 1991, ISBN 978-8821168918
- Palermo in tempo di peste ('Palermo in the time of plague'), Palermo: Edizioni della Battaglia, 1992
- Barbablu : il volo il delitto ('Bluebeard: The flight, the crime'), Palermo: Edizioni della battaglia, 2002
- Portella della Ginestra. Indice dei nomi proibiti ('Portella della Ginestra: Index of prohibited names'), presentation by Carmelo Diliberto, preface by Gianguido Palumbo, introduction by Fabrizio Loreto, Rome: Ediesse, 2005, ISBN 978-8823010482
- Carmelo e gli altri : un racconto ('Carmelo and the others: A story'), Rome: Liberetà, 2006
- Tutti in scena : manuale per laboratori di teatro e drammaturgia ('Everybody onstage: Manual for theater and dramaturgy workshops'), Molfetta: La Meridiana, 2010, ISBN 978-8861531345
- Elegia delle donne morte ('Elegy for the dead women'), Marsala/Palermo: Navarra, 2011 ISBN 978-88-95756-48-6
- Niente ci fu ('There was nothing'), Beatrice Monroy, Molfetta: La Meridiana, 2012, ISBN 978-8861532724
- Marius Scalesi, il ragazzo di razza incerta ('Marius Scalesi, the lad of uncertain race'), Molfetta: La Meridiana, 2013, ISBN 978-8861533752
- Oltre il vasto oceano : memoria parziale di bambina ('Beyond the vast ocean: A girl's partial memory'), Rome: Avagliano, 2013, ISBN 978-8883093760
- Il libro delle vergini imprudenti (The book of impulsive virgins), a collective novel by Enzo Di Pasquale, Rossella Floridia, Adriana Iacono, Beatrice Monroy, Muriel Pavoni, and Elena Pistillo. Palermo: Navarra Editore, 2014, ISBN 978-8898865017
- Dido: operetta pop ('Dido: A pop operetta'), Rome: Avagliano, 2015, ISBN 978-8883092930

== Bibliography ==
- "Bibliografia".
- "Bibiliografia ragionata".
- "Violenza di genere. Una bibliografia ragionata" (PDF).
- "Sapere per saper essere. Appunti per percorsi educativi su mafie, diritti, cittadinanza" (PDF). Archived from the original (PDF) on August 28, 2016.
- "WUZ: Il social dei libri".
- Salvatore Costantino, Stato di diritto, fiducia, cooperazione, legalità e sviluppo in Sicilia: analisi, ricerche, pratiche, percorsi, Milan: Franco Angeli, 2008.
- Augusto Balloni, Roberta Bisi, and Salvatore Costantino (eds.), Legalità e comunicazione: una sfida ai processi di vittimizzazione, Milan: Franco Angeli, 2008.
- Gianpaola Costabile, C come camorra, preface by Don Luigi Ciotti, Naples: Rogiosi, 2015.
- Maria Rosa Cutrufelli, I bambini della ginestra, Milan: Frassinelli, 2012.
- Fulvio Abbate, Il rosa e il nero: Palermo trent'anni dopo Mauro de Mauro, Genoa: Zona, 2001.
- Roselina Salemi, Ragazzi di Palermo, Milan: Rizzoli, 1993.
- Immagini Italiane, ed. by Melissa Harris, Aperture Foundation, 1993.
- (in English) Renate Siebert, Secret of Life and Death: Women and the Mafia, Verso, 1996.
- Nino Aquila, Lino Piscopo, Il teatro di prosa a Palermo: luoghi, spettacoli, persone, memorie dal 17. secolo, con una nota di Bruno Caruso, Palermo: Guida, 2001.
- Leggere, Volume 4, Edizioni 35–36, R. Archinto, 1991.
- Sipario, Edizioni 547–552, Sipario, 1994.
- L'espresso, Volume 44, Edizioni 5–8, Editrice L'Espresso, 1998.
- Patalogo: Teatro, Volumi 29–30, Ubulibri, 2006.
- "Silvæ n. 45".
