= Stolen Women in Medieval England =

2013 nonfiction book by Caroline Dunn

Stolen Women in Medieval England: Rape, Abduction, and Adultery, 1100-1500 is a monograph written by Caroline Dunn and published in 2013 by Cambridge University Press. The book analyzes medieval legal records to explore the descriptive and legal complexities behind sexual offenses like rape, abduction, and adultery.

== Synopsis ==
In this book Dunn explores the medieval concept of raptus. At the time, this term covered several different acts that are now treated as separate crimes. In her research, Dunn analyzed 1200 cases of women being seized over a 400-year period. Ninety-six per cent of her data comes from royal court records, while the rest comes from church and local courts. To focus specifically on women, Dunn left out kidnappings involving ransoms, labor disputes, and wardships. Dunn found that these types of issues usually involved men rather than women.

The researched records were original legal documents, utilized to find long-term patterns. However, these records were written using strict legal formulas and specific language. Because the documents were created to meet court requirements, they focus on legal details and tend to leave out the personal perspectives of the women involved. In this book it can be seen that Dunn’s large sample size and use of original records allow her to identify long-term patterns despite the incomplete survival of historical documents. Her research prioritizes historical women over literary figures.

=== First chapter ===
In the first chapter of this book, Dunn looks at the shades of meaning behind the medieval concept of raptus. Historically, this term and its derivatives were based on the idea of forcible seizure or theft. The shades of meaning applied equally to individuals, such as a spouse or an heir, and possessions, such as livestock or goods. The etymological origin of the word raptus mostly meant the act of taking by force. However, medieval usage was not always consistent. The term historically oscillated between describing the abduction of a person or an object and sexual assault.

13th century legal records suggest that raptus more frequently denoted sexual assault rather than abduction during this period. Documents generally used the term to refer to sexual violence, though this was not an absolute rule. In the 14th Century, the terminology reached a "peak of ambiguity." The introduction of specific Chancery writs required the use of the dual phrase rapuit et abduxit, meaning seized and carried away. Thus, further complicating the distinction between the two acts.

Dunn provides a revisionist analysis of the Statutes of Westminster I in 1275 and Westminster II in 1285. Many scholars argue these laws represented a shift in legal focus, that moved away from protecting the rights of women toward prioritizing the interests of the Crown and the victim's family. Hence, while Dunn acknowledges an increasing official focus on the crime of abduction, she disputes the idea that this shift resulted in the legal or social de-prioritization of sexual violence or the experiences of the women involved.

== About the book ==
Within 254 pages, the organization of the book is as follows:

Introduction

1. Laws and legal definitions
2. Rape
3. Abduction and forced marriage
4. Elopement
5. Adultery
6. Retaliatory abductions and malicious legal proceedings

Appendix i: Ravishment legislation
Appendix ii: Sources of ravishment cases
Bibliography
Index

== About the author ==
Caroline Dunn is a professor of History at Clemson University. Her research endeavors are European history and the British Isles between 1000-1500 with a focus on Women, Gender and Sexuality in the social and political spheres. She has written two books: Stolen Women in Medieval England: Rape, Abduction, and Adultery c. 1100-1500 (Cambridge, 2012) and Ladies in Waiting in Medieval England (2025). Her teaching focus is undergraduate Middle Ages and early British Isles and upper-level courses are medieval women, crusades and conquests, aristocratic society, and preindustrial food.
