= The Most Beautiful Wife =

1970 film by Damiano Damiani

- Directed by: Damiano Damiani
- Written by: Damiano Damiani; Enrico Ribulsi; Sofia Scandurra
- Starring: Ornella Muti; Alessio Orano; Tano Cimarosa; Pierluigi Aprà; Joe Sentieri
- Cinematography: Franco Di Giacomo
- Edited by: Antonio Siciliano
- Music by: Ennio Morricone
- Release date: 12 March 1970
- Running time: 108 minutes
- Country: Italy
- Language: Italian

The Most Beautiful Wife (Italian: La moglie più bella) is a 1970 Italian film directed by Damiano Damiani, based on the 1965 case of Franca Viola, who challenged the still frequent southern Italian custom of kidnapping and raping a prospective bride for refusing to marry her abductor. It was the debut film for the then 14-year-old Ornella Muti.

== Synopsis ==
Francesca is a young peasant girl who has caught the eye of Vito, a promising mafioso. She is initially pleased with the man's attention and the two agree to wed. This bliss is short-lived as she soon discovers that he is a violent, jealous, and possessive man who expects complete and abject obedience from her; after witnessing a mob killing, she decides to rebel against the impending marriage. Unwilling to lose face, Vito decides to imprison Francesca on a farm, where he rapes her. His goal is to force her into a fuitina or "rehabilitating marriage", as customs dictate that a woman should marry the one who took her virginity, whether the encounter was willing or not.

He releases Francesca shortly after their encounter, and she is forced to attend an engagement dinner party with his relatives and her parents, an experience which seems surreal and humiliating for her and her parents. The following day, she tries to seek legal justice. The police allows her her file a report in the hopes that they might be able to arrest Vito under the pretext of these allegations. She soon discovers, however, that no one is willing to support her. They either fear that Vito will seek revenge as he is now the acting head of one of the local organized crime families as well as the nephew of the influential mafioso Don Antonio, or else believe his lies that Francesca is only stirring up trouble because he changed his mind about going ahead with the marriage after supposedly discovering she had been a promiscuous girl who had lied about being a virgin. Despite this, Francesca perseveres and presses charges. The resulting scandal, Vito's attempts at revenge and intimidation, and attempts by her parents to convince her to keep things quiet makes life difficult for Francesca; however, in the end, she triumphs and Vito is thrown into jail. The movie ends with a view of Francesca walking alone down a city street.

== Cast ==
- Ornella Muti as Francesca Cimarosa
- Alessio Orano as Vito Juvara
- Pierluigi Aprà as Carabinieri Lieutenant
- Tano Cimarosa as Gaetano Cimarosa
- Joe Sentieri as Poidomani
- Amerigo Tot as Don Antonino Stella
- Enzo Andronico as Vito Juvara's Lawyer

== Production ==
Filming took place in Cinisi, Partinico, Trappeto, and also in the ruins of Gibellina and Santa Ninfa. Actress Ornella Muti was brought in to portray Francesca Cimarosa, her film debut. As she was fourteen at the time of filming, the movie was subject to strict film regulations, one of which was that there should be no depiction of an on- screen rape.

Damiani and the other writers chose to have the script differ in several ways from the kidnapping, rape, and prosecution in the real-life case of Franca Viola. Scholar Niamh Cullen notes that Francesca's behavior bears more similarity to that of feminists of the 60s and 70s, whereas upon rescue, the real-life Franca had reportedly accepted the impending marriage as a grim and unwanted inevitability. Reactions from the police and her family also differed, as she points out that reporting showed that her family had been very supportive and that the police investigation had demonstrated no reluctance to prosecute.

== Reception ==
DVD Talk reviewed the film favorably, praising the cinematography and the acting of Ornella Muti, comparing her favorably to Brooke Shields in Louis Malle's Pretty Baby, stating that "She carries the role magnificently, especially when battling for her self-respect against heavy odds."

=== Awards ===
- Grolla d'oro for Best Debut Actress (Ornella Muti, won)
