= Franca Viola =

Italian victims' rights advocate

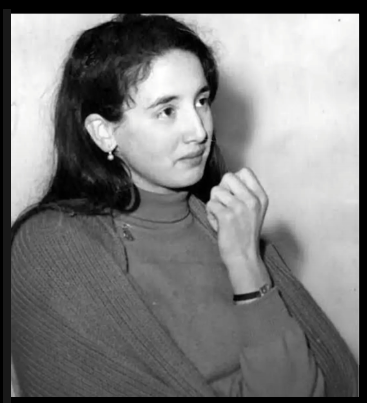
- Viola in 1970
- Born: 9 January 1948 (age 78); Alcamo, Sicily, Italy
- Spouse: Giuseppe Ruisi (m. 1968)
- Children: 3
- Parents: Bernardo Viola (father); Vita Serro (mother)

Franca Viola (born 9 January 1948) is a Sicilian woman who became famous in the 1960s in Italy for refusing a "rehabilitating marriage" (Italian: matrimonio riparatore) with her rapist after being kidnapped, held hostage for over one week, and raped frequently. She is considered to be the first Italian woman who had been raped to publicly refuse marriage, as she and her family instead successfully prosecuted the rapist. The trial had a wide resonance in Italy, as Viola's choice clashed with traditional social conventions in Southern Italy, whereby a woman would lose her honour if she refused to marry the man to whom she had lost her virginity. Franca Viola became a symbol of the cultural progress and emancipation of women in post-war Italy.

== Kidnapping and rape ==
Franca Viola was born in the rural town of Alcamo, Sicily, the elder daughter of Bernardo Viola (1918–1983), a farmer, and his wife, Vita Serro (1923–2026). In 1963, at the age of 15, she became engaged to Filippo Melodia, then aged 23, a nephew of mafia member Vincenzo Rimi. Melodia was subsequently arrested for theft, and Viola's father insisted she break off the engagement, which she did. Melodia then moved to Germany. By 1965 Viola was engaged to another man, and Melodia had returned to Alcamo and was trying unsuccessfully to re-enter Viola's life, stalking her and threatening both her father and fiancé.

In the early hours of 26 December 1965, Melodia and a group of 12 armed companions broke into the Viola home and kidnapped Franca by dragging her into a car, in the process beating up Viola's mother and also taking Franca's eight-year-old brother Mariano, who refused to let go of his sister. Mariano was released a few hours later, but Franca was held for eight days in the home of Melodia's sister and her husband, a farmhouse on the outskirts of the town, where she was repeatedly raped. Melodia told her that now she would be forced to marry him so as not to become a "dishonoured" woman, but Viola replied that she had no intention of marrying him and, moreover, that she would have him sued for kidnapping and rape. On 31 December, Melodia contacted Viola's father Bernardo for the paciata (Sicilian for 'appeasement', i.e., striking a deal between the families of the man and woman who "eloped"). Bernardo pretended to negotiate with the kidnappers, saying he agreed and consented to the marriage, while collaborating with the Carabinieri police in preparing a successful dragnet operation. Viola was freed and her kidnappers arrested on 2 January 1966, seven days before her eighteenth birthday. She said her father asked her if she really wanted to marry Melodia and, when she said she did not, he told her he would do everything possible to help her.

== Refusal of a "rehabilitating marriage" ==
Melodia offered Viola a so-called "rehabilitating marriage," but she refused, thus acting against what was the common practice in Sicilian society at the time. According to traditional social norms, this choice would make her a donna svergognata, or 'woman without honour' (literally: a 'shameless woman'), as she had lost her virginity but remained unwed. These concepts were not exclusive to Sicily or rural areas; to some extent, they were also implicit in the Italian Penal Code of the time, namely Article 544, which equated rape to a crime against "public morality" rather than a personal offence, and formalized the idea of a "rehabilitating marriage" (matrimonio riparatore), stating that a rapist who married his victim would have his crime automatically expunged.

== Trial ==
After Viola's refusal to marry the man who raped her, her family members were reportedly ostracized and menaced by most townspeople. Their vineyard and barn were burned. These events, and the eventual trial, resonated with the Italian media and public. Parliament itself was directly involved, as it became obvious that part of the existing legal code was at odds with public opinion.

Melodia's lawyers claimed Viola had consented to a so-called fuitina ('elopement'), fleeing voluntarily to get married secretly rather than being kidnapped, but the trial (which happened in 1966) found Melodia guilty. He was sentenced to 11 years in prison, later reduced to 10 years, with a two-year period of compulsory residence in Modena. Five of his friends were acquitted, and the others received relatively mild sentences. Melodia was released from prison in 1976, and was killed on 13 April 1978 in a mafia-style execution before he could return to Sicily.

The article of law whereby a rapist could vacate his crime by marrying his victim was not abolished until 1981. Sexual violence became a crime against the person (instead of against "public morality") only in 1996.

== Marriage and later life ==
Franca Viola married Giuseppe Ruisi in December 1968, when she was almost 21 years old. They had liked each other since childhood. Ruisi, an accountant, insisted he would have married the girl he had long loved despite threats and rumours, but had to request a firearms license after obtaining the marriage license, to protect himself and his bride-to-be. Both the Italian President Giuseppe Saragat and Pope Paul VI publicly expressed their appreciation of Franca Viola's courage and their solidarity with the couple. President Saragat sent the couple a wedding gift and the Pope received them in a private audience soon after the wedding. Viola and Ruisi would go on to have two sons and one daughter. As of 2009, the family still lived in Alcamo.

== Legacy ==
In 1970, director Damiano Damiani made the film The Most Beautiful Wife, starring Ornella Muti, based on Viola's case. In 2012, the Sicilian writer Beatrice Monroy published Viola's story under the title Niente ci fu ('There was nothing'). In 2017, a fifteen-minute film based on Viola's story, titled Viola, Franca, was a finalist in the Manhattan Short Film Festival.

The 2022 film The Girl from Tomorrow (La ragazza del futuro) directed by Marta Savina tells the story of Viola though the names and some details were changed.

== See also ==
- Bride kidnapping
- Marry-your-rapist law
