= Joe Sentieri =

Italian singer

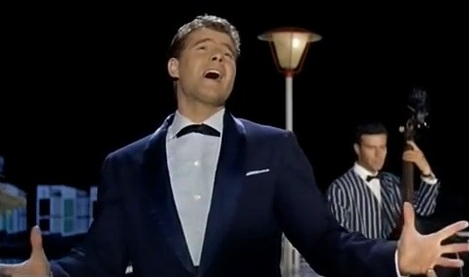
Joe Sentieri in Caccia al marito (1960)

Rino Luigi Sentieri (3 March 1925 in Genoa – 27 March 2007 in Pescara), known professionally as Joe Sentieri, was an Italian singer and actor.

== Career ==
His first success was the winning of the competition Canzonissima in 1959 with his version of the number one hit "Piove (Ciao, ciao bambina)" by Domenico Modugno. In the same year he reached number two and number five in the Italian charts with "Ritroviamoci" and "Milioni di scintille". He won the third place with "Quando vien la sera" at the Sanremo Music Festival 1960. This song was number two in the Italian charts. Another top ten success was "È mezzanotte", which reached number eight.

Perhaps his internationally best known song is "Uno dei tanti". The song written by Carlo Donida and Giulio Rapetti was released in 1961. In 1963 Jerry Leiber and Mike Stoller translated the text into English and it was first recorded by Ben E. King. It was released under the title "I (Who Have Nothing)". It was covered by many vocalist, e.g. by Tom Jones, Gladys Knight, Manfred Mann's Earth Band, Sylvester James, Luther Vandross and Shirley Bassey.

Further songs which had an entry in the Italian charts were "Libellule" (1961), "Lei" (1961), "Cipria di sole" (1962), "Tobia" (1962), "Fermate il mondo" (1963) and "Quando ci si vuol bene... (come noi)" (1963).

In the 1960s and the 1970s Sentieri was also seen in some films, e.g. in Howlers in the Dock (1960) with Adriano Celentano and in The Most Beautiful Wife (1970) with Ornella Muti.

Sentieri died from cerebral hemorrhage in a hospital in Pescara. He is survived by his wife Dora and two children.

== Selected filmography ==
- Urlatori alla sbarra (1960) as Joe il rosso
- The Two Rivals (1960)
- Sanremo - La grande sfida (1960)
- A Qualcuna Piace Calvo (1960) - Cantante del Sing-Sing
- Caccia al marito (1960) - Himself
- Bellezze sulla spiaggia (1961)
- Io bacio... tu baci (1961)
- Tartarin of Tarascon (1962) - Le chanteur dans le wagon du train
- Appuntamento in Riviera (1962) - Himself
- The Shortest Day (1963) - Soldato (uncredited)
- Three Nights of Love (1964)
- Prega Dio... e scavati la fossa! (1968)
- The Most Beautiful Wife (1970) - Poidomani
- I Am Afraid (1977) - Tognon (final film role)
