= Dario Aita =

Italian actor (born 1987)

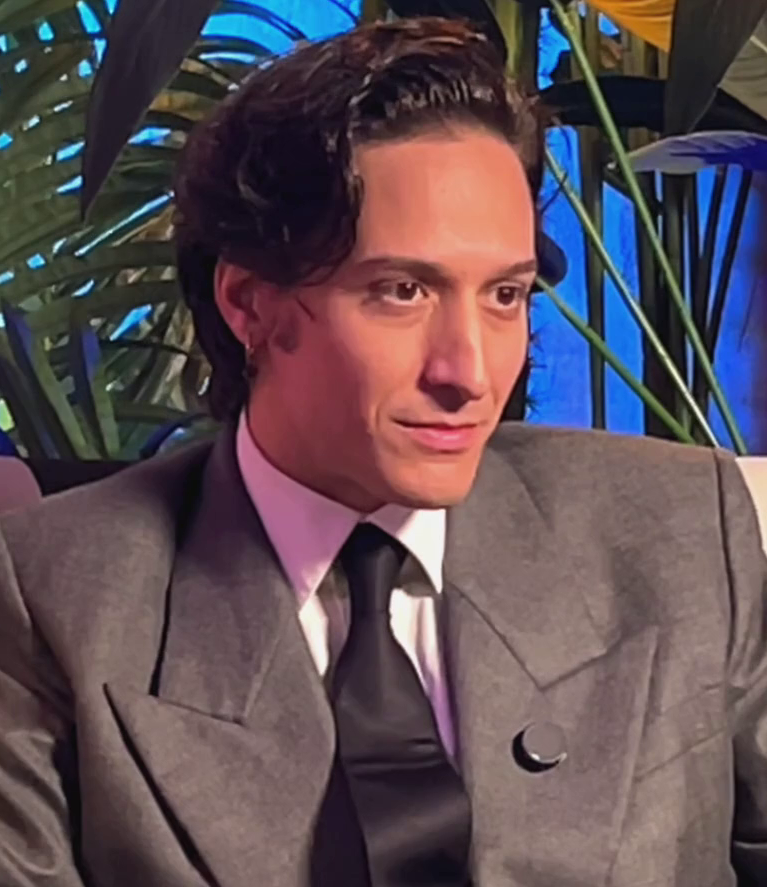
- Aita in 2024
- Born: 25 January 1987 (age 39); Palermo, Italy
- Occupation: Actor

Dario Aita (born 25 January 1987) is an Italian film, television, and stage actor.

== Life and career ==
Born in Palermo, Aita got a Liceo Classico degree before moving to Genoa, where he graduated from the Teatro Stabile di Genova drama school. He made his stage debut in 2004, in a theatrical rendition of Hamlet. In 2009, he made his film debut in Renato De Maria's The Front Line.

=== Personal life ===
Aita has been in a relationship with actress Elena Gigliotti since 2013, and they had a daughter in 2024. His brother Emmanuele is also an actor.

== Filmography ==
=== Film ===
Year	Title	Role	Notes
2009	The Front Line	Massimo	
2015	Finché c'è vita c'è speranza	Antonio	Short film
2016	Coffee	Renzo	Segment: "Italia"
2016	La cena di Natale	Mario Labbate	
2021	Il giorno e la notte	Manfredi	
2021	State a casa	Paolo	
2022	The Girl from Tomorrow	Lorenzo Musicò	
2024	Parthenope	Sandrino	
2026	Franco Battiato - Il lungo viaggio	Franco Battiato	

=== Television ===
Year	Title	Role	Notes
2011	The Secret of Water	Sergio Basso	Main role
2012–2018	Questo nostro amore	Bernardo Strano	Main role
2014	Il giudice meschino	Salvo	Television movie
2015	Grand Hotel	Jacopo Alibrandi	2 episodes
2015	Il candidato	Valerio	Episode: "I giovani"
2016–2018	The Mafia Kills Only in Summer	Rosario Trischitta	Recurring role
2016–2018	L'allieva	Arthur Malcomess	Main role (season 1); recurring (season 2)
2018	Prima che la notte	Claudio Fava	Television movie
2018	Cacciatore: The Hunter	Pasquale Di Filippo	Recurring role (season 1)
2020–2022	Don Matteo	Sergio La Cava	Main role (season 12); guest star (season 13)
2022	Noi	Claudio Pierò	Main role
2023–2024	The Law According to Lidia Poët	Andrea Caracciolo	Main role (season 1), guest star (season 2)
2025	Un professore	Leone Rocci	Main role (season 3)
