= Amerigo Tot =

Hungarian sculptor and actor (1909–1984)

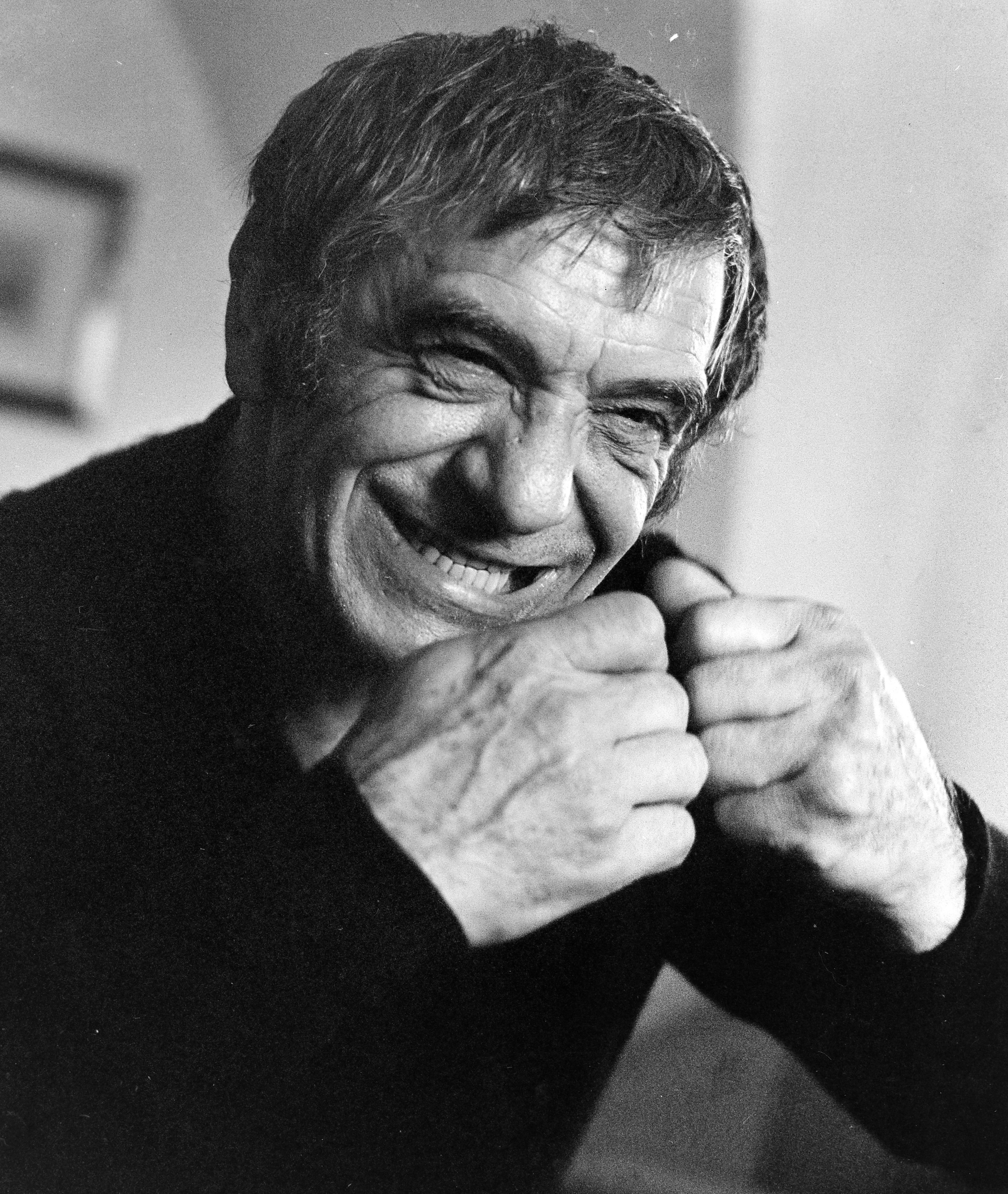
- Tot in 1969.
- Born: Imre Tóth; 27 September 1909; Fehérvárcsurgó, Austria-Hungary
- Died: 13 December 1984 (aged 75); Rome, Italy
- Occupations: Actor, sculptor
- Years active: 1967–1977

Amerigo Tot (born Imre Tóth; 27 September 1909 – 13 December 1984) was a Hungarian sculptor and occasional actor. Born in Fehérvárcsurgó, Austria-Hungary he moved to Rome towards the end of the 1920s, where he lived for the rest of his life. He studied in Budapest under Ferenc Helbing and György Leszkovszky from 1926 until 1928, and then at the Bauhaus in Germany. As the Nazis came to power he moved to Rome where he worked sculpting memorials on a grant from the Roman-Hungarian Academy, where he eventually became an advisor. He fought in the Italian resistance movement starting in 1943.

He first received international recognition for his work on the frieze in Roma Termini station in 1950. He began doing abstract works in the 1950s. He returned home to Hungary several times, including 1937, 1939 and 1969. In Hungary he was celebrated as a "world famous" artist and had major exhibitions. He created both traditional and abstract works, including a Madonna sculpture in his native Fehérvárcsurgó, as well as public monuments such as Microcosm in Macrocosm (a tribute to Béla Bartók), His Majesty and The Kilowatt in Kecskemét. The Amerigo Tot Museum in Pécs preserves a significant part of his oeuvre.

A permanent exhibition and memorial room dedicated to Amerigo Tot can also be found in the Koller Gallery in Budapest.

Amerigo Tot memorial room and permanent exhibition at the Koller Gallery, Budapest

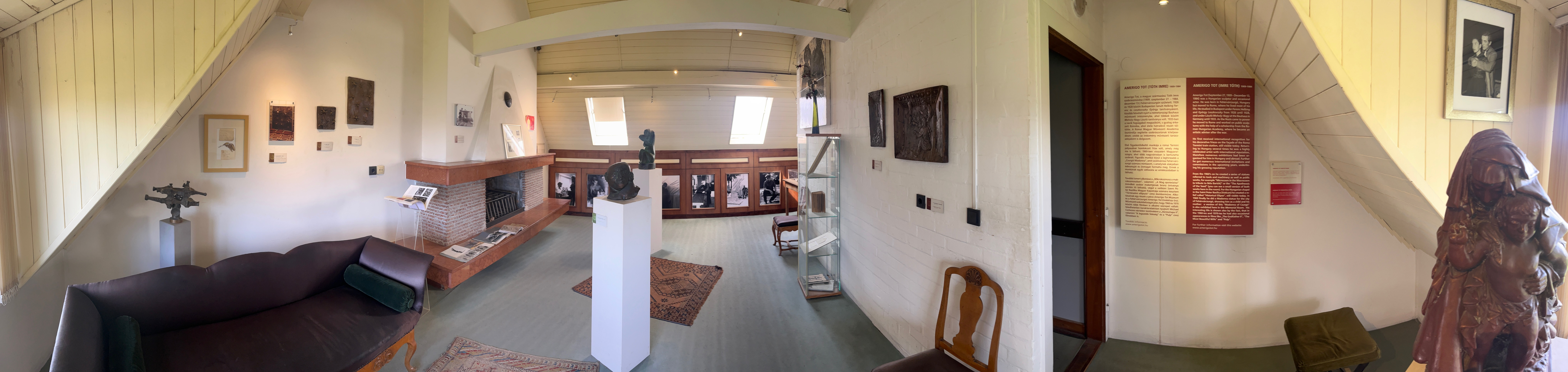
Permanent exhibition at the Koller Gallery

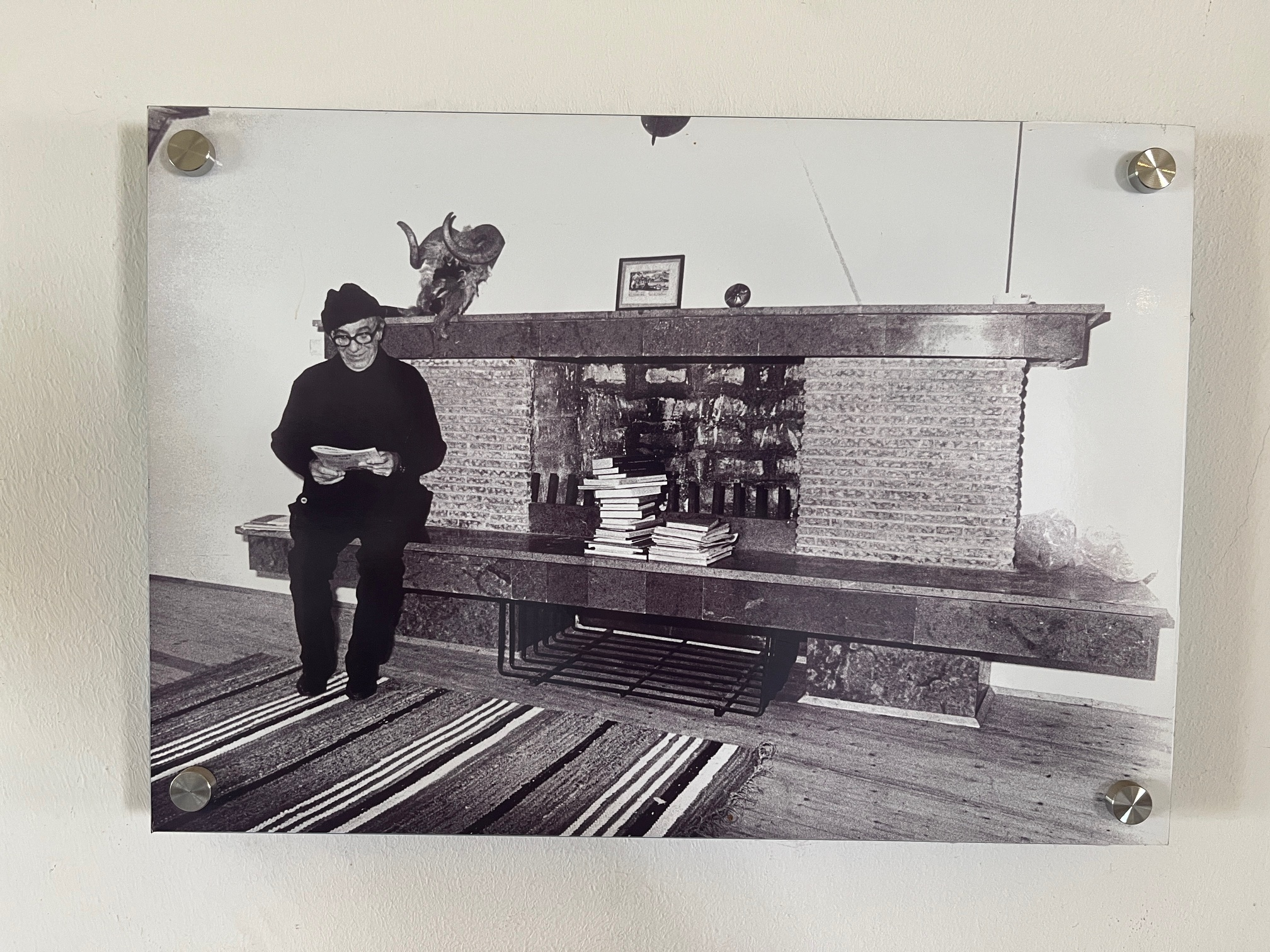
Memorial room at the Koller Gallery

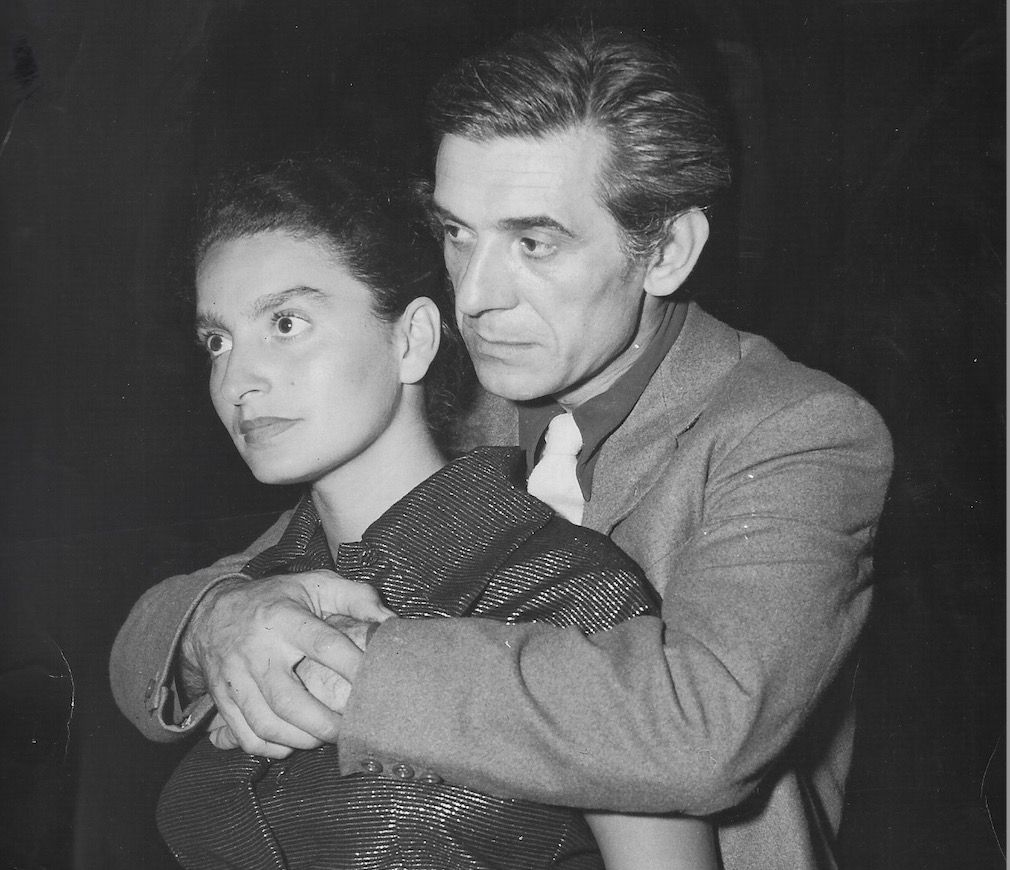
Éva Fischer and Amerigo Tot

In the 1960s and 1970s he made small appearances in films. He is perhaps best-known to English-speaking audiences for his role as Bussetta, Michael Corleone's bodyguard and executioner of Johnny Ola in The Godfather Part II. According to George S. Larke-Walsh, Tot's character in the film had to be brutal so that Michael's authority was retained. Tot also appeared in The Most Beautiful Wife and Pulp (1972). The latter was directed by Mike Hodges.

Tot died in Rome in 1984. He is interred in the Farkasréti Cemetery in Budapest.

== Filmography ==
Year	Title	Role	Notes
1968	Listen, Let's Make Love	Baron von Tummler	
1969	Satyricon	Lica - Trifena's husband	
1970	The Most Beautiful Wife	Antonino Stella	
1970	Lady Caliph	Industrialist	
1972	Pulp	Partisan	
1974	The Godfather Part II	Michael's Bodyguard	
1976	Cuore di cane	Il portiere	

== Sources ==
- Amerigo Tot’s Studio and Memorial Room – Koller Gallery
- Amerigo Tot at IMDb
