= Urlatori alla sbarra =

1960 film directed by Lucio Fulci

- Directed by: Lucio Fulci
- Written by: Giovanni Addessi; Lucio Fulci; Vittorio Vighi; Piero Vivarelli
- Produced by: Giovanni Addessi
- Starring: Joe Sentieri; Mina; Adriano Celentano; Elke Sommer; Chet Baker; Lino Banfi; Umberto Bindi
- Cinematography: Gianni Di Venanzo; Erico Menczer
- Edited by: Gabriele Varriale
- Music by: Piero Umiliani; Chet Baker
- Production company: Era Cinematografica
- Distributed by: Lux Film
- Release date: 23 March 1960 (Bari)
- Running time: 83 minutes
- Country: Italy
- Language: Italian
- Box office: ITL 268 million

Urlatori alla sbarra (lit. 'Howlers in the Dock') is a 1960 Italian musicarello film directed and co-written by Lucio Fulci.

== Plot ==
The film is a fast-paced musical comedy about a band of teddy boys and rock n' roll chicks, whose crazy, fun-loving habits inspire bitter complaints from their neighbors in the town. A prominent blue jeans company owner feels that the kids' poor reputation adversely affects his product's sales and public image. Prevailing upon the youths to help, he engineers a series of promotional stunts to lighten the public's opinion of these good-hearted rock n rollers and their lovely jeans. An unscrupulous politician makes things difficult for the youngsters, but everything turns out well.

== Cast ==
- Joe Sentieri as Joe Il Rosso
- Adriano Celentano as Adriano
- Mina Mazzini as Mina
- Elke Sommer as Giulia Giommarelli
- Chet Baker as Chet
- Mario Carotenuto as Professor Giommarelli
- Turi Pandolfini as Senator Bucci
- Giacomo Furia as On. Gubellini
- Marilù Tolo as Marilù
- Umberto Bindi as "Agonia"
- Corrado Lojacono as Corrado
- Gianni Meccia as "Satan"
- Gorni Kramer as Maestro Bremer
- Enzo Garinei as Carimei
- Sandro Giovannini as Giuseppeni
- Bruno Martino
- Lino Banfi as Leopoldo Cannavone
- I Brutos as a group of shepherds

== Development ==
Urlatori alla sbarra was developed by the Era Cinematografica who were based in Rome, Italy.

== Release ==
Urlatori alla sbarra was distributed by Lux Film in Rome with an 83 minute running time. It was first released in Bari on March 23, 1960, followed by Turin on April 21 and Rome on May 28, 1960. It grossed a total of 268 million Italian lire in Italy.

It is also known as Howlers of the Dock in some reference books.
