= Avenimiento =

Avenimiento (literally, "agreement" or "compromise") was a legal concept in the Argentine Penal Code, which stated that if a rape victim over the age of 16 agreed to marry her rapist, he could be freed from prison.

The concept of avenimiento was created as part of a 1998 overhaul of Argentinian laws related to sexual offences. Before 1998, this section of the law was called "Offences to Honesty": afterwards it was renamed "Offences to Sexual Integrity".

The concept has been widely criticized by international human rights organizations, and was removed from the penal code in March 2012, following a unanimous vote of 51 Argentinian senators.

== See also ==
- Marry-your-rapist law
