= Fuitina =

Italian term for elopement either consensual or due to marry-your-rapist law

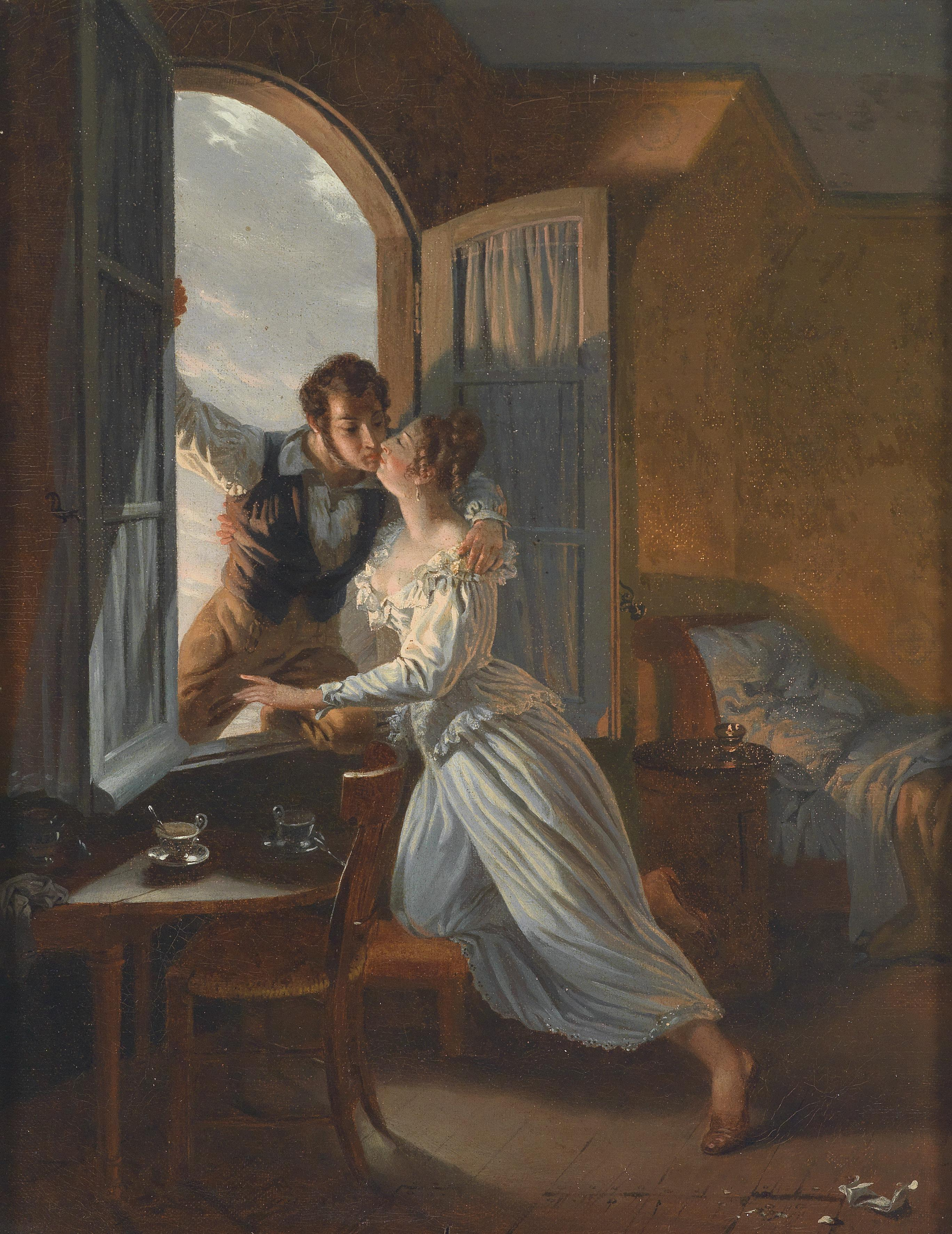
“Secret Meeting,” Jean Baptiste Lecoeur, (c. 1820)

The Sicilian term fuitina (literally: "sudden escape"; plural fuitini, Italian plural fuitine) refers to a practice that used to be common in Sicily and other areas of Southern Italy, whereby a young couple would elope in order to get married against the wishes of their families. The intent is that the prolonged absence of the fugitive couple would let their families presume that sexual intercourse had occurred and thus force them to consent to a so-called "rehabilitating wedding" (Italian: matrimonio riparatore). While elopements of young couples are reported to be widespread in places such as Palermo (over 300 have been reported to occur each year), most of them only bear a surface relationship with traditional fuitine, as they are not necessarily aimed at a rehabilitating marriage.

In principle, the term fuitina refers only to the consensual elopement of a couple, but the practice also lends itself to be appealed to in order to camouflage actual kidnapping, and possibly rape, of the bride-to-be.

A prominent example is the 1966 trial for rape where the lawyer of the kidnapper and rapist of Franca Viola maintained that the woman had actually consented to a fuitina. The trial had a wide resonance in Italy, as Franca Viola refused the "rehabilitating" marriage. The trial contributed to spread the awareness that because of the existing social ties (and specifically, the widespread notion that a woman who lost her virginity was not "worthy" to be married), women who suffered rape were often pressed to marry their rapists (especially, but not exclusively, if they got pregnant), or they would lose their honour and be marginalized by the society. The aftermath of her trial ruled that rapists were no longer able to avoid punishment through the marriage of their victims. In 1981, Italy repealed Article 544.

The Italian Criminal Code (art. 573) prosecutes (consensual) fuitina if the bride-to-be is a minor, equating it to the kidnapping of a consenting minor.
