= Yakamoto Kotzuga =

- Born: Giacomo Mazzucato; Venice
- Genres: Electronic; soundtrack
- Years active: 2013–present
- Label: Sugar

Giacomo Mazzucato (born 10 January 1994), known by his stage name Yakamoto Kotzuga, is an Italian musician, composer and record producer.

== Biography ==
Mazzucato studied at the Conservatorium of Venice.

He began his career in 2013, releasing the EPs Rooms of Emptiness (Bad Panda Records) and Lost Keys & Stolen Kisses (Highlife Recordings). He produced music for rappers Ghemon and Mecna, and his track “Your Smell” was used in a Vogue report at Paris Fashion Week.

In 2014 he published the single All These Things I Used To Have and was awarded an artistic residency at Fabrica, the Benetton Group's communication research center, where he worked as a composer and sound designer on documentaries, installations and commercial projects.

In 2015, he signed a publishing deal with Sugar Music and released his debut album, Usually Nowhere, through La Tempesta International/Sugar. He performed alongside artists including Forest Swords, Tycho, Plaid, Lone, Jhon Talabot, and Legowelt.

He also released the single "Futile," used as the soundtrack for an early Italian 360° virtual-reality video project produced by Cattleya, and created the set for designer Chiara Boni's New York Fashion Week show.

In 2016, he released the single "T.H.R.U."
