= Deuteronomy 22 =

Biblical book of Deuteronomy, chapter 22

- ← chapter 21 chapter 23 →
- Book of Deuteronomy in the Damascus Torah Codex (Keter Dammeseq) from 10th century
- Book: Book of Deuteronomy
- Hebrew Bible part: Torah
- Order in the Hebrew part: 5
- Category: Torah
- Christian Bible part: Old Testament
- Order in the Christian part: 5

Deuteronomy 22 is the twenty-second chapter of the Book of Deuteronomy in the Hebrew Bible or the Old Testament of the Christian Bible. The book is one of the Books of the Torah. This chapter contains regulations concerning theft of property, protection of life, manners, and violence in sexual relations.

== Text ==
The original text of this chapter is written in the Hebrew language. This chapter is divided into 30 verses in English Bibles, but 29 verses in the Masoretic Text with the verse 30 in English Bibles numbered as 23:1.

=== Textual witnesses ===
Some early manuscripts containing the text of this chapter in Hebrew are of the Masoretic Text tradition, which includes the Aleppo Codex (10th century) and Codex Leningradensis (1008). Some fragments containing parts of this chapter were found among the Dead Sea Scrolls, including: 4Q36 (4QDeut^{i}; 100–75 BCE) with extant verses 1–9; 4Q45 (4QpaleoDeut^{r}; 100–25 BCE) with extant verses 3–6; and 4Q33 (4QDeut^{f}; 75–50 BCE) with extant verses 12–19.

There is also a translation into Koine Greek known as the Septuagint, made in the last few centuries BC. Extant ancient manuscripts of the Septuagint version include Codex Vaticanus (B; $\mathfrak{G}$^{B}; 4th century), and Codex Alexandrinus (A; $\mathfrak{G}$^{A}; 5th century).

== Fairness and co-operation (22:1–4) ==
This part of the law distinguishes 'lost property' from 'theft', forbids 'ignoring (Hebrew: hit'allem) obvious cases for mutual help', with the aim to overcome 'indifference and irresponsibility' (cf. Exodus 23:4–5).

== Ordinances protecting life and manners (22:5–12) ==
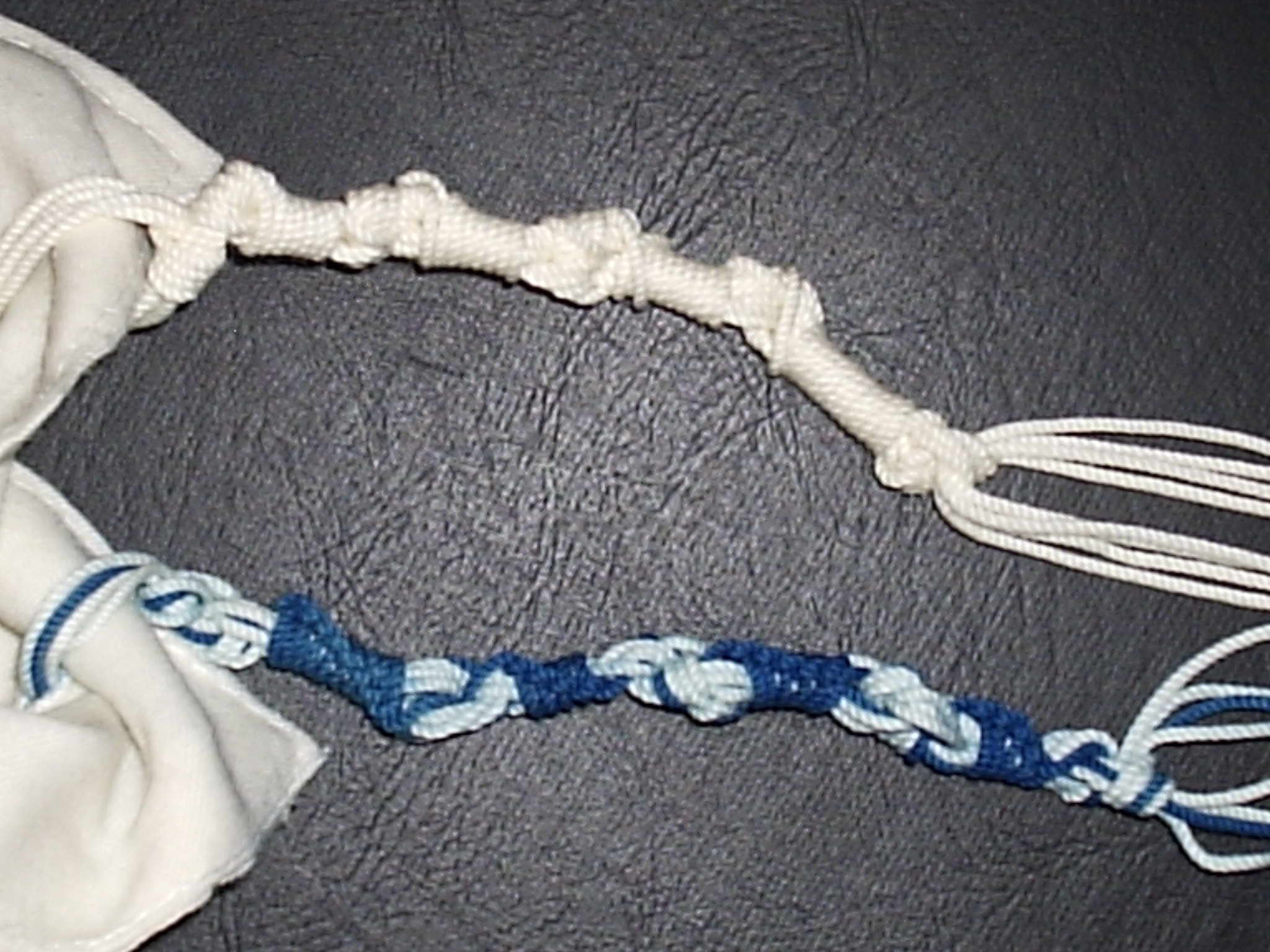
Blue and white tzitzit knotted in the Sephardi style, the all white is Ashkenazi.

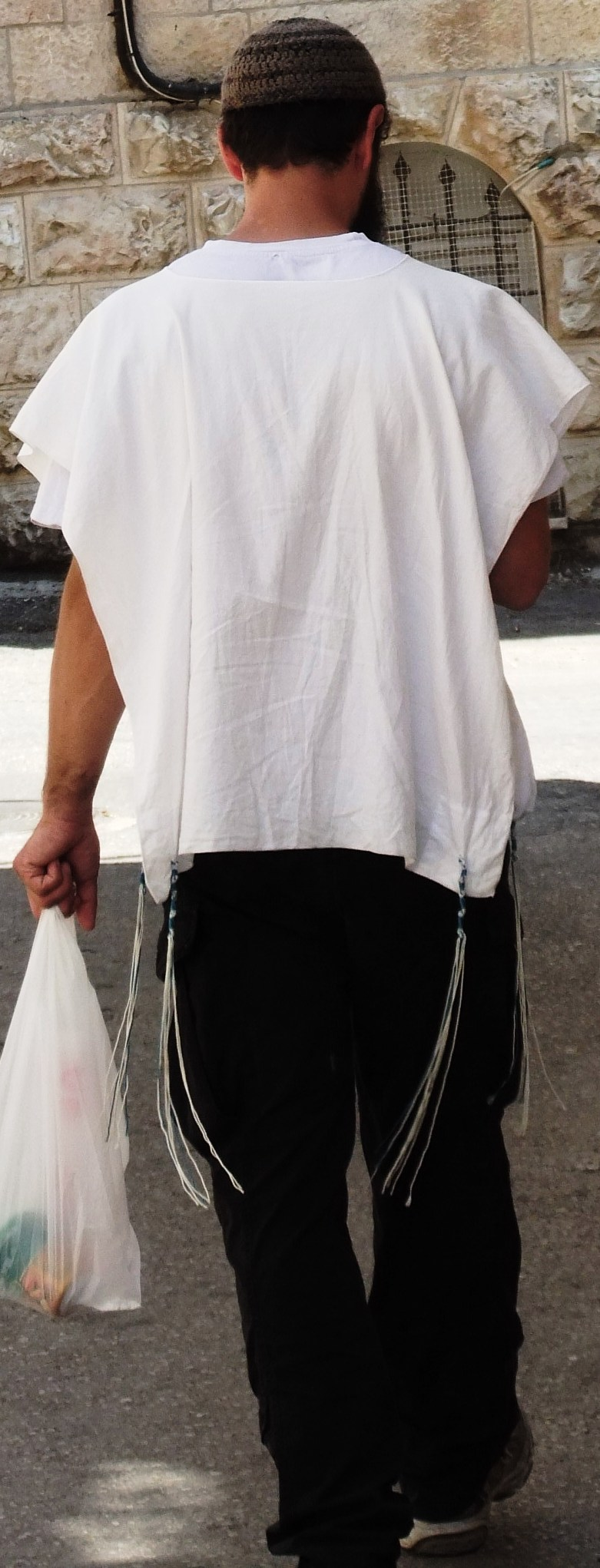
Man walking with Tzizit in Nachlaot, Jerusalem

Notably in verses 5 and 9–12, this section of the law focuses on certain actions that are 'abominable' to Yahweh, in particular also to restrict 'human greed and power over animal life' (verses 6–7).

=== Verse 5 ===
A woman must not put on man’s apparel, nor shall a man wear woman’s clothing; for whoever does these things is abhorrent to your God יהוה.

==== Hebrew Bible ====
ה לֹא-יִהְיֶה כְלִי-גֶבֶר עַל-אִשָּׁה, וְלֹא-יִלְבַּשׁ גֶּבֶר שִׂמְלַת אִשָּׁה: כִּי תוֹעֲבַת יְהוָה אֱלֹהֶיךָ, כָּל-עֹשֵׂה אֵלֶּה. {פ}

This verse is the biblical foundation for the Jewish prohibition of cross-dressing, referred to as lo yibash. Jewish scholars, historical and contemporary authorities, and leaders hold different opinions on correctly interpreting and implementing the commandment found in Deuteronomy 22:5. Some argue the act of cross-dressing is an abomination. Others maintain cross-dressing is only a manifestation of a different ill intention, such as deception, idolatry, or sexual promiscuity.

=== Verse 12 ===
You shall make yourself tassels on the four corners of your garment with which you cover yourself.

==== Hebrew Bible ====
גדלים תעשה לך על ארבע כנפות כסותך אשר תכסה בה׃

The tassels or fringes worn in antiquity by Israelites and today by observant Jews and Samaritans are called Tzitzit, to be attached to the four corners of the tallit gadol, (prayer shawl) usually referred to simply as a tallit or tallis; and tallit katan (everyday undergarment). This command repeats the previously stated law in Numbers 15:37–41. The Talmud equates observance of tzitzit with that of all the mitzvot.

== Family and sex laws (22:13–30) ==
A portion of the more elaborate collection of sex laws, this part looks into the "dishonesty and violence in the sexual relations".

Deuteronomy 22:13–21 deals with situations in which a woman is accused by her husband of having been a non-virginal bride. No witnesses or positive evidence of wrongdoing are required for her to be stoned to death as a consequence of this; rather, it is up to her parents to prove that she was a virgin by presenting the tokens of her virginity.

The location of the stoning differs from what is specified in 17:5 (for offering blemished sacrifices), 21:21 (for being a stubborn and rebellious son), and 22:24 (for being raped in the city and not crying out), in that the woman is to be stoned at the door of her father's house, associating her family with her transgression.

Verse 30 specifically forbids a son to marry any of his father's former wives.

== See also ==
- Marry-your-rapist law
- Rape in the Bible

== Sources ==
- Bultmann, Christoph (2007). "8. Deuteronomy". In Barton, John; Muddiman, John (eds.). The Oxford Bible Commentary (first (paperback) ed.). Oxford University Press. pp. 135–158. ISBN 978-0199277186.
- Fitzmyer, Joseph A. (2008). A Guide to the Dead Sea Scrolls and Related Literature. Grand Rapids, Michigan: William B. Eerdmans. ISBN 9780802862419.
- Ulrich, Eugene, ed. (2010). The Biblical Qumran Scrolls: Transcriptions and Textual Variants. Brill. ISBN 9789004181830.
- Würthwein, Ernst (1995). The Text of the Old Testament. Translated by Rhodes, Erroll F. Grand Rapids, Michigan: William B. Eerdmans. ISBN 978-0-8028-0788-5.
