= Raptus =

Latin legal term

Raptus is the Latin for 'seized', from rapere 'to seize'. In Roman law the term covered many crimes of property, and women were considered property.

It may refer to:

- any literal seizure
  - confiscation
  - robbery
  - kidnapping
  - raptio, i.e. the abduction of women, also known as Frauenraub; these are the "rapes of Zeus".
  - the term for bride kidnapping in Catholic canon law
  - rape in medieval English law
- medical
  - seizure
  - epileptic seizure
  - stroke
  - convulsion
  - focal seizure
- in religion, spirituality and subjective experience
  - rapture, a Protestant belief about the End Times and the transport of redeemed souls
  - status raptus, religious ecstasy
  - being "carried away" or "transported", being in good spirits, see Ecstasy (emotion)
  - out-of-body experience

== See also ==
- Rape
- History of rape
- Raptor, certain birds of prey and dinosaurs, and the human creations named after them (military equipment, sporting teams, etc.)
- the artistic and poetic concept of the sublime, especially in Romantic texts, inspired rapture.
  - the literary critic Longinus and his essay "On the Sublime".
- the protagonist in Dario Fo's play Accidental Death of an Anarchist died in raptus.
