= Maria Rosa Cutrufelli =

Italian writer

- Born: 1946 (age 79–80); Messina, Italy
- Occupation: Writer

Maria Rosa Cutrufelli (born Messina, 1946) is an Italian writer and journalist.

== Biography ==
Born in Messina and raised between Sicily and Florence, she studied in Bologna and decided to live in Rome. She graduated in literature from the University of Bologna with a thesis on the structure of the novel (mentored by Luciano Anceschi). Roberto Roversi and Italo Calvino gave her advice after reading her thesis. After her university studies, she collaborated with various critical and literary magazines. She founded, and directed for twelve years, Tuttestorie, a magazine centered around "racconti, letture, trame di donne". She edited some story anthologies and wrote radio dramas for RAI; among them, Lontano da casa was published in book form by Rai Libri in 1997. In 1984 in Rome, she thought up and organized the first exhibition of books with female authors and taught "Teoria e pratica della scrittura creativa" at Sapienza University of Rome.

Her books have been translated into about twenty languages.

Cutrufelli is active in the feminist movement and has always been attentive to problems concerning the female condition. In the seventies she wrote various texts on the issue of work, women's emancipation, and a study on the question of pornography and prostitution. She chose women's point of view because it is that of "anche nella propria terra, anche nella propria casa, può sentirsi in esilio, straniera e nemica, sperimentando in questo modo direttamente – e a volte duramente – la necessità del cambiamento, di una frattura culturale, di un dialogo con le altre".

“Even in her own land, in her own house, she can feel exiled, a stranger and enemy, directly experiencing in this way – and sometimes severely – the necessity for change, of a cultural divide, of dialogue with other women".

Aware of the impacts of word choice and language traps, Cutrufelli doesn't love the definition "letteratura femminile" and prefers to speak of writing "firma femminile" to not hide "il sesso dell'autore o dell'autrice dietro una presunta neutralità della scrittura, pur rifiutando di essere catalogata secondo impropri criteri di genere sessuale." / "the sex of the author or of the authoress behind a presumed neutrality of writing, while refusing to be catalogued according to incorrect criteria of sex.”

“‘Letteratura femminile’ è infatti una categoria che raggruppava (e continua a raggruppare) in un'unica ombra, compatta e indistinta, tutte le opere prodotte dalle donne e che ha storicamente assunto una connotazione limitata e limitante, quasi un genere letterario a parte e minore, caratterizzato da un'attenzione pressoché esclusiva ai sentimenti."

“‘Women’s literature’ is surely a category that gathers together (and continues to gather together) in a single shadow, solid and indistinct, all the works produced by women and that has historically taken on a limited and limiting connotation, almost a genre of literature set apart and minored, nearly characterized by an attention reserved for emotions.”

Many of the plots of Cutrufelli’s books were born from her numerous travels and meetings with women from all over the world; from "libri d’esperienza" that re-evoke moments from her biographies (Mama Africa, Giorni d’acqua corrente) to novels that often elaborate further on the stories of women from the past, as in the case of La donna che visse per un sogno. This book explores the last four months of the life of Marie Olympe de Gouges, a feminist during the time of the French Revolution.

With D’amore e d’odio she narrates the twentieth century through the lives of seven women tied to each other through a series of personal events, choosing a structure built on monologues of minor characters that illustrate the protagonists in the various stories. An original interpretation that, like in the case of Olympe de Gouges, unveils what Cutrufelli calls "molestie storiche"; that is, the legacy of misogyny that women who disturb (or even subvert) the traditional order carry behind them. If it is true that, as Cutrufelli writes (citing Zambrano) "le radici devono avere fiducia nei fiori" / "the roots need to have faith in the flowers"; it is a way of rereading the past with the hope that the future brings transformation.

With Il giudice delle donne we return to the beginning of the twentieth century, to Montemarciano, a country in the province of Ancona that looks over the Adriatic Sea. Ten teachers, commanded by the wife of the Socialist mayor, Luisa, welcome Maria Montessori’s appeal to ask for women's suffrage.

== Works ==
=== Novels ===
- La briganta, Palermo, La luna, 1990. ISBN 88-7823-026-X; Milan, Frassinelli, 2005. ISBN 88-8274-834-0.
- Complice il dubbio, Milan, Interno giallo, 1992. ISBN 88-356-0147-9; Milano, Frassinelli, 2006. ISBN 88-7684-899-1 (the film ‘’Le complici’’ by Emanuela Piovano was based on this novel)
- Canto al deserto. Storia di Tina, soldato di mafia, Milan, Longanesi, 1994. ISBN 88-304-1238-4.
- Il paese dei figli perduti, Milan, Tropea, 1999. ISBN 88-438-0205-4.
- La donna che visse per un sogno, Milan, Frassinelli, 2004. ISBN 88-7684-777-4. [came in fifth for the Strega Prize, Penne prize, Alghero Donna Prize (narrative section), Premio letterario Racalmare Leonardo Sciascia]
- D'amore e d'odio, Milan, Frassinelli, 2008. ISBN 978-88-7684-998-5. [won the Tassoni prize]
- I bambini della Ginestra, Milan, Frassinelli, 2012. ISBN 978-88-200-5203-4. [won the Ultima Frontiera prize]
- Il giudice delle donne, Milan, Frassinelli, 2016. ISBN 978-88-88320-90-8 [won the Lucca-Società dei Lettori prize]

=== Travel books ===
- Mama Africa. [Storia di donne e di utopie], Milan, Sipiel, 1989. ISBN 88-380-0094-8; Milano, Feltrinelli, 1993. ISBN 88-07-81238-X.
- Le cinque spine, Milan, La Tartaruga, 1997. ISBN 88-7738-251-1.
- Giorni d'acqua corrente, Milan, Pratiche, 2002. ISBN 88-7380-739-9.
- Ricordi d'Africa, San Cesario di Lecce, Manni, 2009. ISBN 978-88-6266-110-2.

=== Children's books ===
- Terrona, Troina, Città aperta junior, 2004. ISBN 88-8137-148-0.

=== Essays ===
- L'Unità d'Italia. Guerra contadina e nascita del sottosviluppo del Sud, Verona, Bertani, 1974.
- L'invenzione della donna. Miti e tecniche di uno sfruttamento, Milano, Mazzotta, 1974.
- Disoccupata con onore. Lavoro e condizione della donna, Milan, Mazzotta, 1975.
- Donna perché piangi? Imperialismo e condizione femminile nell'Africa nera, Milan, Mazzotta, 1976.
- Operaie senza fabbrica. Inchiesta sul lavoro a domicilio, Rome, Editori Riuniti, 1977.
- Le donne protagoniste nel movimento cooperativo. La questione femminile in un'organizzazione produttiva democratica, edited by, Milan, Feltrinelli economica, 1978.
- Economia e politica dei sentimenti. La "produzione femminile", Rome, Editori Riuniti, 1980.
- Il cliente. Inchiesta sulla domanda di prostituzione, Rome, Editori Riuniti, 1981.
- La forza delle donne nel movimento cooperativo. Qualità sociale, imprenditorialità, forme organizzative, edited by and with Marta Nicolini, Rome, Editrice cooperativa, 1987.
- Scritture, scrittrici. Almanacco, edited by, Milan, Coop-Longanesi, 1988. ISBN 88-380-0082-4.
- Piccole italiane. Un raggiro durato vent'anni, edited by and with Elena Doni, it:Elena Gianini Belotti, it:Laura Lilli, Dacia Maraini, Cristiana di San Marzano, it:Mirella Serri e it:Chiara Valentini, Milan, Anabasi, 1994. ISBN 88-417-7029-5.
- Il denaro in corpo, Milan, Tropea, 1996. ISBN 88-438-0018-3.
- Il Novecento delle italiane. Una storia ancora da raccontare, with Elena Doni, Paola Gaglianone, Elena Gianini Belotti, Rossella Lama, it:Lia Levi, Laura Lilli, Dacia Maraini, it:Carla Ravaioli, Loredana Rotondo, Marina Saba, Cristiana di San Marzano, Mirella Serri, Simona Tagliaventi, Gabriella Turnaturi e Chiara Valentini, Roma, Editori Riuniti, 2001. ISBN 88-359-4919-X.
- Scrivere con l'inchiostro bianco, Rome, Jacobelli, 2018

=== Anthologies ===
- Quella febbre sotto le parole, edit. Iacobelli, Rome 2016, ISBN 88-625-23-211
- Il pozzo segreto. Cinquanta scrittrici italiane, presented by and with Rosaria Guacci and it:Marisa Rusconi, Florence, Giunti, 1993. ISBN 88-09-20294-5.
- Nella città proibita, edited by, Milan, Tropea, 1997. ISBN 88-438-0104-X; Milan, Net, 2003. ISBN 88-515-2087-9.

=== Short stories ===
Cutrufelli's stories are present in many magazines and in Italian and foreign anthologies.

- Doppie passioni, in La guerra, il cuore e la parola, Siracusa, Ombra editrice, 1991
- Madonna Gasparina, in 16 racconti italiani, Brescia, Libreria Rinascita editrice, 1994
- Balsamo di tigre, in Horror erotico, Viterbo, Stampa alternativa, 1995. ISBN 88-7226-253-4.
- Lontano da casa. Radiodramma, Rome, RAI-ERI, 1997. ISBN 88-397-0979-7.
- Regalo di nozze in Principesse Azzurre. Racconti d'amore e di vita di donne tra donne, Milan, Oscar Mondadori, 2003. ISBN 88-04-51654-2.
- Northern Hills in After the war. A collection of short fiction by postwar Italian women, New York, Italica Press, 2004.
- Silenzi e segreti in Principesse Azzurre 2. Racconti d'amore e di vita di donne tra donne, Milan, Oscar Mondadori, 2004. ISBN 88-04-52903-2.
- La regina delle nevi in Principesse Azzurre 3. Racconti d'amore e di vita di donne tra donne, Milan, Mondadori, 2005. ISBN 88-04-54728-6.
- I giardini dietro casa in Eros up! Principesse azzurre in amore, Milan, Mondadori, 2008. ISBN 978-88-04-57776-8.
- Io c'ero in Per sempre ragazzo. Racconti e poesie a dieci anni dall'uccisione di Carlo Giuliani, Milan, Tropea, 2011. ISBN 978-88-558-0187-4.
- Fuoco a Manhattan, in Lavoro vivo, Rome, edit. Alegre, 2012
- La cosacca, in Mappe sulla pelle, Florence, editpress, 2012
- Erano i giorni migliori, erano i giorni peggiori, in Scritto nella memoria (edited by Marco Vichi), ed. Guanda 2016

=== Bibliographic references ===
- Tracce a margine. Scritture a firma femminile nella narrativa storica siciliana contemporanea, Serena Todesco, Pungitopo edit., Patti (Messina), 2017
- Riscrivere la Storia con l'occhio di un bambino: soggettività e trauma ne I bambini della Ginestra, Serena Todesco, in S. Magni (ed. by), La Réécriture de l'histoire dans les romans de la postmodernité, Aix-en-Provence: Presses Universitaires de Provence, 2015
- La storia al femminile: Maria Rosa Cutrufelli, Maria Chiara Tropea, Università di Catania, Tesi di laurea, 2012–2013
- L'invisibile linea del colore nel femminismo italiano, Liliana Ellena, in Genesis, ed.Viella, X/2, 2011
- Enciclopedia delle donne, testo on-line a cura di Serena Todesco
- Scrittrici siciliane del novecento, Donatella La Monaca, Flaccovio edit., Palermo, 2008
- Entre texte et contexte: pour un parcours de la littérature féminin des iles italiennes, Margherita Marras, Université d'Avignon, 2006
- Politica, femminilità e meridionalità nella scrittura di Maria Rosa Cutrufelli, Valentina Recchia, Università di Catania, Tesi di laurea, 2006
- Travesties of Risorgimento in Maria Rosa Cutrufelli's La Briganta, Cinzia Di Giulio, Dickinson University Press, 2005
- Introduzione alla lettura di Maria Rosa Cutrufelli, Donatella La Monaca, in "Lo specchio di carta", 2005.
- Scrittrici italiane dell'ultimo Novecento (edited by Neria De Giovanni), Commissione nazionale per le pari opportunità, Roma, 2003
- Mobility and Subjectivity in Maria Rosa Cutrufelli's Il paese dei figli perduti, Ita MacCarthy, in Cross-Cultural Travel: Papers from the Royal Irish Academy Symposium on Literature and Travel edited (edited by Jane Conroy), Peter Lang, New York, 2003
- A Myth Reclaimed, Angela Jannet, in Italian women and the city, Dickinson University Press, 2003
- Sicilian Lives at the Crossroads: Reading Maria Rosa Cutrufelli, Edvige Giunta, in "Academic Forum 10", 2002
- Stranger Than Life? Autobiography and Historical Fiction, Carol Lazzaro-Weis, University of Pennsylvania Press, 1999
- Maria Rosa Cutrufelli e il suo punto di vista sulla sessualità femminile, Giulia Sanguinat Kranz, in Cultura e società alla fine del secondo millennio, Elte, Budapest, 1999
- Il cenacolo degli specchi. Narrativa italiana 1993–1995, Giuseppe Amoruso, Sciascia editore, Caltanissetta, 1997
- Nota bio-bibliografica a cura di Edvige Giunta in Feminist writers, Pamela Kester Shelton, St. James Press, 1996
- The impossible return: women, violence and exile, in "Voices in Italian Americana 2", 1996
- Scrivere una storia, riscrivere la storia, Silvia Contarini, in “Narrativa” nº 10, 1996
- History, Fiction and the Female Autobiographical Voice, Carol Lazzaro-Weis in “Romance Languages Annual 7”, 1995
- Re-thinking History: Women's Transgression in Maria Rosa Cutrufelli, Monica Rossi, Dickinson University Press, 1993
- From Margin to Mainstream, Carol Lazzaro-Weis, University of Pennsylvania Press, 1993
- Between Document and Fiction: Maria Rosa Cutrufelli's Voices, Angela Jeannet, Italian Culture, XVI, 1/1998
