= Marry-your-rapist law =

Law that exonerates a male rapist if he marries his female victim

A marry-your-rapist law, marry-the-rapist law, or rape-marriage law is a rule of rape law in a jurisdiction under which a man who commits rape, sexual assault, statutory rape, abduction or other similar act is exonerated if he marries his female victim, or in some jurisdictions at least offers to marry her. The "marry-your-rapist" law is a legal way for the accused to avoid prosecution or punishment.

Although the terms for this phenomenon were only coined in the 2010s, (Note: Attributed to multiple sources:) the practice has existed in a number of legal systems in history, and continues to exist in some societies today in various forms. Such laws were common around the world until the 1970s. Since the late 20th century, the remaining laws of this type have been increasingly challenged and repealed in a number of countries. Laws that allow courts to authorise an underage marriage on account of the pregnancy of a female minor when she is below the age of consent, commonly with parental consent, can in practice be a way for a statutory rapist to avoid prosecution for the statutory rape of a child.

The law has been justified as recognition of the cultural value placed upon female virginity at marriage, in which "despoiled girls and women are a source of shame for their families, innocent of wrongdoing though they may be." In some cases, the perpetrator rapes the girl or woman whom he wants to marry after she previously rejected him.

== Background ==
The overwhelming majority of countries in the world do not have these laws, and, as of 2021, only 20 were believed to still have them.

Many activists and organisations believe that these laws violate the dignity of women and degrade them by allowing them to be traded as possessions between families, imply that rape is not a serious crime, and blame the victim and not the perpetrator. The UN Human Rights Chief, Zeid Ra’ad Al Hussein, said in 2017 that "[punishing] a rape victim by making her marry the perpetrator of a horrible crime against her – there is no place in today’s world for such hideous laws".

Furthermore, those who are against rape-marriage laws do not think victims should be left feeling this way after they have suffered an attack, or feel the need to cover up the assault by marrying the perpetrator. Opponents claim the laws promote impunity for rape, and further victimize rape victims. Thus, the social value of women, as proponents assign to family honour, female chastity and marital status, clashes with opponents' claim of women's right to individual happiness, freedom and sexual autonomy. According to Purna Sen, the policy director for UN Women, these laws were passed to normalise the unlawful sexual activities. They make the sexual relations more respectable in the society because it is considered problematic in a few cultures. Countries who have these laws fall under the category of undeveloped countries and conservative countries.

Mental health problems including PTSD, anxiety disorders, rape trauma syndrome, and depressive disorders are common in rape victims. A Taiwanese study showed that victims feared being vocal about their assault, felt guilty for shaming their families, experienced sexual shame and self blame, and developed negative views of themselves as women.

Advocates for rape-marriage laws argue that they shield the victim and her family from the shame of rape. This is based on the idea that if a girl or woman is raped, it is her own fault and she thus brings her family into disrepute. As a result, many women do not report their sexual assault because they fear this shame, and the possibility of being murdered by a family member. If a woman simply marries her rapist, she preserves her family name and avoids a life of sexual shame. This view exists despite much evidence existing that blaming the victim leads to shame, ridicule, and unnecessary psychological distress.

== History ==
=== Antiquity ===
Traditionally, the marriage of the perpetrator and the victim after the rape was often seen as an appropriate "resolution" of the situation. Among ancient cultures virginity was highly prized, and a woman who had been raped had little chance of marrying. These laws forced the rapist to provide for their victim.

==== Code of Hammurabi and Middle Assyrian Laws ====
The Code of Hammurabi was composed around 1750 BCE (middle chronology), supposedly by king Hammurabi of the First Babylonian Empire. In Hammurabi §156, a woman is engaged to a man, but the man's father has sex with her before they get married. This scenario does not make clear whether the woman consented to having sex with her fiancé's father, and the woman gets to choose which man she marries, so whether or not this is a rape law is contested:

156. If a seignior chose a bride for his son and his son did not have intercourse with her, but he himself has lain in her bosom, he shall pay to her one-half mina of silver and he shall make good to her whatever she brought from her father's house in order that the man of her choice may marry her. (Pritchard, Ancient Near Eastern Texts Relating to the Old Testament (1969), p. 172.)

The Middle Assyrian Laws (MAL) were developed between 1450 and 1250 BCE in the Middle Assyrian Empire. The 55th law, MAL 55, stipulated that if a man "took by force and ravished" a young virgin woman who was not married or pledged or asked to be married and living in her father's house, the virgin's father would be allowed to 'ravish' the perpetrator's wife in retaliation and take her as an extra wife. If the perpetrator had no wife, the father could marry his daughter off to the perpetrator for "the (extra) third in silver ... as the value of a virgin", or to another man of the father's choosing for the same price.

55. In the case of a seignior's daughter, a virgin who was living in her father's house, whose [father] had not been asked (for her in marriage), whose hymen had not been opened since she was not married, and no one had a claim against her father's house, if a seignior took the virgin by force and ravished her, either in the midst of the city or in the open country or at night in the street or in a granary or at a city festival, the father of the virgin shall take the wife of the virgin's ravisher and give her to be ravished; he shall not return her to her husband (but) take her; the father may give his daughter who was ravished to her ravisher in marriage. If he has no wife, the ravisher shall give the (extra) third in silver to her father as the value of a virgin (and) her ravisher shall marry her (and) not cast her off. If the father does not (so) wish, he shall receive the (extra) third for the virgin in silver (and) give his daughter to whom he wishes. (Pritchard, Ancient Near Eastern Texts Relating to the Old Testament (1969), p. 185.)

Susanne Scholz (2021) noted the similarities between Hammurabi §156, MAL 55, and the Hebrew Bible's Deuteronomy 22:28–29 (composed in the 7th century BCE): in each case, the punishment is financial compensation (in MAL 55 and Deut 22 to the woman's father, in Hammurabi §156 to the woman herself), and the no-longer-virgin woman must to be married off to the perpetrator or another man (in Hammurabi §156, the woman can choose which man she wants to marry; in MAL 55, her father decides; in Deut 22, she must marry the perpetrator).

==== Hebrew Bible ====
A marry-your-rapist provision is believed by some to be found in the Hebrew Bible, Deuteronomy 22:28–29, which according to the New International Version reads:

²⁸ If a man happens to meet a virgin who is not pledged to be married and rapes [תָּפַשׂ tāfaś][שָׁכַב šākhab] her and they are discovered, ²⁹ he shall pay her father fifty shekels of silver. He must marry the young woman, for he has violated [עָנָהׂ anah/inah] her. He can never divorce her as long as he lives.

Bible translations interpret the passage differently, with many modern editions translating the term שָׁכַב šākhab as "to rape", where older translations usually preferred "to lie (with)". Similarly, most modern translations render תָּפַשׂ tāfaś as "to seize", whereas older translations generally preferred "to lay hold on". Finally, עָנָה anah/inah is almost universally translated as "to humble" in older English translations, but almost always as "to violate" in modern translations. The Good News Translation even renders the passage as "he forced her to have intercourse with him", and God's Word Translation makes it "he raped her". Irrespective of whether or not the woman had given consent to the sexual act, or will give consent to marriage, the man is required to marry her by paying her parents a dowry to settle the matter.

Rabbi Zev Farber places the law in its agrarian ancient Near-Eastern patriarchal context, and notes Rabbinic commentators already acknowledged that many of the laws in the Torah are problematic. They instead viewed them as applicable only to specific historical periods, with reinterpretations for their own mercantile societies.

Some Christians believe that the command in Deuteronomy 22:28 does not refer to rape, but to a man enticing a woman to engage in consensual intercourse, as in the passage in Exodus 22:16–17, which also explicitly states the father's right to confirm or refuse the marriage. The Hebrew sometimes rendered as "rapes" here is the verb שָׁכַב šākab, which literally means "to lie (down)" or "to sleep"; it is sometimes used as a euphemism for "to lie/sleep (with someone)", and when the context adds force, it can mean "to rape", for example in Genesis 35:22 or 2 Samuel 13:14. Adjacent scriptures that speak of forced sexual relations with engaged (versus unengaged) virgins prescribe the death penalty for rapists (Deuteronomy 22:23–27). As apologist Kyle Butte argues, "It is clearly evident from the immediate context of Deuteronomy 22 that rape is not being discussed in verses 28–29 ... verses 25–27 give a clear instance in which rape is being discussed. ... The text says that the man who committed the crime 'shall die' (v. 25)". But not all Christian scholars agree that Deuteronomy 22:28–29 is mere consensual fornication. Eugene H. Merrill (1994) pointed out: "At first glance, the next example, the rape of an unbetrothed girl, might appear to have been a lesser offense than those already described, but this was not the case at all. First, he seized (Heb. ׂtāpaś, 'lay hold of') her and then lay down (šākab) with her, a clear case of violent, coercive behavior."

Although commentators such as John Gill (1746–1763) and Charles Ellicott (1897) who think Deuteronomy 22:28–29 describes consensual sex often compare it to Exodus 22:16–17 (which almost all scholars agree is a consensual situation), the latter does not specify that the man "violated" her, whereas Deuteronomy 22:29 does. The Hebrew word used here for "violated" is עָנָה anah (or inah), which (depending on the context) can mean "to rape, to force [sexually], to defile, to violate, to ravish, to mistreat, to afflict, to humble/humiliate, to oppress, to subject/submit/subdue, to weaken". Especially when a Hebrew verb is in the pi'el (intensifying) form, this adds force, and in Deuteronomy 22:29 עִנָּ֔הּ ‘in-nāh is in the pi'el. In several other cases in the Hebrew Bible where this word is used to describe a man and a woman interacting, it is usually describing a man forcing a woman to have sex against her will (i.e., rape). (Note: Other examples of עָנָה anah/inah describing a man and a woman interacting: "Later, if you no longer want her, you are to let her go free. Since you forced her to have intercourse [Hebrew: anah] with you, you cannot treat her as a slave and sell her." (Deuteronomy 21:14); "If you mistreat [Hebrew: anah] my daughters, or if you take wives besides my daughters, although no man is with us, see, God is witness between you and me." (Genesis 31:50 NAU); "But the men of Gibeah rose up against me and surrounded the house at night because of me. They intended to kill me; instead, they ravished [Hebrew: anah] my concubine so that she died." (Judges 20:5 NAS); "However, he would not listen to her; since he was stronger than she, he violated [Hebrew: anah] her and lay [Hebrew: šākab] with her." (2 Samuel 13:14 NAS); "Jonadab, the son of Shimeah, David's brother, responded, "Do not let my lord suppose they have put to death all the young men, the king's sons, for Amnon alone is dead; because by the intent of Absalom this has been determined since the day that he violated [Hebrew: anah] his sister Tamar." (2 Samuel 13:32 NAU); "They ravished [Hebrew: anah] the women in Zion, the virgins in the cities of Judah." (Lamentations 5:11 NAS))

Twelfth century Rabbi Moses Maimonides said the man's use of force would require that he marry his victim and never divorce her:

Every maiden expects to be married, her seducer therefore is only ordered to marry her; for he is undoubtedly the fittest husband for her. He will better heal her wound and redeem her character than any other husband. If, however, he is rejected by her or her father, he must give the dowry (Exodus 22:16). If he uses violence he has to submit to the additional punishment, "he may not put her away all his days" (Deuteronomy 22:29).

=== Middle Ages and early modern period ===
In medieval Europe, the term "rape" was sometimes used the historical sense meaning "abduct" in reference to elopement: a woman would give her consent to being abducted by the man she loved, and thus avoid asking permission from her parents to marry him.

According to Johannah Stiebert, women that were not engaged were not able to consent, so rape became a matter of male superiority. According to the Shulchan Aruch (1565), a codification of Jewish law by Joseph Karo, the girl or her father, depending on age, are given the option of demanding the man marry her in addition to paying a fine of 50 silver beyond any damages physical or mental.

=== 19th century ===
Article 357 of the French Penal Code of 1810 (not to be confused with the Napoleonic Code of 1804) contained a provision that if a man had 'abducted' a girl and married her, he could only be prosecuted if the girl's parents or legal guardians arranged to have the marriage annulled first. Although the law does not contain the word 'rape', it has been described as a marry-your-rapist law, which some scholars have claimed is responsible for spreading the phenomenon in the MENA region through French colonisation. Alternatively, similar legislation was spread in the region by the Ottoman Empire, based on Hanafi jurisprudence, which did explicitly mention 'rape' in abduction scenarios. Scholars continue to debate which laws derived from which.

=== 20th and 21st century ===
In several Middle Eastern and North African countries, marry-the-rapist laws that were adopted upon achieving independence in the mid-20th century, were carried over from various earlier periods. The origins of these laws are to be traced to a mixture of pre-existing local Arab traditions, Ottoman imperial laws and European (French and British) colonial laws. Traditionally, a woman was considered to be the property of her father. If she was raped, she was considered damaged property "so the rapist must either pay 'compensation' or accept the damaged goods" and marry the victim. To avoid paying the family, the perpetrator often chose to marry the victim, who "had absolutely no choice but to marry the rapist and spend the rest of the life" with him. In this way the victim of the assault had a harsher punishment than her attacker. Currently, India's Penal Code "makes it amply clear that marriage does not act as an absolving factor in case of rape".

Marry-your-rapist laws were common around the world until the 1970s. Since the late 20th century, the remaining laws of this type have been increasingly challenged and repealed in a number of countries.

In 1997, fifteen Latin American countries had laws that exonerated a rapist if he offered to marry the victim and she accepted. These were Argentina, Brazil, Chile, Colombia, Costa Rica, Ecuador, Guatemala, Honduras, Nicaragua, Panama, Peru (since 1924), Paraguay, the Dominican Republic, Uruguay and Venezuela. Costa Rica exonerated a rapist if he expresses an intention to marry the victim, even if she did not accept. The law in Peru was modified in 1991 to absolve all co-defendants in a gang rape case if any one of them married the victim. By 2017, all but four of these countries have definitively repealed these laws. Colombia repealed its law in 1997, Peru and Chile in 1999, Brazil and Uruguay in 2005, Nicaragua and Guatemala in 2006, Costa Rica in 2007, Panama in 2008, Argentina in 2012, Ecuador in 2014. Italy had similar laws until 1981.

In 2017, a World Bank Group report claimed there were 12 countries left with marry-your-rapist laws: Angola, Bahrain, Equatorial Guinea, Eritrea, Iraq, Jordan (repealed in August 2017), Lebanon (repealed July 2017), Libya, Palestine, the Philippines, Syria and Tunisia (repealed in July 2017). A Reuters report, in July of the same year, also listed Algeria, Kuwait and Tajikistan.

=== Illegal continued existence ===
The practice of forcing victims of rape to marry their rapists continues in some countries where the laws allowing this have been abolished, or never explicitly existed to begin with. This is the case, for example, in Ethiopia, where marriage by abduction remains common, despite it being illegal under the new 2004 Criminal Code. In Afghanistan, while formally there is no law, "in practice it is not uncommon for a prosecution to be dropped if marriage is offered by the perpetrator or his family." Similar to Afghanistan, Somaliland also did not previously have any laws; however, it was not uncommon for a rape victim's family to pressure them into marrying the perpetrator.

== Campaigns for repeal ==
A map of marry-your-rapist laws by country since 1980. Country has marry-your-rapist law Part of country's territory has marry-your-rapist law Country is in process of repealing its marry-your-rapist law Country repealed its marry-your-rapist law after 1980 Country not known to have had marry-your-rapist laws after 1980, never at all, or unknown

Several human rights organizations such as Human Rights Watch, and the United Nations Human Rights High Commission have strongly criticised these laws. These organizations have been working to abolish these laws, and in several cases they have been successful. However, the opposition to the "marry-your-rapist" laws has been less significant than campaigns to criminalize marital rape altogether.

=== Bahrain ===
Article 353 of the Bahrain penal code, dating from 1958, has undergone several amendments since its adoption. It provides that if a perpetrator of rape marries the rape victim before the final sentence is pronounced, the charges will be dropped and criminal proceedings will be suspended. The man is then able to divorce the rape victim.

The law has been criticized by the international community in the early twenty-first century. Parliament voted to abolish it on 31 May 2016, though the executive branch of the government was only willing to repeal the marriage option in case of a gang rape. Parliament discussed the bill repealing Article 353 again on 8 May 2018, but it was withdrawn and voting was postponed. Article 353 was ultimately abolished in May 2023.

=== Egypt ===
In 1999, Article 291 of the Egypt penal code was repealed by president Hosni Mubarak by presidential decree. The original article had been adopted in 1904 and inspired by a French provision. The original article allowed any individual who committed sexual assault to avoid penalty if he entered into marriage with the female victim. "In the Egyptian parliamentary debate surrounding the decree to remove the 'marriage loophole', some lawmakers have objected to altering the existing law on the grounds that it provided raped women with their only chance to marry, since after having been raped, no other man would want them. Rape law has, in statute and in practice, privileged the protection of social order over the provision of individual criminal justice."

=== El Salvador ===
In 1996, the Assembly of El Salvador repealed an old law that exonerated a rapist if he offered to marry the victim and she accepted. However, many rapists still had the ability to get away with rape by marrying the victim according to a law made in 1994 known as Article 14, which stated that as a general rule, persons under eighteen years of age can not marry, but established in the second paragraph, that exceptionally they can contract marriage if they are pubescent, they already have a child in common, or if the woman is pregnant. This law was abolished in 2017.

=== Iraq ===
Article 427 of Iraq's penal code, in its current form dating from 1969, states that if the perpetrator lawfully marries the victim, any legal action becomes void. Following parliamentary votes in favour of the abolition of similar laws in Lebanon, Jordan and Tunisia in 2017, women's rights activists made efforts to put the issue on the political agenda during the campaign for the 2018 Iraqi parliamentary election.

=== Italy ===
Article 544 of the Italian Criminal Code considered rape an offence against "public morality", not against an individual person. If the perpetrator married his victim, even if she was a minor, any sexual offence would lapse. Neither the law nor society made a distinction between such premarital rape on the one hand, and consensual elopement (in Sicily commonly called fuitina) on the other. Socially, the victim was put under heavy pressure to agree to marrying her rapist; the alternative was being shunned for the rest of her life as una donna svergognata: a "woman without honour" (literally: a shameless woman). The victim was held responsible for the humiliation of losing her virginity out of wedlock, bringing shame upon herself and her family. If she agreed to marry her attacker, it was thus considered a "reparational marriage" (matrimonio riparatore), that restored her family's honour.

In 1966, Franca Viola was one of the first women to refuse a "reparational marriage" publicly. She was 17 years old when she was raped with the intention of marriage in 1965. The aftermath of her trial ruled that rapists were no longer able to avoid punishment through the marriage of their victims. In 1981, Italy repealed Article 544.

=== Jordan ===
Article 308 of the Jordanian penal code allowed for the perpetrator of sexual assault to avoid persecution and punishment if he married the victim. Only if the marriage lasts under three years does he need to serve his time. Between 2010 and 2013, a total of 159 attackers walked free along the lines of their punishment. Jordan amended article 308 in 2016, barring full pardon in cases of rape but keeping a loophole clause that pardoned perpetrators if they married the victim if she is aged between 15 and 18 and if the assault was regarded as "consensual". Early in 2017, the 10-person Royal Committee for Developing the Judiciary and Enhancing the Rule of Law presented King Abdullah a report recommending the closing of the loophole. The article was abolished in a "historic vote" by the House of Representatives of the Parliament on 1 August 2017. It was then approved by the Senate and ratified by the King. The article had roots in colonialism rather than in Islam. It was remnant of Ottoman codes which had derived it from the French penal code (France only removed a similar provision in 1994).

=== Lebanon ===
Article 522 of the Lebanon Penal Code became a part of the law in the 1940s and stated that rape was a punishable offense, where the attacker could receive up to seven years in prison. However, no criminal prosecution would take place if the perpetrator and their victim got married, and stayed married for a minimum of three years. In 2017, Article 522 of the Lebanon Penal Code, which had been labelled a "rape law" was repealed and Articles 505 and 518 are to be reexamined. After Article 522 was repealed, it was argued by many that the law still lived on through Articles 505 and 518. Article 505 involves the act of sex with a minor, while Article 518 deals with the seduction of a minor accompanied by the promise of marriage.

=== Malaysia ===
Malaysia does not have a rape-marriage law, but nearly did by judicial ruling in 2015–16. The Sessions Court verdict that a man accused of two counts of statutory rape of a 14-year-old girl from Petra Jaya in the Malaysian part of Borneo in October 2015, would escape punishment because he claimed to have married his victim, was overruled by the High Court in Sabah and Sarawak in August 2016 after large-scale protests argued this would set a dangerous precedent for child rapists to escape punishment. Because Malaysia does not have a law against marital rape, it is not uncommon for a rapist to marry their victim after an attack, then claim that the assault happened after they were married. Perpetrators can indeed be punished for acts of sexual violence if they are not married to their victim, but the absence of a law against marital rape provides a loophole, allowing rapists to marry their victims to avoid punishment.

=== Morocco ===
In 2012, Morocco amended Article 475, which provided between one- and five-year prison sentence for a perpetrator that abducted or deceived a minor with no resort to violence or threat, or attempted to do so. The article included a second clause that permitted the prosecution be withdrawn if the perpetrator married the victim. A number of protests and campaigns took place in Morocco prior to the abolition of the Article. The Parliament abolished the law in 2014 as it was considered to be at odds with the 2011 constitution.

=== Palestine ===
Since being annexed by Egypt in 1959, the Gaza Strip has applied Egyptian penal law Articles 290 and 291, although these have been repealed in Egypt itself in 1999. After being annexed by Jordan in 1950, the West Bank has applied the 1960 Jordanian penal law Article 308. It is unclear how often the law was applied in practice. Ikhlas Sufan, director of a Nablus victims of violence shelter, told Human Rights Watch that "between 2011 and 2017 prosecution for rape has been halted in 60 cases – in which the shelter was helping the women – after the alleged rapist agreed to marry the victim. In 15 of these cases the women later divorced these men." After an activist campaign put pressure on the Palestinian Authority, president Mahmoud Abbas eventually signed Law no. 5 of 2018 on 14 March 2018, which repealed article 308 of the 1960 Penal Code enforced in the West Bank. However, because the Gaza Strip is de facto controlled by Hamas, the Egyptian-derived marry-your-rapist law still applies there.

=== Peru ===
After gaining independence in 1821, the first draft of the Peruvian penal code included a section specifically focused on the violence against women. This section encompassed a certain legal code that was meant to protect the virginity of women. It was not until 1924 when legislation was passed which stated that rapists were legally able to be exempt from sexual assault charges through a loophole. In cases of rape and to serve as a punishment for the perpetrator, the victim was required to enter into a marriage with their rapist. The notion that marriage could possibly restore a raped woman's honor has been linked to the country's historical, patriarchal, and gender norms. In 1991, this law was modified to absolve co-conspirators in a gang rape case if one of them marries the victim. These laws were enacted upon the belief that it would protect the honor of both the victim and their family.

According to cultural beliefs, instead of losing her virginity because of immoral behaviour, a woman – or her father – retains the ability to claim that the act had taken place due to coercion, thereby saving the victim's personal virtue. Marriage, in turn, would solve the problem of a lost virginity and possible illegitimate child, thus returning honor to the family. Peruvian government started to design and implement policies against domestic violence in 1988 after research showed them to have one of the highest rates of domestic violence against women ranking them 16th in the world. Per research, statistics from several Peruvian institutions, including emergency centers, police reports, and the Ministry for Women and Social Development, approximately 68,818 reports of sexual assaults were received during a ten-year span, which averages to an estimate of 18.8 cases that are reported per day.

On 3 April 1997, The Peruvian Congress voted to repeal the 1924 law that allowed rapists to be exonerated from sexual assault charges if they married their victims. The bill was passed by a vote of 86 to 1. According to congresswoman Beatriz Merino, who sponsored the bill, "This is a great victory for Peruvian women, and also for Peruvian men, since all of us together can celebrate the end of this embarrassment".

=== Somalia ===
Somali law draws its inspiration from civil law, Islamic law and xeer. As of 2018, most cases of rape and sexual assault in Somalia are still settled through xeer, which is the country's native traditional "caste-based dispute resolution system in which traditional male elders dispense justice according to customary laws." Following the customs of xeer, it is common for a "diya" (a fine of money, camels or goats) to be paid by the rapist's family to the rape survivor's family, but in extreme scenarios, the victim is forced to marry her rapist.

Since January 1991, Somalia has been in a state of civil war, without a functioning central government that controls the entire country. The northwestern region of Somaliland unilaterally declared independence in May 1991, while the northeastern region of Puntland unilaterally declared its regional autonomy within Somalia in 1998; both gradually evolved their own legal systems, and made efforts to outlaw the practice of forcing a rape victim to marry her attacker in the late 2010s.

==== Puntland ====
The self-declared autonomous region of Puntland adopted a Sexual Offences Act in 2017, that criminalised all forms of sexual violence against women.

==== Somaliland ====
The unrecognised state of Somaliland, which declared its independence in 1991 but is internationally still considered part of Somalia, did not have any law explicitly allowing rapists to marry their victims in order to go free. However, since the practice is in fact occurring, which a number of politicians have found undesirable, efforts have been undertaken to formally ban it. In January 2018, the government "introduced a bill to outlaw rape and other violent sexual crimes for the first time in its history, which would see rapists imprisoned for up to 30 years". The bill was approved by the lower house of Parliament. The president of Somaliland, Musa Bihi Adbi, hoped that this law will help to eliminate violence against women throughout the country.

=== Syria ===
Syria's laws concerning rape, are that a rapist can escape punishment if the victim agrees to marriage as stated in Article 508 of the penal code, "If there is a contracted marriage between the man who commits rape, sexual abuse, kidnapping, sexual harassment and the victim, then there is no charge or the punishment is stopped”. This law is particularly harmful because many victims are pressured into marrying their rapist due to societal stigma towards the victims. Unlike some other countries, rapists cannot marry victims that are too young to get married, even in cases of pregnancy and, in fact, receive an extended prison sentence.

=== Tunisia ===
In July 2017, Tunisia repealed Article 227 of its Criminal Code which provided a rapist the exemption to avoid all investigations or legal consequences if he married his victim. This repeal of the "marry-your-rapist" law was part of a much larger law in Tunisia to outlaw all violence against women. In a 2010 study by the National Office of Family and Population, 47% of Tunisian women reported being victims of violence. In an event that occurred in 2016, a young man raped his 13-year-old step-sister and married her after she became pregnant. An alleged rapist was able to end his prosecution if he married his victim. The court ruled that this was allowed under Article 277, which has since been removed. The backlash that was received after this ruling contributed to the repeal of the Article in 2017. The new law encompasses all forms of violence or discrimination against women, such as psychological abuse or economic discrimination, and is thus a breakthrough for women's rights in Tunisia. The same law criminalizes marital rape, classifying it as a crime in its own right, and has been commended for its preventative measures to the issue of violence.

Background

Under the Ben Ali regime, women's rights were not given much importance. Women made up only 20% of Tunisia's work force, and they were constrained to low-paying, insecure jobs. Rural Tunisian women also faced deprivation and hardship. Freedoms of expression and association were limited. Heavy restrictions on registration to work for women's organizations and political parties were in place. The overwhelming participation of women during the Tunisian revolution in 2011 made way for transformative changes in Tunisian politics in regards to gender. Tunisia has since been a symbol of advancement of women's rights in the Arab world, being one of the first countries to establish women's voting rights, right to abortion, right to divorce and outlawing polygamy. At the outset of the revolution, women were as active as men in demanding equal access to jobs, education and basic rights and freedoms. Women were heavily involved in the drafting of the new constitution after the revolution, which guarantees equality based on gender in at least one area. Article 21 of the constitution states that "All male and female citizens have the same rights and duties. They are equal before the law without discrimination." Candidate quotas were introduced in Article 16, which guaranteed equal representation of women in politics. Considering the importance given to women's rights, many considered the repeal of the "marry-your-rapist" law a matter of time. When Article 277 was repealed, Bochra Belhaj, a parliament member, passed out celebratory jasmine blossoms. The new law, called Law No. 58 of 2017 of 11 August 2017, went into effect on 1 February 2018.

=== Uruguay ===
Article 116 of the Penal Code and Articles 22 and 23 of the executive order nº 15.032 of Uruguay were repealed in 2005. The articles stated that in crimes of sexual assault, statutory rape, abduction, and disrespect of modesty, the penalty would be extinguished in cases where the assailant and the victim made a matrimonial contract.

=== United States ===
Though there is no federal marry-your-rapist law in the United States, laws resembling marry-your-rapist laws formerly existed in Missouri and Florida. This resulted from loopholes in laws that allow for marriage below the age of consent, thus circumventing statutory rape laws.

==== Missouri ====
The age of consent in Missouri is 17. According to a March 2018 article in the Journal Star (Peoria), more than 300 men aged 21 or older married with 15-year-old girls in the state of Missouri between 1999 and 2015. For the men who had premarital sex with the girls they later married, this would constitute statutory rape according to Missouri law, which defines statutory rape as "anyone 21 or older having sex with someone younger than 17 outside of marriage". However, sex is legal within marriage, even with a minor, and Missouri allowed marriage from the age of 15 until August 2018, when a law passed establishing a minimum age of 16 and forbidding marriages between someone under 18 and someone over 21. This created a loophole by which statutory rape could be covered up if the marriage is concluded before the authorities found out sexual intercourse has taken place (especially if it resulted in a pregnancy). This allowed for the suspect to be exempt from prosecution (for example, imprisonment and having to register as a sex offender). Social pressure could be put on the alleged victim to agree to marry her statutory rapist to make him avoid punishment. Moreover, because of Missouri's age loophole, a number of out-of-state couples travelled to Missouri to marry.

==== Florida ====
The age of consent in Florida is 18. However, until March 2018, the state of Florida allowed marriage without any minimum age for a girl if she was pregnant and a judge approved of the marriage. In this manner, the man who impregnated her could avoid being prosecuted for statutory rape. The current law requires anyone seeking marriage to be at least 18 years old, or 17 with the other partner not being more than two years older and the minor having received parental consent; pregnancy is no longer a factor.

== Laws by country ==
Marry-your-rapist laws by country or territory
Country	Adopted	Repealed	Notes
Algeria		–	Article 326 of the Algerian penal law states that if an "abducted or hijacked" minor marries her abductor, the abductor can only be prosecuted when the marriage is annulled by a person who has the right to annul it.
Angola		–	
Argentina	<1997	2012	See also: Avenimiento Article 132 of Argentine Penal Code stated that if a rape victim over the age of 16 agreed to marry her rapist, he could be freed from prison.
Bahrain	1976	Unknown	Article 353 exempts rapists (defined in Article 344) from punishment if they marry their victim. Parliament voted to abolish it on 31 May 2016, but the government is still opposed.
Bolivia	<1997	–	Article 317 states that there will be no punishment if defendants marry their victim before the sentence is passed. CEDAW called on Bolivia to repeal it.
Brazil	<1984	2005	Article 107 stated that a perpetrator's penalty was annulled when he married the person he made a victim, according to crimes listed elsewhere in the Code, including rape.
Bulgaria		2015	Until September 2015, under Bulgaria's penal code, a rapist could escape punishment, even in the case of statutory rape, if it was followed by marriage.
Cameroon		–	Section 297 of Cameroon's Penal Code prevents prosecution for rape when marriage has been "freely consented" to by both parties, and the assaulted woman was "over the age of puberty" during the offence.
Chile	<1997	1999	A new Sexual Crimes Code, which no longer contained a rape-marriage law, was enacted in July 1999.
Colombia	<1997	1997	
Costa Rica	<1997	2007	Article 92 stated that punishment of an accused or condemned person would be cancelled if he married his underage victim, if legally possible and no objections exist from her legal representatives and the National Children's Fund.
Denmark		2013	Until 2013, according to section 227 of the Danish Penal Code, the penalty for rape committed pursuant to section 216 and for other sexual offences (sections 217–226) could be "reduced or remitted if the persons, between whom the sexual intercourse has taken place, have since married each other or registered their partnership."
Dominican Republic	<1997	Unknown	
Ecuador	<1997	2014	In August 2014, a new criminal code came into force in Ecuador, and it no longer contains such provisions.
Egypt	1904	1999	Article 291 of Egypt's penal code allowed rapists or kidnappers to escape prosecution by marrying their victim.
El Salvador		1996/2017	The standard marry-your-rapist law was repealed in 1996; and Article 14, introduced in 1994, which provided a loophole in which a rapist would not be prosecuted if the victim is underaged, impregnated, and agrees to marry their rapist, was repealed in 2017.
Equatorial Guinea		–	
Eritrea		–	
Ethiopia		2005	In the Ethiopian Penal Code, Articles 558 and 599 had allowed a perpetrator to be free from their crimes in the case of marriage to the victim following the incidence. In July 2004, the Ethiopian Parliament adopted a new Penal Code that is more strict and does not contain the stipulation that the perpetrator escapes punishment if he marries the victim. Before the Penal Code became law, it had to be translated into English, signed by Ethiopia's President, and published into their official gazette.
France	1810	1994	Until 1994, France kept in the French Penal Code the article that exonerated a rapist in the event of a marriage to their victim. When entered without any form of valid consent, marriage is either null or nullified domestically. The French Penal Code states that crimes committed with the intention of forcing a person to marry, or against a person that refuses to marry, will have stricter penalties.
Greece		2018	In 2018, Greece repealed article 339 (3), which allowed marriage as a permissible settlement for "seduction" of a child.
Guatemala	<1997	2006	Article 200 stated that a rapist could be exonerated if he promised to marry his victim, provided she had reached the age of 12.
Honduras	<1997	Unknown	
Iraq	1969	–	Article 427 of Iraq's penal code states that if the perpetrator lawfully marries the victim, any legal action becomes void.
Italy		1981	In 1981, Italy repealed Article 544 of the Penal Code that allowed rapists to marry their victims to avoid punishment.
Jordan	1960	2017	On 1 August 2017, Parliament voted to abolish Article 308 of Jordan's penal code. The Senate and the King approved the amendment.
Kuwait	1960	–	Article 182 states that if the rapist legally marries his victim with her guardian's permission, and the guardian requests that he is not punished, he will not be punished as he would be under Article 180.
Lebanon	1948	2017	In 2017, Lebanon abolished Article 522 and declared reexamination of Articles 505 and 518. Article 522 allowed for halting the prosecution or suspending the conviction of a person who had committed rape, kidnapping, or statutory rape if he married the victim. The repeal was seen as a "partial victory" as Article 505, which involves sex with a minor who is 15 years of age, and Article 518, which concerns the seduction of a minor with the promise of marriage, continue to provide exoneration if a marriage takes place.
Libya	1953	–	Under Article 424, the perpetrator, as well as any accomplice, can avoid imprisonment for rape as stipulated in Article 407 if he makes a contract of marriage with his victim.
Mexico	1931	1991 (national)	The national marry-your-rapist law was repealed in 1991. In 2017, the laws of three states (Campeche, Baja California and Sonora) provide that marriage to the victim exonerates the perpetrator of the crime of estupro (seduction of minors).
Morocco		2014	Article 475 of Morocco's penal code exempted rapists from punishment if they married their victim.
Mozambique	1886	2014	Article 400 of the Portuguese penal code of 1886, which still functioned in post-colonial Mozambique until its replacement on 11 July 2014, stated that rapists who married their victim would not be punished. The law had not been applied since independence in 1974.
Nicaragua	<1997	2008	Article 196 stated that if the victim marries the offender or grants her pardon, the procedure is suspended and the sentence imposed is cancelled.
Palestine	1959	2018 (West Bank) – (Gaza)	Article 308 of the 1960 Jordanian Penal Code, which applies in the West Bank, was repealed on 14 March 2018. However, Articles 290 and 291 of the old Egyptian Penal Code are still applied in the Hamas-controlled Gaza Strip.
Panama	<1997	2008	Article 225 stated that a rapist could marry his victim (aged 14 or older) in order to avoid potential charges.
Paraguay	<1997	Unknown	
Peru	1924	1999	The 1924 law, Article 78, was modified in 1991 to absolve co-defendants in a gang rape case if one of them married the victim.
Philippines		–	The Anti-Rape Law of 1997 states "Article 266-C. Effect of Pardon. - The subsequent valid marriage between the offended party shall extinguish the criminal action or the penalty imposed." See Rape in the Philippines.
Romania		2000	
Russia		–	Article 134 of Russian criminal code states, that if the perpetrator is aged 18 or older and has committed first-time statutory rape with a minor between the age of 14 and 16 for the first time, he is exempt from punishment if he marries the victim.
Syria	1949	–	Syria's penal code Article 508, in combination with Article 489, is a perfect copy of the Lebanese Articles 503 and 522.
Tajikistan		–	
Thailand		–	An offence may be settled through marrying the victim if she is over 15 years old and "consented" during the offence, and the court grants permission to the perpetrator, who must be at least 18.
Tonga	1926	–	The Parent Consent Act 1926 allows rapists to marry their victim (between the age of 14 and 18) if the victim's parents give consent.
Tunisia	1913	2017	Article 227 states the offender's prosecution or sentence is suspended if he marries his victim. The proposal to repeal the law was approved by Parliament on 26 July 2017.
Turkey		2005	Turkey's rape-marriage law was repealed in 2005, as part of efforts to join the European Union. In November 2016, a government plan to reinstate the law and exonerate around 3,000 rapists by having them marry their victims was cancelled due to mass protests.
Uruguay	<1997	2006	Article 116.
Venezuela	<1997	partially struck down by judicial decisions by the Supreme Tribunal of Justice (Venezuela) in 1999 and 2015	Article 393 (formally 395), amended in 1999, states that "persons guilty of seduction, rape or abduction shall, unless marriage takes place, be sentenced to pay civil compensation to the victim."

== See also ==
- Effects and aftermath of rape
- Rape by proxy
- Rape culture
- Raptio
- Types of marriage
- Types of rape
