= Voting at the Eurovision Song Contest =

The winner of the Eurovision Song Contest is determined by a positional voting system. Under the latest version of this system, introduced in 2026, each participating country awards two sets of 12, 10, 8, 7, 6, 5, 4, 3, 2 and 1 points, based on their ten favourite songs from other countries. One set of rankings is provided by a professional jury, and the other by televoting in that country.

== Overview ==
Small, demographically-balanced juries assembled by each participating broadcaster and made up of ordinary people had been used to rank the entries and award the points from each country. After the widespread use of telephone voting in 1998, the ranking resorts to juries only in the event of a televoting malfunctions. In 2003, for example, Eircom's telephone polling system malfunctioned. Irish broadcaster RTÉ did not receive the polling results from them in time, and used the backup jury instead. Between 1997 and 2003, the first years of televoting, lines were opened to the public for only five minutes after the performance and recap of the final song. Between 2004 and 2006, the lines were opened for ten minutes. From 2007 to 2009, they were opened for fifteen minutes. As of 2026, the voting is open for approximately 15 to 25 minutes after the end of the last performance in the semi-finals, and analogously for approximately 25 and 40 minutes after the end of the last performance in the final; the "Rest of the World" vote additionally runs from midnight local time in each timezone on the day of each show. Viewers may cast up to 20 votes per show, for each phone number or payment method; this figure was reduced to 10 from 2026 onwards.

In 2010, 2011, 2024 and 2025, viewers were allowed to vote during the performances. Since the 2004 contest, the presenters will start the televoting window with an invitation: "Europe, start voting now!" was used until 2014, "Europe and Australia, start voting now!" (due to Australia's debut) between 2015 and 2022, and "Europe, Australia, and the rest of the world, start voting now!" (due to the introduction of the "Rest of the World" vote) since 2023. At the end of the voting period, the presenters will tell viewers to stop with a final countdown, along with the phrase "Europe, Australia, and the rest of the world, stop voting now!". The United Kingdom is not able to vote via SMS or the smartphone app, due to legislation implemented after the 2007 British premium-rate phone-in scandal. San Marino has never been able to use televoting because it does not have a telephone network independent of Italy's.

In the first contest in 1956, only the winning song was announced at the conclusion of the event, with the results of the remaining participants unknown. Since 1957, a spokesperson, appointed by each participating broadcaster, was contacted by telephone to reveal the points or votes from its country. This method continued to be used until 1993, except for a few occasions in which the international juries were located in the host country and voted directly on screen. Since 1994, the spokespersons have appeared on screen through a live satellite link.

To announce the points in the final, the contest's presenters invite each spokesperson to read the country's points in French or English. The presenters originally repeated the points in both languages, however, since 2004, the points have only been translated due to time constraints. To offset increased voting time required by a larger number of participating countries, from 2006 to 2015 each spokesperson only read out the top three scores of their respective country's vote: 8, 10 and 12 points. Points from one to seven were added automatically to the scoreboard, while each spokesperson was introduced.

The scoreboard displays the number of points each country has received, and, since 2008, a progress bar indicating the number of countries which have voted. In 2016, as part of a new voting system that was being implemented, it was decided that only the 12-point mark would be read aloud, meaning that points one through eight, as well as ten, were added automatically to the scoreboard. The televoting points were combined and the presenters announced them in order, starting from the country with the lowest score and ending with the country with the highest score, from the televoting. Beginning with the 2019 contest, the televoting points are announced by the presenters based on the juries' rankings, in reverse order.

== Voting systems ==
Year	Show(s)	Points	Voting system
1956	Final	(1 to 10) × 2	Two jurors per country scores each song on a scale of 1 to 10. (Note: The 1956 contest is the only edition in which jurors were allowed to vote for the songs representing their own country.)
1957–1961	Final	1 x 10	Ten-member juries distribute 10 votes, with each juror giving one vote to its favourite song.
1962	Final	3, 2, 1	Ten-member juries rank their three favourite songs, and cast 3, 2 and 1 points.
1963	Final	5, 4, 3, 2, 1	Twenty-member juries rank their five favourite songs, and cast 5, 4, 3, 2, and 1 points.
1964–1966	Final	5, 3, 1 (3 songs); 6, 3 (2 songs); 9 (1 song)	Ten-member juries distribute 9 points in three possible ways. If all their points go to one song, it gets all the 9 points, If they go to two songs, they got 6 and 3 points, If they go to three or more, the top three gets 5, 3 and 1 points. No jury ever gave 9 points to a single song, but Belgium used the 6, 3 system in 1965.
1967–1970	Final	1 x 10	Ten-member juries distribute 10 votes, with each juror giving one vote to their favourite song. In 1970, a tie-breaking round was available.
1971–1973	Final	(1 to 5) × 2	Two jurors per country, one aged over 25 and the other under 25, with at least 10 years between their ages, score each song on a scale of 1 to 5.
1974	Final	1 × 10	Ten-member juries distribute 10 votes, with each juror giving one vote to its favourite song.
1975–1996	Final	12, 10, 8, 7, 6, 5, 4, 3, 2, 1	All countries have at least 11 jury members, raised to 16 in 1988, that rank their top ten songs, and cast 12, 10, 8, 7, 6, 5, 4, 3, 2, 1 points. From 1975 to 1979, the points were announced in the order in which the songs performed. In 1980, an ascending format of going from 1–8 points, 10 points and 12 points, was introduced.
1997	Final	12, 10, 8, 7, 6, 5, 4, 3, 2, 1	Twenty countries have jury members and five countries use a televote to decide which songs would get points.
1998–2000	Final	12, 10, 8, 7, 6, 5, 4, 3, 2, 1	All countries are encouraged to use telephone voting to decide which songs would receive points. In exceptional circumstances where televoting is not possible, only a jury is used.
2001–2002	Final	12, 10, 8, 7, 6, 5, 4, 3, 2, 1	Every broadcaster is free to make a choice between the full televoting system and the mixed 50/50 system to decide which songs would receive points. In exceptional circumstances where televoting is not possible, only a jury is used.
2003	Final	12, 10, 8, 7, 6, 5, 4, 3, 2, 1	All countries are encouraged to use telephone/SMS voting to decide which songs would receive points. In exceptional circumstances where televoting was not possible at all, only a jury was used.
2004–2007	All shows	12, 10, 8, 7, 6, 5, 4, 3, 2, 1	All countries use televoting and/or SMS-voting to decide which songs would receive points. Back-up juries are used by each country, with eight members, in the event of a televoting failure.
2008	All shows	12, 10, 8, 7, 6, 5, 4, 3, 2, 1	All countries use televoting and/or SMS-voting to decide which songs would receive points. Back-up juries are used by each country, with eight members, in the event of a televoting failure.
2009	Semi-finals	12, 10, 8, 7, 6, 5, 4, 3, 2, 1	All countries use televoting and/or SMS-voting to decide which songs would receive points. Back-up juries are used by each country, with eight members, in the event of a televoting failure.
2009	Final	12, 10, 8, 7, 6, 5, 4, 3, 2, 1	All countries use televoting and/or SMS-voting (50%) and five-member juries (50%), except San Marino, which uses 100% jury. This is a so called jury–televote 50/50. In the event of a televoting failure, only a jury is used by that country. In the event of a jury failure, only televoting is used by that country. The two parts of the vote are combined by awarding 12, 10, 8, 7, 6, 5, 4, 3, 2, 1 points to the top ten in each discipline, Then the points are merged and converted into a single set of points. In the event of a tie, the televote ranking takes precedence.
2010–2012	All shows	12, 10, 8, 7, 6, 5, 4, 3, 2, 1	
2013–2015	All shows	12, 10, 8, 7, 6, 5, 4, 3, 2, 1	The same as in 2009–2012, except the jury and televote are combined differently; The jurors and televoting each rank all the competing entries, rather than just their top ten. The points are then added together. In the event of a tie, the televote ranking takes precedence.
2016–2017	All shows	(12, 10, 8, 7, 6, 5, 4, 3, 2, 1) × 2	The jury and the televote each award an independent set of points. The jury points are announced first. Then the televoting points are calculated together before being added to the jury points, effectively doubling the points which can be awarded in total.
2018–2022	All shows	(12, 10, 8, 7, 6, 5, 4, 3, 2, 1) × 2	The same as in 2016–2017, but the points from a country's jury are now calculated using an exponential weight model, giving more weight to higher-ranked songs and lessens the impact of one juror placing a song lower in their rankings.
2023–2025	Semi-finals	12, 10, 8, 7, 6, 5, 4, 3, 2, 1	Only the televote is used to decide which songs receive points. Juries are used by each country as a backup in the event that the televoting cannot deliver a valid result. Online votes from viewers in non-participating countries are aggregated and awarded as one set of points under "Rest of the World".
2023–2025	Final	(12, 10, 8, 7, 6, 5, 4, 3, 2, 1) × 2	The jury and the televote each award an independent set of points. If the jury of a country cannot deliver a valid result, the televoting result of that country is used in its place. If the televoting cannot deliver a valid result, an aggregated result is used. In case that fails too, the jury result is used. Online votes from viewers in non-participating countries are aggregated and awarded as one set of points under "Rest of the World".
2026–present	All shows	(12, 10, 8, 7, 6, 5, 4, 3, 2, 1) × 2	The same as in 2018–2022, with the addition of the "Rest of the World" set of points and juries consist of seven members as opposed to five.

The most-used voting system, other than the current one, was last used for the 1974 contest. This system was used from 1957 to 1961 and from 1967 to 1969. Ten jurors in each country, each cast one vote for their favourite song. In 1969, this resulted in a four-way tie for first place, between the UK, the Netherlands, France, and Spain, with no tie-breaking procedure. A second round of voting in the event of a tie was introduced to this system in 1970.

From 1962 to 1966, a voting system similar to the current one was used. In 1962, each country awarded its top three 1, 2 and 3 points. In 1963 the top five were awarded 1, 2, 3, 4 and 5 points. From 1964 to 1966, each country usually awarded its top three 1, 3, and 5 points. With the latter system, a country could choose to give points to two countries, instead of three, giving 3 to one and 6 to the other. In 1965, Belgium awarded the United Kingdom 6 points and Italy 3. Although it was possible to give one country 9 points, this never occurred.

The 1971, 1972, and 1973 contests saw the jurors "in vision" for the first time. Each country was represented by two jurors: one older than 25 and one younger, with at least 10 years' difference in their ages. Each juror gave a minimum of 1 point and a maximum of 5 points to each song. In 1974 the previous system of ten jurors was used. In 1975, the current system was introduced. Spokespeople were next seen on screen in 1994, with a satellite link to the venue.

The 2004 contest had its first semi-final, with a slight change in voting: countries which did not qualify from the semi-final would be allowed to cast points in the final. This resulted in Ukraine's "Wild Dances" by Ruslana finishing first, with a record 280 points. If the voting had been conducted as it had been from 1956 to 2003, when only finalist countries could vote, Serbia and Montenegro's "Lane moje" by Željko Joksimović would have won the contest with 190 points: a 15-point lead over "Wild Dances", who would have scored 175 points. To date, non-qualifying countries are still allowed to vote in the final. In 2006, Serbia and Montenegro were able to vote in the semi-final and the final, despite their non-participation due to a scandal in the selection process, which resulted in Macedonia progressing to the final instead of Poland.

With the introduction of two semi-finals in 2008, a new method of selecting finalists was created. The top nine songs, ranked by televote, qualified, along with one song selected by the back-up juries. This method, in most cases, meant that the tenth song in the televoting failed to qualify. This attracted some criticism, especially from Macedonia, who had placed 10th in the televote in both years. In 2010, the 2009 final system was used, with a combination of televoting and jury points from each country used to select the semi-finalists. Each participating country had a national jury, consisting of five music industry professionals, appointed by national broadcasters. From 2026, each national jury consists of seven members, with two of them required to be between the ages of 18 and 25.

== Highest scores ==
As the number of participating countries and the voting systems have varied throughout the contest's history, it may be more relevant to compare what percentage of all points awarded in the competition each song received, computed from the published scoreboards.

The Russian entry at the 2015 contest, "A Million Voices" by Polina Gagarina, became the first song to get over 300 points without winning the contest, and the only one during the era when each country delivered only one set of points. With a new voting system introduced in 2016, Australia became the first country to get over 500 points without winning the contest. In 2017, Bulgaria became the first non-winning country to score above 600 points, as well as Portugal becoming the first country to get over 750 points – winning the contest with the song "Amar pelos dois", by Salvador Sobral.

Since the introduction of the 2016 voting system, the Swedish entry at the 2022 contest, "Hold Me Closer" by Cornelia Jakobs, holds the record for receiving the highest percentage of maximum points from the juries, receiving 222 out of 240 points (92.50%) in the second semi-final. "Stefania" by Kalush Orchestra, winner of that year's contest for Ukraine, holds the record for receiving the highest percentage of maximum points from the televoting, receiving 439 out of 468 points (93.80%) in the final.

=== Top five winners by percentage of all points ===
This table shows top five winning songs, by the percentage of all points cast.

Year	Country	Artist	Song	Points	% of all points cast	% of maximum possible points
1964	Italy	Gigliola Cinquetti	"Non ho l'età"	49	34.03%	65.33%
1957	Netherlands	Corry Brokken	"Net als toen"	31	31.00%	34.44%
1967	United Kingdom	Sandie Shaw	"Puppet on a String"	47	27.65%	29.38%
1962	France	Isabelle Aubret	"Un premier amour"	26	27.08%	57.78%
1958	France	André Claveau	"Dors, mon amour"	27	27.00%	30.00%

=== Top five winners by percentage of the maximum possible score ===
This table shows top five winning songs, by the percentage of the maximum possible score a song can achieve.

Contest	Country	Artist	Song	Points	% of all points cast	% of maximum possible points
1973	Luxembourg	Anne-Marie David	"Tu te reconnaîtras"	129	8.66%	80.63%
1976	United Kingdom	Brotherhood of Man	"Save Your Kisses for Me"	164	15.71%	80.39%
1982	Germany	Nicole	"Ein bißchen Frieden"	161	15.42%	78.92%
1997	United Kingdom	Katrina and the Waves	"Love Shine a Light"	227	15.66%	78.82%
2009	Norway	Alexander Rybak	"Fairytale"	387	15.89%	78.66%

=== Top ten participants by number of points ===
This table shows the top ten participating songs, both winning and non-winning, by the number of points received.

Contest	Country	Artist	Song	Points	% of all points cast	% of maximum possible points
2017	Portugal	Salvador Sobral	"Amar pelos dois"	758	15.56%	77.03%
2022	Ukraine	Kalush Orchestra	"Stefania"	631	13.60%	67.41%
2017	Bulgaria	Kristian Kostov	"Beautiful Mess"	615	12.62%	62.50%
2024	Switzerland	Nemo	"The Code"	591	13.59%	67.47%
2023	Sweden	Loreen	"Tattoo"	583	13.40%	66.55%
2024	Croatia	Baby Lasagna	"Rim Tim Tagi Dim"	547	12.57%	62.44%
2016	Ukraine	Jamala	"1944"	534	10.96%	54.27%
2018	Israel	Netta	"Toy"	529	10.61%	52.48%
2023	Finland	Käärijä	"Cha Cha Cha"	526	12.09%	60.05%
2021	Italy	Måneskin	"Zitti e buoni"	524	11.58%	57.46%

Under the 2013–15 voting system, Portugal would have received 17.12% of points in the 2017 contest.

=== Top ten participants by number of jury points ===
Contest	Country	Artist	Song	Jury points	Total points	% of points from jury voting	% of maximum possible points from jury voting
2017	Portugal	Salvador Sobral	"Amar pelos dois"	382	758	50.40%	77.64%
2024	Switzerland	Nemo	"The Code"	365	591	61.76%	84.49%
2015	Sweden	Måns Zelmerlöw	"Heroes"	363	365	–	77.56%
2023	Sweden	Loreen	"Tattoo"	340	583	58.32%	78.70%
2016	Australia	Dami Im	"Sound of Silence"	320	511	62.62%	65.04%
2009	Norway	Alexander Rybak	"Fairytale"	312	387	–	63.41%
2012	Sweden	Loreen	"Euphoria"	296	372	–	60.16%
2022	United Kingdom	Sam Ryder	"Space Man"	283	466	60.73%	60.47%
2017	Bulgaria	Kristian Kostov	"Beautiful Mess"	278	615	45.20%	56.50%
2018	Austria	Cesár Sampson	"Nobody But You"	271	342	79.24%	53.77%

=== Top ten participants by number of televoting points ===
Contest	Country	Artist	Song	Televote points	Total points	% of points from televoting	% of maximum possible points from televoting
2022	Ukraine	Kalush Orchestra	"Stefania"	439	631	69.57%	93.80%
2009	Norway	Alexander Rybak	"Fairytale"	378	387	–	76.83%
2017	Portugal	Salvador Sobral	"Amar pelos dois"	376	758	49.60%	76.42%
2023	Finland	Käärijä	"Cha Cha Cha"	376	526	71.48%	84.68%
2015	Italy	Il Volo	"Grande amore"	366	292	–	78.21%
2016	Russia	Sergey Lazarev	"You Are the Only One"	361	491	73.52%	73.37%
2012	Sweden	Loreen	"Euphoria"	343	372	–	69.72%
2017	Bulgaria	Kristian Kostov	"Beautiful Mess"	337	615	54.80%	68.50%
2024	Croatia	Baby Lasagna	"Rim Tim Tagi Dim"	337	547	61.61%	75.90%
2012	Russia	Buranovskiye Babushki	"Party for Everybody"	332	259	–	67.48%

== Tie-breakers ==
A tie-break procedure was implemented after the 1969 contest, in which France, the Netherlands, Spain and the United Kingdom tied for first place. With no tie-breaking system in place at the time, all four countries were declared joint winners. In protest, Austria, Finland, Sweden, Norway and Portugal did not participate the following year.

In 1991, the tie-break procedure was implemented when Sweden and France both had 146 points at the end of the voting. At the time, there was no televoting system, and the tie-break rule was slightly different. The first tie-break rule at the time concerned the number of 12 points each country received. Both Sweden and France received the maximum 12 points four times. When the number of 10-point scores was counted, Sweden, with "Fångad av en stormvind" by Carola, claimed its third victory, since it received five 10-point scores against France's two. The French entry, "C'est le dernier qui a parlé qui a raison" by Amina, finished second, with the smallest-ever losing margin.

The current tie-break procedure was implemented in the 2016 contest. In the procedure, sometimes known as a countback, if two or more countries tie, the song receiving more points from the televote is the winner. If the songs received the same number of televote points, the song that received at least one televote point, from the greatest number of countries, is the winner. If there is still a tie, a second tie-breaker counts the number of countries, who assigned twelve televote points to each entry in the tie. Tie-breaks continue with ten points, eight points, and so on until the tie is resolved. If the tie cannot be resolved after the number of countries which assigned one point to the song is equal, the song performed earlier in the running order is declared the winner. The tie-break procedure originally applied only to first place ties, or to determine a semi-final qualifier. Since 2008, it has been applied to all places.

Overview of tie-breaking rules
Year	Use	Description
1956–1969	—N/a	No tie-breaking rules were in place.
1970–1988	To determine the winner.	The jury decided the winner through a simple vote for their favourite.
1989–2000	To determine the winner.	The winner of a tie is the country that received more 12 points, then 10 points. If the tie cannot be broken in this way, all tied countries are winners.
2001–2002	To determine the winner To determine the qualifiers for the following year.	The winner of a tie is the country that received more 12 points, then 10 points, all the way down to 1. If the tie cannot be broken in this way, all tied countries are winners.
2003	To determine the winner.	The winner of a tie is the country that received points from more countries, Then the country that received more 12 points, then 10 points, all the way down to 1. If the tie cannot be broken in this way, all tied countries are winners.
2004–2006	To determine the winner To determine the 10th qualifier from the semi-final.	The winner of a tie is the country that received points from more countries, Then the country that received more 12 points, then 10 points, all the way down to 1. If the tie cannot be broken in this way, all tied countries are winners.
2007	To determine the winner To determine the 10th qualifier from the semi-final.	The winner of a tie is the country that received points from more countries, Then the country that received more 12 points, then 10 points, all the way down to 1. If the tie cannot be broken in this way, the country that performed earlier wins the tie.
2008–2015	Used for all ties.	The winner of a tie is the country that received points from more countries, Then the country that received more 12 points, then 10 points, all the way down to 1. If the tie cannot be broken in this way, the country that performed earlier wins the tie.
2016–present	Used for all ties.	The winner of a tie is the country that received more points from the televoting, Then the country that received points from more countries in the televoting, Then the country that received more 12 points in the televoting, then 10 points, all the way down to 1. If the tie cannot be broken in this way, the country that performed earlier wins the tie.

== Scoring no points ==
Countries that received no points in the grand final jury voting, and the number of times for each

As each participating country casts a series of preference votes, under the current scoring system it is rare that a song fails to receive any points at all. Such a result means that the song failed to make the top ten most popular songs in any country.

The first zero points in Eurovision were scored in 1962, under a new voting system. When a country finishes with a score of zero, it is often referred to in English-language media as nul points /ˌnjuːl ˈpwæ̃/ or nil points /ˌnɪl ˈpɔɪnts/, albeit incorrectly. Grammatical French for "no points" is pas de points, zéro point or aucun point, but none of these phrases are used in the contest. Before the voting overhaul in 2016, no-point scores were not announced by the presenters. Following the change in the voting system, a country receiving no points from the public televote is simply announced as receiving "zero points".

=== Before 1975 ===
Various systems of voting were used prior to 1975.

Zero points
Contest	Entry
1962	Belgium; Fud Leclerc "Ton nom"
1962	Spain; Víctor Balaguer "Llámame"
1962	Austria; Eleonore Schwarz "Nur in der Wiener Luft"
1962	Netherlands; De Spelbrekers "Katinka"
1963	Netherlands; Annie Palmen "Een speeldoos"
1963	Norway; Anita Thallaug "Solhverv"
1963	Finland; Laila Halme "Muistojeni laulu"
1963	Sweden; Monica Zetterlund "En gång i Stockholm"
1964	Germany; Nora Nova "Man gewöhnt sich so schnell an das Schöne"
1964	Portugal; António Calvário "Oração"
1964	Yugoslavia; Sabahudin Kurt "Život je sklopio krug"
1964	Switzerland; Anita Traversi "I miei pensieri"
1965	Spain; Conchita Bautista "¡Qué bueno, qué bueno!"
1965	Germany; Ulla Wiesner "Paradies, wo bist du?"
1965	Belgium; Lize Marke "Als het weer lente is"
1965	Finland; Viktor Klimenko "Aurinko laskee länteen"
1966	Monaco; Tereza Kesovija "Bien plus fort"
1966	Italy; Domenico Modugno "Dio, come ti amo"
1967	Switzerland; Géraldine "Quel cœur vas-tu briser ?"
1970	Luxembourg; David Alexandre Winter "Je suis tombé du ciel"

=== 1975–2015 ===
The first time a host nation finished with no points was in the 2015 final, when Austria's "I Am Yours" by The Makemakes scored zero. In 2003, following the United Kingdom's first zero score with "Cry Baby" by Jemini, an online poll was held by OGAE UK to gauge public opinion about each zero-point entry's worthiness of the score. "¿Quién maneja mi barca?" by Remedios Amaya (Spain 1983) won the poll as the song that least deserved a zero. "Lisa Mona Lisa" by Wilfried (Austria 1988) was determined as the song most deserving of a zero.

In 2012, although it scored in the combined voting, France's "Echo (You and I)" by Anggun would have received no points if televoting alone had been used. In that year's first semi-final, although Belgium's "Would You?" by Iris received two points in the televoting-only hypothetical results from the Albanian jury, since Albania did not use televoting. Belgium would have received no official points from televoting alone. In his book, Nul Points, Tim Moore interviews several of these performers about how their Eurovision score affected their careers.

Since the creation of a single semi-final in 2004 and expansion to two semi-finals in 2008, more than thirty countries vote in the final – even countries which have been eliminated. No points are rarer, since it requires a song to place less than tenth in every country.

Zero points from 1975 until 2015
Contest	Entry	
Contest	Semi-final(s)	Final
1978	No semi-finals	Norway; Jahn Teigen "Mil etter mil"
1981	No semi-finals	Norway; Finn Kalvik "Aldri i livet"
1982	No semi-finals	Finland; Kojo "Nuku pommiin"
1983	No semi-finals	Spain; Remedios Amaya "¿Quién maneja mi barca?"
1983	No semi-finals	Turkey; Çetin Alp and The Short Waves "Opera"
1987	No semi-finals	Turkey; Seyyal Taner and Grup Locomotif "Şarkım Sevgi Üstüne"
1988	No semi-finals	Austria; Wilfried "Lisa Mona Lisa"
1989	No semi-finals	Iceland; Daníel Ágúst "Það sem enginn sér"
1991	No semi-finals	Austria; Thomas Forstner "Venedig im Regen"
1994	No semi-finals	Lithuania; Ovidijus Vyšniauskas "Lopšinė mylimai"
1997	No semi-finals	Norway; Tor Endresen "San Francisco"
1997	No semi-finals	Portugal; Célia Lawson "Antes do adeus"
1998	No semi-finals	Switzerland; Gunvor "Lass ihn"
2003	No semi-finals	United Kingdom; Jemini "Cry Baby"
2004	Switzerland; Piero and the MusicStars "Celebrate"	
2009	Czech Republic; Gypsy.cz "Aven Romale"	
2015		Austria (host); The Makemakes "I Am Yours"
2015		Germany; Ann Sophie "Black Smoke"

=== 2016 onwards ===
With the introduction of the 2016 voting system in semi-finals and finals, scoring no points in either the jury vote or televote is possible. An overall score of zero has occurred only once, in the 2021 final.

From 2023 to 2025, only televoting was used to determine the results of the semi-finals. During this period, no points from the public were scored three times: twice in the second semi-final of the 2023 contest, and once in the first semi-final of the 2025 contest. (Note: Despite finishing with 7 points in the first semi-final in 2025, all of those points came from the Sammarinese jury, since San Marino does not organise a public vote)

Key:
† Zero points from the jury
‡ Zero points from the televote
# Zero points overall

Zero points since 2016
Contest	Entry	
Contest	Semi-final(s)	Final
2016		Czech Republic ‡ Gabriela Gunčíková "I Stand"
2017	Malta ‡ Claudia Faniello "Breathlessly"	Austria ‡ Nathan Trent "Running on Air"
2017	San Marino †; Valentina Monetta and Jimmie Wilson "Spirit of the Night"	Spain †; Manel Navarro "Do It for Your Lover"
2018	Iceland ‡ Ari Ólafsson "Our Choice"	
2019	Austria ‡ Paenda "Limits"	Germany ‡ S!sters "Sister"
2019	Austria ‡ Paenda "Limits"	Israel (host) † (Note: Due to an error in relation to the jury points from Belarus, Israel appeared to receive 12 points, all from Belarus, during the broadcast of the 2019 final. This was corrected by the EBU three days later.); Kobi Marimi "Home"
2021	Czech Republic ‡ Benny Cristo "Omaga"	United Kingdom # James Newman "Embers"
2021	Czech Republic ‡ Benny Cristo "Omaga"	Spain ‡ Blas Cantó "Voy a quedarme"
2021	Czech Republic ‡ Benny Cristo "Omaga"	Germany ‡ Jendrik "I Don't Feel Hate"
2021	Czech Republic ‡ Benny Cristo "Omaga"	Netherlands (host) ‡ Jeangu Macrooy "Birth of a New Age"
2022	Azerbaijan ‡ Nadir Rustamli "Fade to Black"	Switzerland ‡ Marius Bear "Boys Do Cry"
2022	Azerbaijan ‡ Nadir Rustamli "Fade to Black"	Germany †; Malik Harris "Rockstars"
2023	San Marino ‡ Piqued Jacks "Like an Animal"	
2023	Romania ‡ Theodor Andrei "D.G.T. (Off and On)"	
2024		United Kingdom ‡ Olly Alexander "Dizzy"
2025	Azerbaijan ‡ Mamagama "Run with U"	Iceland †; Væb "Róa"
2025	Azerbaijan ‡ Mamagama "Run with U"	Switzerland (host) ‡ Zoë Më "Voyage"
2025	Azerbaijan ‡ Mamagama "Run with U"	United Kingdom ‡ Remember Monday "What the Hell Just Happened?"
2026	Azerbaijan ‡ Jiva "Just Go"	Germany ‡ Sarah Engels "Fire"
2026	Azerbaijan ‡ Jiva "Just Go"	Belgium ‡ Essyla "Dancing on the Ice"
2026	Azerbaijan ‡ Jiva "Just Go"	United Kingdom ‡ Look Mum No Computer "Eins, Zwei, Drei"

=== Junior Eurovision ===
No entry in the Junior Eurovision Song Contest has ever received no points. Between 2005 and 2015, each contestant began with 12 points to prevent such a result. However, there has not been a situation that the 12 points received in the beginning would have remained as the sole points. The closest to that was Croatia in 2014, which ended up with 13 points after receiving a single point from San Marino.

In October 2012, a new "Kids Jury" was introduced into the voting system. The jury consists of members aged between 10 and 15, representing each of the participating countries. A spokesperson from the jury would then announce the points 1–8, 10 and the maximum 12 as decided upon by the jury members. In 2016, the Kids Jury was removed, and instead each country awarded 1–8, 10 and 12 points from both adult and kid's juries, also eliminating televoting from the contest. An expert panel was present at the 2016 contest, with each of the panelists being able to award 1–8, 10 and 12 points themselves. Since the 2017 contest, viewers worldwide have been allowed to vote online.

In 2018, Portugal and Wales received no points in the jury voting. In 2019, Portugal again received no points in the jury voting.

Zero points from the jury

Zero points in Junior Eurovision
Contest	Entry
2018	Portugal; Rita Laranjeira "Gosto de tudo (já não gosto de nada)"
2018	Wales; Manw "Perta"
2019	Portugal; Joana Almeida "Vem comigo (Come with Me)"

== Regional bloc voting ==
Although statistical analysis of the results from 2001 to 2005 suggests regional bloc voting, it is debatable how much in each case is due to ethnic diaspora voting, a sense of ethnic kinship, political alliances or a tendency for culturally-close countries to have similar musical tastes. Several countries can be categorised as voting blocs, which regularly award one another high points. The most common examples are Cyprus and Greece, Moldova and Romania, Montenegro and Serbia, and the Nordic countries.

It is still common for countries to award points to their neighbours regularly, even if they are not part of a voting bloc. For example, Finland and Estonia or Germany and Poland, Greece and Albania or Armenia and Russia. Points may also be based on a diaspora: Greece, Turkey, Poland, Lithuania, Russia and the former Yugoslav countries normally get high scores from Germany or the United Kingdom, Armenia gets points from France and Belgium, Poland from Ireland, Romania from Spain and Italy, and Albania from Switzerland, Italy and San Marino. Former Eurovision TV director Bjørn Erichsen disagreed with the assertion that regional bloc voting significantly affects the contest's outcome, saying that Russia's first victory in 2008 was only possible with points from thirty-eight of the participating countries.

A 2017 study made a complete analysis of the competition from 1957 until 2017. The voting patterns change and the previous studies restrained their analysis to a particular time window where the voting scheme is homogeneous. This approach allows the sampling comparison over arbitrary periods consistent with the unbiased assumption of voting patterns. This methodology also allows for a sliding time window to accumulate a degree of collusion over the years, producing a weighted network. The previous results are supported and the changes over time provide insight into the collusive behaviours given more or less choice.

== See also ==
- Kids Jury in the Junior Eurovision Song Contest
- Rules of the Eurovision Song Contest
