= I Love the Little Things =

1964 song by Matt Monro

Single by Matt Monro
- Released: 1964
- Songwriter: Tony Hatch

Eurovision Song Contest 1964 entry
- Country: United Kingdom
- Artist: Matt Monro
- Language: English
- Composer: Tony Hatch
- Lyricist: Tony Hatch
- Conductor: Harry Rabinowitz

Finals performance
- Final result: 2nd
- Final points: 17

Entry chronology
- ◄ "Say Wonderful Things" (1963)
- "I Belong" (1965) ►

"I Love the Little Things" is a song written by Tony Hatch and performed by Matt Monro. It represented the United Kingdom in the Eurovision Song Contest 1964.

The song was performed eighth on the night (following France's Rachel with "Le Chant de Mallory" and preceding the Germany's Nora Nova with "Man gewöhnt sich so schnell an das Schöne"). At the close of voting, it had received 17 points, placing 2nd in a field of 16.

The song deals with Monro telling his lover that he loves the little things she does and says, that he is so much in love with her that he wants to stay together forever. "When you touch me and hold me / And kiss me tenderly / I know I'm so lucky / That you came along for me".

Preceded by "Say Wonderful Things" by Ronnie Carroll	United Kingdom in the Eurovision Song Contest; 1964	Succeeded by "I Belong" by Kathy Kirby
