= Dès que le printemps revient =

1964 song by Hugues Aufray

Single by Hugues Aufray
- B-side: Allez, allez mon troupeau
- Released: 1964
- Genre: Skiffle, Chanson
- Length: 3:06
- Label: Barclay
- Composer(s): Hugues Aufray
- Lyricist(s): Jacques Plante

Hugues Aufray singles chronology
"Je reviens (Les portes de Saint-Malo)" (1964)	"Dès que le printemps revient" (1964)	"Quatres vents (Four Strong Winds)" (1964)

Eurovision Song Contest 1964 entry
- Country: Luxembourg
- Artist(s): Hugues Aufray
- Language: French
- Conductor: Jacques Denjean

Finals performance
- Final result: 4th
- Final points: 14

Entry chronology
- ◄ "À force de prier" (1963)
- "Poupée de cire, poupée de son" (1965) ►

"Dès que le printemps revient" (French pronunciation: [dɛ kə l(ə) pʁɛ̃tɑ̃ ʁəvjɛ̃]; Meaning "Once spring returns") was the Luxembourgish entry in the Eurovision Song Contest 1964, performed in French by Hugues Aufray. The song was written by Jacques Plante and composed by Aufray; Plante would later go on to compose "Chez nous", the French entry in the 1966 contest.

Aufray also recorded the song in German and Spanish, as "Das alles geht vorbei" and "La primavera llegó" respectively.

== Composition ==
The song is a folk ballad where Aufray reflects on fleeting love during spring. He conveys a yearning for a past love whose memories resurface as spring returns. Every year the onset of spring prompts the singer to again cling to this futile hope of rediscovering his old love, a hope that soon dissipates when the season ends. By the end of the song the singer is in an intense emotional struggle with the coming of spring, as the season's return evokes painful memories of his past love once more.

According to Aufray, he was originally selected by RTL to compete in the Eurovision Song Contest with a song to be written by Charles Aznavour. The song by Aznavour never materialised, at which point Aufray contacted Plante 20 days before the contest to write the song.

== At the Eurovision Song Contest ==
The song was performed first on the night, preceding the Netherlands' Anneke Grönloh with "Jij bent mijn leven". At the close of voting, it had received 14 points; Tied with the French entry "Le Chant de Mallory" by Rachel, both songs placed 4th in a field of 16.

It was succeeded as Luxembourgish representative at the 1965 contest by France Gall with "Poupée de cire, poupée de son".

== Reception ==
Aufray himself attests that the song was the breakthrough that revealed him to the public. Le Devoir's Sylvain Cormier listed the song as among Aufray's most beautiful. The single sold over 150,000 copies in France.

== Charts ==
Chart performance for "Dès que le printemps revient"
Chart (1979)	Peak position
Belgium (Ultratop 50 Wallonia)	5
France (IFOP)	3
