= Non ho l'età =

1964 song by Gigliola Cinquetti

Single by Gigliola Cinquetti

from the album Gigliola Cinquetti
- Language: Italian
- B-side: "Sei un bravo ragazzo"
- Released: 28 January 1964
- Genre: Ballad
- Length: 3:10
- Label: CGD Records
- Composer: Mario Panzeri
- Lyricist: Nicola Salerno
- Producer: Mario Panzeri

Gigliola Cinquetti singles chronology
"Non ho l'età" (1964)	"Dio, come ti amo" (1966)

Eurovision Song Contest 1964 entry
- Country: Italy
- Artist: Gigliola Cinquetti
- Language: Italian
- Composer: Mario Panzeri
- Lyricist: Nicola Salerno
- Conductor: Gianfranco Monaldi

Finals performance
- Final result: 1st
- Final points: 49

Entry chronology
- ◄ "Uno per tutte" (1963)
- "Se piangi, se ridi" (1965) ►

Official performance video
- "Non ho l'età" on YouTube

"Non ho l'età (per amarti)" (Italian for "I'm not old enough (to love you)"), usually given as just "Non ho l'età" (pronounced [non ˈɔ lleˈta]), is a song recorded by Italian singer Gigliola Cinquetti, with music composed by Mario Panzeri and lyrics by Nicola Salerno. It represented Italy in the Eurovision Song Contest 1964, held in Copenhagen, winning the contest, having previously won that year's Sanremo Music Festival.

== Background ==
=== Conception ===
"Non ho l'età" was written by composer Mario Panzeri and lyricist Nicola Salerno.

=== Sanremo ===
Between 30 January and 1 February 1964, "Non ho l'età" performed by both Gigliola Cinquetti –in Italian– and Patricia Carli –in French– competed in the 14th edition of the Sanremo Music Festival, winning the competition. As the festival was used by Radiotelevisione italiana (RAI) to select their song and performer for the 9th edition of the Eurovision Song Contest, the song became the Italian entry, and Cinquetti the performer, for Eurovision.

Cinquetti recorded the song in Italian, English –as "This is my prayer"–, Spanish –"No tengo edad"–, French –"Je suis à toi"–, German –"Luna nel blu"–, and Japanese –"Yumemiru omoi", 夢みる想い–.

=== Eurovision ===
On 21 March 1964, the Eurovision Song Contest was held at the Tivolis Koncertsal in Copenhagen hosted by Danmarks Radio (DR), and broadcast live throughout the continent. Cinquetti performed "Non ho l'età" twelfth on the night, following Portugal's "Oração" by António Calvário and preceding Yugoslavia's "Život je sklopio krug" by Sabahudin Kurt. Gianfranco Monaldi conducted the live orchestra in the performance of the Italian entry. No video recording of her performance is known to have survived, only footage of part of her winning reprise exists in addition to the audio of the full radio broadcast.

At the close of voting, the song had received 49 points, placing it first in a field of sixteen, winning the contest. Cinquetti was sixteen years old, making her the youngest Eurovision winner until the 1986 contest when Belgium's Sandra Kim won the contest with "J'aime la vie" –initially claiming to be fifteen, it was later revealed that Kim was only thirteen–. The song was followed as contest winner in 1965 by "Poupée de cire, poupée de son" by France Gall for Luxembourg. It was followed as Italian representative that year by "Se piangi, se ridi" by Bobby Solo.

=== Aftermath ===
"Non ho l'età" became a considerable commercial success for Cinquetti, in Italy, the rest of Europe, Scandinavia, and other countries worldwide.

Cinquetti later returned to compete in Eurovision at the 1974 contest, when she finished second with "Sì", behind "Waterloo" by ABBA. On 4 May 1991, she co-hosted the 1991 contest held in Rome alongside Toto Cutugno, where they performed their Eurovision winning songs, "Non ho l'età" and "Insieme: 1992" respectively, as the opening act. On 14 May 2022, in the 2022 contest held in Turin, she performed "Non ho l'età" as an interval act at the grand final.

Cinquetti was proved not to be a UK 'one-hit-wonder' when an English recording of her 1974 Eurovision entry –titled "Go"– reached #8 in the UK chart.

== Chart history ==
=== Weekly charts ===
Chart (1964–65)	Peak position
Argentina (CAPIF)	5
Belgium (Ultratop 50 Flanders)	1
Belgium (Ultratop 50 Wallonia)	1
Finland	5
France (InfoDisc)	1
Germany (Media Control AG)	3
Hong Kong	2
Italy (Musica e dischi)	1
Netherlands (Single Top 100)	2
Norway (VG-lista)	3
UK Singles (Official Charts)	17

== Legacy ==
=== Linda Scott's version ===
"This Is My Prayer"

Single by Linda Scott

from the album Hey, Look at Me Now!
- A-side: "That Old Feeling"
- Released: 1964
- Length: 2:54
- Label: Kapp Records
- Songwriter: Kaye-Springer-Nisa
- Producer: Mike Berniker

Linda Scott's recording of the song's English version, "This Is My Prayer", was released as the B-side of the single "That Old Feeling" in late 1964. In the Philippines, it topped the national chart for twelve straight weeks beginning on 12 December 1964.

=== Other covers ===
"Non ho l'età" has been recorded by a wide range of artists in other languages, for example, in Icelandic –as "Heyr mína bæn"– by Ellý Vilhjálms. Lili Ivanova, a famous Bulgarian singer, and Hong Kong singer Rebecca Pan, covered the song in 1964. Polish-Belarusian singer Wiesława Drojecka covered the song in Polish –"Nie wolno mi"–. Anneli Sari made a Finnish cover –"Liian nuori rakkauteen"–. Sandra Reemer recorded the song in Dutch –"Als jij maar wacht"–.

Preceded by "Dansevise" by Grethe and Jørgen Ingmann	Eurovision Song Contest winners 1964	Succeeded by "Poupée de cire, poupée de son" by France Gall
