= Belgium in the Eurovision Song Contest 1964 =

- Eurovision Song Contest 1964
- Participating broadcaster: Radiodiffusion-télévision belge (RTB)
- Country: Belgium
- Selection process: Internal selection
- Announcement date: January 1964

Competing entry
- Song: "Près de ma rivière"
- Artist: Robert Cogoi
- Songwriter: Robert Cogoi

Placement
- Final result: 10th, 2 points

Participation chronology

Belgium was represented at the Eurovision Song Contest 1964 with the song "Près de ma rivière", written and performed by Robert Cogoi. The Belgian participating broadcaster, French-speaking Radiodiffusion-télévision belge (RTB), internally selected its entry for the contest.

== Before Eurovision ==
=== Internal selection ===
Unlike Radiodiffusion-télévision belge (RTB)'s last four entries, they decided to internally select their entry instead of hosting a televised selection. This would be the first time a Belgian entry is chosen entirely by internal selection, and would remain the only time a Belgian entry is selected internally until 1985, and the only time a French-language entry is selected internally until 1990.

After RTB internally selected Robert Cogoi, he proposed three songs that he had composed himself. A jury consisting of Robert Cogoi, people from his record company, and representatives of RTB selected the Eurovision entry from the three submissions. "Près de ma rivière" was selected as the Belgian entry for the Eurovision Song Contest 1964. No info is known about the other two songs, but it is believed Cogoi never recorded them. The song was announced in late January 1964.

== At Eurovision ==
On the night of the final Cogoi performed 15th in the running order, following Switzerland and preceding Spain. Only an audio recording of Cogoi's performance and a couple seconds of rehearsal footage survives. Voting was by each national jury awarding 5, 3, and 1 points to their top three songs, and at the close of voting "Près de ma rivière" had received 2 points (1 each from Monaco and Portugal), placing Belgium joint 10th (with the Netherlands) of the 16 entries. The Belgian jury awarded its 5 points to runaway contest winners Italy.

The Belgian conductor at the contest was Henri Segers.

=== Voting ===
Points awarded to Belgium
Score	Country
5 points	
3 points	
1 point	Monaco; Portugal

Points awarded by Belgium
Score	Country
5 points	Italy
3 points	Monaco
1 point	Austria
