= Luxembourg in the Eurovision Song Contest 1964 =

- Eurovision Song Contest 1964
- Participating broadcaster: Compagnie Luxembourgeoise de Télédiffusion (CLT)
- Country: Luxembourg
- Selection process: Internal selection

Competing entry
- Song: "Dès que le printemps revient"
- Artist: Hugues Aufray
- Songwriters: Hugues Aufray; Jacques Plante

Placement
- Final result: 4th, 14 points

Participation chronology

Luxembourg was represented at the Eurovision Song Contest 1964 with the song "Dès que le printemps revient", with lyrics by Jacques Plante, and composed and performed by Hugues Aufray. The Luxembourgish participating broadcaster, the Compagnie Luxembourgeoise de Télédiffusion (CLT), internally selected its entry for the contest.

== Before Eurovision ==
=== Internal selection ===
Maritie and Gilbert Carpentier were responsible for choosing Luxembourg's representative for the contest. The couple eventually selected Hugues Aufray, after which they asked Charles Aznavour to compose an entry. However, a few weeks before the deadline for submissions, Aznavour said that he would be unable to do so due to touring, leaving Aufray and the broadcaster on their own. The singer then contacted his colleague, Jacques Plante. Their entry, "Dès que le printemps revient", was written in one day in Plante's office.

== At Eurovision ==
On the night of the final, Aufray performed first in the running order, preceding the Netherlands – the first of only two instances to date of a country being drawn to perform last one year and first the next. Only an audio recording of his performance is known to exist.

Although Aufray was initially against the accompaniment of a symphony orchestra, his song was ultimately conducted by Jacques Denjean. The singer was joined on stage with a banjo player, a guitarist and a bass player; all of them were part of his skiffle group.

Each participating broadcaster assembled a ten-member jury panel. Every jury could distribute 9 points in 3 different ways depending on how the jurors voted; 5, 3, and 1 points to their 3 favorite songs, 6 and 3 points to their 2 favorite songs, or 9 points to a single song. At the close of voting "Dès que le printemps revient" received a total of 14 points, placing Luxembourg joint fourth (with France) of the sixteen entries.

=== Voting ===
Points awarded to Luxembourg
Score	Country
5 points	Germany
3 points	France; Italy; Netherlands

Points awarded by Luxembourg
Score	Country
5 points	Italy
3 points	Monaco
1 point	France
