= Denmark in the Eurovision Song Contest 1964 =

- Eurovision Song Contest 1964
- Participating broadcaster: Danmarks Radio (DR)
- Country: Denmark
- Selection process: Dansk Melodi Grand Prix 1964
- Selection date: 15 February 1964

Competing entry
- Song: "Sangen om dig"
- Artist: Bjørn Tidmand
- Songwriters: Aksel V. Rasmussen; Mogens Dam

Placement
- Final result: 9th, 4 points

Participation chronology

Denmark was represented at the Eurovision Song Contest 1964 with the song "Sangen om dig", composed by Aksel V. Rasmussen, with lyrics by Mogens Dam, and performed by Bjørn Tidmand. The Danish participating broadcaster, Danmarks Radio (DR), organised the Dansk Melodi Grand Prix 1964 in order to select its entry for the contest. In addition, DR was also the host broadcaster and staged the event at the Tivolis Koncertsal in Copenhagen, after winning the previous edition with the song "Dansevise" by Grethe and Jørgen Ingmann.

== Before Eurovision ==
=== Melodi Grand Prix 1964 ===
Danmarks Radio (DR) held the Dansk Melodi Grand Prix 1964 on 15 February at the Tivoli Concert Hall in Copenhagen, hosted by Bent Fabricius-Bjerre. Nine songs took part, with the winner chosen by postcard voting. Only the top 3 placings are known, and the fact that "Sangen om dig" would seem to have gained a comprehensive victory as it received 43.8% of all votes cast (102,171 out of 233,465). Former Danish representatives Gustav Winckler, Raquel Rastenni, and Dario Campeotto were all back for another try.

Melodi Grand Prix - 15 February 1964
R/O	Artist	Song	Songwriters	Place
1	Else & Preben Oxbøl	"Mit private Grand Prix"	Ida & Bent From; Bjarne Hoyer	—N/a
2	Bjørn Tidmand	"Sangen om dig"	Mogens Dam; Aksel V. Rasmussen	1
3	Vivian & Berit	"Det er en forskel"	Peter Mynte; Sven Ulrik	2
4	Raquel Rastenni	"Vi taler samme sprog"	Otto Lington; Victor Skaarup	—N/a
5	Otto Brandenburg	"Stress"	Børge Nordlund; Ulrich Ravnbøl	—N/a
6	Grethe Mogensen	"Nattens melodi"	Eric Christiansen; Anni Weimar	—N/a
7	Gustav Winckler & Grethe Sønck	"Ugler i mosen"	Otto Francker; Sejr Volmer-Sørensen	—N/a
8	Dario Campeotto	"Shangri-la"	Sven Buemann; Vilfred Kjær	3
9	Grethe Thordal & Fredrik	"Polka i Grand Prix"	Preben Kaas; Hans Schreiber	—N/a

== At Eurovision ==
On the night of the final Tidmand performed 4th in the running order, following Norway and preceding Finland. As with all performances from the 1964 contest apart from Gigliola Cinquetti's winning reprise, only an audio recording of Tidmand's performance is known to survive. Each national jury awarded 5-3-1 to their top 3 songs and at the close of voting "Sangen om dig" had received 4 points (3 from Spain and 1 from Norway), placing Denmark 9th of the 16 entries. The Danish jury awarded its 5 points to Norway.

The members of the Danish jury were: Miss Sandfeldt-Jense (teacher from Sakskøbing), Christian Thorenfeldt (tourism promoter from Assens), Eva Hvistendahl (gymnasium student from Hobro), Tage Madsen (municipal director from Haderslev), Hans Christian Bærenholdt (painter from Helsingør), Jørn Erik Schreiner (tourism promoter from Odense), Knud Borch (contributing editor from Aarhus), Kjeld Arne Sørensen (deputy head of a logistics staff union from Copenhagen), Nete Schreiner (radio journalist) and Hanne Sommer (continuity announcer).

The contest was televised on DR TV and on radio stations DR P1 and DR P3, all with commentary by Claus Walter.

=== Voting ===
Points awarded to Denmark
Score	Country
5 points	
3 points	Spain
1 point	Norway

Points awarded by Denmark
Score	Country
5 points	Norway
3 points	Finland
1 point	Netherlands
