= Hugues Aufray =

French singer-songwriter and guitarist (born 1929)

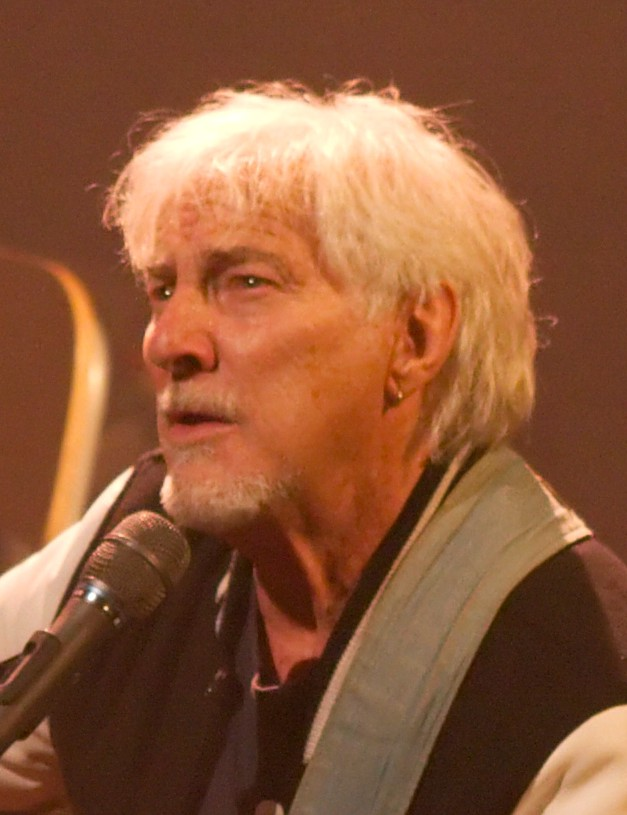
- Aufray in the French song Festival of Aix-en-Provence 2009

Background information
- Born: Hugues Jean Marie Auffray; 18 August 1929 (age 96); Neuilly-sur-Seine, Île-de-France, France
- Genres: Chanson, folk
- Occupations: Singer-songwriter and guitarist
- Instruments: Vocals, guitar
- Years active: 1959–present
- Website: huguesaufray.com

Hugues Jean Marie Auffray (French pronunciation: [yɡ ʒɑ̃ maʁi ofʁɛ]; born 18 August 1929), better known as Hugues Aufray, is a French singer-songwriter and guitarist. He is known for French-language covers of Bob Dylan's songs. Aufray knew Dylan and his work from his time in New York City, as well as from record shops, and his translations capture the rawness of the original songs.

His most famous original songs are "Santiano", "Céline", "Stewball" and "Hasta Luego".

== Early life ==
Aufray was born to Henry Auffray, an industrialist, and Amyelle de Caubios d'Andiran (1898–1992), a musician and second cousin of the French author François Mauriac (respectively by their maternal grandfather and maternal grandmother). His sister was actress Pascale Audret (1936–2000) and his niece is actress Julie Dreyfus.

Once Aufray's parents divorced, the family left Paris for Sorèze (Tarn - Occitania), where he was raised by his mother. During the war, in 1941-1945 he studied at the Dominican College in Sorèze.

In 1945, Aufray joined his father in Madrid, living there for three years. He attended the Lycée Français de Madrid in Madrid, and graduated with his baccalauréat. He then returned to France to start singing in Spanish.

== Career ==
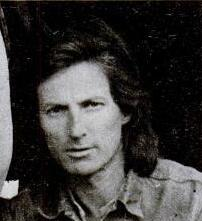
Aufray in 1973

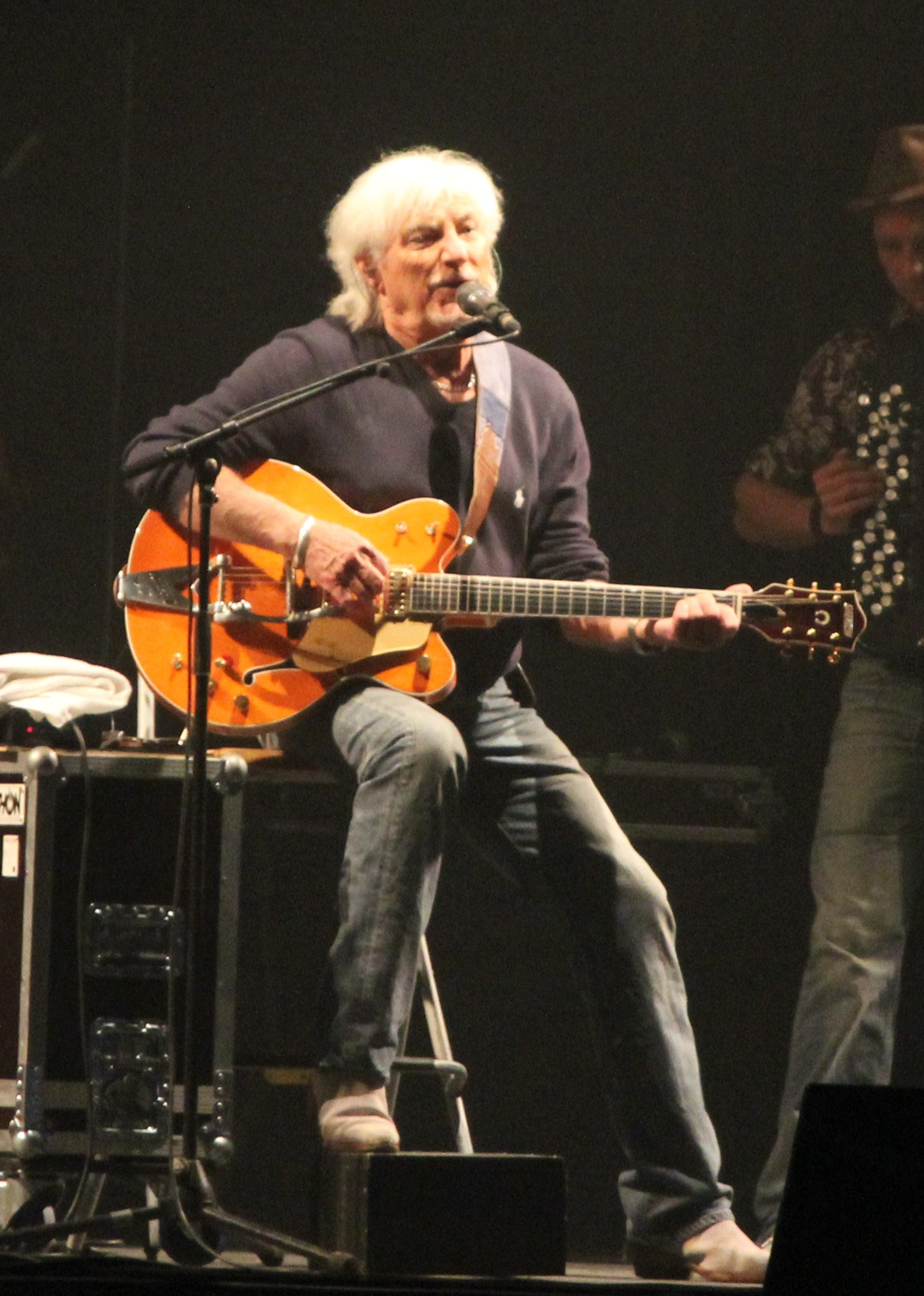
Aufray performing in 2011

Aufray first began writing songs for French singers. After finishing second in a singing competition, he signed a record deal in 1959 with Eddie Barclay.

From there, he went on to co-write and arrange many songs, drawing influence from folk, blues and rock. While supporting Peter, Paul and Mary in New York in 1962, he struck up a friendship with Bob Dylan, who would then visit him in Paris in 1964. Aufray translated many of Dylan's songs into French: their appearance on his 1965 album Aufray chante Dylan helped form the tastes of the new French generation.

Aufray represented Luxembourg in the Eurovision Song Contest 1964, performing "Dès que le printemps revient" and finishing fourth.

In 1966, he sang Les Crayons de Couleur in support of Martin Luther King Jr. at an anti-racism benefit.

In 1984, he sang a duet with Bob Dylan at a concert in Grenoble, and performed with him in Paris as well.

In 2022, he received a special prize celebrating his whole musical career, during the 63rd International Congress of the Société des Poètes et Artistes de France (Spaf), which was organized that year in Sorèze.

== Discography ==
=== Main EPs and singles ===
- Le poinçonneur des Lilas; Mes petites odalisques / Y'avait Fanny (Qui chantait); Nous avions vingt ans (1959)
- La complainte de Mackie; Le jugement dernier / La flotte américaine; Nuit d'hiver (1959)
- Nuit et jour (Liebelei); Trois hommes / San Miguel; Madeleine (1961)
- Tucumcari; Ses baisers me grisaient / La femme du Liberia; Monsieur le soleil (1961)
- Santiano; Notre rivière / Georgia; Mille rayons (1961)
- J'entends siffler le train; Les deux frères / Loin de toi; L'enfant do (1962)
- Je reviens (Les portes de Saint-Malo); Là-haut / C'est pas la peine; Oui tu verras (1963)
- Tout le long du chemin (Singing the Blues); 4 vents (Four Strong Winds) / N'y pense plus (Don't Think Twice, It's All Right); Allez allez mon troupeau (Ally, Ally Exen Free) (1964)
- À bientôt nous deux; Le bonheur n'est-il pas fait pour moi ? / Guidez mes pas; Dès que le printemps revient (1964)
- Debout les gars; Nous avions beaucoup dansé / Pends-moi; Ja-da (1964)
- Le rossignol anglais; Personne ne sait / Le coeur gros; Tu sens bon la terre (1965)
- Dou-wakadou; On est les rois (King of the Road) / Les remords et les regrets; Bambou (1965)
- L'homme-orchestre; Je croyais / Laisse-moi petite fille; Les yeux fermés (1965)
- L'épervier / Le joueur de pipeau (1966)
- Les crayons de couleur / Les tourterelles (1966)
- Céline; Les mercenaires / Stewball; Le bon Dieu s'ennuyait (1966)
- De velours noir; C'est tout bon / Petit frère; Près du coeur les blessures (1967)
- Je n'en reviens pas; Chloé / Voilà mes conditions; Vidita (1967)
- Des jonquilles aux derniers lilas; L'infidèle / Le château du hibou; Au clocher de Rouen (1968)
- La nuit est belle; Le port de Tacoma / Le petit âne gris; Chanson de la mariée (1968)
- Un mur, un ruisseau, un jardin et des fleurs; Un marin c'est bien / Je ne suis plus maître chez moi; Pauvre Benoît (1969)
- Vous ma lady / Adieu (1972)
- Ton premier chagrin d'amour / Jolie Fanny (1974)
- Cauchemar locomoteur / Le moral à zéro (1975)
- C'est plus fort que moi, j'y crois (part 1) / C'est plus fort que moi, j'y crois (part 2) (1976)
- Dernières vacances / Ballade entre chien et loup (1977)
- Émilie Émilia / Loin vers Mexico (1979)
- Bye bye Moorea Tahiti / Ma soeur la pauvresse (1983)
- Dieu que c'est dur d'être modeste / Y'a toujours un train (1984)
- Petit homme / L'enfant sauvage (1984)

=== LPs and CDs ===
- Dès que le printemps revient (1964)
- Olympia 64 (1964, live)
- Aufray chante Bob Dylan (1965)
- En direct de l'Olympia (1966, live)
- Horizon (1966)
- Je ne pourrai t'oublier tout à fait (1967)
- Hugues (1968)
- Récital - Musicorama à l'Olympia (1969, live)
- Avec amour (1970)
- Hugues Aufray and his folks (1970)
- Garlick (1972)
- Nicole (1973)
- Aquarium (1976)
- Transatlantic (1978, double LP)
- Hugues (1980)
- Caravane (1981)
- Route 82 (1982, live)
- Dieu que c'est dur d'être modeste (1985)
- Tu t'en iras... (1987)
- Céline (1990, compilation)
- La terre est si belle ! (1991)
- Concert intégral (1993, double cd)
- Little troubadour (1993)
- Aufray trans Dylan (1995, double cd)
- Au Casino de Paris (1997, double cd live)
- Chacun sa mer ! (1999)
- Aux vents solitaires (2001)
- Chante Félix Leclerc (2005)
- Plus live que jamais (2005, live)
- Hugh ! (2007)
- New Yorker - Hommage à Bob Dylan (2009, duets)
- Troubador since 1948 (2011)
- Autoportrait (2020)

== DVDs ==
- Au Casino de Paris (1977)
- Route 91, Olympia (1991)
- Hugues Aufray, plus live que jamais ! (2005)

Preceded by Nana Mouskouri	Luxembourg in the Eurovision Song Contest; 1964	Succeeded by France Gall
