= Portugal in the Eurovision Song Contest 1964 =

- Eurovision Song Contest 1964
- Participating broadcaster: Radiotelevisão Portuguesa (RTP)
- Country: Portugal
- Selection process: Grande Prémio TV da Canção Portuguesa 1964
- Selection date: 2 February 1964

Competing entry
- Song: "Oração"
- Artist: António Calvário
- Songwriters: João Nobre; Francisco Nicholson; Rogério Bracinha

Placement
- Final result: 13th, 0 points

Participation chronology

Portugal was represented at the Eurovision Song Contest 1964 with the song "Oração", composed by João Nobre, with lyrics by Francisco Nicholson and Rogério Bracinha, and performed by António Calvário. The Portuguese participating broadcaster, Radiotelevisão Portuguesa (RTP), selected its entry for the contest at the Grande Prémio TV da Canção Portuguesa 1964. This was the first-ever entry from Portugal in the Eurovision Song Contest, and the first-ever entry performed in Portuguese in the contest.

== Before Eurovision ==
=== Grande Prémio TV da Canção Portuguesa 1964 ===
The logo

Radiotelevisão Portuguesa (RTP) held the Grande Prémio TV da Canção Portuguesa 1964 on 2 February 1964 at 22:25 UTC in its Lumiar studios in Lisbon, hosted by Maria Helena Fialho Gouveia and Henrique Mendes. Twelve songs took part in the final and each artist sung two songs. Armando Tavares Belo conducted all the songs. The winning song was chosen by a distrital jury, composed by three members, each had 5 votes to be distributed among the songs it intended to award, making a total of 15 votes per district.

Final – 2 February 1964
R/O	Artist	Song	Votes	Place
1	António Calvário	"Oração"	79	1
2	Artur Garcia	"Foi sonho"	0	10
3	Madalena Iglésias	"Na tua carta"	0	10
4	Simone de Oliveira	"Olhos nos olhos"	53	3
5	Gina Maria	"Tirano Gentil"	6	7
6	Artur Garcia	"Finalmente"	2	8
7	Guilherme Kjölner	"Manhã"	31	4
8	Simone de Oliveira	"Amar é ressurgir"	2	8
9	Gina Maria	"Minha luz brilhou"	0	10
10	António Calvário	"Para cantar Portugal"	11	6
11	Guilherme Kjölner	"Lindo par"	56	2
12	Madalena Iglésias	"Balada das palavras perdidas"	30	5

Detailed Distrital Jury Votes
R/O	Song	Aveiro	Beja	Braga	Bragança	Castelo Branco	Coimbra	Évora	Faro	Guarda	Leiria	Lisbon	Portalegre	Porto	Santarém	Setúbal	Viana do Castelo	Vila Real	Viseu	Total
1	"Oração"	1	1	2	5	5	2	7	9	8	1	1	2	5	3	6	9	10	2	79
2	"Foi sonho"																			0
3	"Na tua carta"																			0
4	"Olhos nos olhos"	5		1	1	3		1		3	14	6	3	1	2	4		1	8	53
5	"Tirano Gentil"		1		2				1			1			1					6
6	"Finalmente"											1							1	2
7	"Manhã"		1	4	1	3		1	2	3		1	3	2	1	5	3		1	31
8	"Amar é ressurgir"					1									1					2
9	"Minha luz brilhou"																			0
10	"Para cantar Portugal"		1	5	3		1								1					11
11	"Lindo par"	8	3	3	1	3	12	6	3	1		4	3	1	4		3	1		56
12	"Balada das palavras perdidas"	1	8		2							1	4	6	2			3	3	30

== At Eurovision ==
The contest was broadcast on RTP.

On the night of the final Calvário performed 11th in the running order, following the Monaco and preceding Italy. Only an audio recording of Calvário's performance is known to exist. Voting was by each national jury awarding 5-3-1 to their top 3 songs, and at the close "Oração" was one of four songs (along with the entries from Germany, Switzerland, and Yugoslavia) which had failed to pick up a single point. This was the third consecutive contest in which four countries had failed to score, and a first time a country debuts with nul-points. The Portuguese jury awarded its 5 points to Italy.

The orchestra during the Portuguese entry was conducted by Kai Mortensen.

=== Voting ===
RTP assembled a jury panel with ten members, with each member giving votes to their favorite song. The following members comprised the Portuguese jury.

- Leonardo Cardoso Junior (telephone company employee)
- António Santiago da Cunha Coelho (insurance professional)
- Eduardo Diamantino Faria (journalist)
- Rui Palar (writer)
- José Neves de Sousa (publicist)
- Maria João Penha (teacher)
- Maria de La Salette Pinheiro Basílio Mota de Magalhães (head nurse)
- Alvaro Lereno de Sousa Pinto (office worker)
- Fernando Lima (dancer)
- Rui Manel Afonso Baptista (teacher)

==== Points awarded to Portugal ====
Portugal did not receive any points at the 1964 Eurovision Song Contest.

Points awarded by Portugal
Score	Country
5 points	Italy
3 points	France
1 point	Belgium
