= Eurovision Song Contest 1964 =

International song competition

Coordinates: 55°40′25″N 12°34′06″E

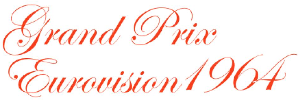

Date and venue
- Final: 21 March 1964
- Venue: Tivolis Koncertsal; Copenhagen, Denmark

Organisation
- Organiser: European Broadcasting Union (EBU)
- Scrutineer: Miroslav Vilček

Production
- Host broadcaster: Danmarks Radio (DR)
- Director: Poul Leth Sørensen
- Musical director: Kai Mortensen
- Presenter: Lotte Wæver

Participants
- Number of entries: 16
- Debuting countries: Portugal
- Non-returning countries: Sweden
- Participation map: Competing countries Countries that participated in the past but not in 1964

Vote
- Voting system: Each country awarded 5, 3 and 1 points (or combinations thereof) to their three favourite songs
- Winning song: Italy "Non ho l'età"

The Eurovision Song Contest 1964 was the 9th edition of the Eurovision Song Contest, held on 21 March 1964 at Tivolis Koncertsal in Copenhagen, Denmark, and presented by Lotte Wæver. It was organised by the European Broadcasting Union (EBU) and host broadcaster Danmarks Radio (DR), who staged the event after winning the 1963 contest for Denmark with the song "Dansevise" by Grethe and Jørgen Ingmann.

Broadcasters from sixteen countries participated in the contest. Portugal made its debut this year, whereas Sweden decided not to enter.

The winner was Italy with the song "Non ho l'età", performed by Gigliola Cinquetti, written by Nicola Salerno and composed by Mario Panzeri. At the age of 16 years and 92 days, Gigliola Cinquetti became the youngest winner of the contest yet; a record she held until 1986. The entry had one of the widest margins of victory ever witnessed in the competition, managing to garner almost three times as many points as the runner-up song. The United Kingdom, Monaco, Luxembourg and France rounded out the top five. Besides the 1956 contest, the 1964 contest is the only other one of which there are no complete surviving video recordings, with the exception of the winner's reprise performance.

== Location ==
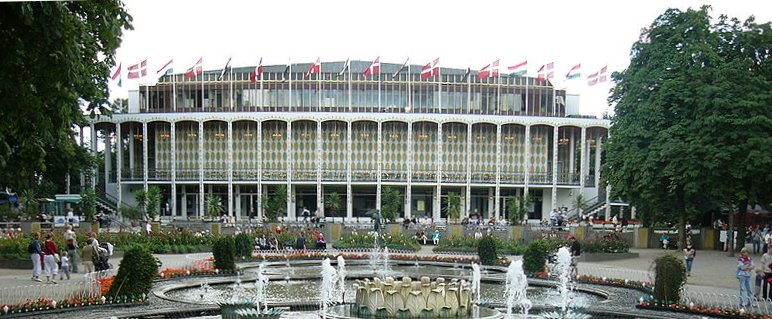
Tivolis Koncertsal, Copenhagen - host venue of the 1964 contest.

Danmarks Radio (DR) staged the 1964 contest in Copenhagen, after winning the 1963 contest for Denmark with the song "Dansevise" by Grethe and Jørgen Ingmann. The venue selected was Tivolis Koncertsal (Tivoli Concert Hall), which lies within the amusement park and pleasure garden Tivoli Gardens. The park, alluding by its name to the Jardin de Tivoli that existed in Paris, was opened on 15 August 1843, and is the second oldest amusement park in the world, after Dyrehavsbakken in nearby Klampenborg. At the night of the contest, 800 spectators followed the show in the audience.

== Participants ==
Eurovision Song Contest 1964 – Participation summaries by country
- Austria; Belgium; Denmark; Finland; France; Germany; Italy; Luxembourg; Monaco; Netherlands; Norway; Portugal; Spain; Switzerland; United Kingdom; Yugoslavia

Broadcasters from sixteen countries participated in the 1964 contest. Of the sixteen countries that participated in 1963 only Sweden was absent. Sveriges Radio (SR) did not participate due to a strike among members of the Swedish Union for Performing Arts and Film (Swedish: Teaterförbundet). Portugal was represented in the contest for the first time, however it became the first country to score nul points on its début entry. Germany, Switzerland, and Yugoslavia also scored nul points for the first time. The Netherlands became the first country to be represented by a singer of non-European ancestry, Anneke Grönloh who was of Indonesian descent. Spain was represented by the Italian-Uruguayan group Los TNT who were the first group of three or more participants in the history of the contest.

Only one of the performing artists had previously competed representing the same country in past editions: Anita Traversi had represented Switzerland in 1960, and had also provided backing vocals for Switzerland in 1956.

Eurovision Song Contest 1964 participants
Country	Broadcaster	Artist	Song	Language	Songwriter(s)	Conductor
Austria	ORF	Udo Jürgens	"Warum nur, warum?"	German	Udo Jürgens	Johannes Fehring
Belgium	RTB	Robert Cogoi	"Près de ma rivière"	French	Robert Cogoi	Henri Segers
Denmark	DR	Bjørn Tidmand	"Sangen om dig"	Danish	Mogens Dam; Aksel V. Rasmussen	Kai Mortensen
Finland	YLE	Lasse Mårtenson	"Laiskotellen"	Finnish	Lasse Mårtenson; Sauvo Puhtila	George de Godzinsky
France	RTF	Rachel	"Le Chant de Mallory"	French	Pierre Cour; André Popp	Franck Pourcel
Germany	HR (Note: On behalf of the German public broadcasting consortium ARD)	Nora Nova	"Man gewöhnt sich so schnell an das Schöne"	German	Rudi von der Dovenmühle; Nils Nobach	Willy Berking
Italy	RAI	Gigliola Cinquetti	"Non ho l'età"	Italian	Mario Panzeri; Nicola Salerno	Gianfranco Monaldi
Luxembourg	CLT	Hugues Aufray	"Dès que le printemps revient"	French	Hugues Aufray; Jacques Plante	Jacques Denjean
Monaco	TMC	Romuald	"Où sont-elles passées ?"	French	Pierre Barouh; Francis Lai	Michel Colombier
Netherlands	NTS	Anneke Grönloh	"Jij bent mijn leven"	Dutch	Ted Powder; René de Vos	Dolf van der Linden
Norway	NRK	Arne Bendiksen	"Spiral"	Norwegian	Egil Hagen; Sigurd Jansen	Karsten Andersen
Portugal	RTP	António Calvário	"Oração"	Portuguese	Rogério Braçinha; João Nobre; Francisco Nicholson	Kai Mortensen
Spain	TVE	Nelly with Tim and Tony	"Caracola"	Spanish	Fina de Calderón	Rafael Ibarbia
Switzerland	SRG SSR	Anita Traversi	"I miei pensieri"	Italian	Sanzio Chiesa; Giovanni Pelli	Fernando Paggi
United Kingdom	BBC	Matt Monro	"I Love the Little Things"	English	Tony Hatch	Harry Rabinowitz
Yugoslavia	JRT	Sabahudin Kurt	"Život je sklopio krug" (Живот је склопио круг)	Serbo-Croatian	Srđan Matijević; Stevan Raičković	Radivoje Spasić

== Format ==
Poul Leth Sørensen served as producer, Bent Fabricius Bjerre and Marianne Drewes acted as co-producers.

The prize to be awarded to the winning artist took the form of an engraved medallion made of silver.

The event was covered by around 100 journalists and photographers. The artists were accompanied by a 41-piece orchestra. Rehearsals started on 19 March 1964.

== Contest overview ==
Portugal's António Calvário, pictured performing his song at the contest

Italy's Gigliola Cinquetti, the overall winner, pictured performing her song at the contest

The participants, pictured during the aftershow party. Back row, left to right: France's Rachel, Switzerland's Anita Traversi, Norway's Arne Bendiksen, Yugoslavia's Sabahudin Kurt, the United Kingdom's Matt Monro, Denmark's Bjørn Tidmand, Belgium's Robert Cogoi; middle row: Finland's Lasse Mårtenson, Germany's Nora Nova, Austria's Udo Jürgens, Italy's Gigliola Cinquetti, Luxembourg's Hugues Aufray, Portugal's António Calvário; front: Svend Pedersen; absent: Monaco's Romuald, Spain's Nelly with Tim and Tony, the Netherlands' Anneke Grönloh.

The contest was held on 21 March 1964, beginning at 22:00 CET (21:00 UTC).

A political protest occurred after the Swiss entry: an anonymous man trespassed onto the stage holding a banner that read "Boycot [sic] Franco & Salazar". Whilst this was going on, television viewers were shown a shot of the scoreboard; once the man was removed by a television technician, the contest went on.

The interval act consisted of a ballet dance performance by dancers Solveig Østergaard, Niels Kehlet, Inge Olafsen and Mette Hønningen from the Royal Danish Ballet, choreographed by Niels Bjørn Larsen, and over the music of the "Columbine porka mazurka" and the "Champagne Galop" by Hans Christian Lumbye.

The immediate response of the Koncertsal audience to the Italian entry was markedly enthusiastic and prolonged and, most unusually for a contest performance, after leaving the stage Gigliola Cinquetti was allowed to return to take a second bow. Her performance was given an unscheduled repeat on British television the following afternoon. In the event, she won the most crushing victory in the history of the contest, with a score almost three times that of her nearest rival, a feat extremely unlikely ever to be beaten under the post-1974 scoring system.

An aftershow party was held for the participating delegations at the restaurant Ambassadeur in Copenhagen. Each of the 16 participating acts was awarded a silver trophy on this occasion.

Results of the Eurovision Song Contest 1964
R/O	Country	Artist	Song	Points	Place
1	Luxembourg	Hugues Aufray	"Dès que le printemps revient"	14	4
2	Netherlands	Anneke Grönloh	"Jij bent mijn leven"	2	10
3	Norway	Arne Bendiksen	"Spiral"	6	8
4	Denmark	Bjørn Tidmand	"Sangen om dig"	4	9
5	Finland	Lasse Mårtenson	"Laiskotellen"	9	7
6	Austria	Udo Jürgens	"Warum nur, warum?"	11	6
7	France	Rachel	"Le Chant de Mallory"	14	4
8	United Kingdom	Matt Monro	"I Love the Little Things"	17	2
9	Germany	Nora Nova	"Man gewöhnt sich so schnell an das Schöne"	0	13
10	Monaco	Romuald	"Où sont-elles passées ?"	15	3
11	Portugal	António Calvário	"Oração"	0	13
12	Italy	Gigliola Cinquetti	"Non ho l'età"	49	1
13	Yugoslavia	Sabahudin Kurt	"Život je sklopio krug"	0	13
14	Switzerland	Anita Traversi	"I miei pensieri"	0	13
15	Belgium	Robert Cogoi	"Près de ma rivière"	2	10
16	Spain	Nelly with Tim and Tony	"Caracola"	1	12

=== Spokespersons ===
Each participating broadcaster appointed a spokesperson who was responsible for announcing the votes for its respective country via telephone. Known spokespersons at the 1964 contest are listed below.

- Finland – Poppe Berg

== Detailed voting results ==
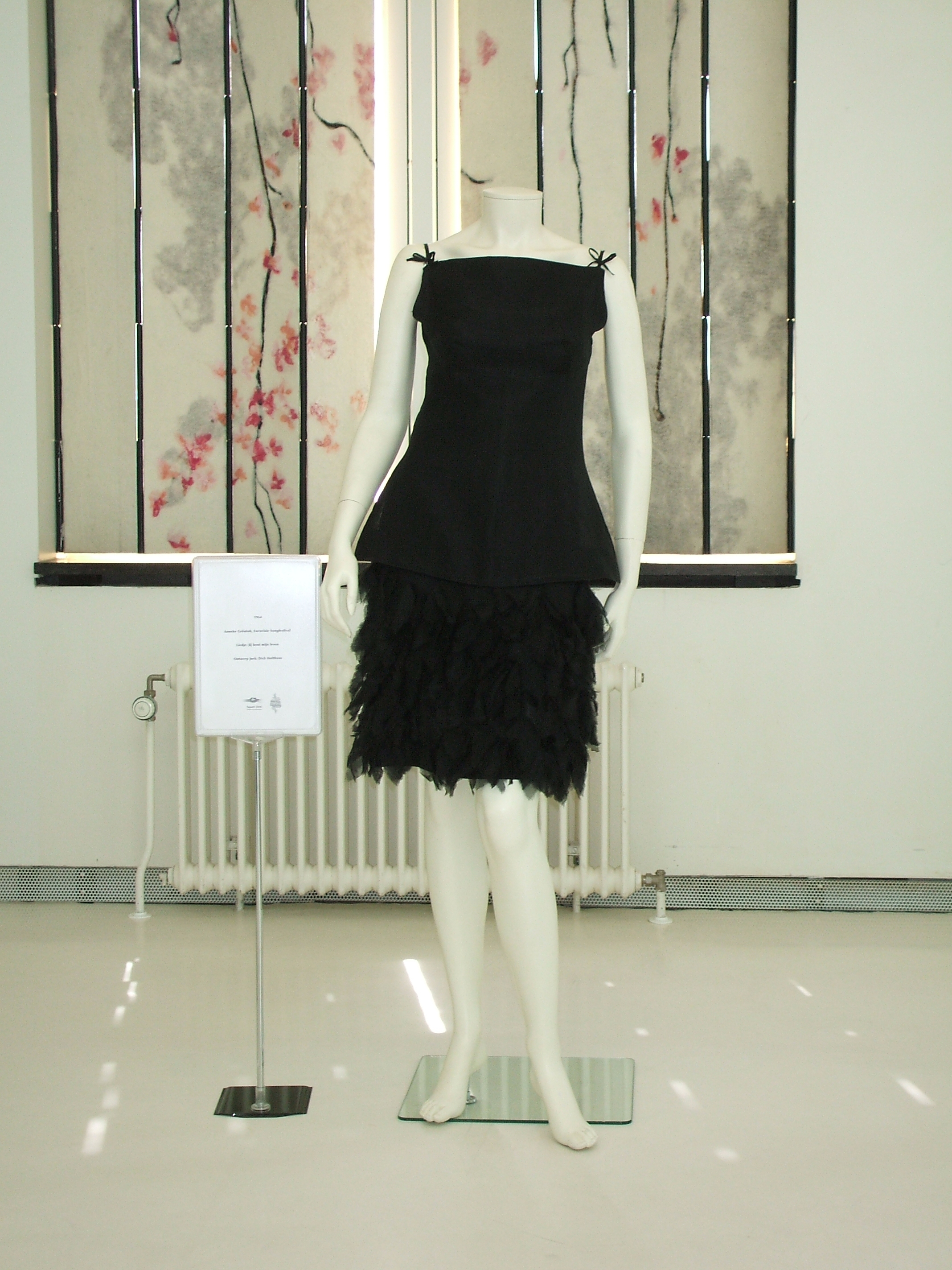
Dutch contestant Anneke Grönloh's dress

Each participating broadcaster assembled a 10-member jury panel who distributed three points among their one, two, or three favourite songs. The points were totaled and the first, second, and third placed songs were awarded 5, 3, and 1 votes in order. If only one song got every point within the jury it would get all 9 points. If only two songs were chosen, the songs would get 6 and 3 points in order.

Detailed voting results
		Total score	Luxembourg	Netherlands	Norway	Denmark	Finland	Austria	France	United Kingdom	Germany	Monaco	Portugal	Italy	Yugoslavia	Switzerland	Belgium	Spain
Contestants	Luxembourg	14		3					3		5			3				
Contestants	Netherlands	2				1				1								
Contestants	Norway	6				5	1											
Contestants	Denmark	4			1													3
Contestants	Finland	9			3	3				3								
Contestants	Austria	11												5			1	5
Contestants	France	14	1					3				5	3		1			1
Contestants	United Kingdom	17		1	5		3	1	1		1					5		
Contestants	Germany	0																
Contestants	Monaco	15	3						5						3	1	3	
Contestants	Portugal	0																
Contestants	Italy	49	5	5			5	5		5	3	3	5		5	3	5	
Contestants	Yugoslavia	0																
Contestants	Switzerland	0																
Contestants	Belgium	2										1	1					
Contestants	Spain	1												1				

=== 5 points ===
Below is a summary of all 5 points in the final:

N.	Contestant	Nation(s) giving 5 points
8	Italy	Austria, Belgium, Finland, Luxembourg, Netherlands, Portugal, United Kingdom, Yugoslavia
2	Austria	Italy, Spain
2	United Kingdom	Norway, Switzerland
1	France	Monaco
1	Luxembourg	Germany
1	Monaco	France
1	Norway	Denmark

== Broadcasts ==
Each participating broadcaster was required to relay the contest via its networks. Non-participating EBU member broadcasters were also able to relay the contest as "passive participants". Broadcasters were able to send commentators to provide coverage of the contest in their own native language and to relay information about the artists and songs to their television viewers. No official accounts of the viewing figures are known to exist. Estimates given in the press ranged from 100 to 150 million viewers.

Known details on the broadcasts in each country, including the specific broadcasting stations and commentators are shown in the tables below.

Broadcasters and commentators in participating countries
Country	Broadcaster	Channel(s)	Commentator(s)	Ref(s)
Austria	ORF	ORF		
Belgium	RTB	RTB		
Belgium	BRT	BRT		
Denmark	DR	DR TV, DR P1, DR P3	Claus Walter	
Finland	YLE	Suomen Televisio	Aarno Walli	
Finland	YLE	Yleisohjelma	Erkki Melakoski	
Finland	YLE	Ruotsinkielinen ula-ohjelma		
France	RTF	RTF, Inter Jeunesse	Robert Beauvais	
Germany	ARD	Deutsches Fernsehen	Hermann Rockmann	
Italy	RAI	Programma Nazionale TV	Renato Tagliani	
Luxembourg	CLT	Télé-Luxembourg	Robert Beauvais	
Monaco	Télé Monte-Carlo		Robert Beauvais	
Netherlands	NTS	NTS	Ageeth Scherphuis	
Netherlands	VARA	Hilversum 2		
Norway	NRK	NRK Fjernsynet, NRK	Odd Grythe	
Portugal	RTP	RTP		
Spain	TVE	TVE	Federico Gallo	
Spain	RNE	RNE (Note: Deferred broadcast at 23:00 (CET))		
Switzerland	SRG SSR	TV DRS		
Switzerland	SRG SSR	TSR	Robert Burnier	
Switzerland	SRG SSR	TSI		
Switzerland	SRG SSR	Radio Beromünster (Note: Delayed broadcast on 23 March at 20:00 (CET))		
Switzerland	SRG SSR	Radio Sottens		
Switzerland	SRG SSR	Radio Monte Ceneri		
United Kingdom	BBC	BBC TV	David Jacobs	
Yugoslavia	JRT	Televizija Beograd		
Yugoslavia	JRT	Televizija Ljubljana		
Yugoslavia	JRT	Televizija Zagreb		

Broadcasters and commentators in non-participating countries
Country	Broadcaster	Channel(s)	Commentator(s)	Ref(s)
Ireland	RÉ	Telefís Éireann		
Malta	MBA	MTV	Victor Aquilina	
Netherlands Antilles	ATM	TeleCuraçao (Note: Delayed broadcast on 20 May 1964 at 21:15 (ADT))		
Sweden	SR	Sveriges TV	Sven Lindahl	

=== Lost recordings ===
As with the 1956 contest, no complete video recording of the actual contest is known to have survived. Some clips of the contest have survived, including the winning announcement by Svend Pedersen, and part of Gigliola Cinquetti's reprise. For some time, there was a rumour that a copy of the entire contest existed in the French television archives. In 2021, INA confirmed to Wiwibloggs that the French television archives do not possess a video copy of the contest. However, the audio of a French radio broadcast can be found in the archives of INA.

A persistent myth, even repeated on the official Eurovision site, is that the tape was destroyed in a fire in the 1970s. In a 2019 retrospective article, DR claimed that the broadcast was never recorded in the first place, allegedly due to no tape machines being available at the studio at the time. The audio of most of the show, however, is still available online, without the last few minutes, and short video clips and photos from various archives also remain available. In 2026, the Eurovision Song Contest's YouTube channel published Cinquetti's reprise performance, which was edited from discovered segments of footage from the show.
