= André Popp =

French composer (1924–2014)

- Born: André Charles Jean Popp; 19 February 1924; Fontenay-le-Comte, France
- Died: 10 May 2014 (aged 90); Puteaux, France
- Occupations: Composer; conductor; orchestrator; arranger
- Years active: 1950s-2014

André Charles Jean Popp (19 February 1924 – 10 May 2014) was a French composer, arranger and screenwriter.

== Biography ==
Popp was born into a family of German-Dutch background, in Fontenay-le-Comte, Vendée. He started his career as a church organist, filling the place of the abbot who had been called up to serve in World War II in 1939. Popp studied music at the Saint Joseph Institute. In the 1950s he worked for the French radio station RTF, composing music for the Club d'Essai and, from 1953 to 1960, La Bride sur le cou. He orchestrated a number of Juliette Gréco albums in the late 1950s and early 1960s. In the 1960s, he co-wrote, with Pierre Cour, three songs for the Eurovision Song Contest: "Tom Pillibi", which won the competition for France when it was sung by 18-year-old newcomer Jacqueline Boyer in 1960, "Le Chant de Mallory", the 1964 French entry, performed by another newcomer, Rachel, and "L'amour est bleu" (Love is Blue) which came fourth for Luxembourg in 1967, but which later became a number-one hit instrumental in the US for Paul Mauriat.

Popp is the composer of Piccolo, Saxo et Compagnie, to a text by Jean Broussolle, a musical tale for children intended as a guide to the instruments of the orchestra and the rudiments of harmony.

In 1957, Popp released Delirium in Hi-Fi (originally titled Elsa Popping et sa musique sidérante), a collaboration with Pierre Fatosme, an experiment in the recording techniques of the time.

Popp is the author of the pop song "Manchester et Liverpool" sung by Marie Laforêt. Its melody gained fame in the former Soviet Union as the background music to the Vremya television news programme's weather forecast since the early 1970s.

During the 1950s, Popp created unique space-age instrumental recordings and by the early 1960s had built a strong reputation in the music recording industry, becoming a sought-after arranger. He crafted orchestrations for Rive Gauche legend Juliette Gréco that were jazzy, urbane, vibrant, quirky, and occasionally cartoonish. The arrival of rock and roll in France and, consequentially, yé-yé music, dramatically changed the expectations of French audiences and record buyers, especially the younger ones, who were more interested in singers like Johnny Hallyday than Jacques Brel, although chansonniers such as Brel ultimately remained just as popular as they had been in the 1950s.

Popp had to adapt to these new trends. He worked almost exclusively with female singers during this period, preferably the Lolita types, such as Chantal Goya, but also with Françoise Hardy. "Love is Blue", a song Vicky Leandros performed at the Eurovision Song Contest 1967 on behalf of Luxembourg, also recorded by Claudine Longet, became internationally popular. In these recordings, Popp does not sacrifice the sophistication of his 1950s orchestrations, but rather than animate the songs, he seems to set the tone, the mood, painting a colorful picture. Sometimes there are silky, smooth strings; often there is harpsichord and oboe and flute; elsewhere adventurous brassy fanfares; occasionally an ethereal soprano chorus; always some magical musical final touch, like the faint, quavering harmonica in "Manchester et Liverpool". Marie Laforêt's voice fit perfectly in André Popp's 1960s soundscapes and he created more of them for her than for her contemporaries.

Popp died at his apartment in the Paris suburb of Puteaux on 10 May 2014, the very day that his last interview, with Benoît Duteurtre, was broadcast on France Musique.

== Discography ==
- André Popp présente Elsa Popping et sa musique sidérante. Fredo Minablos, Marie-Jeanne Popp, vocals; André Popp and his orchestra; Pierre Fatosme, sound effects. LP recording, 1 disc: analog, 33 1/3 rpm, monaural, 12 in (300 mm) Fontana 680201. N.p.: Fontana, 1957. Reissued on CD, Basta 30–90312. [Aalsmeer, the Netherlands]: Basta, 1996; Japanese reissue, CD recording, MSI MSIG-0032 Tokyo: MSI, 2003.
- Delirium in Hi-Fi. Adventures in Sound. LP recording, 1 disc: analog, 33 1/3 rpm, monaural, 12 in (300 mm) Columbia WL 106. New York: Columbia Records, 1955.
- The Adventures of Piccolo, Saxie and Company/Passport for Piccolo, Saxie and Company. Narrated by Victor Borge; orchestra conducted by the André Popp. Columbia Masterlength Stories. LP recording, 1 disc: analog, 33 1/3 rpm, monaural, 12 in (300 mm) Columbia CL 1233. New York: Columbia Records, 1959.
- Popped!
- Andre Popp et son orchestre
- Why Say Goodbye
- La musique qui fait Popp. Het Metropole Orkest; Jan Stulen, conductor. LP recording, 1 disc: analog, 33 1/3 rpm, monaural, 12 in (300 mm) Fontana 660008TR. [Paris]: Fontana, 1958. Reissued on CD, Basta 30–9057–2. [Aalsmeer, the Netherlands]: Basta, 1993.
- Die neuen Abenteuer von Piccolo, Sax & Co.
- Popp Musique
- La Symphonique Ecologique
