= Norway in the Eurovision Song Contest 1964 =

- Eurovision Song Contest 1964
- Participating broadcaster: Norsk rikskringkasting (NRK)
- Country: Norway
- Selection process: Melodi Grand Prix 1964
- Selection date: 15 February 1964

Competing entry
- Song: "Spiral"
- Artist: Arne Bendiksen
- Songwriters: Sigurd Jansen; Egil Hagen

Placement
- Final result: 8th, 6 points

Participation chronology

Norway was represented at the Eurovision Song Contest 1964 with the song "Spiral", composed by Sigurd Jansen, with lyrics by Egil Hagen, and performed by Arne Bendiksen. The Norwegian participating broadcaster, Norsk rikskringkasting (NRK), organised the national final Melodi Grand Prix 1964 in order to select its entry for the contest.

== Before Eurovision ==
=== Melodi Grand Prix 1964 ===
Norsk rikskringkasting (NRK) held the Melodi Grand Prix 1964 at its studios in Oslo, hosted by Odd Grythe. Five songs took part in the final with each song sung twice by different singers, once with a small combo and once with a full orchestra. The winning song was chosen by an "expert" jury.

MGP - 15 February 1964
R/O	Artist 1 (Combo)	Artist 2 (Orchestra)	Song	Points	Place
1	Elisabeth Granneman	Arne Bendiksen	"Spiral"	61	1
2	Jan Høiland	Inger Jacobsen	"Hvor"	52	4
3	Wenche Myhre	Elisabeth Granneman	"God gammel firkantet vals"	60	2
4	Odd Børre & The Cannons	Wenche Myhre	"La meg værre ung"	57	3
5	Inger Jacobsen	Jan Høiland	"Ingen sol finner vei (til min gate)"	38	5

== At Eurovision ==
On the night of the final Bendiksen performed third in the running order, following the Netherlands and preceding Denmark. Each national jury awarded 5-3-1 to their top three songs, and at the close "Spiral" had picked up 6 points (5 from Denmark and 1 from Finland), placing Norway 8th of the 16 entries. The Norwegian jury awarded its 5 points to the United Kingdom.

=== Voting ===
Points awarded to Norway
Score	Country
5 points	Denmark
3 points	
1 point	Finland

Points awarded by Norway
Score	Country
5 points	United Kingdom
3 points	Finland
1 point	Denmark
