= Céline (song) =

1966 song by Hugues Aufray

Single by Hugues Aufray
- A-side: "Céline" "Les mercenaires"
- B-side: "Stewball" "Le bon Dieu s'ennuyait"
- Released: 1966
- Genre: Chanson
- Length: 3:05
- Label: Barclay
- Composer: Mort Shuman
- Lyricists: Hugues Aufray; Vline Buggy

Hugues Aufray singles chronology
"Il faut ranger ta poupée" (1966)	"Céline" (1966)	"Le jour ou le bateau viendra" / "Dieu est a nos cotés" (1966)

"Céline" is a 1966 song recorded by French singer Hugues Aufray. It was composed by Mort Shuman and written by the performer himself and Vline Buggy.

== Reception ==
The single sold over 200,000 copies in France. Due to the success of the song, the name Céline became popular, and Celine Dion, born in 1968, was named after the song.

== Charts ==
Chart performance for "Céline"
Chart (1966)	Peak position
Belgium (Ultratop 50 Wallonia)	1
France (IFOP)	2
