= Warum nur, warum? =

Song by Udo Jürgens

Single by Udo Jürgens
- Language: German
- Released: 1964
- Songwriter: Udo Jürgens

Eurovision Song Contest 1964 entry
- Country: Austria
- Artist: Udo Jürgens
- Language: German
- Composer: Udo Jürgens
- Lyricist: Udo Jürgens
- Conductor: Johannes Fehring

Finals performance
- Final result: 6th
- Final points: 11

Entry chronology
- ◄ "Vielleicht geschieht ein Wunder" (1963)
- "Sag ihr, ich lass sie grüßen" (1965) ►

"Warum nur, warum?" (German pronunciation: [ˈvaːrʊm nuːɐ̯ vaˈrʊm]; "Just why, why?") is a song written and performed by Udo Jürgens. It represented Austria in the Eurovision Song Contest 1964. The song was performed sixth on the night (following Finland's Lasse Mårtenson with "Laiskotellen" and preceding France's Rachel with "Le Chant de Mallory"). At the close of voting, it had received 11 points, placing sixth in a field of 16.

== Background ==
The song is in the chanson style and features Jürgens wondering why bad things need to happen, such as flowers dying and the object of his affections ignoring him.

The song was recorded in English (first by Matt Monro, with later versions by Brenda Lee with Richard Williams, Peter Grant, Al Martino, Nancy Wilson and Timi Yuro among others), in Italian and in Spanish as "Vete por favor" by Matt Monro, on each occasion featuring similar sentiments.

Following the contest, United Kingdom representative Matt Monro had a hit with his English-language version of "Warum nur, warum?", entitled "Walk Away" (lyrics by Don Black, with whom Monro attended the Eurovision contest). Monro came second in the 1964 Eurovision Song Contest with the Tony Hatch song, "I Love the Little Things".

"Warum nur, warum?" was succeeded as the Austrian entry in the Eurovision Song Contest 1965 by "Sag ihr, ich lass sie grüßen" ("Tell her, I send my love"), also performed by Jürgens.

== Chart performance ==
=== Matt Monro version ===
Chart (1964–65)	Peak position
UK Singles (Official Charts Company)	4
US Billboard Middle-Road Singles	5
US Billboard Hot 100	23
