= Lotte Wæver =

Danish actress and television presenter

- Born: 17 February 1942 (age 84); Denmark
- Occupations: Actress, television presenter
- Known for: Presenting the Eurovision Song Contest in 1964

Lotte Wæver (born 17 February 1942) is a Danish former actress and television presenter. She is best known for hosting the Eurovision Song Contest in 1964.

== Career ==
=== Television ===
During her time in university, Wæver worked as one of the first female continuity announcers in Danmarks Radio (DR).

She is best known for presenting the Eurovision Song Contest in Copenhagen in 1964, a position for which she says she was chosen over her peers because of her willingness to do it.

The contest was famously overshadowed by a political protest from a man who trespassed onto the stage holding a banner reading "Boycott Franco and Salazar". In an interview in 2001, Wæver revealed that while she was visibly shaken by the protester, the incident did not affect her in the slightest because, as the presenter of the contest, when the light above the camera was on, her attention was focused on the camera.

Commenting on the significance of presenting the largest event hosted by DR at the time, she was nostalgic when thinking how primitive and technologically innocent it was, adding that the concert was "much bigger than she had imagined. It is something else now."

=== Film ===
Wæver's first acting role was as Ellen in the 1969 film Midt i en jazztid, which represented Denmark at that year's Moscow International Film Festival.

She also contributed to the 1977 film Aftenlandet, which represented Denmark at that year's Moscow International Film Festival.

== Later life ==
Wæver left DR in 1971 to become a high school teacher.

== Filmography ==
=== Television ===
Year	Title	Role
1964	Eurovision Song Contest	Presenter

=== Film ===
Year	Title	Role
1969	Midt i en jazzvid	Ellen
1977	Aftenlandet	Contributor

== See also ==
- List of Eurovision Song Contest presenters

Preceded by (United Kingdom) Katie Boyle	Eurovision Song Contest presenter 1964	Succeeded by (Italy) Renata Mauro
