= Netherlands in the Eurovision Song Contest 1964 =

- Eurovision Song Contest 1964
- Participating broadcaster: Nederlandse Televisie Stichting (NTS)
- Country: Netherlands
- Selection process: Artist: Internal selection Song: Nationaal Songfestival 1964
- Selection date: 24 February 1964

Competing entry
- Song: "Jij bent mijn leven"
- Artist: Anneke Grönloh
- Songwriters: Ted Powder; René de Vos

Placement
- Final result: 10th, 2 points

Participation chronology

The Netherlands was represented at the Eurovision Song Contest 1964 with the song "Jij bent mijn leven", composed by Ted Powder, with lyrics by René de Vos, and performed by Anneke Grönloh. The Dutch participating Broadcaster, Nederlandse Televisie Stichting (NTS), selected its entry through a national final, after having previously selected the performer internally.

== Before Eurovision ==
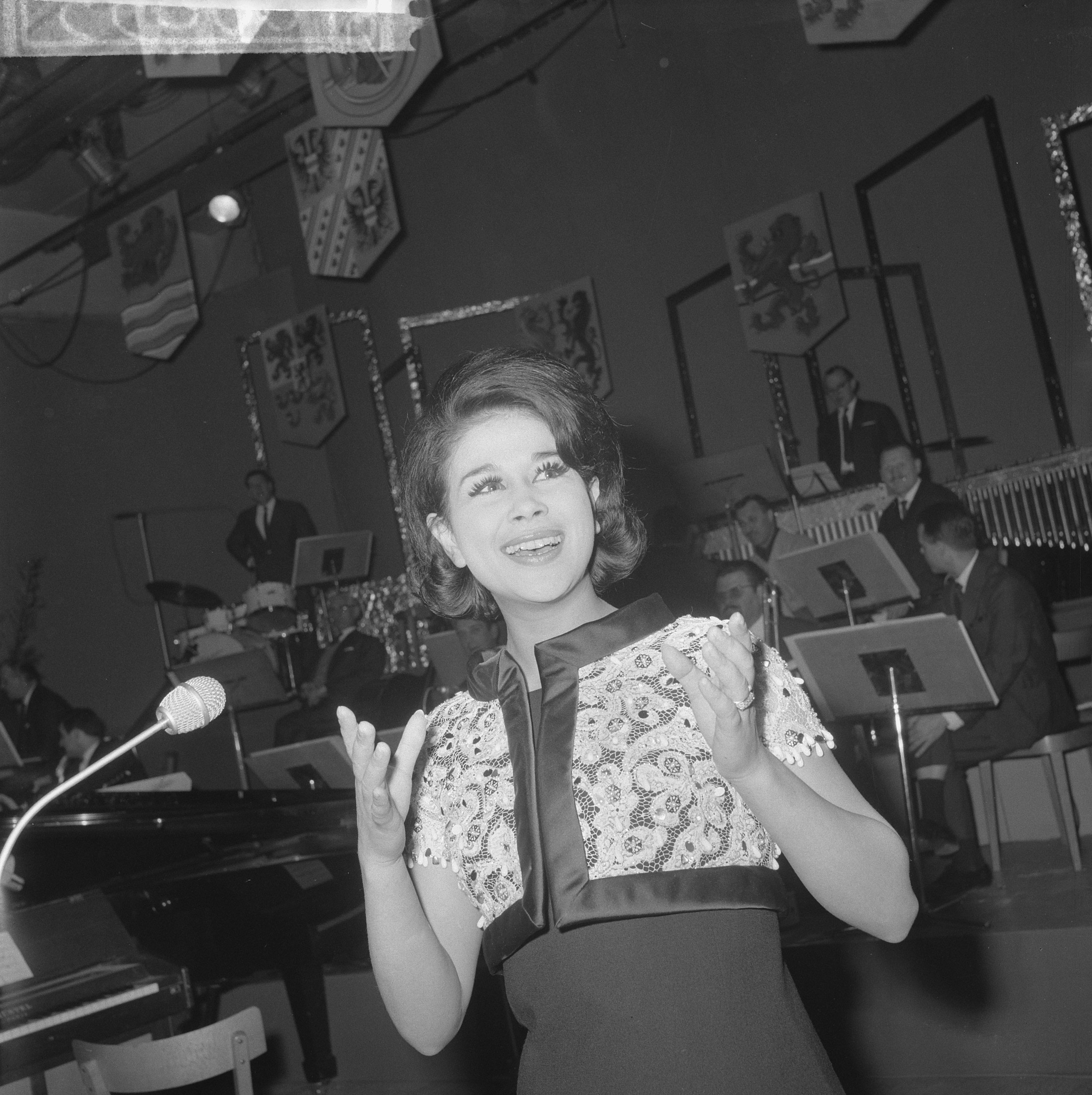
Anneke Gronloh was selected to represent Netherlands in 1964

=== Nationaal Songfestival 1964 ===
Nederlandse Televisie Stichting (NTS) held the national final the Tivoli in Utrecht, hosted by Elles Berger. 206 songs were submitted for the national final. The selection committee included Gijs Stappershoef, Melle Weersma, Ger van Leeuwen, Bert Paige, Co de Kloet, and Ton Kool.

Four of the songs that were not selected to the national final were recorded by Grönloh herself. These songs include:

Song	Songwriter(s)	
Song	Composer	Lyricist
"De laatste roos"	Ger van Leeuwen	Gerrit den Braber
"De zigeunerkoning"	Ger van Leeuwen	Gerrit den Braber
"In mijn hart schuilt een lied"	Arie Pronk	Han Loudon
"Ik zing van het wonder in 't leven"	Arie Pronk	Han Loudon

Three songs were performed and voted on by a professional jury and regional juries from all eleven Dutch provinces, with all of the juries splitting 30 total points to their desired songs. The winner was the song "Jij bent mijn leven", composed by Ted Powder and written by René de Vos.

Final – 24 February 1964
R/O	Song	Songwriter(s)		Total	Place
R/O	Song	Composer	Lyricist	Total	Place
1	"Jij bent mijn leven"	Ted Powder	René de Vos	159	1
2	"Weer zingt de wind"	Joop Portengen	Gerrit den Braber	141	2
3	"Vliegende Hollander"	Jan Mol		60	3

Final – Detailed jury voting results
R/O	Song	Groningen	Limburg	Friesland	Gelderland	North Holland	North Brabant	South Holland	Zeeland	Noordoostpolder	Professional jury	Drenthe	Utrecht	Total
1	"Jij bent mijn leven"	13	18	20	18	12	7	10	17	13	7	15	9	159
2	"Weer zingt de wind"	8	6	6	11	6	15	20	9	15	17	15	13	141
3	"Vliegende Hollander"	9	6	4	1	12	8	0	4	2	6	0	8	60

== At Eurovision ==
On the night of the final Grönloh performed second in the running order, following Luxembourg and preceding Norway. Only an audio recording of Grönloh's performance is known to exist. Voting was by each national jury awarding 5, 3 and 1 points to their top three songs, and at the close of voting "Jij bent mijn leven" had received 2 points (1 each from Denmark and the United Kingdom), placing the Netherlands joint 10th (with Belgium) of the 16 entries. The Dutch jury awarded its 5 points to runaway contest winners Italy.

The Dutch conductor at the contest was Dolf van der Linden.

=== Voting ===
Points awarded to the Netherlands
Score	Country
5 points	
3 points	
1 point	Denmark; United Kingdom

Points awarded by the Netherlands
Score	Country
5 points	Italy
3 points	Luxembourg
1 point	United Kingdom
