= Germany in the Eurovision Song Contest 1964 =

- Eurovision Song Contest 1964
- Participating broadcaster: ARD (Note: Arbeitsgemeinschaft der öffentlich-rechtlichen Rundfunkanstalten der Bundesrepublik Deutschland) – Hessischer Rundfunk (HR)
- Country: Germany
- Selection process: Ein Lied für Kopenhagen
- Selection date: 11 January 1964

Competing entry
- Song: "Man gewöhnt sich so schnell an das Schöne"
- Artist: Nora Nova
- Songwriters: Rudi von der Dovenmühle; Niels Nobach

Placement
- Final result: 13th, 0 points

Participation chronology

Germany was represented at the Eurovision Song Contest 1964 with the song "Man gewöhnt sich so schnell an das Schöne", composed by Rudi von der Dovenmühle, with lyrics by Niels Nobach, and performed by Nora Nova. The German participating broadcaster on behalf of ARD, Hessischer Rundfunk (HR), selected its entry through a national final.

"Man gewöhnt sich so schnell an das Schöne" held the joint record for the longest ever song title in a Eurovision final alongside "C'est le dernier qui a parlé qui a raison" which represented France at the 1991 contest until both were succeeded by "(nendest) narkootikumidest ei tea me (küll) midagi" which represented Estonia at the 2024 contest.

== Before Eurovision ==
=== Ein Lied für Kopenhagen ===
The final was held at the TV studios in Frankfurt, hosted by Hilde Nocker. Six songs took part, with the winner chosen by an "expert" jury and a public jury. Only the scores and placements of the top three songs are currently known.

Ein Lied für Kopenhagen – 11 January 1964
R/O	Artist	Song	Votes	Place
1	Fred Bertelmann	"Das macht dein Lächeln, Mona Lisa"	19	3
2	Peter Kirsten	"Regenbogen, Regenbogen"	18	4
3	René Kollo	"Wie vom Wind verweht"	0	6
4	Gitta Lind	"Ein Chanson in der Nacht"	27	2
5	Nora Nova	"Man gewöhnt sich so schnell an das Schöne"	38	1
6	Gerhard Wendland	"Wohin ist der Sommer?"	15	5

== At Eurovision ==
On the night of the final Nova performed 9th in the running order, following the United Kingdom and preceding Monaco. Only an audio recording of Nova's performance is known to exist. Voting was by each national jury awarding 5–3–1 to their top three songs, and at the close "Man gewöhnt sich so schnell an das Schöne" was one of four songs (along with the entries from Portugal, Switzerland, and Yugoslavia) which had failed to pick up a single point. This was the third consecutive contest in which four countries had failed to score, and the first nul points for Germany. The German jury awarded its 5 points to Luxembourg.

=== Voting ===
Germany did not receive any points at the 1964 Eurovision Song Contest.

Points awarded by Germany
Score	Country
5 points	Luxembourg
3 points	Italy
1 point	United Kingdom
