= Hans Hansen (architect) =

German architect

Hans Hansen (16 May 1889, Roetgen – 24 May 1966, Cologne) was a German architect and theorist and one of the correspondents of Bruno Taut's utopian expressionist chain letter, the Glass Chain. Hansen contributed under the pseudonym Antischmitz.

Hansen was born in Roetgen. In 1920 he attracted the attention and praise of Bruno Taut after the publication of his book "The Experience of Architecture" (Das Erlebnis der Architektur). Hansen later went on to become one of Germany's leading church architects. He died in Cologne.

== Published work ==
- "The Experience of Architecture" (Das Erlebnis der Architektur) 1920
- "The Building Yard" (Der Bauhof), essay published in "Call to Building", published as part of the "New Objectivity or New Building (lit.)" (Neues Bauen) exhibition in May 1920.
