= United Kingdom in the Eurovision Song Contest 1964 =

- Eurovision Song Contest 1964
- Participating broadcaster: British Broadcasting Corporation (BBC)
- Country: United Kingdom
- Selection process: Artist: Internal selection Song: A Song for Europe 1964
- Selection date: 7 February 1964

Competing entry
- Song: "I Love the Little Things"
- Artist: Matt Monro
- Songwriter: Tony Hatch

Placement
- Final result: 2nd, 17 points

Participation chronology

The United Kingdom was represented at the Eurovision Song Contest 1964 with the song "I Love the Little Things", written by Tony Hatch, and performed by Matt Monro. The British participating broadcaster, the British Broadcasting Corporation (BBC), selected its entry through a national final, after having previously selected the performer internally.

== Before Eurovision ==
=== A Song for Europe 1964 ===
The British Broadcasting Corporation (BBC) held a national selection to choose the song that would go to the Eurovision Song Contest 1964. It was held on 7 February 1964 and presented by David Jacobs.

BBC chose Matt Monro to sing the entries and juries made up of members of the public in sixteen British cities selected "I Love the Little Things" for him to sing at Eurovision.

R/O	Song	Songwriter(s)	Points	Place
1	"Choose"	Lionel Bart	16	4
2	"It's Funny How You Know"	Philip Green and Norman Newell	11	6
3	"I Love the Little Things"	Tony Hatch	87	1
4	"I've Got the Moon on My Side"	Mitch Murray	43	2
5	"Ten Out of Ten"	Leslie Bricusse	15	5
6	"Beautiful, Beautiful"	Hal Shaper	20	3

Monro released all six songs from the British final on an Extended Play maxi single A Song for Europe, which reached number 16 in the EP top 20 chart. He subsequently released the winning song on single, with the runner up on the B-Side, but this single failed to reach the official UK Singles Chart.

== At Eurovision ==
"I Love the Little Things" went on to come 2nd in Eurovision.

The contest was broadcast on BBC TV, with commentary provided by David Jacobs.

=== Voting ===
Points awarded to the United Kingdom
Score	Country
5 points	Norway; Switzerland
3 points	Finland
1 point	Austria; France; Germany; Netherlands

Points awarded by the United Kingdom
Score	Country
5 points	Italy
3 points	Finland
1 point	Netherlands
