= Tivoli Concert Hall =

Concert venue in Copenhagen, Denmark

- Tivolis Koncertsal
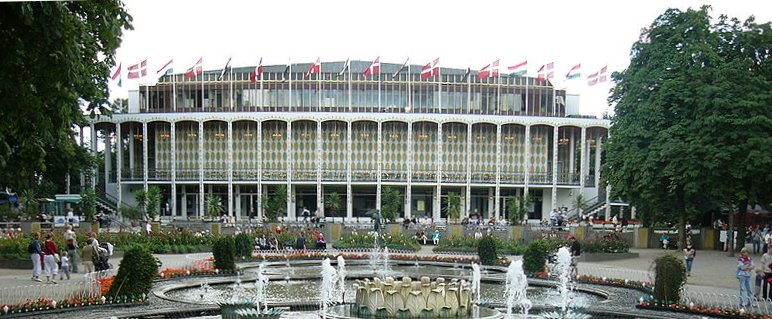
- Interactive map of Tivoli Concert Hall
- Location: Tivoli Gardens, Copenhagen, Denmark
- Coordinates: 55°40′22″N 12°34′06″E
- Capacity: 1,660
- Type: Concert hall

Construction
- Built: 1954–1956
- Opened: 1956
- Renovated: 2005
- Architects: Frits Schlegel; Hans Hansen

Tenant
- Eurovision Song Contest 1964

Tivoli Concert Hall (Danish: Tivolis Koncertsal) is a 1,660-capacity concert hall at Tivoli Gardens in Copenhagen, Denmark. The building, which was designed by Frits Schlegel and Hans Hansen, was built between 1954 and 1956. The concert hall is used for classical music (e.g. Tivoli Symphony Orchestra), Broadway musicals, and jazz musicians.

== History ==
The hall used to host pop and rock concerts. Notable artists that have performed at the venue include Mireille Mathieu, The Grateful Dead, Country Joe and the Fish, Ike & Tina Turner, Elton John, Procol Harum, Saga, Uriah Heep, Cream, Jerry Lee Lewis, Jethro Tull and Norah Jones. Today it is mostly used for classical, acoustic, and jazz music. The Eurovision Song Contest 1964 was broadcast from the auditorium.

=== The first concert hall ===
The first concert hall in Tivoli Gardens opened in 1843. It was expanded in 1873 and is the building now known as the Glass Hall. Hans Christian Lumbye was music director and chief conductor from 1843 until 1872. He wrote almost 700 compositions for the orchestra, especially polkas, valses and galops.

=== The 1902 concert hall ===
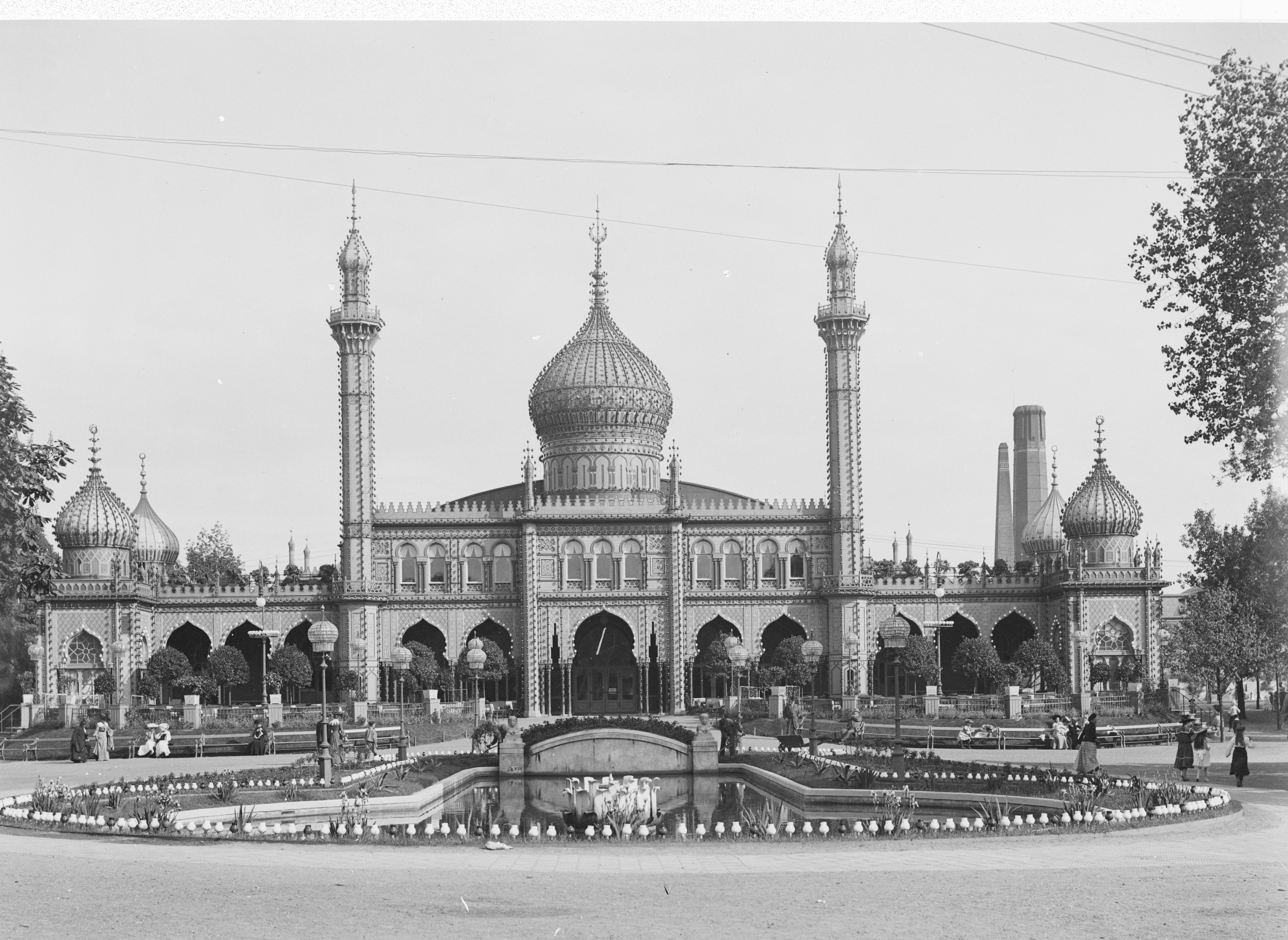
The concert hall from 1902

A new concert hall was built in "Moorish style" in 1902. The building was designed by Knud Arne Petersen and Richard Bergmann.

=== The current building ===
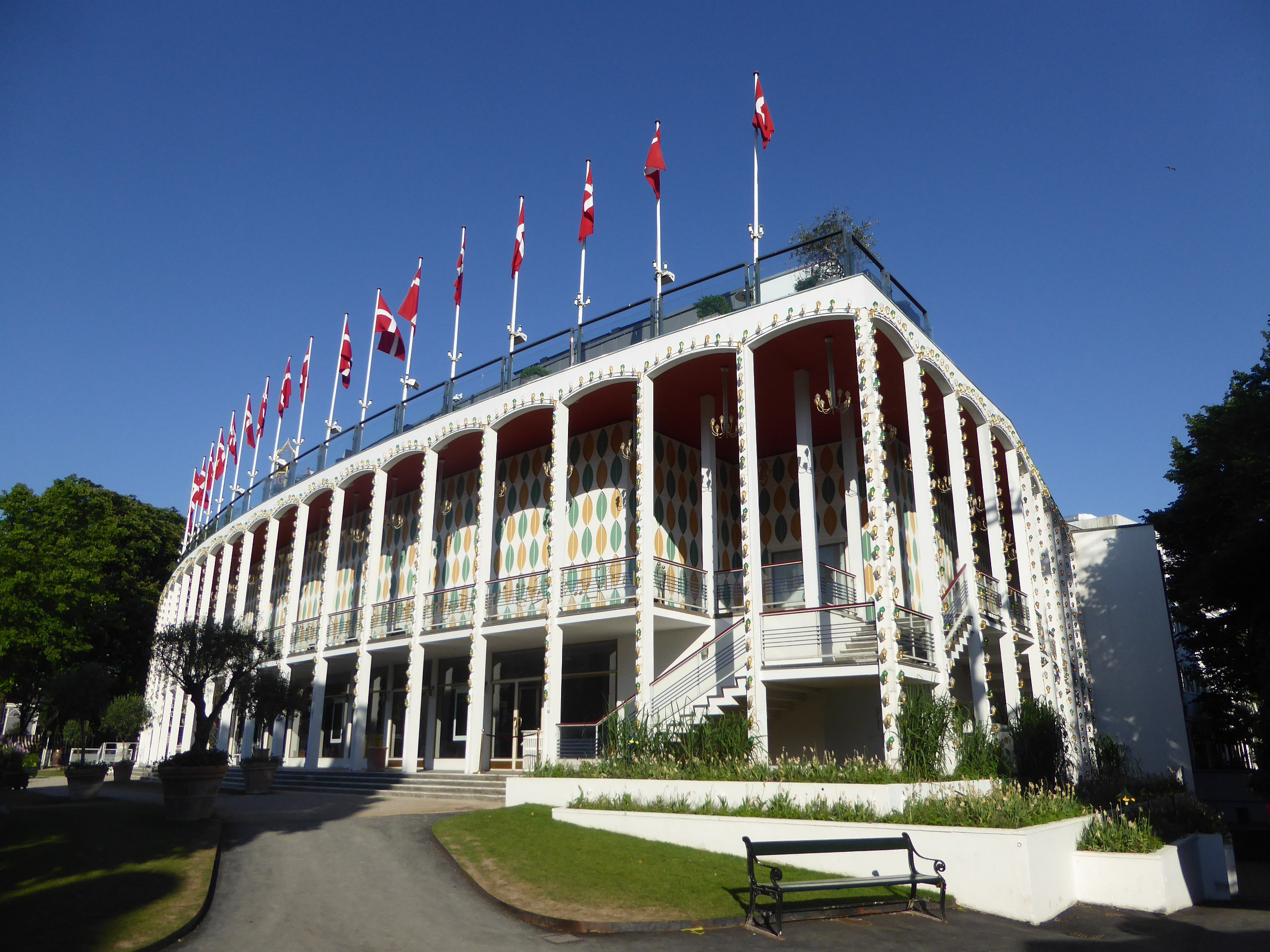
The concert hall in May 2018.

The concert hall was destroyed when Tivoli Gardens was hit during the schalburgtage on the night between 24 and 25 June 1944. The concert hall was rebuilt to a new, Modernist design by Frits Schlegel and Hans Hansen.

In 2005 the concert hall saw a major renovation and extension by 3XN where the classical 1950s style of the main auditorium—including a characteristic color scheme of red, blue, yellow and green—was restored, while visitor facilities were upgraded and expanded.

== Use ==
=== Classical music ===
Until 2009, the Orchestra was based in the Tivoli Concert Hall. Since then the Copenhagen Philharmonic has been based at the former Danmarks Radio concert hall, which is now the concert hall of the Royal Danish Academy of Music. During the summer season, while the Tivoli Gardens are open, the orchestra continues to perform in the Tivoli Concert Hall under the name Tivoli Symphony Orchestra.

=== Musicals ===
- 2010–11: Elsk mig i nat
- 2010–11: Mamma Mia!
- 2012: Grease
- 2014: Grease
- 2014: Hodja Fra Pjort
- 2015: Dirty Dancing
- 2016: Hairspray
- 2017. Spamalot
- 2017: Elf
- 2018: Kærlighed ved første hik - the musical

=== Jazz music ===
On several occasions, jazz recording artists performed at the venue.

=== Rock music ===
The Grateful Dead included the Concert Hall on its itinerary for their Europe '72 tour, and played two shows in the Hall on April 14 & 17, 1972, both of which were recorded and released as individual shows and as part of their Europe '72: The Complete Recordings box set. The majority of the April 17, 1972, show was also filmed by Danish TV and released in three episodes on April 17, 1972, August 12, 1972 and August 25, 1972.

== See also ==
- Tivoli Gardens
- List of concert halls in Denmark

Preceded by BBC Television Centre; London	Eurovision Song Contest; Venue; 1964	Succeeded by Sala di Concerto della RAI; Naples
