= Nora Nova =

Bulgarian-born singer (1928–2022)

- Born: Ahinora Kumanova; 8 May 1928; Sofia, Bulgaria
- Died: 9 February 2022 (aged 93)
- Occupation: Singer
- Years active: 1960-1965
- Labels: Ariola, Electrola

Ahinora Kumanova (Bulgarian: Ахинора Куманова; 8 May 1928 – 9 February 2022), better known by the stage name of Nora Nova, was a Bulgarian and German singer. She was the first Bulgarian to participate in the Eurovision Song Contest. She represented West Germany in 1964. Bulgaria itself first participated only in 2005.

Her father was an official of Tsar Boris III of Bulgaria and she reported that she was raised a monarchist. After the regime change in the end of World War II, some of her relatives were sent to the Belene concentration camp or sentenced to death by the People's Court.

In 1959, Ahinora left Communist Bulgaria by contracting a marriage in name only with a German national. After she came to West Germany in 1960, she won a singing contest called Die große Chance ("The Great Chance") organized by Electrola, a West German recording company. After scoring a number of hits in the West German and Swiss charts, in 1964, she was chosen to represent West Germany at the Copenhagen Eurovision Song Contest finals. Her song, "Man gewöhnt sich so schnell an das Schöne", had the longest name in Eurovision Song Contest history alongside C'est le dernier qui a parlé qui a raison which represented France in 1991, until both were succeeded by The Social Network Song (Oh Oh - Uh - Oh Oh) which represented San Marino in 2012. With it she had another record — nul points for West Germany, and hence 13th (last) place.

Kumanova returned to Bulgaria after the 1989 democratic changes. She opened a fashion boutique shop in Sofia. In 2001, she became one of the founders of the NDSV political party led by the former Bulgarian Tsar Simeon Sakskoburggotski. She had explained that action with her monarchist convictions (which she states were the reason for her to leave Bulgaria during Communist rule) and with her belief in the personal integrity of Tsar Simeon II, whom she referred to as "the tsar" and described as "pure" and an "icon" with a unique aura.

== Death ==
She died on 9 February 2022, at the age of 93.

Preceded by Heidi Brühl with Marcel	Germany in the Eurovision Song Contest; 1964	Succeeded by Ulla Wiesner with Paradies, wo bist du?
