= Anneke Grönloh =

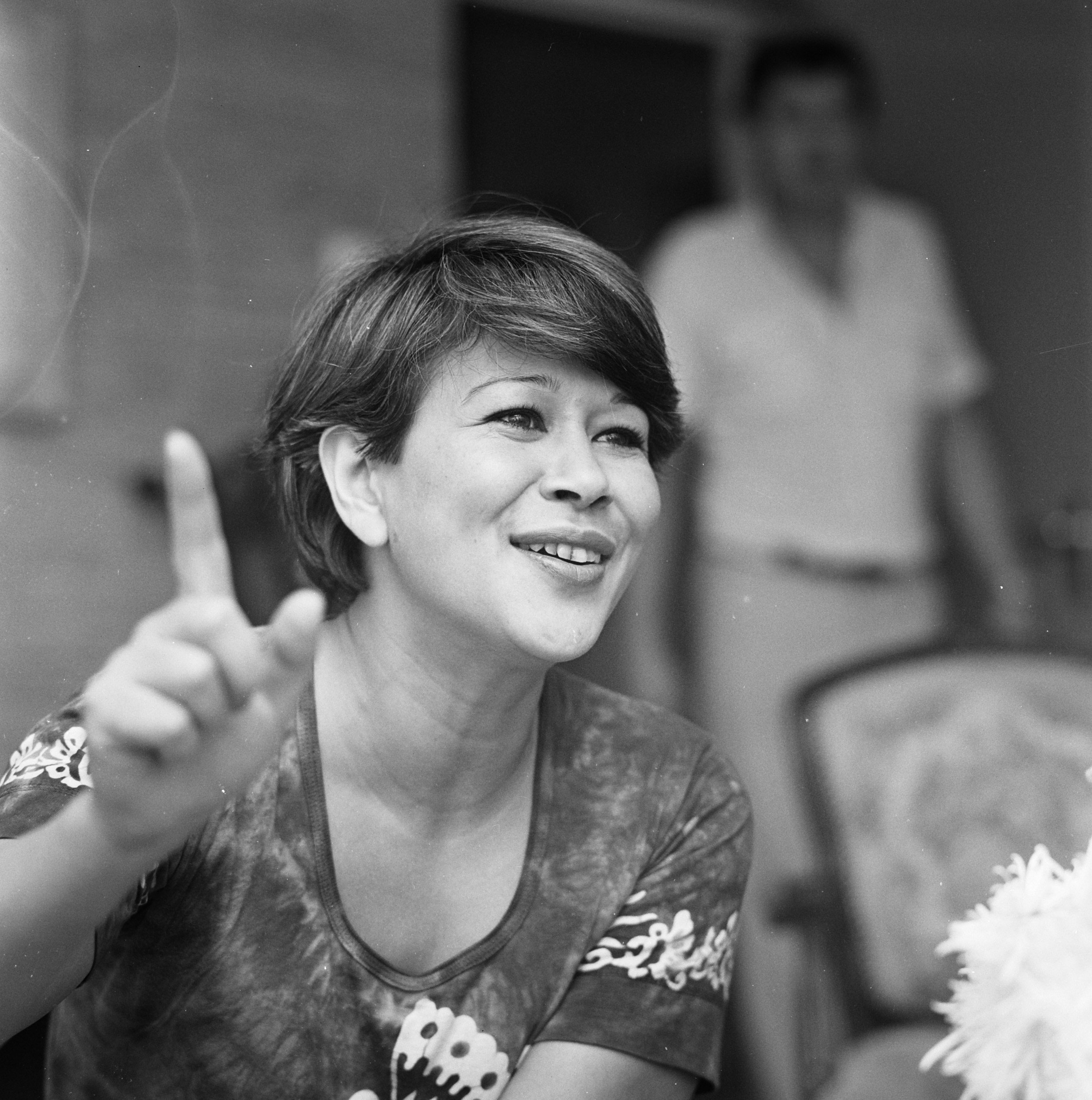
- Grönloh in 1979

Background information
- Born: Johanna Louise Grönloh; 7 June 1942; Tondano, Japanese East Indies
- Died: 14 September 2018 (aged 76) Arleuf, France
- Genres: Pop, jazz, kroncong
- Years active: 1959–2017

Johanna Louise "Anneke" Grönloh (Dutch pronunciation: [ˈɑnəkə ˈɡrʏnloː]; 7 June 1942 – 14 September 2018) was a Dutch singer. She had a successful career starting in 1959 that lasted throughout the 1960s, and scored a hit with "Brandend Zand", one of the best-selling Dutch songs of all time.

== Early life ==
Grönloh was born in Tondano, North Sulawesi, Dutch East Indies (present-day Indonesia), and spent her early years in the Japanese-occupied Dutch East Indies in a Japanese concentration camp in Fukuoka. Her father, an officer of the Royal Netherlands East Indies Army (KNIL), had been interned before her birth. She was a third cousin once removed of Dutch writer Nescio. After the war, the family moved to the Netherlands, and Grönloh grew up in Eindhoven.

== Career ==
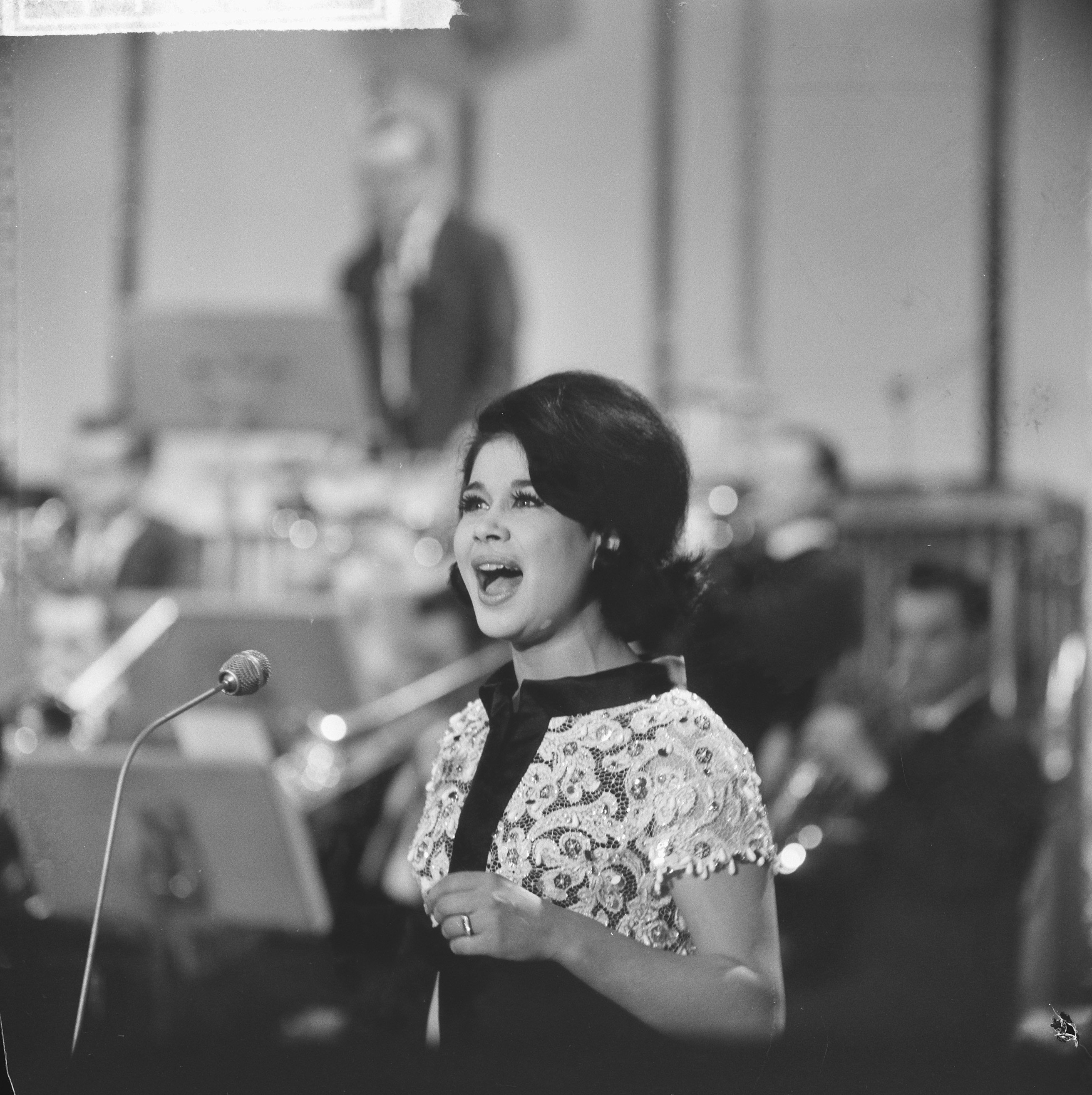
Grönloh at the Nationaal Songfestival in 1964

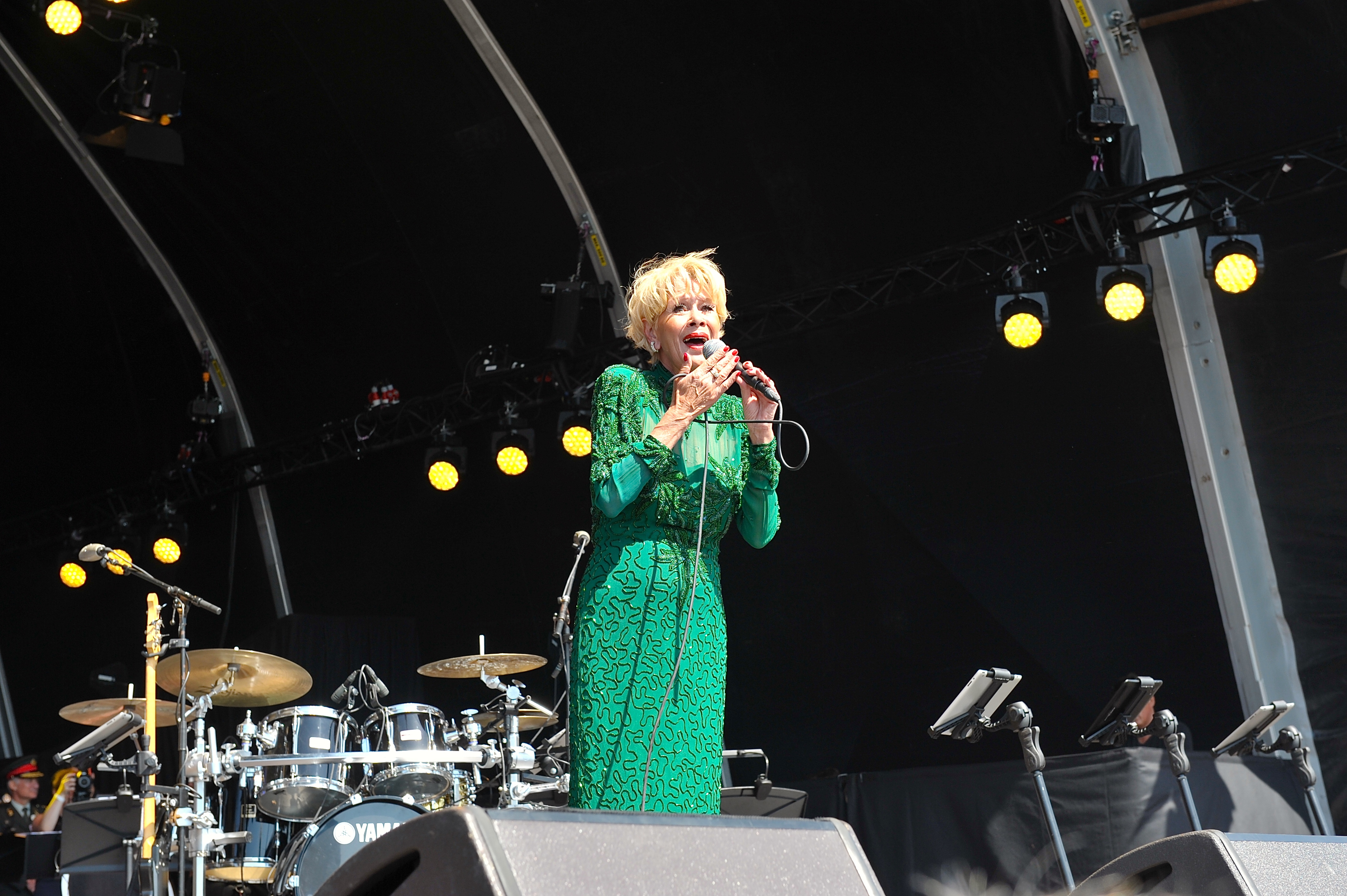
Grönloh in 2015

During her time in secondary school, she met Peter Koelewijn, with whom she began performing at parties. In 1959, her career took off after she won a talent show. On 31 August 1964 she married Wim-Jaap van der Laan, a DJ at the Dutch radio station Radio Veronica, and in 1965 began singing in the Sleeswijk Revue.

Throughout the 1960s she scored hits, especially with "Brandend zand" (Burning sand). At the height of her fame, Grönloh represented the Netherlands in the Eurovision Song Contest 1964 with the song "Jij bent mijn leven" (You are my life), finishing in tenth place, and by the end of the 1960s she had begun an international singing career.

Besides popular music, Grönloh performed songs in the kroncong genre, such as "Bengawan Solo", "Boeroeng Kakatua", and "Nina Bobo", as well as jazz songs, which according to her was her favourite musical genre.

In 2000, Grönloh was named "Singer of the Century" in the Netherlands because of the record-breaking sales of "Brandend zand". In the same year, she was also a participant on the television program Big Brother VIPS. In 2006 she released Anneke and Friends, a DVD of her theater tours. Later that year she was part of the theater tour "Purple 100", replacing Corry Brokken who could not perform due to illness.

Grönloh had retired due to health problems, having played her last show on 26 August 2017. She died on 14 September 2018 in Arleuf, France, aged 76.

== Posthumous releases ==
Samen willen bouwen (Want to Build Together), a fourth duet with Ronnie Tober and producer Patrick van Bree, was released posthumously in 2021 on Spotify and Youtube.

Two new songs, written by André Hazes and sung by Anneke as a demo in 1983 were also released posthumously in 2025 at an album launch in Oranjerie Hydepark, Doorn. Anneke's former manager and close friend Bart Peeters said, “Of course it's wonderful that there's new music. That's important for the audience and for the cultural legacy."

== Discography ==
- "Asmara" (1960, in Indonesian)
- "Flamenco Rock"
- "Brandend zand" (1961) – gold
- "Paradiso" (1962) – platinum
- "Soerabaja" (1963)
- "Cimeroni" (1963)
- "Oh Malaysia" (1963)

Awards and achievements
Preceded by Annie Palmen with "Een speeldoos"	Netherlands in the Eurovision Song Contest; 1964	Succeeded by Conny Vandenbos with "'t Is genoeg"
