= Switzerland in the Eurovision Song Contest 1964 =

- Eurovision Song Contest 1964
- Participating broadcaster: Swiss Broadcasting Corporation (SRG SSR)
- Country: Switzerland
- Selection process: Grosser Preis der Eurovision 1964
- Selection date: 8 February 1964

Competing entry
- Song: "I miei pensieri"
- Artist: Anita Traversi
- Songwriters: Giovanni Pelli; Sanzio Chiesa

Placement
- Final result: 13th, 0 points

Participation chronology

Switzerland was represented at the Eurovision Song Contest 1964 with the song "I miei pensieri", composed by Giovanni Pelli, with lyrics by Sanzio Chiesa, and performed by Anita Traversi. The Swiss participating broadcaster, the Swiss Broadcasting Corporation (SRG SSR), selected its entry through a national final.

== Before Eurovision ==
=== Regional selections ===
The Swiss Broadcasting Corporation (SRG SSR) held a national final to select its entry for the Eurovision Song Contest 1964. The national final was a collaboration between three broadcasters that comprised SRG SSR: the Swiss-German and Romansh broadcaster Schweizer Fernsehen der deutschen und rätoromanischen Schweiz (SF DRS), the Swiss-French broadcaster Télévision suisse romande (TSR), and the Swiss-Italian broadcaster Televisione svizzera di lingua italiana (TSI). Since 1963, unlike previous Swiss national finals, where all composite broadcasters internally selected their entries, said broadcasters could hold their own regional selection methods. Schweizer Fernsehen der deutschen und rätoromanischen Schweiz (SF DRS) held a public preselection, while the remaining regional broadcasters internally selected their entries.

==== Swiss-German selection ====
Between late December and early January, listeners of Radio Beromünster were invited to act as a jury and would register to vote by sending postcards to Radio Studio Basel in Novastrasse marked "Schlagerwettbewerb" with their favorite song written down. The event was broadcast on radio on 6 January at 20:00 CET (19:00 UTC) and was hosted by A. Werner. The nine candidate songs were sung by Georges Pilloud, Hugo Richard, and Ulla Rafaël with Cédric Dumont and Hans Moeckel accompanying the orchestra. Two songs would be chosen to advance in the nationwide final; the song with the most postcard votes and the song chosen by an "expert" jury.

On 13 January, it was revealed that the winning songs were "Amore in Ticino" by Georges Pilloud and "Allround cha-cha-cha" by Ulla Rafaël. Further details of the event, including the full results and remaining song titles remain unknown.

=== Grosser Preis der Eurovision 1964 ===
Six songs took part in the selection, with two songs being performed each in French, German, and Italian. Six artists took part to represent Switzerland, among whom was Anita Traversi; who previously represented Switzerland in 1960.

Competing entries
Broadcaster	Artist	Song	Songwriter(s)		Language
Broadcaster	Artist	Song	Composer(s)	Lyricist	Language
TSI	Anita Traversi	"Mandolino"	Bruno Caroli; Mario Robbiani	Sanzio Chiesa	Italian
TSI	Anita Traversi	"I miei pensieri"	Giovanni Pelli	Sanzio Chiesa	Italian
DRS	Georges Pilloud	"Amore in Ticino"	Unknown		German
DRS	Ulla Rafaël	"Allround cha-cha-cha"	Renato Bui	Kai Schwindt	German
TSR	Jean-Pierre & Nathalie	"Le temps d'aimer"	Unknown		French
TSR	Jo Roland	"Rêverie"	Unknown		French

Swiss German and Romansh broadcaster Schweizer Fernsehen der deutschen und rätoromanischen Schweiz (SF DRS) staged the national final on 8 February 1964 at 20:20 CET (19:20 UTC) in Zürich. It was presented by Heidi Abel, Francis Bernier, and Mascia Cantoni.

The voting consisted of three regional juries from Bern, Lausanne, and Lugano, with nine members each. Each juror would give 3 points to their favorite song, 2 to their second favorite, and 1 to their third favorite. The jurors disregarded the songwriters in favor of the quality of the songs and the validity of the lyrics.

The winner was the song "I miei pensieri" composed by Giovanni Pelli, written by Sanzio Chiesa, and performed by Anita Traversi, which was favored by the Bernese jury. It is reported that the song "Le temps d'aimer" by Jean-Pierre & Nathalie received at least 31 points— 19 from the Lausanne jury and 12 from Lugano.

Final – 8 February 1964
R/O	Artist(s)	Song	Place
1	Anita Traversi	"Mandolino"	3
2	Georges Pilloud	"Amore in Ticino"	Unknown
3	Jean-Pierre & Nathalie	"Le temps d'aimer"	Unknown
4	Ulla Rafaël	"Allround cha-cha-cha"	Unknown
5	Jo Roland	"Rêverie"	Unknown
6	Anita Traversi	"I miei pensieri"	1

=== Releases ===
Anita Traversi recorded and released "I miei pensieri" in the B-side of a single titled "Solo Di Notte / I Miei Pensieri" in 1964. A multilingual version in German, Spanish, French, and English titled "Ti Amo - Je T'aime - I Love You" was also released that same year. In 1998, the song was featured in a CD compilation titled "Concours Eurovision De La Chanson 1956-1998: Schweizer Beiträge", which compiled every Swiss Eurovision entry at the time.

Out of the other songs in the selection, a recording of "Mandolino", sung by Anita Traversi has been preserved in the Swiss National Sound Archives. A cover version of "Allround cha-cha-cha" was released by Liane Covi and the Renato Bui Orchestra in 1964.

== At Eurovision ==
Many of the participants pictured at the aftershow party following Eurovision 1964. Anita Traversi is the second person to the left at the back row.

At the Eurovision Song Contest 1964 in Copenhagen, the Swiss entry was the fourteenth song of the night following Yugoslavia and preceding Belgium. The Swiss entry was conducted by Fernando Paggi, who previously conducted the 1961 Swiss entry and was the musical director for the 1956 contest and conducted several songs. At the close of voting, Switzerland had received nul points along with Germany, Portugal, and Yugoslavia.

The contest was broadcast on SRG SSR via TV DRS and Radio Beromünster (Note: Delayed broadcast on 23 March at 20:00 (CET)) in German-speaking Switzerland, TSR (with commentary from Robert Burnier) and Radio Sottens in Romandy, and TSI in Ticino.

=== Voting ===
Each participating broadcaster assembled a ten-member jury panel. Every jury member could distribute 9 points in 3 different ways depending on how the jurors voted; 5, 3, and 1 points to their 3 favorite songs, 6 and 3 points to their 2 favorite songs, or 9 points to a single song.

==== Points awarded to Switzerland ====
Switzerland did not receive any points in the contest.

Points awarded by Switzerland
Score	Country
5 points	United Kingdom
3 points	Italy
1 point	Monaco
