= Rachel (singer) =

French singer

Rachel Ros (born 11 August 1942 in Cavaillon, Vaucluse) is a French singer best known in Europe for representing France in the Eurovision Song Contest 1964.

== Biography ==
Before starting her musical career, she worked as a lift girl in Paris and in the mail administration of a record label.

She entered a singing competition organised by Mireille Hartuch who had invited Rachel to her televised show Le Petit Conservatoire de la chanson.

She went on to sign a contract with the Barclay Records label, and released her first (45 rpm) recording entitled "Les Amants Blessés" in 1963.

In 1964, she represented France in the Eurovision Song Contest in Copenhagen with her entry called "Le Chant de Mallory", written by Pierre Cour and André Popp, which was her greatest hit. She did not win, but scored 14 points and finished in fourth place.

== Discography ==
=== 45 rpm ===
- "Les Amants Blessés" (1963)
- "Le Chant de Mallory"
- "Le Doux Paysage" (1964)
- "Un Pays" (1965)
- "L'oiseau d'Italie" (1966)
- "La Fiesta" (1967)
- "Qu'ils sont heureux" (1967)
- her version of "L'Amour est bleu" (1968) song performed in Eurovision Song Contest 1967 by Vicky Leandros

Preceded by Alain Barrière with Elle était si jolie	France in the Eurovision Song Contest; 1964	Succeeded by Guy Mardel with N'avoue jamais
