= Jacques Denjean =

French composer and arranger

Jacques Denjean (25 May 1929 – 21 December 1995) was a French composer and arranger, active in the 1960s and 1970s.

He worked with artists such as Dionne Warwick, Françoise Hardy, Nana Mouskouri, Johnny Hallyday, Barış Manço, Maria del Mar Bonet and Guy Béart, chiefly as an arranger.

Denjean was also a member of the French vocal group, Les Double Six.

He is also known for his film scores, including:

- Morbo (1972)
- Vive la vie (TV) (1966)
- Adieu Philippine (1962)

== Discography ==
LPs

- Jazz (1962)
- Un disque à tout casser (1963)
- The Tough Touch (1964)

EPs

- La route (1963)
- Écoutez-moi (1965)

Singles

- "Névrose / Psychomaniac"
