= Yugoslavia in the Eurovision Song Contest 1964 =

- Eurovision Song Contest 1964
- Participating broadcaster: Yugoslav Radio Television (JRT)
- Country: Yugoslavia
- Selection process: Jugovizija 1964
- Selection date: 5 February 1964

Competing entry
- Song: "Život je sklopio krug"
- Artist: Sabahudin Kurt
- Songwriters: Srđan Matijević; Stevan Raičković

Placement
- Final result: 13th, 0 points

Participation chronology

Yugoslavia was represented at the Eurovision Song Contest 1964 with the song "Život je sklopio krug", composed by Srđan Matijević, with lyrics by Stevan Raičković, and performed by Sabahudin Kurt. The Yugoslav participating broadcaster, Yugoslav Radio Television (JRT), selected its entry through Jugovizija 1964.

== Before Eurovision ==
=== Jugovizija 1964 ===
The Yugoslav national final to select their entry, was held on 5 February at the Delavski Dom in Trbovlje, SR Slovenia, hosted by Helena Koder. There were 8 songs in the final, each from the four subnational public broadcasters: RTV Ljubljana, RTV Zagreb, RTV Belgrade, and RTV Sarajevo. The winner was chosen by the votes of an eight-member jury of experts, one juror for each of the six republics and the two autonomous provinces. At the end of the contest, there was a tie between Sabahudin Kurt's song "Život je sklopio krug" and Marjana Deržaj's "Zlati April". Since the Bosnian singer Sabahudin Kurt and his song received more top marks than Marjana Deržaj's, it was chosen as the winner. "Život je sklopio krug" was written by Srđan Matijević and Stevan Raičković.

Final – 6 February 1964
R/O	Broadcaster	Artist	Song	Points	Place
1	(Socialist Republic of Bosnia and Herzegovina) RTV Sarajevo	Boško Orobović	"Veče"	5	5
2	(Socialist Republic of Serbia) RTV Belgrade	Krsta Petrović	"Oka tvog da nema"	1	7
3	(Socialist Republic of Slovenia) RTV Ljubljana	Stane Mancini	"Kakor bela snežinka"	3	6
4	(Socialist Republic of Croatia) RTV Zagreb	Ivo Robić	"Njen prvi ples"	0	8
5	(Socialist Republic of Bosnia and Herzegovina) RTV Sarajevo	Sabahudin Kurt	"Život je sklopio krug"	21	1
6	(Socialist Republic of Serbia) RTV Belgrade	Lola Novaković	"Tragom zvezda"	8	4
7	(Socialist Republic of Slovenia) RTV Ljubljana	Marjana Deržaj	"Zlati April"	21	2
8	(Socialist Republic of Croatia) RTV Zagreb	Arsen Dedić	"Odluči se"	13	3

== At Eurovision ==
The contest was broadcast on Televizija Beograd, Televizija Zagreb, and Televizija Ljubljana.

Sabahudin Kurt performed 13th on the night of the Contest following Italy and preceding Switzerland. At the close of the voting the song had received 0 points (nul points), sharing 13th (last) place in the field of 16 competing countries.

=== Voting ===
Yugoslavia did not receive any points at the 1964 Eurovision Song Contest.

Points awarded by Yugoslavia
Score	Country
5 points	Italy
3 points	Monaco
1 point	France
