= 2 in 3 =

2 In 3

Studio album by Esther & Abi Ofarim
- Released: 1967
- Recorded: Trixi Tonstudios (Munich, Germany); Olympic Studios (London, UK); Studio Blanqui (Paris, France)
- Genre: Folk; pop; world
- Label: Philips
- Producer: Abi Ofarim, Ady Semel

Esther & Abi Ofarim chronology
Das Neue Esther & Abi Ofarim Album (1966)	2 In 3 (1967)	Up To Date (1968)

Singles from 2 In 3
- 1. "Morning of My Life" Released: 1967; 2. "Cinderella Rockefella" Released: 1968

2 In 3 is an album by Israeli folk duo Esther & Abi Ofarim. It was released on Philips Records in Europe in 1967. This is their most successful album, containing their hits "Cinderella Rockefella" and "Morning of My Life."

== Recording and release ==
After signing with Phillips Records in West Germany in 1963, Esther Ofarim and her husband Abi Ofarim became the country's top-selling pop recording artists. Following the success of Das Neue Esther & Abi Ofarim Album, the duo sings in eight different languages on the album 2 In 3, which was recorded in various European cities. Philips started off the album with initial pressings of 100,000 copies, a record for Germany at the time. 2 In 3 became Esther & Abi Ofarim's third No.1 album in Germany and it reached No. 6 on the UK Albums chart.

The album contains the Barry Gibb penned song "Morning of My Life." Esther & Abi Ofarim released the first version of this song in 1967. The Bee Gees later released other renditions. Esther & Abi Ofarim performed the song on the television special Gala-Abend der Schallplatte 1967 (Gala Disk Evenings 1967), the first color telecast in Europe. The single peaked at No. 2 in Germany and No. 9 in Austria.

The second single, "Cinderella Rockefella," became their biggest hit. The song was written by Mason Williams, a writer for the American TV series The Smothers Brothers Comedy Hour. Esther & Abi Ofarim first performed the song on the show in April 1967. The single was released in February 1968 and soon reached the top 10 in numerous countries, including No. 1 in the UK.

== Track listing ==
Side A
No.	Title	Writer(s)	Length
1.	"Hora"	Mordechai Zeira, Yakov Orland
2.	"Morning of My Life"	Barry Gibb
3.	"Le Déserteur"	Boris Vian, Harold C. Berg
4.	"Te Ador"	Ady Semel, Pan Peters
5.	"Jovanke"	Alexandra White, Pan Peters
6.	"Raziella"	Alexandra White, Pan Peters
7.	"Lonesome Road"	Gene Austin, Nathaniel Shilkret

Side B
No.	Title	Writer(s)	Length
1.	"El Vito"	Alexandra White, Pan Peters
2.	"Seeräuber-Jenny"	Bertolt Brecht, Kurt Weill
3.	"Wanderlove"	Mason Williams
4.	"Le Vent Et La Jeunesse"	Christian Chevallier, Frank Thomas, Jean-Michel Rivat
5.	"Shir Hanoded"	David Shimoni, Nahum Nardi
6.	"Cinderella Rockefella"	Mason Williams

== Chart performance ==
Chart (1968)	Peak position
Germany (GfK Entertainment)	1
UK (Official Charts Company)	6
