= Ofarim Concert – Live 1969 =

Studio album by Esther & Abi Ofarim
- Released: 1969
- Genre: Pop
- Label: Philips
- Producer: Abi Ofarim, Ady Semel

Esther & Abi Ofarim chronology
Up to Date (1968)	Ofarim Concert – Live 1969 (1969)

Ofarim Concert – Live 1969 is a live album by Esther & Abi Ofarim, recorded during the duo's 1969 European tour and released in the same year by Philips Records.

== Track listing ==
=== 1LP version ===
Side one
No.	Title	Writer(s)	Length
1.	"Morning of My Life"	Barry Gibb; Robin Gibb
2.	"Oh Waly Waly"
3.	"Adama Adamati"
4.	"Another Man"
5.	"Go Tell It on the Mountain"
6.	"Ein kleiner Tambour"

Side two
No.	Title	Writer(s)	Length
1.	"Frank Mills" (from 'Hair')
2.	"Garden of My Home"
3.	"She's Leaving Home"
4.	"Never Grow Old"	M. Franko; A. Semel
5.	"Down by the River"	Trad.; P. Peters; A. White
6.	"Cinderella-Rockefella"

=== 2LP version ===
Side one
No.	Title	Writer(s)	Length
1.	"Morning of My Life"	B. Gibb; R. Gibb
2.	"Yo ménamori de un eiri"
3.	"Oh Waly Waly"
4.	"Hachamor"	E. Zamir
5.	"Lord of the Reedy River"	Donovan
6.	"Canario"
7.	"Aba Heidschi bum-beidschi"

Side two
No.	Title	Writer(s)	Length
1.	"900 Miles from Home"
2.	"Un prince en Avignon"
3.	"Never Grow Old"	M. Franko; A. Semel
4.	"Adama Adamati"
5.	"She's Leaving Home"	Lennon; McCartney
6.	"Garden of My Home"	Barry Gibb; Robin Gibb
7.	"Ein kleiner Tambour"

Side three
No.	Title	Writer(s)	Length
1.	"Sanie cu zurgálái"
2.	"My Lagan Love"
3.	"Me Emek VeGive'a"
4.	"Ya viene marzo con flores"	Milton Okun
5.	"Go Tell It on the Mountain"
6.	"Another Man"
7.	"El vito"

Side four
No.	Title	Writer(s)	Length
1.	"Frank Mills" (from 'Hair')
2.	"Ma omrot einayich"
3.	"Down by the River"	Trad.; P. Peters; A. White
4.	"Guten Abend, gut' Nacht"
5.	"Cinderella-Rockefella"
6.	"Ty pasztoj"
7.	"Noch einen Tanz (One More Dance)"

== Charts ==
Chart (1969)	Peak position
German Albums (Offizielle Top 100)	14
UK Albums (OCC)	29
