= Ofarim =

Ofarim may refer to:

- Beit Aryeh-Ofarim, an Israeli settlement and local council in the northern West Bank

== People with the surname ==
- Abi Ofarim, born Avraham Reichstadt (1937–2018), Israeli musician and dancer
- Esther Ofarim (born 1941), Israeli singer
  - Esther & Abi Ofarim, musical duo
- Gil Ofarim (born 1982), German singer, songwriter and occasional actor, son of Abi Ofarim
