= Esther Ofarim and Abraham =

Studio album by Esther & Abi Ofarim
- Released: September 1963
- Recorded: 1963
- Genre: Folk; pop; latin; world
- Label: Philips
- Producer: Milton Okun

Esther & Abi Ofarim chronology
Foibles and Fables (1962)	Esther Ofarim and Abraham (1963)	Melodie Einer Nacht (1965)

Singles from Esther Ofarim and Abraham
- 1. "Lay-La" Released: 1963; 2. "Viva la feria" Released: 1963; 3. "Cha Cha Ballahoo" Released: 1965

Esther Ofarim and Abraham is the American debut album by Israeli folk duo Esther & Abi Ofarim. It was released on Philips Records in 1963. The album was titled Songs Der Welt in Germany.

== Recording and release ==
Singer Esther Ofarim and her husband Abi Ofarim relocated from Israel to Switzerland in 1963. Esther represented Switzerland in the 1963 Eurovision Song Contest, where she came in second place with the song "T'en va pas." The competition gave her considerable exposure and she signed to Philips Records. Prior to Eurovision, Esther had won first place in the Kol Israel song contest and the Sopot International Song Festival.

The duo recorded the album during their personal appearances in the United States in 1963. The musical direction, arrangement and production was done by Milton Okun. The Ofarims recorded songs in French, Hebrew, Spanish, and English with Abi accompanying on guitar.

The album opens with "Dirty Old Town" by British folk singer Ewan MacColl. "Viva la feria" is a traditional Spanish folk song. "Adama Adamati" and "Lay-La" are songs from the Ofarims' native Israel. "Cha Cha Ballahoo" is a calypso influenced song. "Every Night," a song originally from Scotland, was revived by folklorist Cecil Sharp. There are more traditional folk songs on Side B with "Freight Train" and "Oh Waly Waly," the latter is a rendition of "The Water Is Wide." Esther sings in French on "Entends-tu le vent?" and Spanish on "Ya viene marzo con flores."

Esther Ofarim and Abraham was released in the United States in September 1963. In Germany, the album was released as Songs Der Welt (Songs of the World), and reached No. 2 on the Albums chart in 1966.

== Critical reception ==
The album was chosen as Billboard's Folk Special Merit pick.

Billboard (September 14, 1963):

Miss Ofarim has achieved considerable distinction in her native Israel as a folk stylist and actress. Here she makes her American disc debut, with a collection of folk material with French, Spanish and American roots. Particularly impressive is her apparent complete mastery of English which she sings without a trace of accent. Her voice is pure and sincere, and her support from brother Abraham on guitar is superior. The traditional "Freight Train" with wonderful guitar licks is especially rewarding.

== Track listing ==
Side A
No.	Title	Writer(s)	Length
1.	"Dirty Old Town"	Ewan MacColl	2:30
2.	"Viva la feria"	Traditional	1:45
3.	"My Fisherman, My Lady-O"	Waldo Salt & Earl Robinson	3:10
4.	"Lay-La"	Nathan Alterman & Mordechai Zeira	2:35
5.	"Cha Cha Ballahoo"	Fran Minkoff & Fred Hellerman	2:27
6.	"Every Night"	Milton Okun	2:46

Side B
No.	Title	Writer(s)	Length
1.	"Adama Adamati"	Alexander Penn, Mordechai Zeira	1:54
2.	"Entends-tu le vent?"	Henry Lemarchand, Louis Rey	2:10
3.	"Freight Train"	Traditional	2:29
4.	"Oh Waly Waly"	Milton Okun	3:01
5.	"Oh Babe You're Gonna Wonder"	Tom Paxton	2:25
6.	"Ya viene marzo con flores"	Milton Okun	2:25

== Chart performance ==
Songs Der Welt
Chart (1966)	Peak position
Germany	2
