= Sing Hallelujah =

Sing Hallelujah may refer to:

- Sing Hallelujah!, production at The Village Gate
- Sing Hallelujah, album by Lonnie Donegan, 1962
- Sing Hallelujah, album by Esther Ofarim, 1966

== Songs ==
- "Sing Hallelujah", by The First Edition
- "Sing Hallelujah" (Mike Settle song), 1964
- "Sing Hallelujah!" (Dr. Alban song), 1993
- "Sing Hallelujah", by Steve McPherson from sung by Hillsong
- "Sing Hallelujah", by Steven Curtis Chapman from Re:creation
- "Sing Hallelujah", by German Bonds, 1966
- "Sing Noel, Sing Hallelujah", by Michael W. Smith from It's a Wonderful Christmas
- "Sing Hallelujah", by Chris and Conrad from Chris and Conrad (album)
- "Sing Hallelujah", by Mark Stoke from Sea to Sea: Filled with Your Glory
- "Sing Hallelujah to the Lord", by Linda Stassen, 1974
