= Sing! (album) =

Studio album by Esther & Abi Ofarim
- Released: October 1966
- Genre: Folk; pop; world
- Label: Philips
- Producer: Abi Ofarim

Esther & Abi Ofarim chronology
| Noch Einen Tanz (1966) | Sing! (1966) | 2 In 3 (1967) |

Singles from Das Neue Esther & Abi Ofarim Album
- 1. "Die Wahrheit (Die Fahrt Ins Heu)" Released: 1966; 2. "Sing Hallelujah" Released: 1966

Sing! is an album by Israeli folk duo Esther & Abi Ofarim. It was released on Philips Records in 1966. The album was released as The New Esther & Abi Ofarim Album in the UK, Sing Hallelujah! in the Netherlands, and Das Neue Esther & Abi Ofarim Album in Germany.

== Recording and release ==
The album was produced by Abi Ofarim and musical direction by Hans Hammerschmid.

Esther & Abi Ofarim's cover of "Sing Hallelujah" by Mike Settle was released as a single in 1966, reaching No. 30 on the German singles chart. They also cover songs by Bob Dylan, Ian Tyson, and the traditional negro spiritual "Sometimes I Feel Like a Motherless Child." The single "Die Wahrheit (Die Fahrt ins Heu)" was included on the German version of the album.

Following the release of the album in October 1966, Esther & Abi Ofarim toured West Germany in November to support the album. Das Neue Esther & Abi Ofarim Album was the second of three No. 1 albums for the duo in Germany. In response to the albums Neue Songs Der Welt and Das Neue Esther & Abi Ofarim Album from the German public, the duo made a donation to the Delphin Foundation for Crippled Children in December 1966.

Das Neue Esther & Abi Ofarim Album spent a total of 56 weeks on the chart (October 15, 1966 – November 15, 1967), and topped the charts for many weeks. By early 1967, their albums collectively had sold more than a million copies in Germany alone.

== Track listing ==
The German version contains four additional tracks: "Ma Omrot Einayich," "Ty Posztoj," "Die Wahrheit (Die Fahrt Ins Heu)," and "Yamin Usmol."

Side A
| No. | Title | Writer(s) | Length |
|---|---|---|---|
| 1. | "Sing Hallelujah" | Mike Settle | 2:42 |
| 2. | "Canario (Song of the Canary Islands)" | Daniel Martina, Pan Peters | 1:54 |
| 3. | "Sometimes I Feel Like a Motherless Child" | | 4:20 |
| 4. | "Empty Pocket Blues" | Pete Seeger | 3:36 |
| 5. | "Tomorrow Is a Long Time" | Bob Dylan | 3:30 |

Side B
| No. | Title | Writer(s) | Length |
|---|---|---|---|
| 1. | "I'm Going Home" | | 3:18 |
| 2. | "Mi Caballo (My Horse)" | | 2:45 |
| 3. | "Some Day Soon" | Ian Tyson | 2:19 |
| 4. | "Bonnie Boat" | | 3:28 |
| 5. | "Lonesome Traveller" | Lee Hays | 2:19 |

== Chart performance ==
Das Neue Esther & Abi Ofarim Album
| Chart | Peak position |
|---|---|
| Germany (GfK Entertainment) | 1 |
