= What Have They Done to the Rain =

"What Have They Done To The Rain"

Single by The Searchers
- B-side: "This Feeling Inside"
- Released: November 1964 (UK); January 1965 (US)
- Genre: Pop
- Length: 2:33
- Label: Pye 7N15739 (UK); Kapp 644 (USA)
- Songwriter: Malvina Reynolds

The Searchers singles chronology
"When You Walk in the Room" (1964)	"What Have They Done To The Rain" (1964)	"Goodbye My Love" (1965)

"What Have They Done to the Rain" is a protest song against above-ground nuclear testing written by Malvina Reynolds. The song has been sung by many singers such as Joan Baez, and a version by the English band The Searchers was released as a single, which charted in the US and UK.

== Background ==
In the late 1950s, concerns began to be raised over above-ground nuclear testing, which produced nuclear fallout that came down to earth in the rain. Such nuclear fallout contained radioactive Strontium-90 that can enter the food chain through the grass eaten by cows and finally into humans as food. Marches against nuclear testing were organized by Women for Peace and Women Strike for Peace in the 1960s, and Malvina Reynolds was among those active in the campaign.

Reynolds composed the song in 1962, first entitled "Rain Song", as part of the campaign and Reynolds performed the song in marches. The lyrics talk of grass and a little boy in the rain, both of whom disappear after years of such rain. Although the song is about radioactive fallout, later the song also became identified with acid rain.

Reynolds recorded the song, which was later included in a Smithsonian Folkways compilation album, The Best Of Broadside 1962-1988. Joan Baez recorded the song live for her album Joan Baez in Concert in 1962. Baez introduced the song as "the gentlest protest song I know. It doesn't protest gently, but it sounds gentle."

== The Searchers version ==
The most commercially successful version of the song was recorded by The Searchers. The song, released in 1964, was one of the earliest releases in mainstream pop that addressed issues of societal concern on the environment. It reached number 13 in the UK Singles Chart in 1965. It also reached number 29 on the U.S. Billboard chart, and number two in Canada.

=== Charts ===
Chart (1964–1965)	Peak position
Australia	27
Canada Top Singles (RPM)	2
Netherlands (Dutch Top 40)	25
UK Singles (Official Charts)	13
US Billboard Hot 100	29

== Other versions ==
It has been recorded by many other artists including Esther & Abi Ofarim on their album That's Our Song (1965), who also recorded a version in French, "Tout est étrange sous la pluie", the same year, The Seekers, Marianne Faithfull, and Melanie.

The song was recorded by the composer and issued by Columbia on the 1967 album Malvina Reynolds Sings the Truth (reissued on CD by Omni in 2008).

It was also covered by actress Lili Taylor in Nancy Savoca's film Dogfight.
