= Edison Award =

Dutch annual music prize

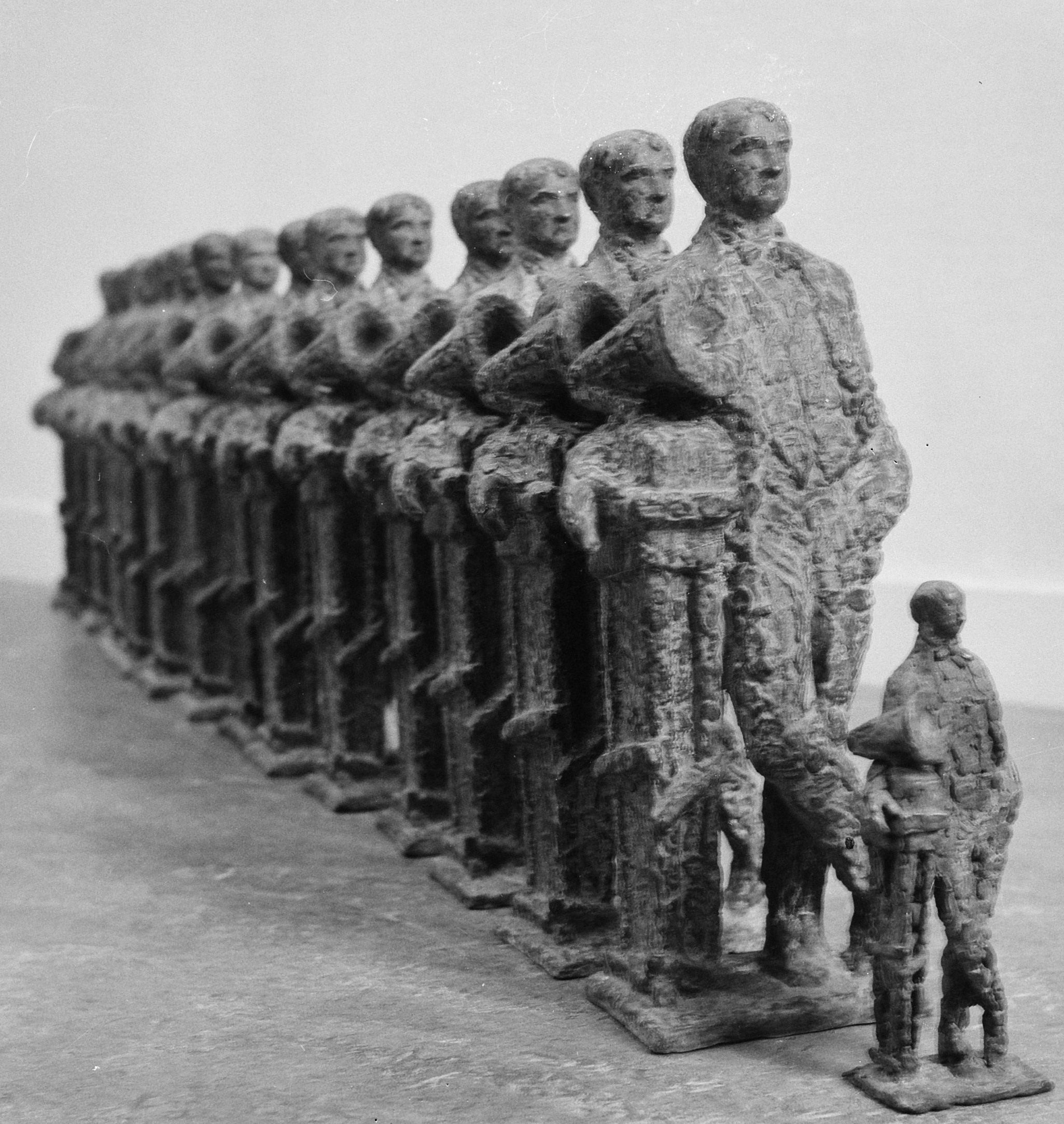
- Edison award 1961
- Awarded for: Outstanding achievements in the music industry
- Country: Netherlands
- Presented by: NVPI
- First award: October 22, 1960
- Website: edisons.nl

The Edison Award is an annual Dutch music prize awarded for outstanding achievements in the music industry. It is comparable to the American Grammy Award. The Edison award itself is a bronze replica of a statuette of Thomas Edison, designed by the Dutch sculptor Pieter d'Hont. It is one of the oldest music awards in the world, first presented in 1960 at the inaugural Grand Gala du Disque.

== Edisons ==
In 1960, the Committee for Collective Gramophone Campaigns organized the Edison awards for recordings in various categories. The first Edisons – named after the inventor of the phonograph, Thomas Edison – were awarded at the inaugural Grand Gala du Disque, a showcase for the awards featuring national and international performers. Coincidentally, Edison was of Dutch lineage. Each year, Edisons were awarded at two separate events, the Grand Gala du Disque Classique for classical music and the Grand Gala du Disque Populaire for popular music. There were two main categories: International artists and domestic (Dutch) artists, in various musical styles such as pop, vocal, jazz, instrumental, children and (in the early years) a separate award for French-language music. The winners were decided by judges.

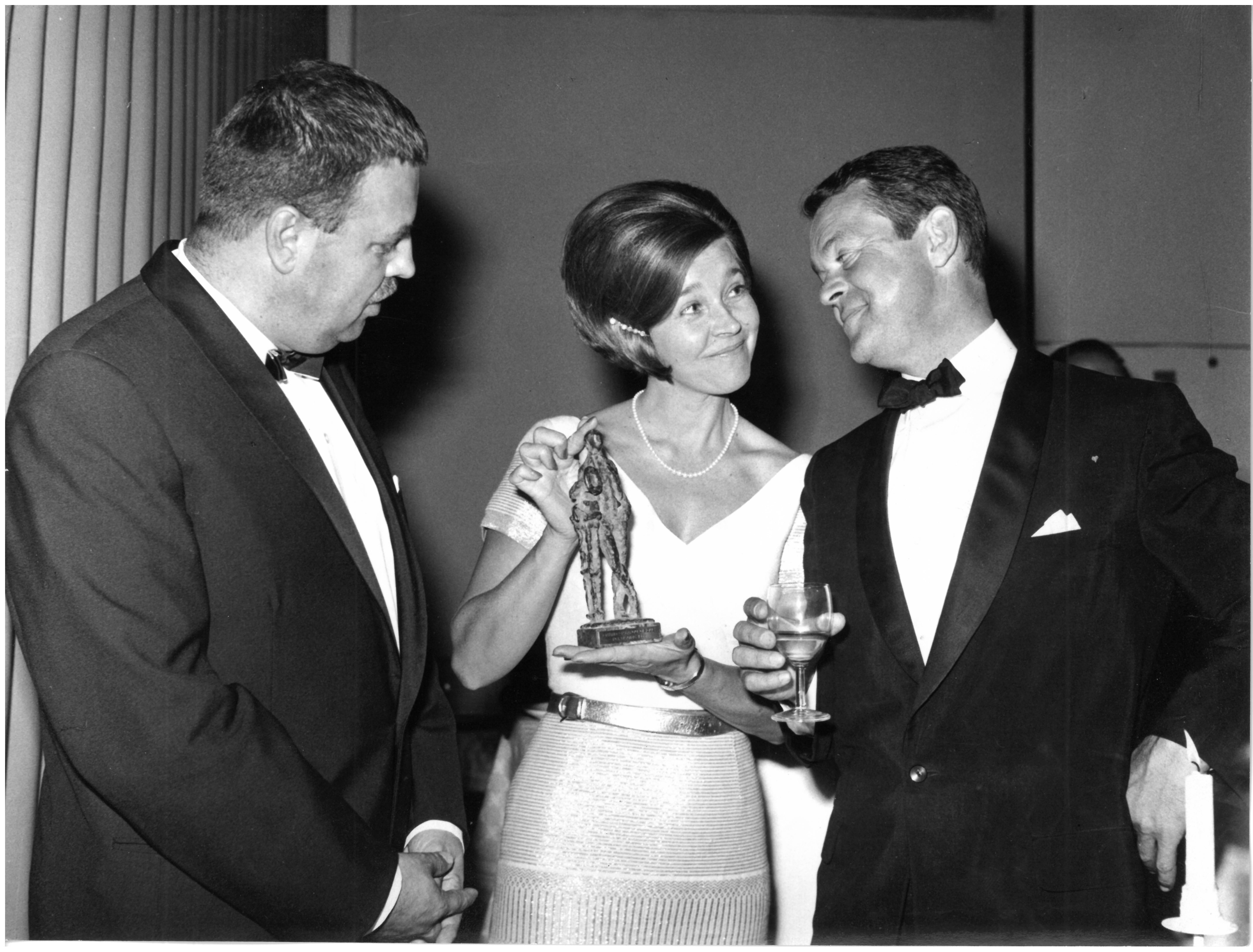
Sture Wahlberg (producer) with Alice Babs and Svend Asmussen and their Edison Award at the Grand Gala du Disque in 1965.

The 1963 Grand Gala du Disque Populaire, which overran by almost two hours, saw Marlene Dietrich, Sarah Vaughan and Charles Aznavour accepting an Edison. In 1965, the winners included Esther Ofarim, Oliver Nelson, Louis van Dijke, the Beatles and Joan Baez. Pianist Vladimir Horowitz and composer-conductor Igor Stravinsky won awards at the Grand Gala du Disque Classique.

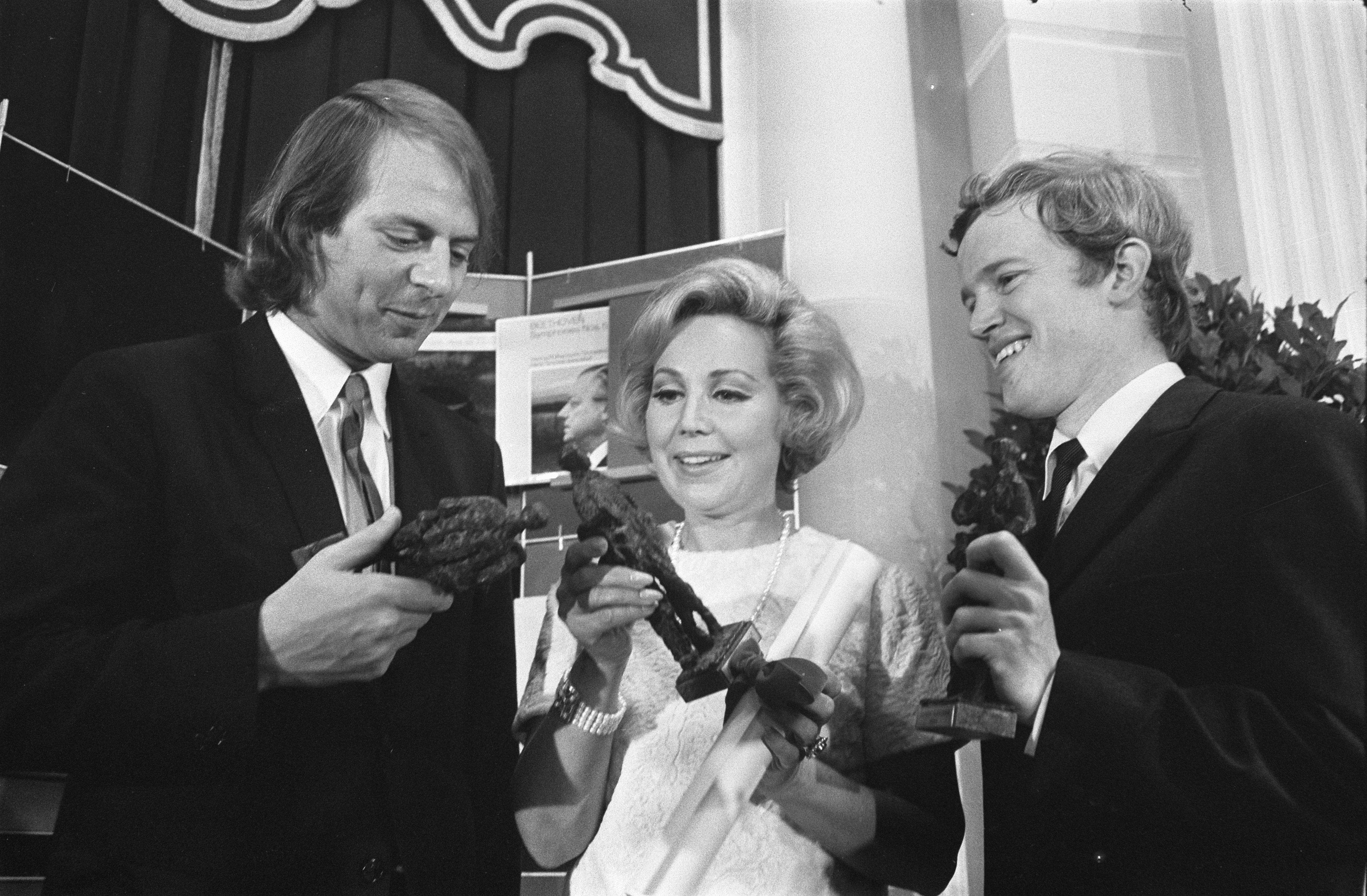
Karlheinz Stockhausen, Anneliese Rothenberger and Edo de Waart with their Edison awards at the Grand Gala du Disque Classique on October 3, 1969.

The award itself has also gone through many changes. In the 1960s and early 1970s, it grew to a (then) record number of 24 categories in 1969. In later years, the number of awards was inconsistent and several categories did not last longer than a couple of years. From 1975 to 1976 no Edisons were awarded and in 1977 only Dutch artists were awarded a prize. In 1980, the Classical and Popular were jointly awarded. While the award lost much of its prestige in the 1980s due to lack of media coverage and interest from record companies – the number of categories continued to grow to a record number of 35 in 1991. The choices became more progressive, as several award winners were virtually unknown to the general public. In 1991, for instance, no awards were given to best-selling and critically lauded albums, but instead lesser known artists like The Riverdogs, Michael Lee Firkins, rapper Paris and instrumentalist Jean Marc Zelwer got the prizes.

By the end of the 1990s, the Edison experienced another overhaul, as the prize was split into the Edison Pop and Edison Jazz/World awards (there had always been a separate Edison Classical Award ceremony). It also began to focus more on Dutch artists and a number of new categories were introduced, such as best album, video, single and newcomer. Each year also featured one or two awards which were directly voted for by the television audiences.

Interest in the Edison has gone up in recent years, although no awards were given in 2006 and 2007. These days, the award is focused on Dutch product only, with several categories such as best male artist, female artist, newcomer, and theatre/vocal artist. There is also an annual lifetime achievement award for an artist with a distinguished career. The 2011 ceremony, held on 2 October and which featured eight categories, was not televised.

== Award winners ==
From 1960 to 2011, over 750 Edison awards were handed out. The list of artists with most Edison wins is dominated by Dutch artists with relatively young careers. This is mainly because from the late 1990s, it has become much easier to win multiple awards in one year, which in the early days of the award was virtually impossible.

- Marco Borsato – 13 wins, from 1995 to 2011, including a lifetime achievement award in 2011 and five wins in the Best male artist category.
- Anouk – 11 wins, from 1998 to 2017, including three Edisons in her debut year (1998) and five awards in the Best female artist category.
- Herman van Veen – 8 wins, from 1970 to 2010, including a lifetime achievement award in 2010, two awards in the children's category and four in the Best male vocal category.
- BLØF – 7 wins, from 2000 to 2009, including five awards for Best group.
- Ilse DeLange – 6 wins, from 1999 to 2011, including four times as Best female artist.

Most wins for international artists

- Quincy Jones – 5 wins, from 1964 to 1979, in the jazz/instrumental and musical/film categories.
- Elvis Costello – 4 wins, from 1978 to 1999.
- Cliff Richard – 4 wins, from 1962 to 1998 (lifetime achievement award).
- Barbra Streisand – 4 wins, from 1964 to 1992.

Miles Davis, Beach Boys, Charles Aznavour, Emmylou Harris, Eric Clapton, Bob James, Paul Simon, Phil Collins, Ry Cooder, Stevie Wonder, U2 and Robbie Williams all had three Edison wins each. (Miles Davis and the Beach Boys were awarded an additional fourth Edison in 1966, but these were later scrapped as the list of winners had been leaked to the press prematurely and no awards were given that year).

=== Edison Pop Oeuvreprijs ===
- 1974 David Bowie
- 1998 Boudewijn de Groot
- 1998 Cliff Richard
- 1999 Toto
- 1999 Golden Earring
- 2000 André Hazes
- 2000 Status Quo
- 2001 BZN
- 2002 Simple Minds
- 2002 Rob de Nijs
- 2003 René Froger
- 2003 Mark Knopfler
- 2004 Frank Boeijen
- 2004 George Michael
- 2005 Phil Collins
- 2005 De Dijk
- 2006 Normaal
- 2009 Krezip
- 2010 Herman van Veen
- 2010 Rowwen Hèze
- 2011 Marco Borsato
- 2012 Doe Maar
- 2014 Youp van 't Hek
- 2014 BLØF
- 2016 Tiësto
- 2017 Anouk
- 2018 Extince
- 2019 Ilse DeLange
- 2020 Willeke Alberti

=== Edison Jazz/World Oeuvreprijs ===
- 1987 Earl Klugh
- 2006 Rita Reys
- 2007 Randy Crawford & Joe Sample
- 2008 Piet Noordijk
- 2008 Al Jarreau
- 2009 Dianne Reeves
- 2010 Chaka Khan
- 2011 Ivan Lins
- 2012 Dee Dee Bridgewater
- 2013 Marcus Miller
- 2014 Kurt Elling
- 2014 Greetje Kauffeld
- 2015 Malando Orkest
- 2015 Flairck
- 2016 Metropole Orkest
- 2017 Lee Towers
- 2017 Joshua Redman
- 2018 Patti Austin
- 2018 Angélique Kidjo
- 2019 Carel Kraayenhof
- 2019 Eliane Elias
- 2020 Eric Vloeimans
- 2020 Louis van Dijk

== Edison Classical Music Awards ==
The Edison Classical Music Awards (Edison Klassiek) are a collection of awards annually given to the best classical music recordings of the year. Awards are separately given in eleven categories. The award, part of the Edison Award, is issued from Amsterdam, the Netherlands.

=== Oeuvreprijs ===
- 2003 Anne Sofie von Otter
- 2004 Mstislav Rostropovich
- 2005 Thomas Hampson
- 2006 Jessye Norman
- 2007 John Williams
- 2008 Kiri Te Kanawa
- 2009 Beaux Arts Trio
- 2010 Pierre Boulez
- 2011 Daniel Barenboim
- 2012 Frans Brüggen
- 2013 Reinbert de Leeuw
- 2014 Netherlands Radio Philharmonic Orchestra
- 2015 Itzhak Perlman
- 2016 Bernard Haitink
- 2017 Ton Koopman
- 2018 Renée Fleming
- 2019 Kronos Quartet
- 2020 Roberta Alexander

=== 2003 ===
- Oeuvreprijs (lifetime achievement award): Anne Sofie von Otter
- Opera: Giuseppe Verdi Falstaff, Bryn Terfel, Thomas Hampson, Daniil Shtoda, and others, Berlin Philharmonic, conducted by Claudio Abbado
- Baroque music: Jean-Baptiste Lully Les Divertissements de Versailles, Les Arts Florissants conducted by William Christie
- Contemporary music: Luciano Berio Voci, Kim Kashkashian, Vienna Radio Symphony Orchestra conducted by Dennis Russell Davies
- Bijzondere Uitgaven van Historische Aard (special historical art): Joseph Haydn, Frédéric Chopin and others, Richter reDiscovered, Carnegie Hall recital Svjatoslav Richter BMG
- Concerts: Pyotr Ilyich Tchaikovsky and others, Violin Concertos Vadim Repin, Kirov Orchestra conducted by Valery Gergiev
- Solo recitals: Johann Sebastian Bach and others, Maxim Vengerov plays Bach, Rodion Shchedrin, Eugène Ysaÿe
- Chamber music: Ludwig van Beethoven Complete Violin Sonatas, Augustin Dumay, Maria João Pires
- Choir music: Igor Stravinsky, Lili Boulanger, Symphony of Psalms and others; Monteverdi Choir, London Symphony Orchestra conducted by John Eliot Gardiner
- Orchestral music: Mahler Symphony No. 5, Berlin Philharmonic conducted by Simon Rattle
- Vocal (solo): Vincenzo Bellini, Rossini and others, Bel Canto Renée Fleming, Orchestra of St. Luke's conducted by P. Summers
- Middle Ages and Renaissance (early music): Jan Pieterszoon Sweelinck The Complete keyboard works, Muziek Groep Nederland/Radio Wereldomroep Nederland
- Edison Nescafé Public award: Carel Kraayenhof, Tango Royal

=== 2016 ===
- Oeuvreprijs: Bernard Haitink
- Opera: René Jacobs, Mozart's Die Entführung aus dem Serail
- Instrumental soloist: Daniil Trifonov (Rachmaninov – Variations) – Universal Music, DG
- Vocal soloist: Sabine Devieilhe (Mozart – The Weber Sisters) – Warner Classics, Erato
- Debut: Lucas Debargue (Scarlatti / Chopin / Liszt / etc. – Lucas Debargue) – Sony Classical
- Chamber music: Quatuor Ébène (Schubert – String Quintet / Lieder) – Warner Music, Erato
- Orchestral music: Concentus Musicus Wien, Nikolaus Harnoncourt (Beethoven – Symphonies 4 & 5) – Sony Classical
- Choir music: Ensemble Pygmalion conducted by Raphaël Pichon (Wagner / Brahms / Schumann – Rheinmädchen) – [PIAS] The Netherlands, Harmonia Mundi
- De ontdekking [The discovery]: Barbara Hannigan, Bavarian Radio Symphony Orchestra conducted by Andris Nelsons (Abrahamsen – Let Me Tell You) – [PIAS] Holland Harmony Mundi, Winter & Winter
