= The Lonesome Road =

1927 song

"The Lonesome Road" is a 1927 song with music by Nathaniel Shilkret and lyrics by Gene Austin, alternately titled "Lonesome Road", "Look Down that Lonesome Road" and "Lonesome Road Blues." It was written in the style of an African American folk song.

== Background ==
Author Dorothy Scarborough writes about this song in her book,"On the Trail of Negro Folk-Songs", published by Harvard University Press, Cambridge, Mass., in September, 1925. She says the song was sent to her by Evelyn Cary Williams, of Lynchburg, Virginia, who says "it was taken down from the singing of Charles Galoway, a black man, uneducated, a worker on the roads in Virginia." Scarborough set out the melody and two verses of the song in her book, but says it "is difficult to place with respect to time. It may be a genuine Negro ballad, or it may be one remembered from the singing of the whites."

Composer Harold L. Walters included his arrangement of "The Lonesome Road (Negro Folk Song)" in his "Special Arrangement Band Book," published by Rubank, Inc., Miami Florida. He attached a note to his arrangement, "Used by permission, from "On the Trail of Negro Folk-Songs" by Dorothy Scarborough, published by Harvard University Press, Cambridge, Mass."

The lyricist and composer were both extremely popular recording artists. Gene Austin estimated he sold 80 million records, and Nathaniel Shilkret's son estimated his father sold 50 million records. Joel Whitburn lists recordings by Austin, Bing Crosby, Ted Lewis, and Shilkret (see list of recordings below) as being "charted" at Numbers 10, 12, 3 and 10, respectively. There are no reliable sales figures that can be used to verify or dispute any of the estimates above.

== Genres ==
"Lonesome Road" has been recorded in the jazz, gospel, blues, big band and dance music genres. There is a hint of humor in the Louis Armstrong and Hoyt Axton recordings, and the Dean Elliot recording is notable for its unusual sound effects, provided by Phil Kaye. The Keith Textor album was made by RCA to demonstrate sound effects using stereo; the "Lonesome Road" track demonstrates someone snapping their fingers and whistling, going from left to right and then back. The Wilbur Bradley recording contains a short passage identifiable as "Lonesome Road" at the beginning, with the remainder of the recording being a drum solo by Bradley's co-leader Ray McKinley. The Ivory and Gold recording features a flute solo.

In some jazz recordings, such as the one by Morris Grants, which credits Austin—Shilkret, the jazz improvisation is so dominant that the relation to the Austin—Shilkret Lonesome Road, if any, is obscure. The Montenegro recording is licensed, but here also the relation to the Austin—Shilkret song is obscure.

Many of the recordings are usable for dancing. The Sid Phillips recording is excellent for (International Style) foxtrot, and the Madeleine Peyroux recording is also suitable for foxtrot. The recording by The Fashions is a quickstep. The Hoyt Axton recording is a good jive. Quite a few of the recordings are usable for East Coast Swing, and the Floyd Cramer recording is suitable for West Coast Swing. The twist could be danced to the recordings by Lyndstadt and the Collins Kids. The Chantays' recording has a cha cha beat.

== Recordings (mechanicals) ==
It was initially recorded September 16, 1927, by Austin, accompanied by Shilkret directing the Victor Orchestra. There have been over two hundred recordings of "Lonesome Road," including versions by Frank Sinatra, Louis Armstrong, Sister Rosetta Tharpe, the Boswell Sisters (recorded April 27, 1934), Bing Crosby (recorded December 12, 1938), Ted Lewis, Stevie Wonder, Sam Cooke, Ace Cannon, Chris Connor, Dick Dale, Willie Nelson, and Tuba Skinny.

A version by Frankie Laine was number 48 on the Canadian CHUM Chart on April 7, 1958.

Esther & Abi Ofarim recorded the song in 1967 for their album 2 In 3. It was issued as a single B-side single to "Cinderella Rockefella" on Philips Records.

Ella Fitzgerald and Andy Williams performed a duet on the variety TV series The Andy Williams Show on January 1, 1967.

Swedish singer Anni-Frid Lyngstad recorded a cover version titled "När du blir min" (English: When You’ll Be Mine), with Swedish lyrics written by Olle Bergman. As a B-side to her 1968 single for EMI Records, "Mycket kär", Lyngstad's version was arranged in a sped-up fashion and pronounced swing manner, compared to recordings by other artists. In November 1968, the single was ranked No. 11 in a music chart Toppentipset, as published by Expressen. Bob Dylan borrowed the melody and a few lines for his song "Sugar Baby", on his 2001 album Love & Theft.

== Use in film and live performances ==
The composition was notably used as a substitute for Ol' Man River in the finale of the part-talkie 1929 film version of Edna Ferber's novel Show Boat. It was performed onscreen by Stepin Fetchit as the deckhand Joe. Fetchit's singing voice was supplied by bass-baritone Jules Bledsoe, who had played Joe in the original stage version of the musical. The Shilkret autobiography contains a brief account of the motivation for using the song in the film.

The song was also used in the motion pictures Submarine Command (1951), Cha-Cha-Cha Boom! (1956) (performed by the Mary Kaye Trio), California Split (1974), Wild Man Blues (1997), Crazy (2007) (performed by Madeleine Peyroux), and Green Book (2018). It was featured on two soundies, one with the Lucky Millinder orchestra, with vocal by Sister Rosetta Tharpe, and another with the Al Donahue Orchestra.

It was used in the television series The Andy Griffith Show (Rafe Hollister Sings, episode 83), Peter Gunn (The Dummy), Gomer Pyle, U.S.M.C. (Gomer Says `Hey', episode 97), Matlock (Class), and The Odd Couple (Rent Strike, episode 107). "Lonesome Road" was included in the television productions Vintage Sinatra (PBS, 2003), Now (with David Brancaccio, 2005), and Smuckers Presents Kurt Browning's Gotta Skate (2006), and in the Radio City Music Hall production Frank Sinatra: His Voice, His World, His Way (2004).

== Sources ==
- Bradley, Edwin M., The First Hollywood Musicals: A Critical Filmography, McFarland, 2004, p. 166. ISBN 0-7864-2029-4
- Parish, James Robert and Pitts, Michael R., Hollywood Songsters: Singers who Act and Actors who Sing: a Biographical Dictionary, 2nd Edition, Routledge, 2003, p. 56. ISBN 0-415-94332-9
- Shilkret, Nathaniel, ed. Niel Shell and Barbara Shilkret, Nathaniel Shilkret: Sixty Years in the Music Business, Scarecrow Press, Lanham, Md., 2005. ISBN 0-8108-5128-8
- Whitburn, Joel, Pop Memories 1890—1954, Record Research, Menomonee Falls, WI, 1986. ISBN 0-89820-083-0
