= The Water Is Wide (song) =

Folk song

Song
- Written: Traditional
- Published: 1906
- Genre: Folk

"The Water Is Wide" or "The Water Is Deep" (also called "O Waly, Waly" or simply "Waly, Waly") is a folk song of British origin. It remains popular in the 21st century. Cecil Sharp published the song in Folk Songs From Somerset (1906).

== Themes and construction ==
The imagery of the lyrics describes the challenges of love: "Love is handsome, love is kind" during the novel honeymoon phase of any relationship. However, as time progresses, "love grows old, and waxes cold". Even true love, the lyrics say, can "fade away like morning dew".

The modern lyric for "The Water Is Wide" was consolidated and named by Cecil Sharp in 1906 from multiple older sources in southern England, following English lyrics with very different stories and styles but the same meter. Earlier sources were frequently published as broadsheets without music. Performers or publishers would insert, remove, and adapt verses from one piece to another: floating verses are also characteristic of hymns and blues verses. Lyrics from different sources could be used with different melodies of the same metre. Consequently, each verse in the modern song may not have been originally composed in the context of its surrounding verses nor be consistent in theme.

== Variants ==
"The Water Is Wide" may be considered a family of lyrics with a particular hymn-like tune.

"O Waly Waly" (Wail, Wail) may be sometimes a particular lyric, sometimes a family tree of lyrics, sometimes "Jamie Douglas", sometimes one melody or another with the correct meter, and sometimes versions of the modern compilation "The Water Is Wide" (usually with the addition of the verse starting "O Waly, Waly"). Benjamin Britten used the melody and verses of "The Water Is Wide" for his arrangement – which does not have the "O Waly, Waly" verse, yet is titled "Waly, Waly". A different melody is used for the song "When Cockleshells turn Silver Bells" also subtitled "Waly, Waly". Yet another melody for "O Waly, Waly" is associated with the song, "Jamie Douglas" lyric.

=== Ancestors ===
A key ancestor is the lyric "Waly, Waly, Gin Love Be Bonny" from Ramsay's "Tea Table Miscellany" (1724), given below. This is a jumble of verses from other lyrics including "Arthur's Seat shall be my Bed" (1701), "The Distressed Virgin" (1633) and the Scottish scandal ballad "Jamie Douglas" (1776).

The use of 'cockleshells' and 'silver bells' in Thomson's version (1725) pre-dates the earliest published "Mary, Mary, Quite Contrary" (1744) and may relate to torture.

Some though not all versions of "Jamie Douglas" have the first verse that starts "O, Waly, Waly". Andrew Lang found a variant verse in Ramsay's "Tea Table Miscellany" from a 16th-century song.

=== Cousins ===
Predecessors of "The Water Is Wide" also influenced lyrics for other folk and popular songs, such as the modern version of the Irish "Carrickfergus" (1960s) and the American "Sweet Peggy Gordan" (1880). The Irish folk song "Carrickfergus" shares the lines "but the sea is wide/I cannot swim over/And neither have I wings to fly". This song may be preceded by an Irish language song whose first line A Bhí Bean Uasal ("It was a noble woman") matches closely the opening line of one known variation of Lord Jamie Douglas: "I was a lady of renown". However, the content of the English-language "Carrickfergus" includes material clearly from the Scots/English songs not in any known copy of A Bhí Bean Uasal suggesting considerable interplay among all known traditions. The Welsh version is called "Mae'r môr yn faith".

It is related to Child Ballad 204 (Roud number 87), "Jamie Douglas", which in turn refers to the ostensibly unhappy first marriage of James Douglas, 2nd Marquis of Douglas, to Lady Barbara Erskine.

=== Descendants ===
The modern "The Water Is Wide" was popularized by Pete Seeger in the folk revival. There have been multiple subsequent variations of the song and several names – including "Waly, Waly", "There is a Ship", and "Cockleshells" – which use and re-use different selections of lyrics. The song "Van Diemen's Land" on the album Rattle and Hum by U2 uses a variation of the melody of "The Water Is Wide".

The song "When the Pipers Play", sung by Isla St. Clair on the video of the same name, uses the melody of "The Water Is Wide".

Graeme Allwright translated the song into French. It was recorded in Breton language by Tri Yann as "Divent an dour". In 1991, the French singer Renaud recorded it as "La ballade nord-irlandaise" (The Ballad of Northern Ireland). At the Dunkerque carnival, people sing "putain d'Islande" based on the same melody.

Neil Young's "Mother Earth (Natural Anthem)" uses the melody of "The Water Is Wide".

== Later renditions ==
=== Arrangements ===
"O Waly, Waly" has been a popular choice for arrangements by classical composers, in particular Benjamin Britten, whose arrangement for voice and piano was published in 1948. John Rutter uses it for the Third Movement in his "Suite for Strings" (1973).

The tune is often used for the hymn "When I Survey the Wondrous Cross" by Isaac Watts. It is also the tune for John Bell's "When God Almighty came to Earth" (1987) and F. Pratt Green's "An Upper Room did our Lord Prepare" (1974).

Because the melody is consistent with the words of Adon Olam, a prayer closing most modern Jewish services, Susan Colin performed a version with an also-revised prayer. One congregation's choir performed it with the standard Hebrew prayer. One instrumental version is consistent with the stanzas of the prayer.

=== Recordings ===
Esther & Abi Ofarim recorded "Oh Waly Waly" in 1963 for their album Songs Der Welt, and for their live concert album in 1969. Esther re-released the song on the box-set CD Mein Weg zu mir in 1999. Jazz singer Tina May recorded the song—as "Whaley Whaley"—with pianist Nikki Iles and saxophonist Alan Barnes on their 2000 album One Fine Day.

Bob Dylan recorded a version of "The Water is Wide" during the recording sessions for his album Time Out of Mind in 1996, perhaps intended for use on a then soon-to-be-released multi-artist Pete Seeger tribute album. This rendition was first released to the public on the Fragments album in 2023.

Japanese guitarist Keizo Ishibashi's 2025 instrumental version of "The Water is Wide" featured the use of a hand-turned drone wheel affixed to the face of the guitar, offering a sound similar to bagpipe or pipe organ.

== In popular culture ==
=== Television ===
The CBS TV series The Unit featured an episode in season 2 titled "The Water is Wide", in which Unit members must disarm a bomb in the office of the Secretary-General of the United Nations, while their wives seek an alleged POW/MIA soldier in Vietnam.

=== Films ===
- Jerry Goldsmith arranged the song for orchestra for the main titles of his score for the 1994 action film The River Wild, and the Cowboy Junkies also recorded a version of the song for the end credits.
- Gerard Way covered the song for Kevin Smith's film Tusk. Smith reused this version of the song for his film Clerks III.
- PJ Harvey recorded this song in 2014 for the second season of BBC Two's Peaky Blinders.
- Performed by John Rutter and the Cambridge Singers, the song features in Isobel Waller-Bridge's score for the 2020 film Emma.
- Jessica Chapnik Kahn and Nadav Kahn recorded the song for the 2022 Australian film Everything in Between, where it features in the closing moments and end credits.

=== Books ===
- Alice Hoffman includes the song in Magic Lessons; the first book chronologically in the Practical Magic series, and the third book to be published.
