= Chris and Conrad =

- Origin: Lakeland, Florida, U.S.
- Genres: CCM, pop rock
- Years active: 2007-2010
- Label: VSR Music Group

Chris and Conrad were an American contemporary Christian music duo from Lakeland, Florida, consisting of Chris Kuti and Conrad Johnson. In early 2009 the duo was named the "#2 Artist You Oughta Know" by CCM Magazine. "Lead Me to the Cross", a radio version of the worship song written by Brooke Fraser, was released in early 2009 as their first single. In August 2009, it reached #3 on Billboard magazine's top Christian Songs chart. "Lead Me to the Cross" was also their first #1 song on the Christian Radio Weekly Inspirational Chart on May 18, 2009, as well as the #1 song on the Billboard Soft AC/Inspirational Chart from July 20 to August 10, 2009.

The duo's self-titled debut album, Chris and Conrad, was released May 5, 2009 and was co-produced by Kuti, Johnson, and David Garcia. It features a 30-minute documentary on the making of the project including video of the songwriting sessions for the album. The second single from the debut project, "You're the One" was released in late 2009 and was preceded by a short-form video directed by Jon Ward (tobyMac, Third Day, Newsboys) of Jonny Grand Films and Media.

== History ==
Chris and Conrad came together as a rock duo in 2007 after being introduced to one another as solo artists and potential co-writers. At the time, they were both being managed by Jeff Adams of 2:20 Entertainment Group. Chris and Conrad soon joined and after writing a collection of songs together, Adams pitched them to a number of labels in Nashville. EMI-distributed VSR Music Group signed them to a multi-record contract and they immediately began recording the debut project. Kuti is the co-founder of the Tampa Bay area outreach "Late Nite" and contributed the single "We Want the World to Hear" on Big Daddy Weave's 2008 release What Life Would Be Like. The duo's connection with Big Daddy Weave also includes a collaboration with the band's lead vocalist Mike Weaver on "Who I Really Am" for Chris and Conrad's self-titled release.

The band is no longer touring together. Chris and Conrad split as of some time in November, 2010.

Chris Kuti and his wife, Mary, are currently the Global Worship Pastors at Lakepointe Church in Rockwall, Texas.

== Discography ==
- Chris and Conrad (2009)
