= One More Dance =

Song written by C. C. Carter

"One More Dance (Your Husband Is Worse)"
- Dutch picture sleeve

Single by Esther Ofarim & Abraham
- B-side: "Freight Train"
- Released: December 1963
- Genre: Folk
- Length: 2:30
- Label: Philips
- Songwriter: Carter

Esther Ofarim & Abraham singles chronology
"Lay-La" (1963)	"One More Dance (Your Husband Is Worse)" (1963)	"Schönes Mädchen" (1964)

"Noch einen Tanz"
- German picture sleeve

Single by Esther & Abi Ofarim

from the album Noch Einen Tanz
- B-side: "Wenn ich bei dir sein kann"
- Released: September 1964
- Genre: Schlager
- Length: 2:54
- Label: Philips
- Songwriters: Carter, G. Francropolus (Nach Einer Volksweise)

Esther & Abi Ofarim singles chronology
"Schönes Mädchen" (1964)	"Noch einen Tanz" (1964)	"Ich Frag' Mich, Was Wird Aus Mir" (1965)

"One More Dance" is a song written by C. C. Carter. It is a satirical song about cynical lovers. It was first recorded by South African singer Miriam Makeba with Charles Colman for her debut album Miriam Makeba (1960). Makeba performed the song live with American singer Harry Belafonte at Carnegie Hall in 1960. Their duet was released on his album Belafonte Returns to Carnegie Hall (1960). Israeli folk duo Esther & Abi Ofarim recorded popular renditions of the song in different languages.

== Esther & Abi Ofarim versions ==
"One More Dance"
- German picture sleeve

Single by Esther & Abi Ofarim

from the album Up To Date
- B-side: "Gone Home"
- Released: June 1968
- Genre: Folk; pop
- Length: 2:40
- Label: Philips
- Songwriters: Carter (uncredited), Musek, Ball

Esther & Abi Ofarim singles chronology
"Cinderella Rockefella" (1968)	"One More Dance" (1968)	"Never Grow Old" (1968)

Husband-and-wife duo Esther & Abi Ofarim first recorded their rendition of "One More Dance" in Hebrew, "Od riqud echad," which was released on their album Foibles and Fables in Israel in 1962.

In 1963, they recorded a version released as "One More Dance (Your Husband Is Worse)" in Denmark and the Netherlands. The recording is credited to Esther Ofarim and Abraham. The label on the record has the single titled "One More Dance (Darling Go Home)."

Also in 1963, the duo recorded a rendition of the song in French as "Encore Une Danse." Released as a single in Canada in December 1963, the single charted over a year later in February 1965.

In 1964, the duo recorded the song in German as "Noch einen Tanz" for the album Noch Einen Tanz. The single charted in Germany and Austria in 1966. The B-side "Wenn ich bei dir sein kann" is a German version of "Cotton Fields."

Following the success of "Cinderella Rockefella" in 1968, another rendition of "One More Dance" was released with accompaniment directed by Wally Scott. This version, from the album Up To Date, peaked at No. 13 on the UK Singles chart.

== Chart performance ==
Esther & Abi Ofarim
Release date	Title	Chart	Peak position
1963	"One More Dance (Your Husband Is Worse)"	Netherlands (Dutch Top 40)	8
1963	"Encore Une Danse"	Canada (Best Sellers)	30
1964	"Noch einen Tanz"	Germany (GfK Entertainment)	32
1964	"Noch einen Tanz"	Austria (Ö3 Austria Top 40)	6
1968	"One More Dance"	UK Singles (Official Charts)	13
