= Sing Hallelujah (Mike Settle song) =

- German picture sleeve

Single by Esther & Abi Ofarim

from the album Das Neue Esther & Abi Ofarim Album
- B-side: "I'm Going Home"
- Released: 1966
- Genre: Folk
- Length: 2:42
- Label: Philips
- Songwriter(s): Mike Settle

Esther & Abi Ofarim singles chronology
"Les Trois Cloches" (1965)	"Sing Hallelujah" (1966)	"Die Wahrheit (Die Fahrt ins Heu)" (1966)

"Sing Hallelujah"
- Italian picture sleeve

Single by Judy Collins
- A-side: "Crow on the Cradle"
- Released: 1967
- Label: Vedette Records
- Songwriter(s): Mike Settle

"Sing Hallelujah" is a folk song written by Mike Settle and originally recorded on the album Folk Sing Hallelujah (1961) by Mike Settle and the Settlers. It has been recorded on singles by Jeannie Hoffman 1964, The Upper U. District Singers 1964, Liverpool's The Remo Four 1967, and Germany's The Lords 1966. Israeli duo Esther & Abi Ofarim recorded a rendition which reached No. 30 in Germany in 1966. In 1967, a version by Judy Collins was released as a b-side single in Italy from her album Golden Apples of the Sun (1962).
