= That's Our Song =

Studio album by Esther & Abi Ofarim
- Released: October 1965
- Genre: Folk; pop; world
- Label: Philips

Esther & Abi Ofarim chronology
Melodie Einer Nacht (1965)	That's Our Song (1965)	Noch Einen Tanz (1966)

Singles from That's Our Song
- 1. "Don't Think Twice, It's All Right" Released: 1965; 2. "That's My Song" Released: 1965; 3. "Les Trois Cloches" Released: 1966

Professional ratings
Review scores
Source	Rating
Record Mirror	3/5 stars

That's Our Song is an album released by Israeli folk duo Esther & Abi Ofarim. It was released in Europe on Philips Records in 1965. The album was released as Neue Songs Der Welt (New Songs of the World) in Germany.

== Recording and release ==
On this album arranged and conducted by Heinz Alisch, Esther & Abi Ofarim cover various international folk recordings, including songs by Bob Dylan, Peter, Paul and Mary, and the Negro spiritual "Go Tell It on the Mountain." The track "La Guajira" is a rendition of "Al vaivén de mi carreta" by Cuban musician Ñico Saquito.

The album was at the top of the German Album chart by December 1965. Neue Songs Der Welt was the first of three No. 1 albums for the duo in Germany. The album spent a total of 80 weeks on the charts (October 15, 1965 – May 15, 1967), including 56 weeks in the Top 10 and 12 weeks at the top of the chart.

== Track listing ==
Side A
No.	Title	Writer(s)	Length
1.	"That's My Song"	Tomsco	2:56
2.	"Hush-A-Bye"	Peter Yarrow, Paul Stookey	2:45
3.	"La Guajira"		2:10
4.	"Don't Think Twice, It's All Right"	Bob Dylan	2:20
5.	"Les Trois Cloches"	Jean Villard	3:18
6.	"He's Mine"	Angela Martin, Bobby Scott	2:06

Side B
No.	Title	Writer(s)	Length
1.	"Go Tell It on the Mountain"		3:00
2.	"Another Man"		3:00
3.	"Shtematy"	Yedidya Admon	2:33
4.	"900 Miles from My Home"		2:40
5.	"Drunten Im Tale (Down In The Valley)"	Daniel Martina	2:48
6.	"What Have They Done to the Rain"	Malvina Reynolds	1:43

== Chart performance ==
Neue Songs Der Welt
Chart	Peak position
Germany (GfK Entertainment)	1
