= Chris and Conrad (album) =

2009 studio album by Chris and Conrad

Studio album by Chris and Conrad
- Released: May 5, 2009
- Genre: CCM
- Length: 42:52
- Label: VSR Music Group
- Producer: Chris Kuti: Conrad Johnson; David Rivilla Garcia

Singles from Chris and Conrad
- 1. "Lead Me to the Cross" Released: Early 2009; 2. "You're the One" Released: Late 2009; 3. "Let It Out" Released: Late August 2010

Chris and Conrad is Chris and Conrad's only studio album, released on May 5, 2009 through VSR Music Group. The first single from the album is their cover of Brooke Fraser's "Lead Me to the Cross". The second single is "You're the One".

== Track listing ==
All tracks are written by Chris Kuti and Conrad Johnson, except where noted.

No.	Title	Lyrics	Length
1.	"You're the One"		3:40
2.	"Rescue"		3:44
3.	"Lead Me to the Cross"	Brooke Fraser	3:42
4.	"Always There"	Johnson, Kuti, Jeff Pardo	3:24
5.	"Buried Alive"		4:27
6.	"Ignition (Interlude)"		0:51
7.	"Love Revolution"	Johnson, Kuti, Douglas Kaine McKelvey	3:44
8.	"Sing Hallelujah"		4:00
9.	"Breathe Your Life"		3:17
10.	"Let It Out"	Johnson, Kuti, Pardo	3:58
11.	"Who I Really Am"		3:49
12.	"I'm At Home"	Johnson	4:16
Total length:			42:52

== Personnel ==
- Chris Kuti – vocals, acoustic guitars, guitars
- Conrad Johnson – vocals, keyboards, programming, acoustic guitars, guitars, strings

Additional musicians

- David Rivilla Garcia – keyboards, programming, acoustic guitars, electric guitars, bass, backing vocals
- Tommy Platt – electric guitars
- Davy Mason – bass
- Stephen Swenson – strings
