= Esther Ofarim =

Israeli singer (born 1941)

Esther Ofarim אסתר עופרים
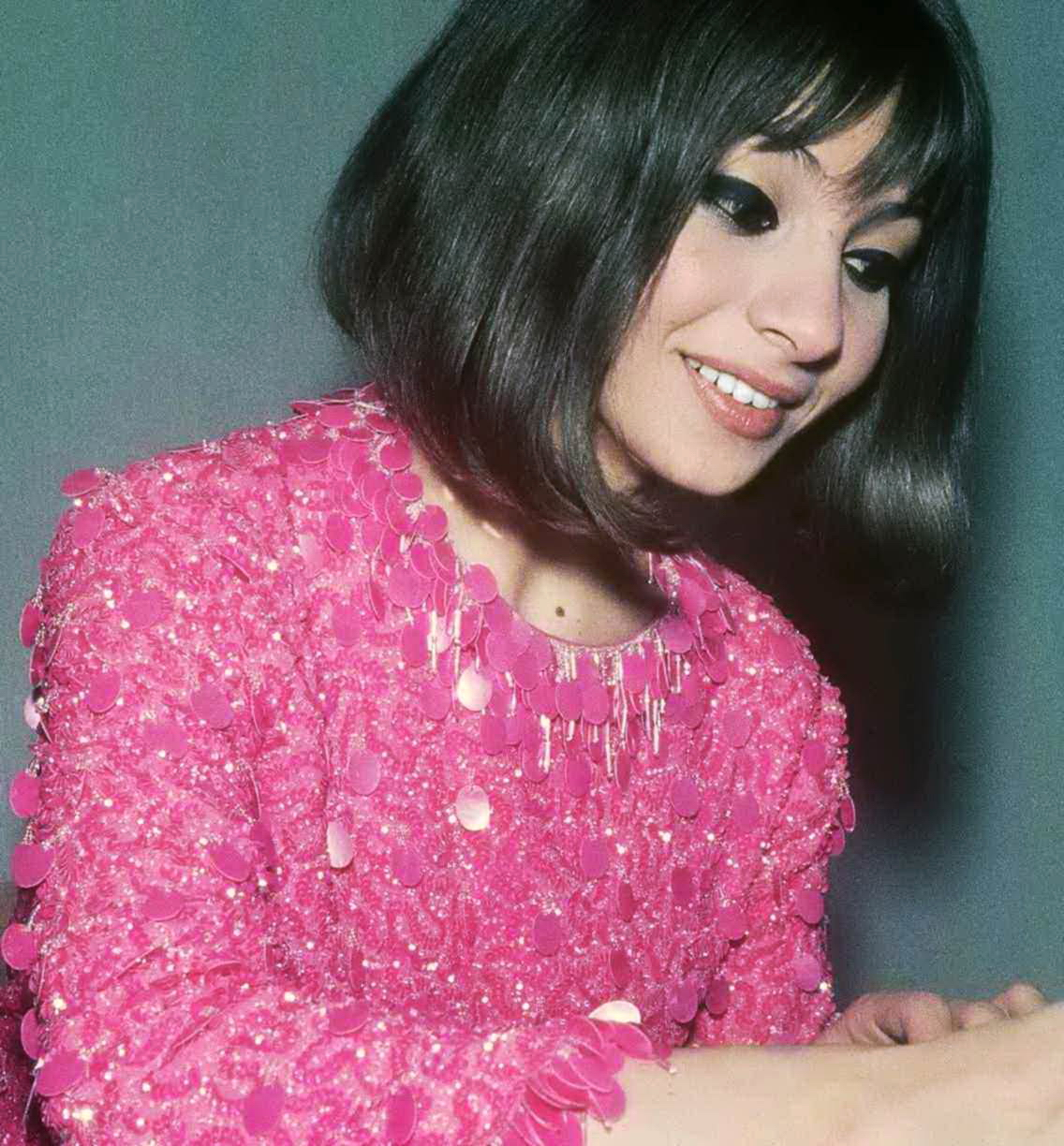
- Ofarim in 1966

Background information
- Also known as: Esther Reichstadt
- Born: Esther Zaied; June 13, 1941 (age 85); Safed, Mandatory Palestine
- Genres: Folk, pop, Israeli
- Occupations: Singer; songwriter; musician
- Years active: 1959–present
- Labels: Hed Arzi, Israphon, Philips, EMI, Mercury
- Website: www.esther-ofarim.de

Esther Zaied, better known by her married name Esther Ofarim (Hebrew: אסתר עופרים; born June 13, 1941), is an Israeli singer. She came second in the Eurovision Song Contest 1963 with the song "T'en va pas", representing Switzerland. After marrying Abi Ofarim in 1958, she was half of the husband-and-wife folk duo Esther & Abi Ofarim in the 1960s. After the couple divorced, she undertook a successful solo career.

== Life and career ==
=== Beginnings ===
Esther Zaied was born in Safed to a Syrian Jewish family. She began performing as a child, singing Hebrew and international folk songs. In 1958, Esther met Abi Ofarim, a guitarist and dancer, who she later married. She was a student in his dance studio in Haifa. Esther served four months in the Israeli Army before she was discharged owing to her marriage to Abi.

American director Otto Preminger cast Esther for a small role in the film Exodus (1960). In 1960, Esther landed the role of Katzia in the play The Legend of Three and Four at the Habima Theatre. In 1961, she won first at Israel's first pop song festival in Tel Aviv, where she sang "Saëni Imchá Bemachol" (Take Me with You When You Dance) and "Naamah", written by Pnina and Tsvi Avni, accompanied by Kol Yisrael orchestra under Gary Bertini.

In 1962, Esther released her self-titled debut solo album and was invited to join Frank Sinatra in his performances in Israel. Kol Yisrael radio then sent her to the Sopot International Song Festival in Poland. She came in second place for singing "Stav", written by Moshe Wilensky and Shimshon Halfi.

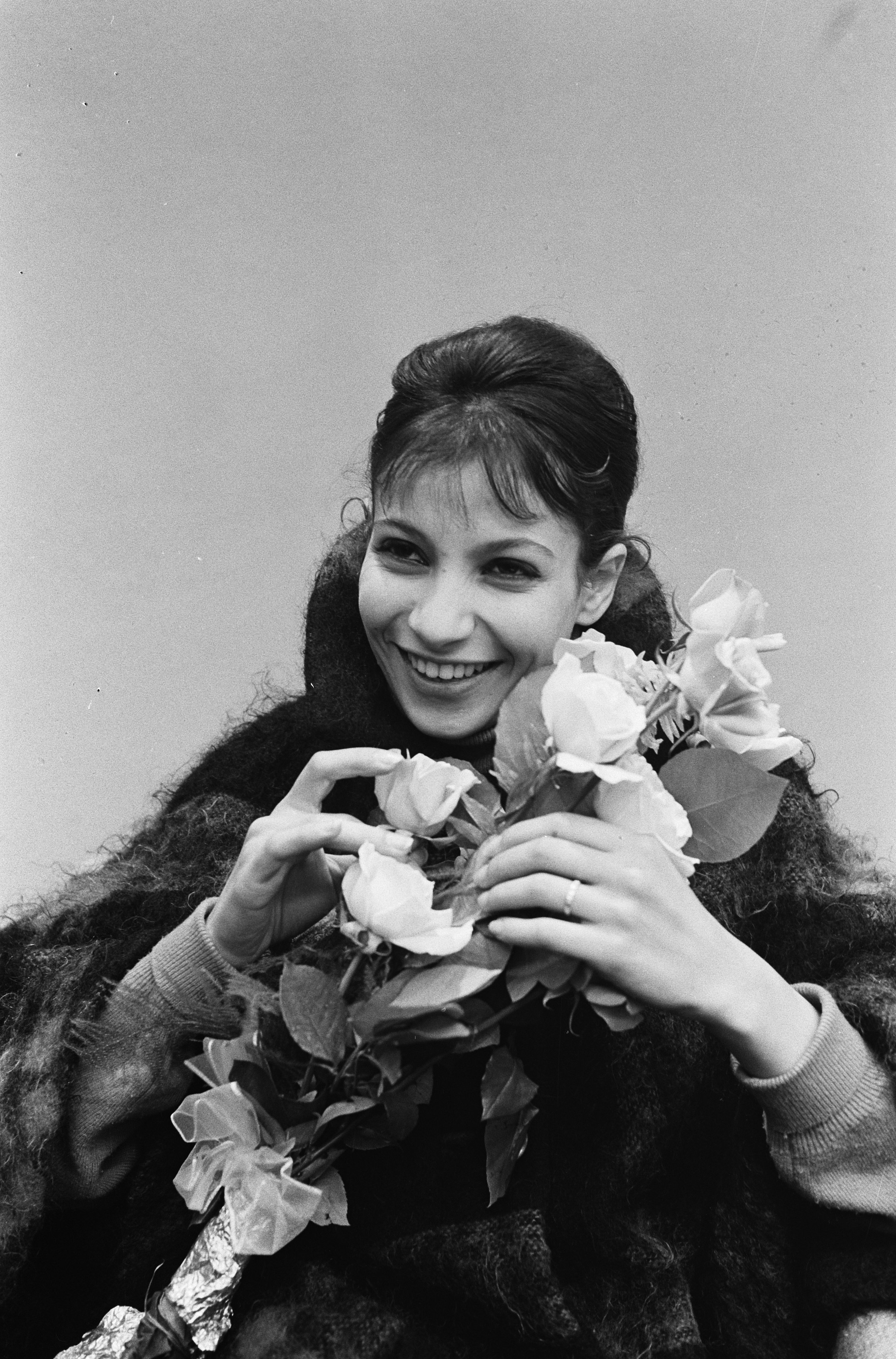
Esther Ofarim in the Netherlands for Grand Gala du Disque performance (1963)

=== Eurovision 1963 ===
Esther and Abi settled in Geneva, Switzerland, where she took part in the Eurovision Song Contest 1963 representing Switzerland with the song "T'en va pas". In a very close and controversial competition with the Danish duo Grethe and Jørgen Ingmann, her song placed second. Initially it appeared Switzerland had won the contest with 42 points to Denmark's 40, but after an apparent change to the Norwegian scores, Ofarim ended up with 40 points, as opposed to 42 points for "Dansevise", a reversal of the initial result.

"T'en va pas" was released as single on Philips Records in 1963, reaching No. 39 in Germany.

In 1963, Esther had a starring role in the German film Es war mir ein Vergnügen.

=== Esther & Abi Ofarim ===
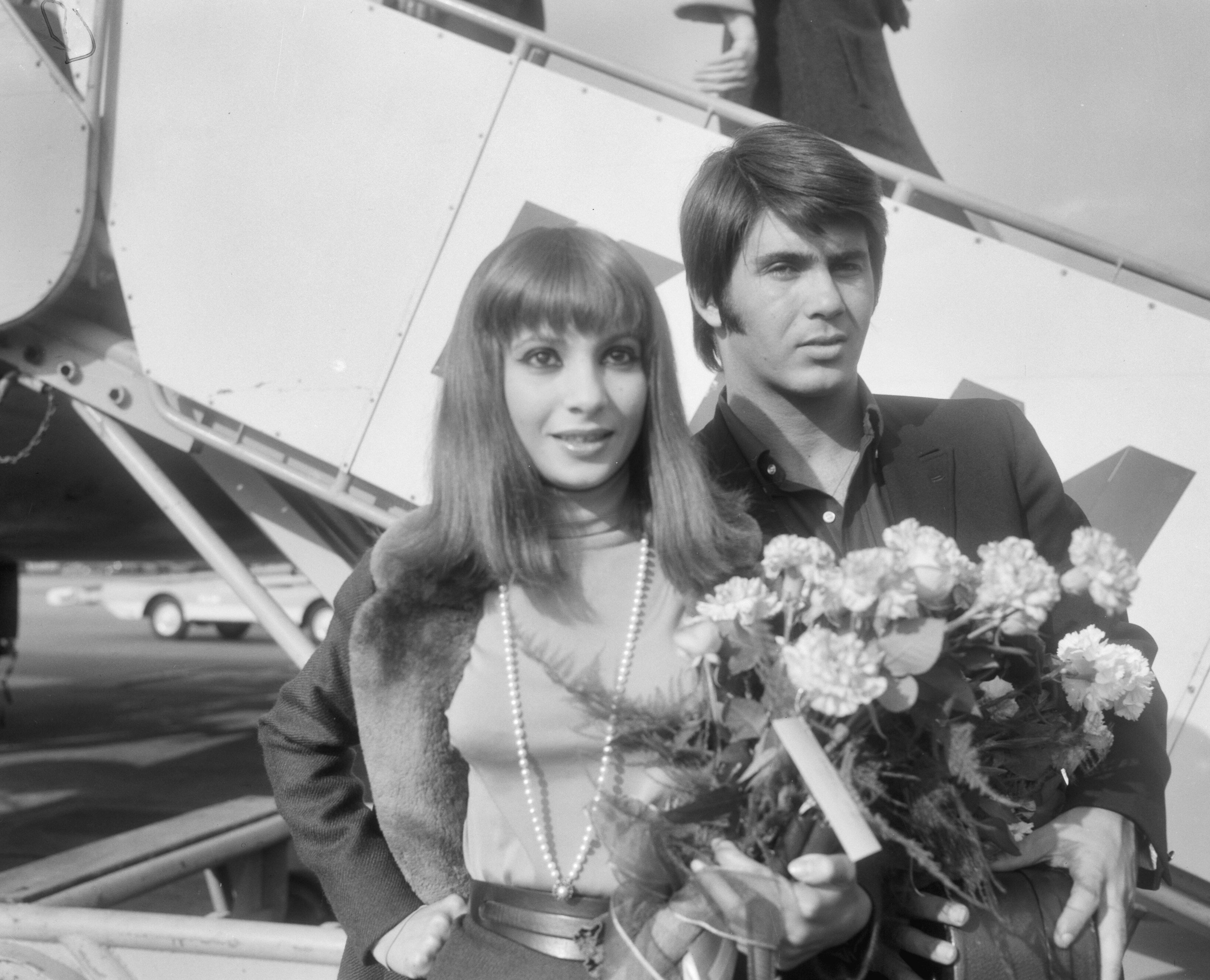
Esther & Abi Ofarim arriving at Schiphol in Amsterdam on September 9 (1966)

In 1963 and 1964, Esther and Abi had success on the charts in Europe. In the fall of 1964, Esther embarked on a tour of the United States with the Smothers Brothers. Speaking about a performance at Oregon State University in Corvallis, Oregon, Jim Albright, campus correspondent, stated: "Everyone expected the Smother Brothers to be great, but Ester [sic] turned out to be fabulous ... people were amazed with her singing and her looks."

By 1965, Esther was well known throughout Europe. She headlined in the major concert halls and theaters. She starred in German films and had her own television specials on BBC and Eurovision.

In 1966, Abi and Ofarim had their first hit with "Noch einen Tanz", an English version of which, "One More Dance", was a hit in the UK two years later, peaking at No. 13. Their greatest success in Germany was in 1967 with "Morning of My Life", which was written by the Bee Gees. In 1968 "Cinderella Rockefella" hit the top of the charts in a number of countries including the UK. They performed live concerts in New York City and London, and they toured Europe before separating in 1969.

=== Solo career ===
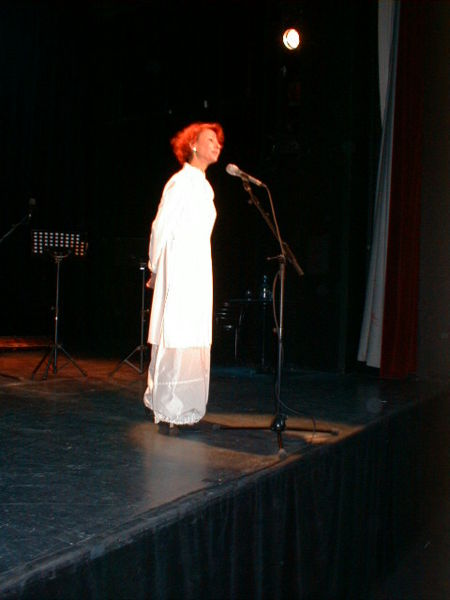
Esther Ofarim, Hamburg concert (2001)

Esther began recording as a solo artist in the early 1960s. She often sang in different languages. In 1967, she recorded Esther im Kinderland, in which she sang 20 children's songs from eight countries in six different languages. After her divorce from Abi, she continued performing and released several albums.

On 25 February 1970, she co-starred in her own BBC television special The Young Generation Meet Esther Ofarim broadcast on BBC1. Later that year, she sang "Long About Now" on Scott Walker's album 'Til the Band Comes In.

In 1982, she released the album Complicated Ladies on Mercury Records with Eberhard Schoener, Wolf Wondratschek, and Ulf Miehe.

In 1984, she played in Joshua Sobol's play Ghetto, produced by Peter Zadek in Berlin. There she sang songs including "Frühling" and "Unter deinen weissen Sternen". Her songs were featured in the 2004 Israeli film, Walk on Water.

== Personal life ==
At the age of 17, Esther married Abi Ofarim on December 11, 1958. They separated in 1969, and their divorce was finalized in Germany in November 1970.

Esther later married assistant television director Philipp von Sell, who is 18 years her junior. They had a son, David von Sell, born in New York in 1983. Esther and Philipp divorced when David was nine. David is a musician, he attended Berklee College of Music in Boston.

== Accolades ==
In 1965, Esther won an Edison Award at the Grand Gala du Disque in Holland. One year later, she was voted Germany's best female singer.

== Discography ==
=== Duo albums with Abi ===
- 1961 : Ha Ofarim (The Does) (Israphon AP 201)
- 1962 : Mousar Adin (Foibles and Fables) (Israphon AP 210)
- 1963 : Esther Ofarim and Abraham (Songs der Welt) (Philips B48051L-840458BY-840438PY-PHM200102-PHS600102)
- 1964 : Melodie einer Nacht (Philips P48104L)
- 1965 : That’s Our Song (Neue Songs der Welt) (Philips BL7698-652204BL-843750PY, Litratone 12135MS)
- 1966 : Noch einen Tanz (Philips 843775PY)
- 1966 : Sing Hallelujah (Das Neue Ofarim Album) (Philips BL7757-P48141L-843920PY, Litratone 12134 MS)
- 1967 : 2 in 3 (GER-UK-ESP-ISR) (Philips 838807JY-620209JL-620210JL, Phonodor 13004)
- 1967 : Cinderella-Rockefella (FR) (Philips 844301BY)
- 1967 : Cinderella-Rockefella (USA) (Philips PHS600269)
- 1968 : Up To Date (GER-UK-ISR) (Philips 838808JY, Phonodor 12196)
- 1969 : Ofarim Konzert-Live 1969 (GER) (Philips H72AM201)
- 1969 : Ofarim Concert-Live 1969 (UK) (Philips 88422DY)
- 1969 : Ofarim Concert-Live (USA) (Philips PHS600330)
- 1972 : Rak Ivrit (Hebrew Only) (Phonodor 13034)

=== Solo albums ===
- 1962 : Bechireï Moshe Wilensky (4 Wilensky Songs, as Esther Reichstat) (Israphon EP 109)
- 1962 : Bechireï Yeladim (Children Songs, as Esther Reichstat) (Israphon AP 211)
- 1962 : Hayu Leylot (Those Were The Nights, as Esther Reichstat) (Israphon AP 303)
- 1963 : Esther In Geneva (published on CD in 2012, Bear Family Records BCD 17307 AH)
- 1965 : Esther Ofarim : American Folk Songs in French (Philips P 48.131 L)
- 1965 : Is It Really Me! (Philips PHS 600–185)
- 1967 : Esther Im Kinderland (Philips 843 995 PY)
- 1969 : Esther Ofarim : The Pink Album, Folk Songs (Philips PHS 600–343)
- 1972 : Un Prince en Avignon (Philips ST 6-303-063, compilation of songs in french)
- 1972 : Esther : The Green Album, Ladino and French Ancient Songs (CBS-EMI-HÖRZU SHZE 367)
- 1972 : Esther Ofarim : American Folk Songs (EMI-Columbia-BASF C062-05-178)
- 1973 : Esther Ofarim : Songs in French (EMI-Pathé C064-05287)
- 1973 : Live in Tel-Aviv (Hed Arzi BAN 14317)
- 1977 : In Concert in Tel-Aviv (Hed Arzi 64001, published in 1999, Emergo in 2001)
- 1981 : Time Square : guest of Eberhard Schoener
- 1982 : Esther Ofarim : The White Album, Poems and Cantics (Hed Arzi BAN 14983)
- 1982 : Complicated Ladies (Mercury)
- 1988 : Hayu Lailot (revival on CD of 1962's Hayu Leylot)
- 1988 : In Concert in Tel-Aviv (Hed Arzi 64001, published in 1999)
- 2005 : Back On Stage : Live in Hannover 2003 (Tropical Music)
- 2006 : In New York, with Bobby Scott orchestra (Bureau B, revival of Philips-1965's Is It Really Me)
- 2009 : In London, prod Bob Johnston (Bureau B, revival of EMI-1972's Folk Songs)
- 2009 : I'll See You In My Dreams: Live in Hamburg 2009 (Tropical Music)
- 2011 : Le Chant des Chants (Bear Family BCD 17210 AH, revival of EMI-Pathé 1973's Songs in French)
- 2012 : Esther In Geneva (see in 1963)

=== Charted singles ===
Year	Single	GER
1963	"T'en vas pas"	39
1963	"Melodie einer Nacht"	39
1964	"Morgen ist alles vorüber"	23

== See also ==
- Music of Israel
- Culture of Israel

Awards and achievements
Preceded by Jean Philippe with "Le Retour"	Switzerland in the Eurovision Song Contest; 1963	Succeeded by Anita Traversi with "I miei pensieri"
