= Abi Ofarim =

Israeli musician and dancer (1937–2018)

Abi Ofarim אבי עופרים
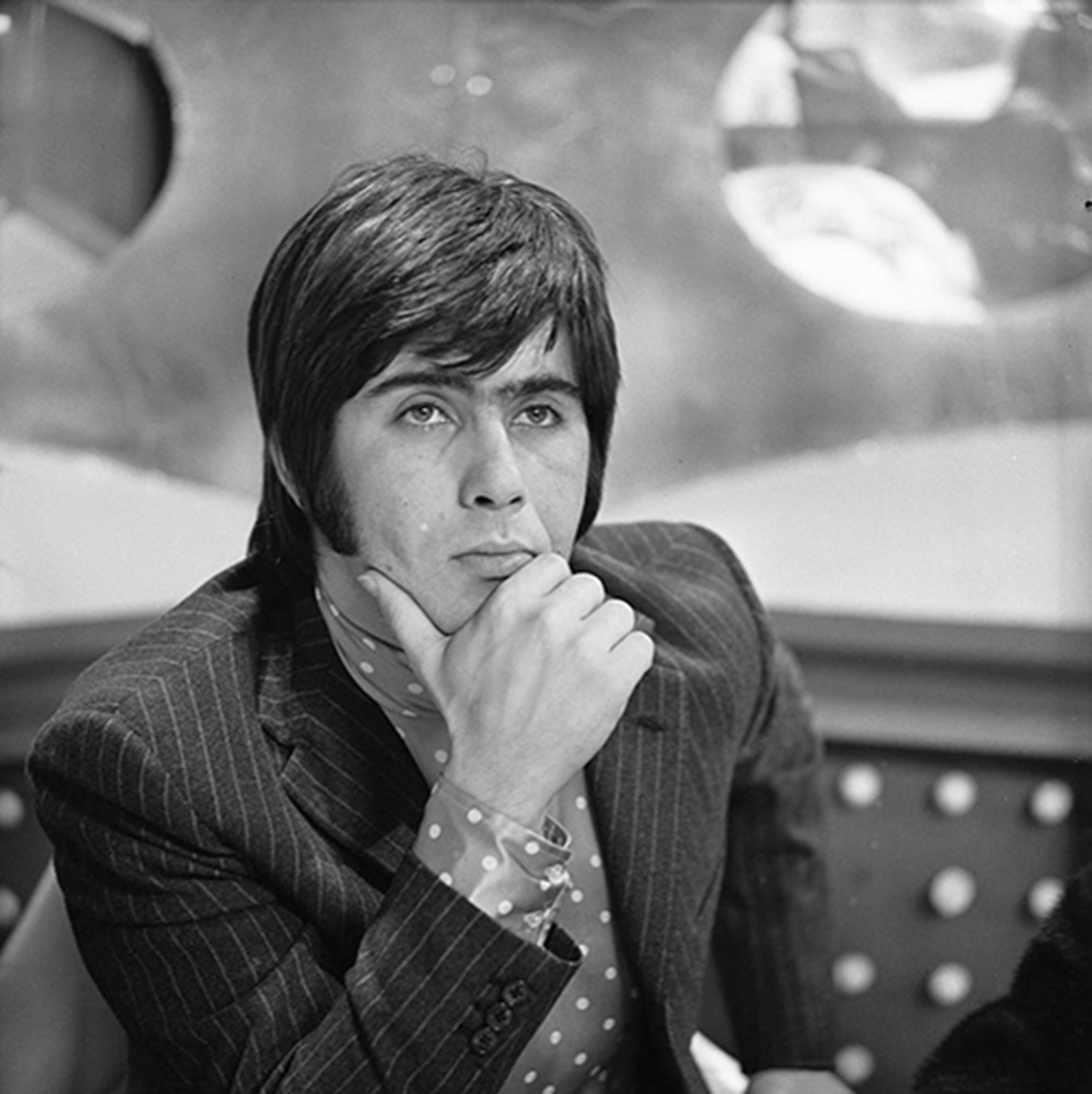
- Ofarim in March 1968

Background information
- Also known as: Abraham
- Born: Avraham Reichstadt; October 5, 1937; Safed, Mandatory Palestine
- Died: May 4, 2018 (aged 80) Munich, Germany
- Occupations: Musician, singer, songwriter, producer
- Instrument: Guitar
- Labels: Philips, CBS, Warner Bros., RCA, Polydor, Sony Music

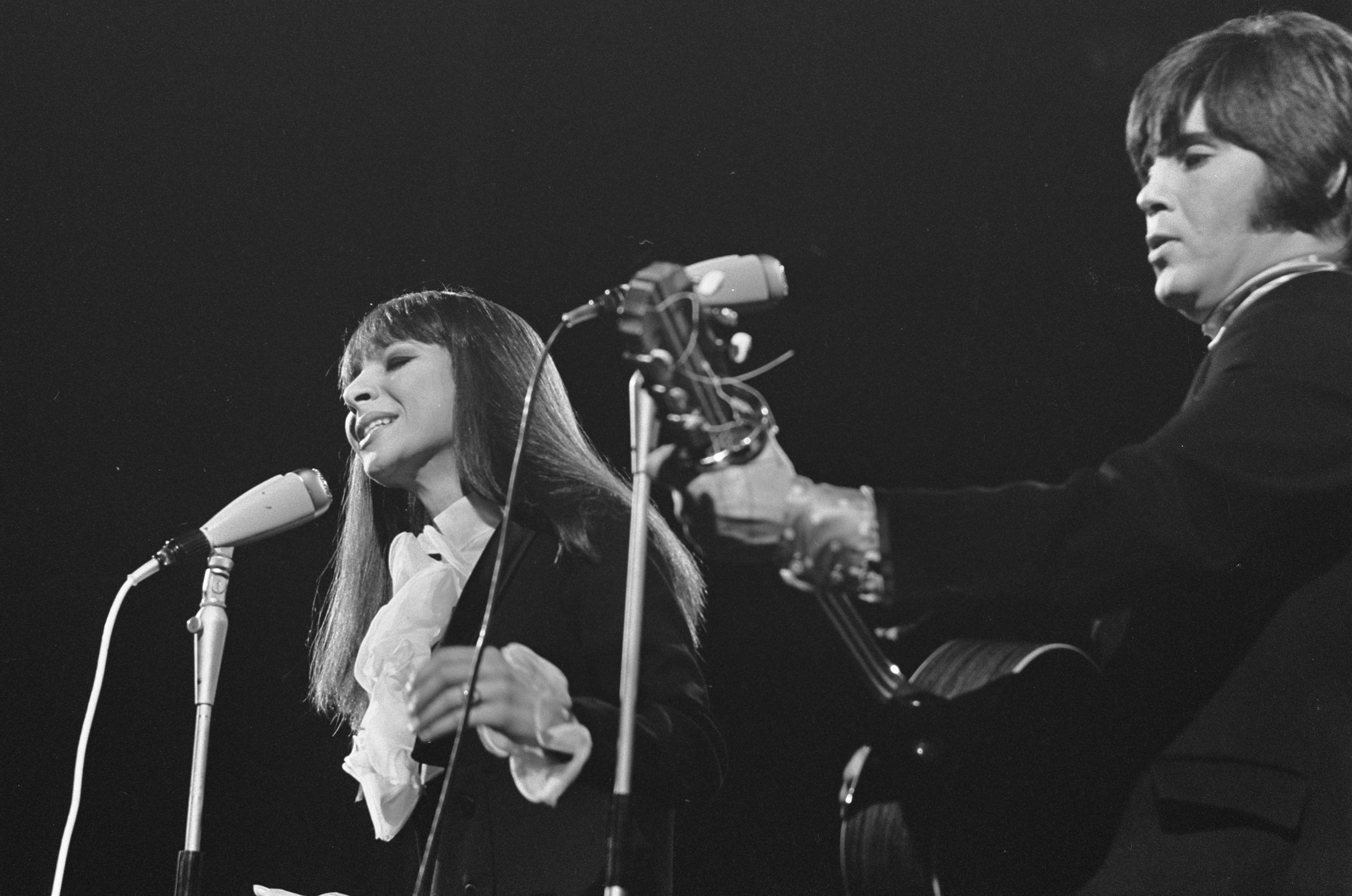
Abi & Esther Ofarim performing at the Grand Gala du Disque on March 8, 1968.

Abi Ofarim (born Avraham Reichstadt; Hebrew: אבי עופרים; October 5, 1937 – May 4, 2018) was an Israeli musician and dancer. He is better known for his work in the 1960s as half of the duo Esther & Abi Ofarim with his then-wife Esther Ofarim.

== Life and career ==
Avraham Reichstadt (later Abi Ofarim) was born in Safed, Galilee, then Mandatory Palestine, on October 5, 1937. Upon Israel's independence in 1948, he attended ballet school and made his stage debut in Haifa in 1952. By the age of 17, he was arranging his own choreography, and by 18 had his own dance studio. He was then recruited to serve in the Israeli army during the Suez crisis and the Sinai war.

=== Esther & Abi Ofarim ===
In December 1958, Reichstadt married Esther Zaied. He achieved international fame performing with her as a musical duo Esther & Abi Ofarim in the 1960s, playing the guitar and singing backing vocals. The couple relocated to Geneva, then eventually to Germany. In 1966, they had their first hit in Germany with "Noch einen Tanz". Their greatest success in Germany came the next year with "Morning of my Life", written by the Bee Gees. In 1968, "Cinderella Rockefella" hit the top of the charts in a number of countries including the UK. The duo played live concerts in New York City and London, and they toured Europe before separating in 1969.

=== Solo career ===
Abi Ofarim continued performing and recording in Europe. He also worked as a manager, composer, and arranger. In 1970, Ofarim launched his own record production and music publishing company Prom Music. He also worked with Liberty/United Artists Records in Munich. In 1972, he released an album with British singer Tom Winter. In 1975, Ofarim left Prom, selling his interest to ex-partner Yehuda Zwick.

His book, Der Preis der wilden Jahre ("The Price of the Wild Years") was first published in 1982. That year, Ofarim released the album Much Too Much on RCA Records in Germany. He released an album, Too Much Of Something, in 2009.

Beginning in April 2014, Ofarim ran a "Jugendzentrum für Senioren" ("Youth Center for Elderly People") in Munich, a social project against poverty and solitude of the elderly, together with his organization "Kinder von Gestern e. V." ("Children of Yesterday").

== Personal life ==
Ofarim married Esther Ofarim (née Zaied) on December 11, 1958. After their divorce in 1970, he accused her of "egotism and snobbery." He dated German singer Susan Avilés and actress Iris Berben, before remarrying twice. His third marriage was to Sandra (Sandy) Reichstadt, who he divorced in 2004. Their sons, Gil Ofarim and Tal Ofarim, are also musicians. Gil Ofarim is the front man of the band Zoo Army.

After his divorce from Esther, Ofarim developed a cocaine and alcohol addiction. In 1979, he was arrested for possession of narcotics and tax evasion. He spent a month in prison and a year on probation.

In 2017, Abi Ofarim developed pneumonia. He made a recovery and was able to return to his home in Munich to celebrate his 80th birthday in October 2017.

Ofarim died aged 80 in Munich after a long illness on May 4, 2018.

== Discography ==
=== Albums ===
- 1972: Ofarim & Winter – Ofarim & Winter (CBS)
- 1982: Much Too Much (RCA)
- 2009: Too Much Of Something (Sony Music Entertainment Germany)

=== Singles ===
- 1964: "Shake, Shake (Wenn Ich Dich Nicht Hätte)" (Philips)
- 1971: "Zeit Ist Geld" (Warner Bros. Records)
- 1973: Ofarim & Winter – "Slow Motion Man" (CBS)
- 1973: Ofarim And Winter – "Take Me Up To Heaven" (CBS)
- 1973: Ofarim & Winter – "Speak To Me" (CBS)
- 1973: Ofarim & Winter – "Why Red" (CBS)
- 1982: "Mama, O Mama" (RCA)
- 1982: "Heartaches" (RCA)
- 1989: Abi Ofarim & Sima – "In The Morning Of My Life" (Polydor)
- 2007: "Mama, Oh Mama" (White Records)
