= Mordechai Zeira =

Israeli composer

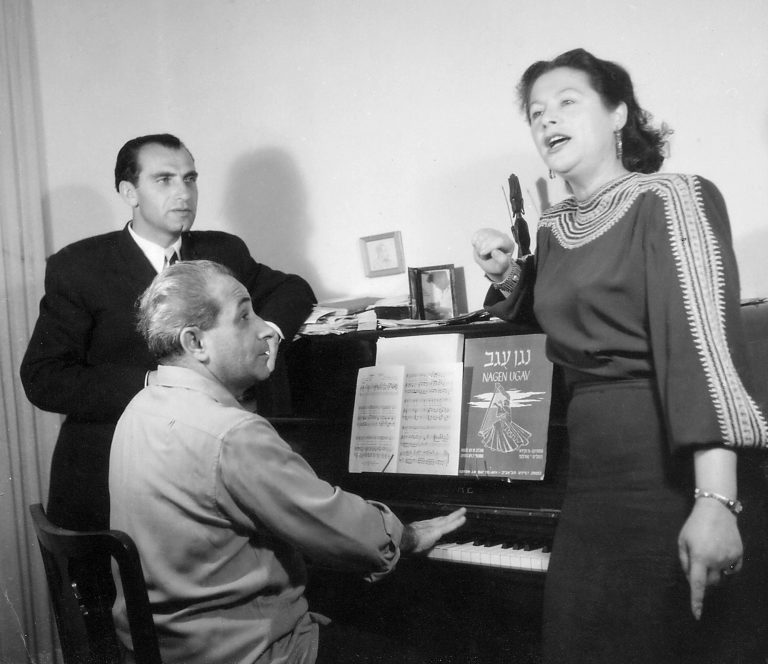
- Born: מרדכי זעירא; July 6 1905; Kiev, Russian Empire
- Died: August 1 1968 (age 63); Israel
- Spouse: Sarah Zeira

Mordechai Zeira (Hebrew: מרדכי זעירא; July 6, 1905 – August 1, 1968), born in Kiev as Dmitry Greben, was an Israeli composer.

Mordechai Zaira (Greben) was one of the most important Israeli composers and songwriters. He wrote melodies for the best poets and songwriters, including Jacob Orland, Nathan Alterman, Aharon Ashman and Alexander Penn. His works are still played today, some in modern versions by young artists. At the time he was called "the troubadour of the Hebrew singer".

== Biography ==
Mordechai Zaira was born Dmitry Mark (Mitya) Greben in the city of Kiev in the Russian Empire (now the capital of Ukraine). He studied mechanics at the Polytechnic of Kyiv, but due to the difficulties of earning a living, he stopped his studies after two semesters and moved to sewing shoes. In 1924 he was arrested for being in the Zionist youth movement Hashomer Hatzair, but received a permit to leave the Soviet Union and immigrated to Israel at the age of 19.

In Israel, he joined Kibbutz Afikim (then called "Kibbutz Hashomer Hatzair S.S.S.R."), which was then located near Yavne'el. The members of the kibbutz staged a performance of a Hebrew opera called "Carmela". The orchestra, which included a concertina and comb players, was conducted by Zeira, who was talented in playing combs. According to his friends, he was then called "Masreki" (translated as Comb-i, referencing also to his surname Greben - Гребень which means in Russian comb).

After a few months, the group moved to Afula and staged a new show, "Blue Shirt", in which Zeira's first song (lyrics and lyrics) also called "Blue Shirt", which gained great popularity among the socialist youth movements in the Land of Israel. Moshe Halevy, the founder of Ohel Theater, convinced Zeira to move to Tel Aviv and study acting. In 1927 Zeira decided to stop his acting studies and study composition, mainly with the musicologists Shlomo Rozovsky and David Shor. His decision to switch from acting studies to music studies was made following his meeting with the composer Yoel Engel at the Ohel Theater.

After Engel's death in 1927, Zeira kept being in touch with the composer Shlomo Rosovsky, who also wrote music for the same theater (for 'Yaakov and Rachel'). Zeira then worked in the Dead Sea factories and for about a year went to Jerusalem on weekends to Rozovsky's house, to study with him. In exchange, Zeira copied notes for him, for the purpose of researching Biblical cantillation notes that the composer wrote at the time.

With Rozovsky's encouragement, Zeira became familiar with the music of the various Jewish denominations in Jerusalem, in order to get to know the "sources" of Jewish music from which he would draw in the future. In addition, he also studied with Prof. David Shor - in public lectures and private lessons, which the professor, who noticed his talents, and was aware of his financial situation, taught him for free, in his home.

In 1927 he met Sarah Gutman, a student of the Lewinsky College of Education, who studied when they both sang in Menashe Rabina's "Beit HaLevi'im" choir in Tel Aviv. The two were partners, a few years later, in January 1933, they got married in Kfar Vitkin, and in 1935 their only son, Yuval, was born.

In 1928, together with Yitzchak Shanhar, he published a collection of songs for Aliyah to Jerusalem, in which Shanhar wrote the words and Zeira the melodies. Zeira saw this as the beginning of his work as a composer. In this year he changed his last name to "Zeira", due to his short stature, on the advice of the writer Aharon Ashman.

Since end of 1933, he earned his living by working at Israel Electric Corporation, initially as a meter reader and then, following a heart attack, he switched to bookkeeping. In this context, he wrote and composed the song "The Network Song" ("Hazaken Me-Naharayim") about Pinchas Rotenberg. In 1966 he retired.

In World War II, Zeira enlisted in the British Army, was one of the founders of the band "Me'ein Zeh" of the Jewish Brigade and composed some of its songs, among them "Shalechet" ("Deep sadness in the eyes"). He also wrote the words of the "Shir Ha-Hodaya" on his way by train to Egypt, and then also the melody.

Zeira was attentive to what was happening in Israel, and some of his songs are real-time responses to the events that happened. For example, his poem "Five left a to build a homeland" is a response to the murder of the five Jews by Arab rioters, after whom the Kibbutz Ma'ale HaHamisha was named. His famous song "Layla Layla" was composed during one of the curfew days of the British rule. Zeira composed two of Alexander Penn's songs in memory of Alexander Zaid.

Upon completing a year to Zaid's death, he composed the song "Zaid's song" ("Once and more"), and two years later he composed "Adama Admati" (it is mistakenly believed that this song was composed upon completing a first year since the death).

Another famous song written by him and his friend Orland was "Shir Same'ah" written after the Ma'ale Akrabim massacre in 1954 by infiltrators from Jordan. The two met in a club in Tel Aviv with Prime Minister Moshe Sharett, who urged them to write a song that would dispel the oppressed atmosphere that prevailed In Israel following the murder, the song was written immediately and became a big hit in those years.

In Zeira's songs there is a fusion of East and West, but the tone of the Hasidic singer that he picked up as a child from home as well as the influence of Russian music stands out in his songs. The success of his songs is explained by the fact that they are catchy but at the same time have an interesting poetic development and a melodic grace. His work was greatly appreciated and earned him the title "The Troubadour of the Hebrew Singer".

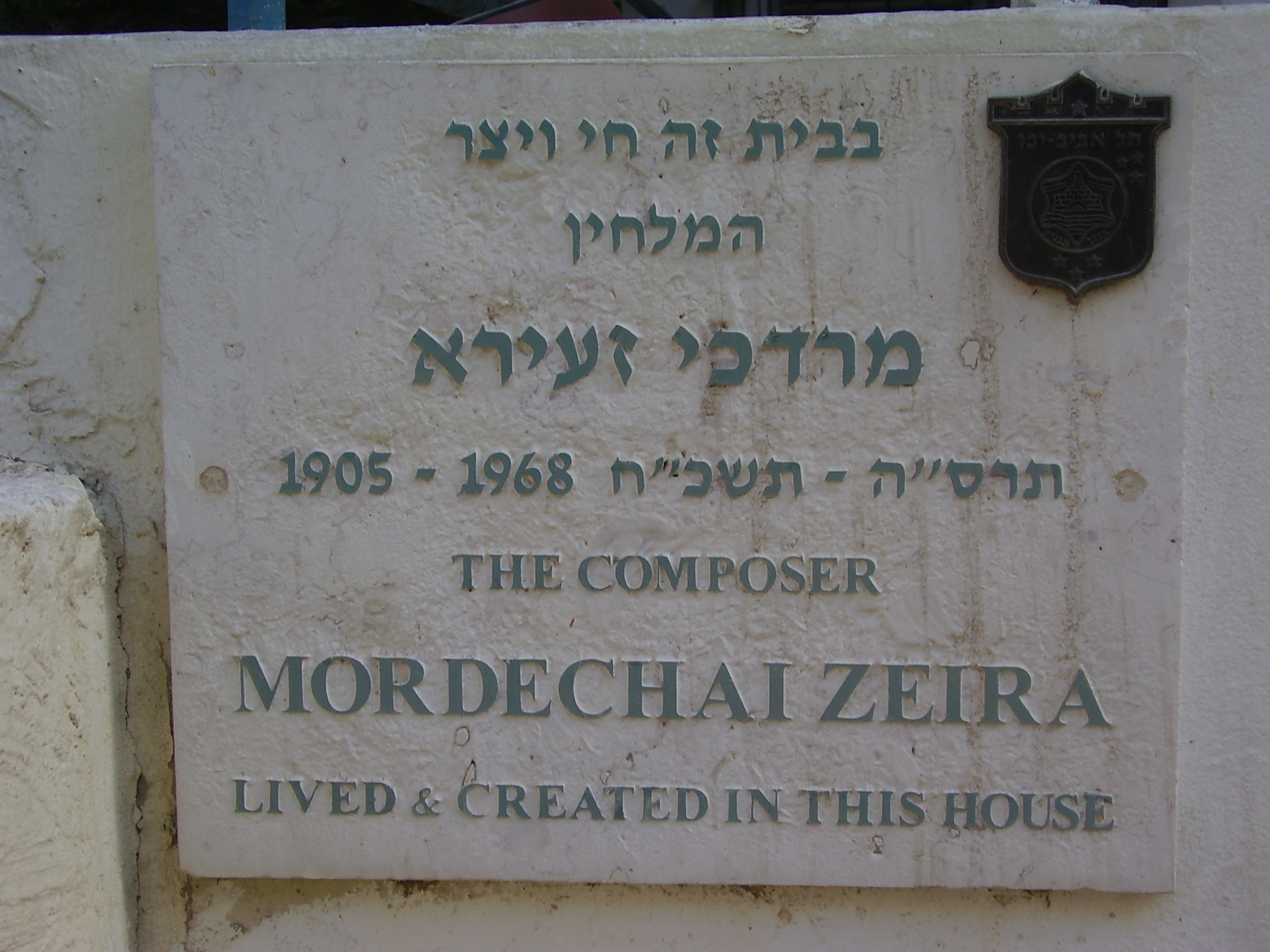
Memorial plaque on the composer Mordechai Zeira house in Tel Aviv

When he was later asked how he composed his poems, he replied: "I love poetry and read many poems and repeat and read them. And there are times when, upon reading a particular poem, something vibrates in my heart suddenly. So it's as if the melody is sown and its 'germination' begins, which can take hours, days, months and even years - until the song appears and goes out into the world".

Zaira died of a heart attack in 1968 and was buried in the Kiryat Shaul cemetery in Tel Aviv. He left after him his wife, Sarah, and their only son, Yuval. Sarah was involved in the distribution of his songs after his death. She initiated the publication of two books of his poems - "One more song" and "Layla Layla". In addition, the song album "Layla Layla" was also produced, which includes 43 songs on 2 CDs.

His archive is deposited in the music department of the National Library of Israel in Jerusalem.

== Songs ==
External audio
- Your may hear Morechai Zeira's "Shir Hashamisha" as sung by Sidor Belarsky in 1939; Here on ucsb.edu

- Layla, Layla
- Shnei Shoshanim ('Two Roses')
- What Say Your Eyes?
- Shir Hashamisha
