= Cinderella Rockefella =

- German picture sleeve

Single by Esther & Abi Ofarim

from the album 2 in 3
- B-side: "Lonesome Road"
- Released: 9 February 1968
- Recorded: 1967
- Genre: Novelty
- Length: 2:29
- Label: Philips BF 1640 (UK)
- Songwriters: Mason Williams, Nancy Ames
- Producers: Abi Ofarim, Chaim Semel

Esther & Abi Ofarim singles chronology
| "Morning of My Life" (1967) | "Cinderella Rockefella" (1968) | "One More Dance" (1968) |

Official audio
- "Cinderella Rockefella" on YouTube

"Cinderella Rockefella" is a novelty song written by Mason Williams and Nancy Ames. It was originally recorded and released by Israeli folk duo Esther & Abi Ofarim on their 1967 album 2 in 3. It became an international hit single in 1968.

== Original version ==
Esther Ofarim and the Smothers Brothers first performed "Cinderella Rockefella" on the CBS variety program The Smothers Brothers Comedy Hour in April 1967. Mason Williams, who co-wrote the song, was a writer for the series. Ofarim recorded the song with her husband Abi Ofarim that year. The words of the song imitate yodelling, with a somewhat 1920s-style arrangement structured like a twelve-bar blues.

The single was released on Philips Records in February 1968 in the UK. Esther & Abi Ofarim made an appearance on The Eamonn Andrews Show on ITV to promote it in the UK. The single peaked at No. 1 in the British singles chart on 5 March 1968, where it remained for three weeks. It was also No. 1 on the NME chart for four weeks. As of 2020, Esther & Abi Ofarim remain the only act from Israel to achieve a UK No. 1 single. The record was an international hit, reaching the top 10 in various countries. It was less successful in the U.S., peaking at No. 68 on the Billboard Hot 100 chart in May 1968.

The song appeared on the albums 2 in 3 (1967) in Europe and Cinderella Rockefella (1968) in the US.

According to Radio Caroline DJ Andy Archer, the song was the last to be played on Radio Caroline South on the night of 2–3 March 1968, before its radio ship (like that of its sister station Radio Caroline North) was towed into harbour over unpaid debts on the morning of 3 March.

Williams recorded his own version of the song for his 1968 album The Mason Williams Ear Show on Warner Bros.-Seven Arts. For his rendition the duet vocal was performed by one of his Smothers Brothers collaborators, Jennifer Warnes.

== Critical reception ==
Professional ratings
Review scores
| Source | Rating |
|---|---|
| Record World | 4/4 stars |

Cash Box (9 March 1968): "Out of the left field arena of novelty songs comes this wierd [sic] rollick complete with mock yodel and tuba-banjo backdrop. Crazy romp that shows the duo in rare form, very rare for these 'straight' talents. Could very easily repeat the track’s monster Enlish [sic] breakout on this side of the Atlantic. Exceptional long shot."

Record World (9 March 1968): "Hilarious parody duet that is camp enough to connect with the populace. Pair are terrific."

== Chart performance ==
Esther & Abi Ofarim
| Chart (1968) | Peak position |
|---|---|
| Australia (Go-Set National Top 40) | 14 |
| Austria (Ö3 Austria Top 40) | 3 |
| Belgium (Ultratop) | 2 |
| Canada (RPM 100) | 6 |
| Germany (GfK Entertainment) | 5 |
| Ireland (IRMA) | 5 |
| Netherlands (Dutch Top 40) | 1 |
| New Zealand (Listener) | 12 |
| Norway (VG-lista) | 8 |
| Spain (El Gran Musical) | 8 |
| Switzerland (Swiss Hitparade) | 10 |
| UK (NME Top 30) | 1 |
| UK Singles (Official Charts Company) | 1 |
| US (Billboard Hot 100) | 68 |
| US (Cash Box Top 100) | 67 |
| US (Record World 100 Top Pops) | 92 |
| Venezuela | 7 |

== Cover versions ==
- In 1968, Australian husband-and-wife duo Anne & Johnny Hawker reached No. 12 with their rendition on Australia's Go-Set National Top 40 chart.
- In 1968, Italian band Quartetto Cetra created an Italian cover for a 45 rpm.
- During the early 1970s, The Carpenters performed the song as part of their live shows, including a 1972 show in Australia.
- In the 2004 Israeli film Walk on Water, Knut Berger and Caroline Peters perform a karaoke version of the song, sung by Rita and Ivri Lider.
