= Grand Gala du Disque =

1960–1974 Dutch musical gala

The Grand Gala du Disque (lit. 'Great Record Gala') was an annual Dutch gala sponsored by local record companies. There were two separate events, the Grand Gala du Disque Classique for classical music and the Grand Gala du Disque Populaire for popular music. The gala was created in 1960, as an evening where Edison Awards would be presented, and a variety of national and international artists would perform. For many years it was the most popular radio and TV show of the year in Holland.

== History ==
The Grand Gala du Disque was organized by the Committee for Collective Gramophone Campaigns (CCGC) as a gala where the Edisons would be presented and an event where a variety of national and international artists would perform. The CCGC was formed in 1960 by the national union of record deals (NVGD) and the national union of record manufacturers and importers (NVGI).

The first ceremony took place on October 22, 1960, at the Concertgebouw in Amsterdam. The first gala lasted a total of 7 hours and featured about 50 acts. The broadcast was a joint venture of TV broadcaster AVRO and the Netherlands' major record companies. The event became the most popular radio and TV show of the year in Holland. The Grand Gala was instrumental in introducing the European market to foreign artist.

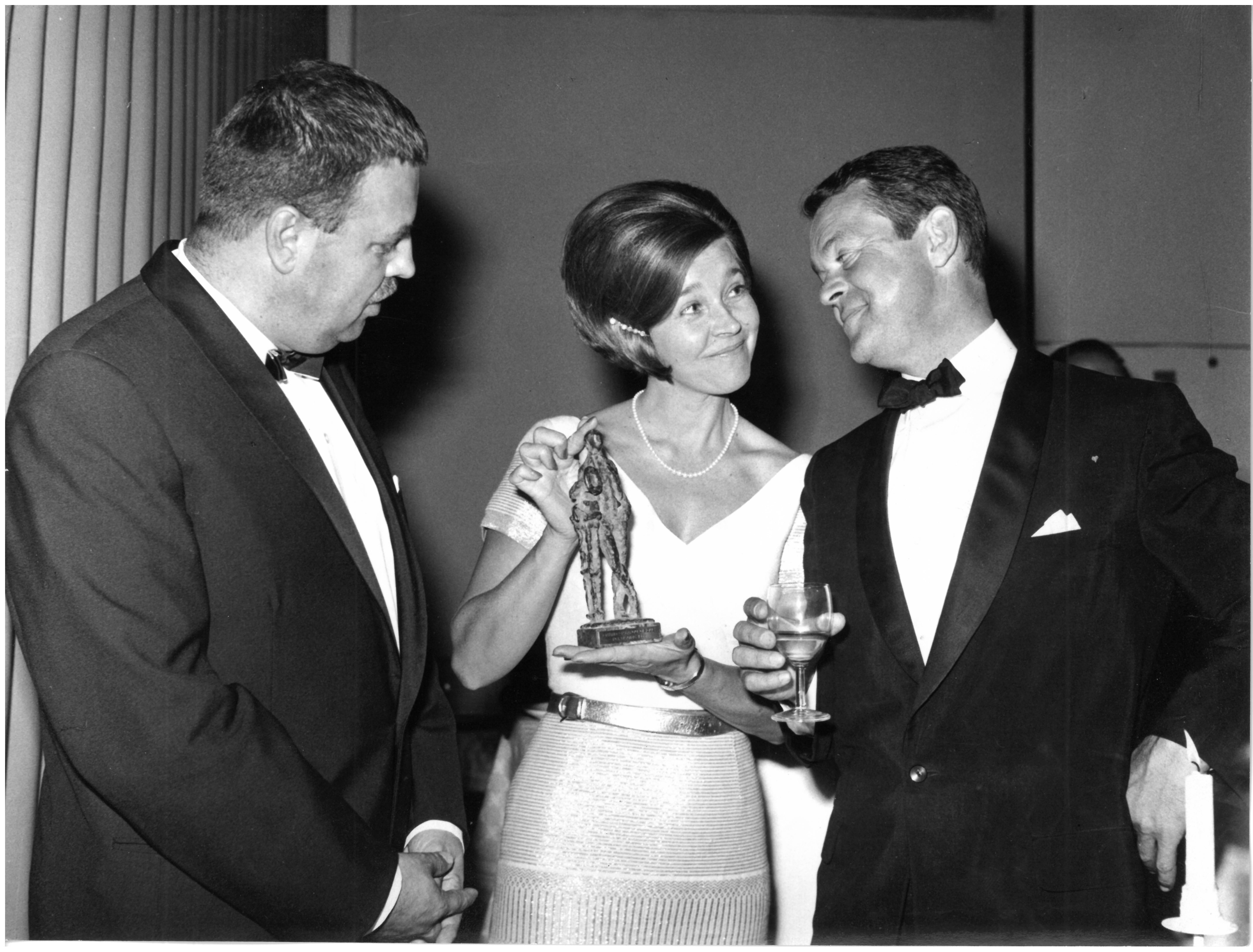
Sture Wahlberg (producer) with Alice Babs and Svend Asmussen at the Grand Gala du Disque in 1965.

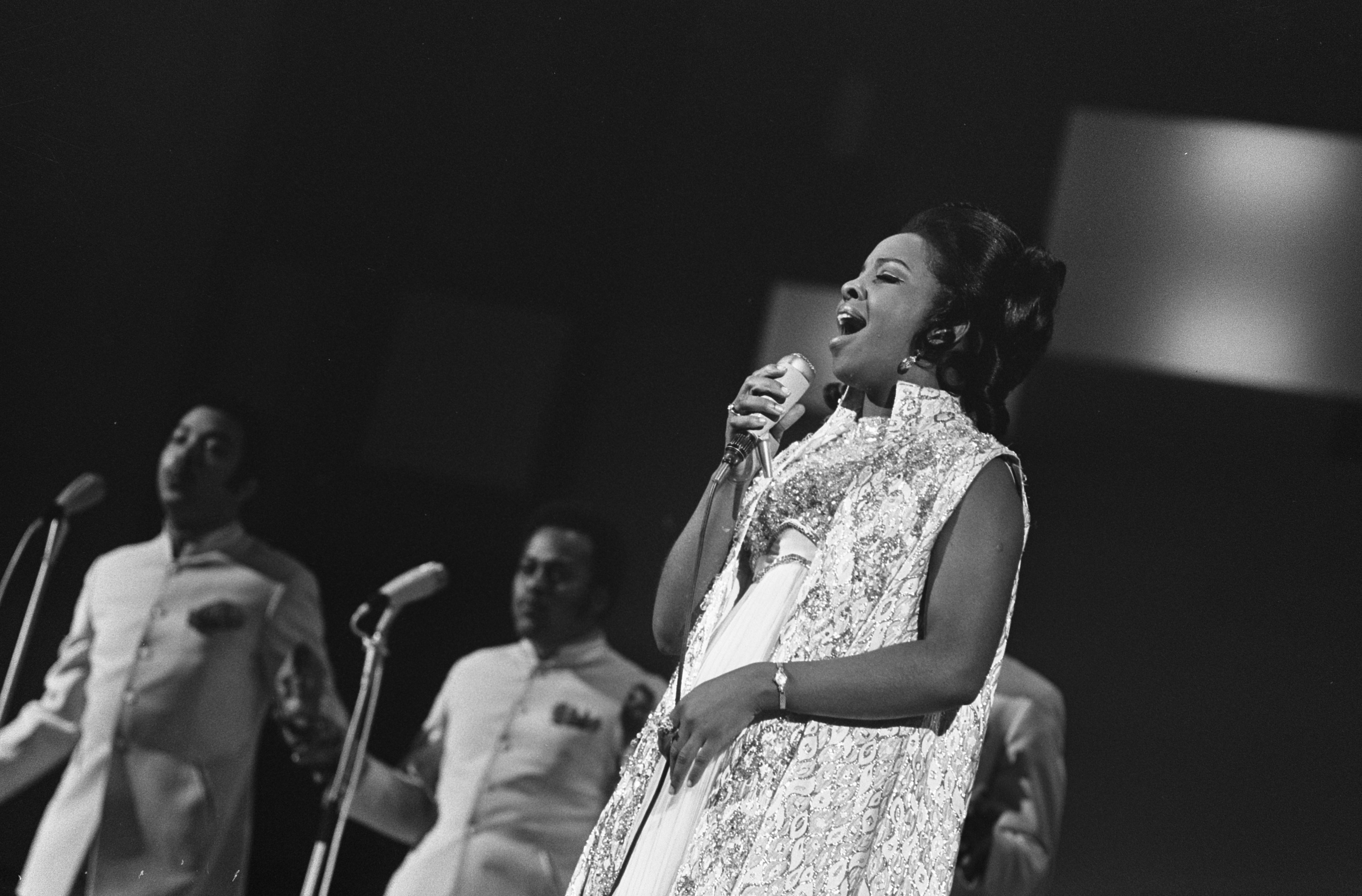
Gladys Knight & the Pips at Grand Gala du Disque Populaire on March 7, 1969.

In the years that followed, the Grand Gala du Disque became a prestigious annual event, booking top performers and presenters. In 1963, Princess Irene attended the Grand Gala du Disque Classique in the Amsterdam Concertgebouw and presented the Edisons to the winners on October 4. That year, Princess Margreit visited the Grand Gala du Disque Populaire at the Kurzall, Scheveningen on October 12. Artists included Wim Kan, Wim Sonneveld, Marlene Dietrich, Francoise Hardy, Petula Clark, Freddy Quinn, Corry Brokken, and Anneke Gronloh.

The 6th annual gala took place on October 2, 1965. Among artists who attended were the Supremes, the Everly Brothers, Cilla Black, Wanda Jackson, Willeke Alberti, Lucille Starr, and Frans Kok orchestra.

The grand old style of the Grand Gala du Disque was deemed old fashioned by the end of the 1960s, as the emphasis in the music business shifted from classical/vocal music to pop and soul. However, the promotional power of the Grand Gala du Disque was evident after the Four Tops appeared in 1968, they subsequently sold 45,000 in album sales. Nancy Wilson, Jimmy Smith, Eugene Cicero, Vikki Carr, Wilson Pickett, Dusty Springfield, Esther & Abi Ofarim, Joan Baez, and Nancy Sinatra were among the performers at the 1968 Grand Gala du Disque Populaire, which was held separately as a TV special before the live event.

The 10th annual Grand Gala du Disque Populaire took place at the RAI Congress Center in Amsterdam on March 7, 1969. The lineup of performers were: Nini Rosso, Peggy March, Chet Atkins, Buck Owens, the Sandpipers, Gladys Knight & the Pips, Ike & Tina Turner, Miriam Makeba, the Pentangle, the Moody Blues, Harry Secombe, Rika Zarai, Mireille Mathieu, James Last, Amalia Rodrigues, Martine Bijl, and Ann Burton.

At the Grand Gala du Disque Classique on October 16, 1970, the Amsterdam Concertgebouw Orchestra, under Bernard Haitink, performed works by Berlioz, Bartok, Mahler, and Richard Strauss. Soloist included Stephen Bishop and Dietrich Fischer-Dieskau.

The Grand Gala 1972, broadcast started on 25 February and was presented by Willem Duys and Mies Bouwman. The orchestra conductor was Rogier van Otterloo who accompanied artists such as Gene Pitney, Gilbert O'Sullivan, Peret, Lenny Kuhr, Roy Black, Middle Of The Road, Charles Aznavour, Hildegard Knef, Iwan Rebroff, Helen Reddy, The New Seekers, Rod McKuen, Labi Siffre, The Beach Boys, BeeGees and Johnny Cash who celebrated his 40th birthday live on stage, because the programme lasted much longer than expected.

The Grand Gala du Disque Populaire on February 15, 1974, was rebroadcast in other European countries. Performers included Thijs van Leer, Georges Moustaki, the Carpenters, Dobie Gray, a very, very short appearance by Jan Akkerman, Barry White, Love Unlimited, Don McLean, Bobby Vinton and Tom Jones.

After the organizers decided to quit sponsoring the galas in 1974, the ceremonies became a much more intimate affair. No Edisons were awarded from 1974 to 1976. In the late 1970s and early 1980s, the ceremonies were not televised. During the 1980s, several attempts were made to revive the old Grand Gala format (or a format similar to that of the Academy Awards and Grammy Award ceremonies), but due to lack of interest from record companies, artists, the media, and broadcasters, none of these initiatives proved successful and long-lasting. However, Edisons continue to be awarded annually.
