= Morning of My Life =

1965 song written by Barry Gibb

"In the Morning"

Song by Bee Gees

from the album Inception/Nostalgia
- Released: 1970
- Recorded: June – July 1966
- Genre: Folk
- Length: 2:52
- Label: Karussell (GER); Triumph (France)
- Songwriter: Barry Gibb
- Producer: Nat Kipner

"Morning of My Life"
- German picture sleeve

Single by Esther & Abi Ofarim

from the album 2 In 3
- Released: September 1967
- Genre: Folk
- Length: 2:57
- Label: Philips
- Songwriter: Barry Gibb
- Producer: Robert Stigwood

Esther & Abi Ofarim singles chronology
"Die Wahrheit (Die Fahrt ins Heu)" (1966)	"Morning of My Life" (1967)	"Cinderella Rockefella" (1968)

"Morning of My Life"

Song by Bee Gees

from the album Melody
- Released: 1971
- Recorded: 30 September 1970
- Genre: Baroque pop
- Length: 3:52
- Label: Polydor
- Songwriter: Barry Gibb
- Producers: Robert Stigwood, Bee Gees

"Morning of My Life" (originally known as "In the Morning") is a song written by Barry Gibb in 1965 whilst in the town of Wagga Wagga, Australia and later recorded by the Bee Gees and several other artists. It was recorded in 1966 during sessions for the album Spicks and Specks, and later was released as the opening track on the compilation Inception/Nostalgia in 1970. The first recording of the song to be released by any artist was by Ronnie Burns, first as a B-side to his Exit, Stage Right single in June 1967 and a month later on his Ronnie LP.

In 1969, Barry and Maurice Gibb performed an acoustic version with their sister Lesley, in a BBC Two special, made during the period when Robin Gibb had left the group to pursue a solo career.

They re-recorded the song on September 30, 1970 (by which time Robin had rejoined the group), during sessions for 2 Years On on the same day as "Every Second, Every Minute", "The First Mistake I Made", and the unreleased "Don't Forget Me Ida". This recording did not make the album but gave the song a whole new audience when used on the soundtrack of the 1971 film Melody along with other Bee Gees songs. Its first inclusion on a Bee Gees album was the compilation Best of Bee Gees Vol. 2 in 1973 and it subsequently appeared on the Tales from the Brothers Gibb box set. Throughout their career, the Bee Gees performed the song live on many occasions, most notably at the One Night Only concert in Las Vegas in 1997.

== Esther & Abi Ofarim version ==
Israeli duo Esther & Abi Ofarim recorded the song in 1967. Although they had been recording for many years, this song was their first UK release. It was released as a single on Philips Records in September 1967, and became a hit single in Germany, reaching No. 2, and it peaked at No. 9 in Austria. The B-side, "Garden of My Home", was written by all three Gibb brothers. Both tracks were produced by Robert Stigwood with orchestral arrangement by Phil Dennys (who also arranged some songs on Bee Gees' 1st). The single was released in mono and the song also appeared on the Ofarims' album 2 in 3.

== Other covers ==
- Nina Simone recorded a version of the song for her 1968 album 'Nuff Said! This version was recorded in the studio but applause was later added to give the effect of a live recording, following the theme of the rest of the album. The album also included a live cover version of the Bee Gees track "Please Read Me".
- Also in 1968, Mary Hopkin did a bilingual English/Welsh version of "Morning of my life".
- Andy Gibb recorded this song in 1980, while recording songs for his compilation Andy Gibb's Greatest Hits including "Time Is Time", "Me (Without You)", and a cover version of "Will You Love Me Tomorrow" with P.P. Arnold. His version of "Morning of my Life" was not released.
- Baptist Generals have included a version of this song on their 2013 album Jackleg Devotional to the Heart.
- Vera Lynn released a recording on her 1972 album Unforgettable Songs.
- Jennifer Warnes released a recording on her 1972 album Jennifer.
- John Holt covered the song on his 1973 reggae album 1000 Volts of Holt'.
- Emmy award-winning Faith Rivera released a ukulele version of the song on her 2005 album Suncatcher.
- David Gray, a British singer-songwriter, released the song on his 2007 live album A Thousand Miles Behind.
- Sabrina Starke, a Dutch singer, released a single version in 2014.
- Fleet Foxes covered this song for Record Store Day 2018, backing a choral version of their song "Crack-Up". They subsequently covered the song on their live albums A Very Lonely Solstice in 2020 and Live on Boston Harbor in 2024.
- The Bluegrass 45 released a bluegrass version as the title song of the 1973 LP In the Morning (Rebel SLP 1516).
