= Esther & Abi Ofarim =

1960s Israeli vocal duo

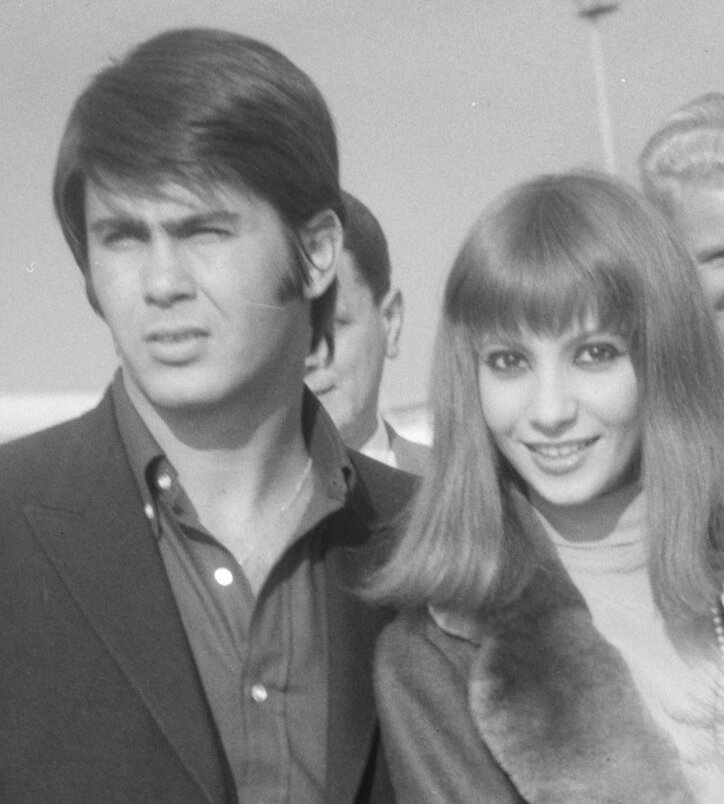
- Esther & Abi Ofarim, 1966

Background information
- Also known as: Esther Ofarim & Abraham
- Origin: Israel
- Genres: Folk; pop; world; schlager
- Years active: 1960–1969
- Labels: Israphone; Philips
- Past members: Esther Zaied; Abraham Reichstadt

Esther & Abi Ofarim were an Israeli musical duo active during the 1960s, consisting of husband and wife Abi Ofarim and Esther Ofarim. They enjoyed particular success in Germany. They had hits in Europe with their songs "One More Dance," "Morning of My Life," and "Cinderella Rockefella."

== Career ==
Esther Zaied (b. June 13, 1941) met guitarist and dancer Abraham "Abi" Reichstadt (October 5, 1937 – May 4, 2018) in Israel, in 1958. Esther, who had been singing since she was a child, was a student in Abi's dance studio in Haifa. They married on December 11, 1958. After Esther served four months in the Israeli Army, they began singing at home for fun before pursuing a professional music career together. Esther joined the group Ofarim, which was founded by Abi and Shmulik Kraus in 1958. The group changed its name to the Ofarim Trio and performed around Haifa, but Shmulik soon left the group.

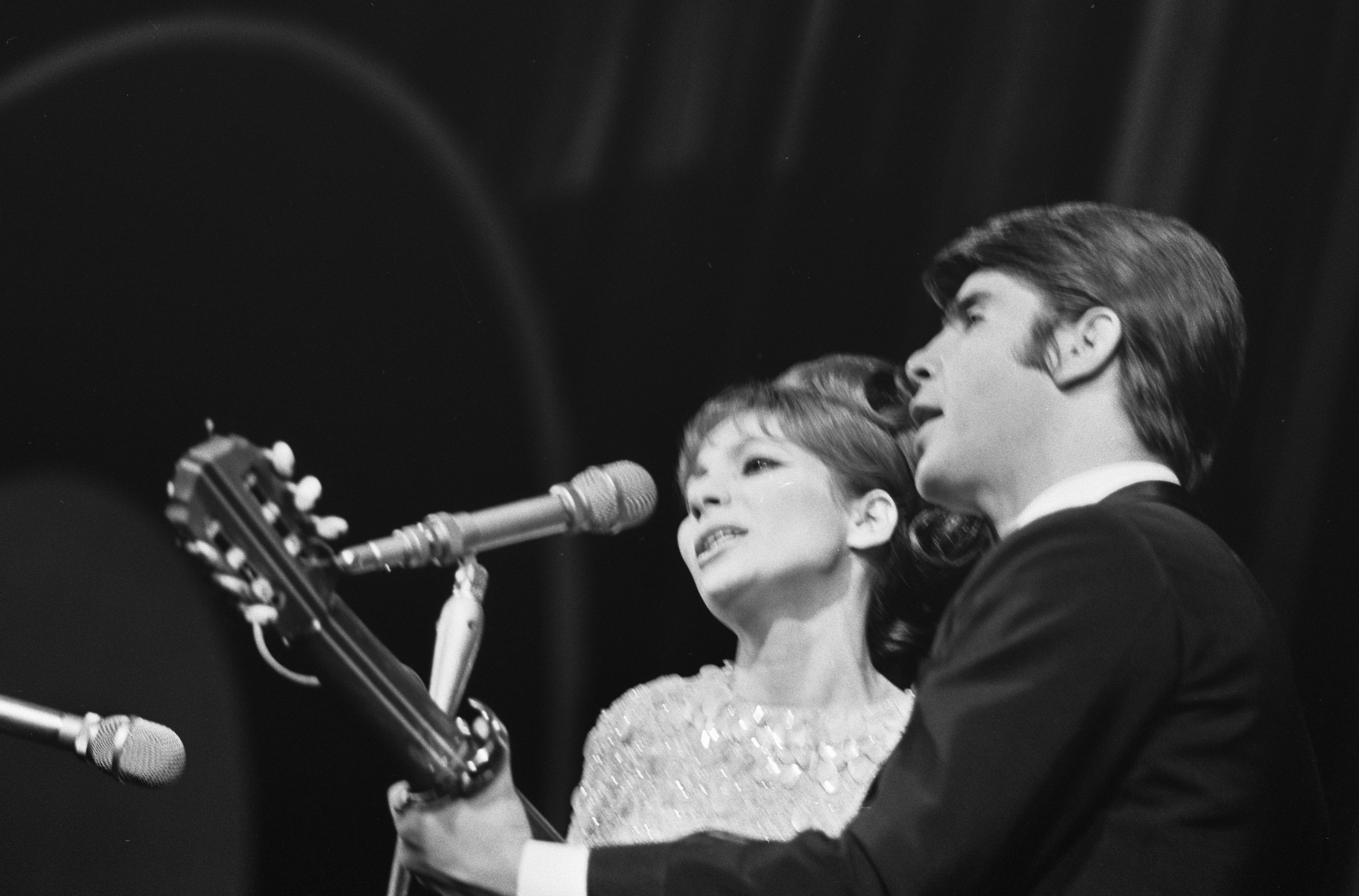
Esther & Abi Ofarim performing at the Grand Gala du Disque on October 2, 1965

Esther and Abi continued performing as a duo in nightclubs. They appeared as performers in the first German-Israeli feature film Burning Sands (1960). The duo rearranged old Jewish songs and released their debut album, Haofarim (Sings Israelic Ballads), on Israphon Records in 1961. In 1961, Esther won the first place in Israel's Song Festival. Esther and Abi released the album, Foibles and Fables, in 1962. Both albums were successful and were frequently played by the Kol Yisrael radio. Kol Israel sent Esther to the Sopot International Song Festival in Poland where she placed second.

In 1963, Esther and Abi settled in Geneva, Switzerland, and recorded songs in French, Italian, Hebrew and English for the local radio station Radio Suisse Romande. Esther represented Switzerland in the 1963 Eurovision Song Contest. After she placed second in the competition, the duo began recording for Philips Records in Germany. In 1963 (possibly to 1964) while in London, on one or possibly more occasions they recorded 4 songs in front of a live television audience for the UK regional television folk and blues music series Hullabaloo, presented by the Scottish folksinger Rory McEwen; these sessions were released on DVD in 2020. While appearing in the United States, they recorded an album of folk songs released as Esther Ofarim & Abraham. In Germany, the album was titled Songs der Welt (Songs of the World), peaking at No. 2 on the German Albums chart. They had a hit in the Netherlands with "One More Dance (Your Husband Is Worse)," which was released in December 1963 and reached No. 8 on the Dutch charts in 1964.

In 1966, Esther & Abi Ofarim had a hit with "Noch einen Tanz," which peaked at No. 32 in Germany and No. 6 in Austria. In December 1966, they donated $2,500 to the Delphin Foundation for Crippled Children in Germany. The gift was in appreciation of the response by the German public to their albums Neue Songs Der Welt (New Songs of the World) and Das Neue Esther & Abi Ofarim Album (The New Esther & Abi Ofarim). They became the top-selling pop act in West Germany since the war. Their album The New Esther & Abi Ofarim, which was produced by Abi, topped the German pop charts for many weeks. Their albums had sold more than one million copies in Germany alone by 1967.

At the height of their success in Germany, the duo were banned on Israeli Radio for a few years due to Germany–Israel relations. Despite the ban, which was implemented in 1963, The New Esther & Abi Ofarim was released as Sing Hallelujah! in Israel on Litratone Records in 1966.

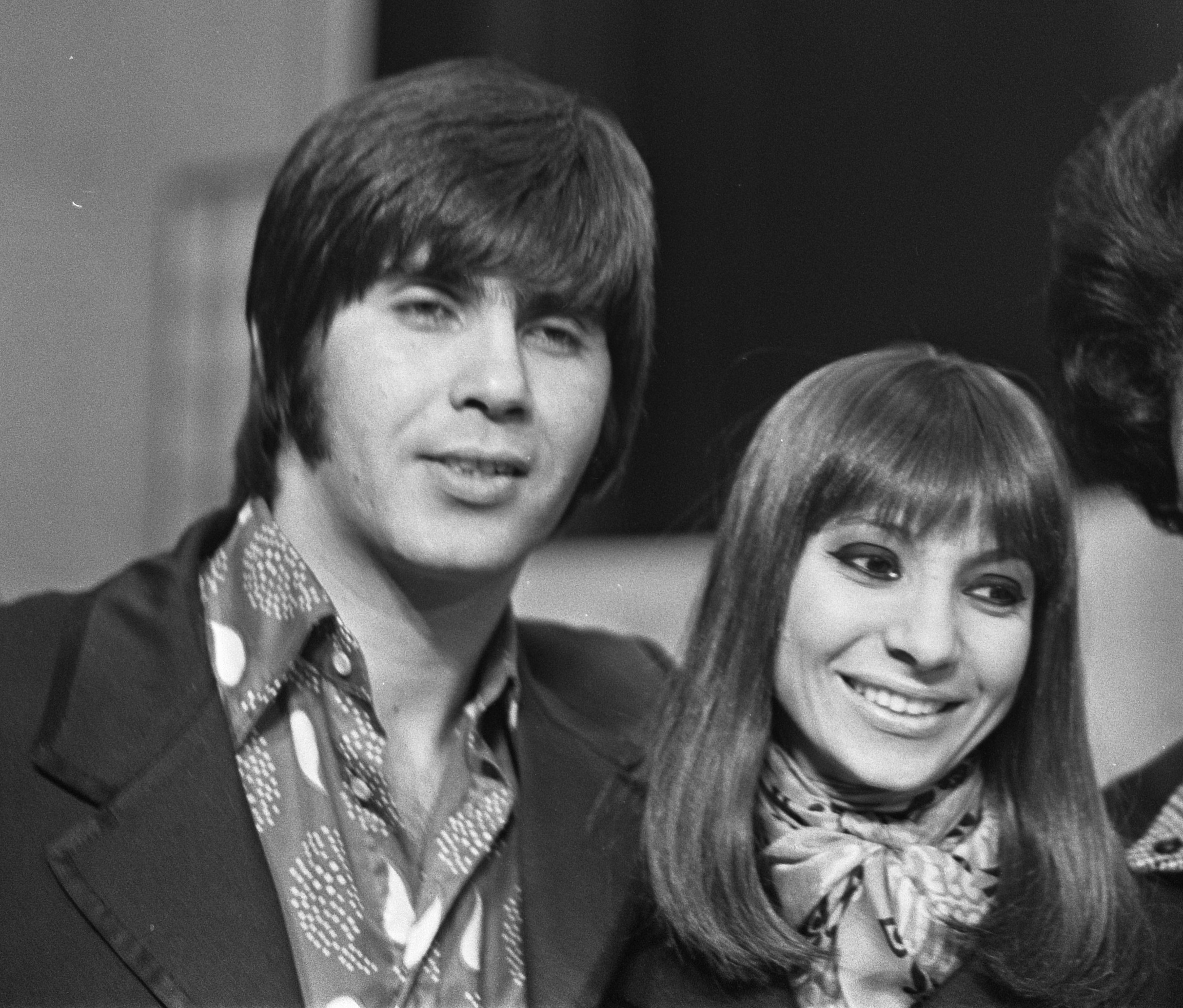
Esther & Abi Ofarim at the Grand Gala du Disque on March 6, 1968

The duo achieved their biggest hit in Germany with "Morning of My Life", which was written by the Bee Gees, peaking at No. 2 in 1967. They performed the song on the television special Gala-Abend der Schallplatte 1967 (Gala Disk Evenings 1967), the first color telecast in Europe, transmitted by Eurovision from Berlin.

In 1967, Esther & Abi Ofarim embarked on a successful international tour that included performances in the US and at The Savoy in London. Later that year, they released the album 2 In 3, which topped the German Albums chart and reached No. 6 on the UK Albums chart. The duo also received their third gold disk for one million international album sales.

While appearing on The Smothers Brothers Comedy Hour in 1967, the duo were presented with the song "Cinderella Rockefella", a novelty love duet written by Mason Williams and Nancy Ames. Esther & Abi Ofarim's performance of the song on the UK television show The Eamonn Andrews Show catapulted the song to success on the charts. It topped the UK Singles chart for three weeks in early 1968 and sold half a million copies. The single peaked at No. 68 on the US Billboard Hot 100 and reached the top 10 in several European countries. The duo had a successful top 20 follow-up single in the UK with "One More Dance," an English version of their 1966 German single "Noch einen Tanz."

In 1968, Esther & Abi Ofarim performed at Midem in Cannes, the Majorca Pop Jazz Festival in Spain, and the Grand Gala du Disque in Holland. They also performed for Queen Elizabeth at a Royal Variety Performance in London.

Recordings made during their European tour in 1969 were released as the live album Ofarim Concert – Live 1969, charting at No. 29 in the UK. Artistic differences strained the couple's relationship. They performed their last concert together in Cologne in March 1969 before separating. Their divorce was finalized in 1970.

== Selected discography ==
=== Studio albums ===
- 1961: Ha Ofarim (The Roes) (Israphon AP 201)
- 1962: Mousar Adin (Foibles and Fables) (Israphon AP 210)
- 1963: Esther Ofarim and Abraham (Songs der Welt) (Philips B48051L-840458BY-840438PY-PHM200102-PHS600102)
- 1964: Melodie einer Nacht (Philips P48104L)
- 1965: That's Our Song (Neue Songs der Welt) (Philips BL7698-652204BL-843750PY, Litratone 12135MS)
- 1966: Noch einen Tanz (Philips 843775PY)
- 1966: Sing Hallelujah! (Das Neue Ofarim Album) (Philips BL7757-P48141L-843920PY, Litratone 12134 MS)
- 1967: 2 in 3 (GER-UK-ESP-ISR) (Philips 838807JY-620209JL-620210JL, Phonodor 13004)
- 1967: Cinderella-Rockefella (FR) (Philips 844301BY)
- 1967: Cinderella-Rockefella (USA) (Philips PHS600269)
- 1968: Up to Date (GER-UK-ISR) (Philips 838808JY, Phonodor 12196)
- 1969: Ofarim Konzert-Live 1969 (GER) (Philips H72AM201)
- 1969: Ofarim Concert – Live 1969 (UK) (Philips 88422DY)
- 1969: Ofarim Concert – Live (USA) (Philips PHS600330)
- 1972: Rak Ivrit (Hebrew only) (Phonodor 13034)

=== Charted albums ===
Release date	Album	UK	GER	Notes
1963	Songs der Welt	—	2	Released as Esther Ofarim & Abraham in the US
1965	Melodie einer Nacht	—	9	
1965	Neue Songs der Welt	—	1	Released as That's Our Song in the UK
1966	Noch einen Tanz	—	3	
1966	Das neue Esther & Abi Ofarim Album	—	1	Released as Sing Hallelujah! in Israel Released as Sing! in the US Released as The New Esther & Abi Ofarim Album in the UK
1967	2 in 3	6	1	
1968	Up to Date	—	11	
1969	Ofarim Concert – Live 1969	29	14	
"—" denotes a recording that did not chart or was not released in that country.

=== Compilation albums ===
- 1965: Ester en Abraham Ofarim / Lieder und Songs (Philips)
- 1967: Esther + Abi Ofarim (Philips)
- 1967: 2. Folge (Philips)
- 1968: Songs & Hits (Philips)
- 1972: Esther & Abi Ofarim (Philips)
- 1972: Die Ofarim-Story (Philips)
- 1997: Songs of Our Life (Mercury)
- 2002: Meisterstücke (Mercury)

=== Charted singles ===
Release date	Single	US	UK	AT	BEL	CAN	GER	ISR	NL	NO	SWI	Album
1961	"Cha'yai Adam" (A Man's Life)	—	—	—	—	—	—	4	—	—	—	Cha'yai Adam (A Man's Life)
1963	"One More Dance (Your Husband Is Worse)"	—	—	—	—	—	—	—	8	—	—	Non-album tracks
1963	"Encore une danse" (One More Dance)	—	—	—	—	30	—	—	—	—	—	Non-album tracks
1964	"Noch einen Tanz" (One More Dance)	—	—	6	—	—	32	—	—	—	—	Noch Einen Tanz
1964	"Wenn ich bei dir sein kann" (Cotton Fields)	—	—	—	—	—	10	—	—	—	—	Melodie Einer Nacht
1966	"Sing Hallelujah"	—	—	—	—	—	30	—	—	—	—	Das Neue Esther & Abi Ofarim Album
1967	"Morning of My Life"	—	—	9	—	—	2	—	—	—	—	2 In 3
1968	"Cinderella Rockefella"	68	1	3	2	6	5	—	1	8	10	2 In 3
1968	"One More Dance"	—	13	—	—	—	—	—	—	—	—	Up To Date
"—" denotes a recording that did not chart or was not released in that country.
