= Den Nye By =

2008 album by The Dreams

Studio album by the Dreams
- Released: February 8, 2008
- Recorded: October–December 2007
- Genres: Pop-punk, alternative rock
- Length: 38:03
- Label: Apache Records
- Producer: Chief 1

The Dreams chronology
Tazy (2006)	Den Nye By (2008)	Revolt (2010)

Singles from Den Nye By
- 1. "La' mig være" Released: February 2008; 2. "Himlen Falder/Helvede Kalder" Released: May 2008; 3. "Backstabber" Released: October 2008

Den Nye By is the debut album by Faroese alternative rock band the Dreams, released on February 8, 2008. Published by Apache Records and recorded in the Chief Management Studio. Produced by Chief 1 (Lars Pedersen). The album comprises 11 songs all written in Danish.

Three successful singles were released from this album: "La' mig være", "Himlen Falder/Helvede Kalder" and "Backstabber".

== Release ==
They released their album at the same time their first music video "La' mig være", which directly moved into the lead in DR1 Boogie Listen. A second single, "Himlen Falder/Helvede Karlder", was released in May and also ranked first in DR1 Boogie Listen and Denmark's most popular music videos chart, finishing in the top three for ten weeks.

In October of that year, the single "Backstabber" went straight to number one in its first week in DR1 Boogie Listen and was listed in all 10 weeks as the only Danish band.

== Track listing ==
No.	Title	Length
1.	"Det fortabte slæng"	3:08
2.	"La' mig være"	2:46
3.	"Backstabber"	3:40
4.	"Ingen Kan Erstatte Dig"	4:14
5.	"Verden vil bedrages"	3:45
6.	"22 (Den Nye By)"	3:43
7.	"Alda"	3:30
8.	"Himlen Falder/Helvede Kalder"	3:12
9.	"Glem & Start Igen"	3:44
10.	"The rise and fall of du & jeg"	4:45
11.	"Efterspil"	3:36
Total length:		38:03

== Singles ==
Single	Chart (DEN)	Year
La' mig være	1	2008
Himlen Falder/Helvede Kalder	1	2008
Backstabber	1	2008

== Personnel ==
- Hans Edward Andreasen – vocals, guitar
- Heini Gilstón Corfitz Andersen – lead guitar, backing vocals
- Eirikur Gilstón Corfitz Andersen – bass, backing vocals
- Heini Mortensen - drums, percussion

== Den Nye By 09/Sakin Live ==
Den Nye By 09/Sakin Live

Live album by The Dreams
- Released: March 2, 2009
- Recorded: August, December 2008 – January 2009
- Genres: Pop-punk, alternative rock
- Length: 102:28
- Label: Black Pelican
- Producer: Chief 1

Singles from Den Nye By 09/Sakin Live
- 1. "25 (Den Nye By prt.2)" Released: December 2008; 2. "Ingen kan erstatte dig" Released: February 2009

Den Nye By 09/Sakin Live is a live album released on March 2, 2009. Published by their new record label Black Pelican and produced by Chief 1 (Lars Pedersen), the album contains the same songs from their debut album plus three new songs: "Snob", "Lorteliv" and "25 (Den Nye By prt.2)" and the history of the band in an interview with the producer.

Two singles were released from this album: "25 (Den Nye By prt.2)" and "Ingen kan erstatte dig", this music video is a concert that they did in the Faroe Islands.

=== Release ===
Before the release of the live album, the band released "25 (Den Nye By prt.2)", a continuation of the song "22 (Den Nye By)", as the first single in December 2008. In February 2009, "Ingen kan erstatte dig" was released as the second single, finding success in the DR1 Boogie Listen when it reached number four on its list.

The album was released March 2, 2009, followed by a grand tour of Denmark and Faroe Islands.

=== Track listing ===
No.	Title	Length
1.	"Det fortabte slæng"	3:08
2.	"Backstabber"	3:40
3.	"Ingen kan erstatte dig"	4:14
4.	"Verden vil bedrages"	3:45
5.	"Lorteliv"	3:20
6.	"Himlen Falder/Helvede Kalder"	3:12
7.	"22 (Den Nye By)"	3:43
8.	"Alda"	3:30
9.	"La' mig være"	2:43
10.	"Snob"	3:51
11.	"Glem & Start Igen"	3:44
12.	"The rise and fall of du & jeg"	4:45
13.	"Efterspil"	3:36
14.	"25 (Den Nye By prt.2)"	3:13
15.	"Himlen Falder/Helvede Kalder (Live)"	4:28
16.	"Glem & Start Igen (Live)"	4:18
17.	"Verden vil bedrages (Live)"	5:19
18.	"Ingen kan erstatte dig (Live)"	4:58
19.	"Backstabber (Live)"	4:05
20.	"Drømmenes Begyndelse (Historien om The Dreams)"	32:13
Total length:		102:28

=== Singles ===
Single	Chart (DEN)	Year
25 (Den Nye By prt.2)	-	2008
Ingen kan erstatte dig	4	2009

=== Personnel ===
- Hans Edward Andreasen – vocals, guitar
- Heini Gilstón Corfitz Andersen – lead guitar, backing vocals
- Eirikur Gilstón Corfitz Andersen – bass, backing vocals
- Heini Mortensen - drums, percussion
