= Denmark in the Eurovision Song Contest 2008 =

- Eurovision Song Contest 2008
- Participating broadcaster: Danmarks Radio (DR)
- Country: Denmark
- Selection process: Dansk Melodi Grand Prix 2008
- Selection date: 2 February 2008

Competing entry
- Song: "All Night Long"
- Artist: Simon Mathew
- Songwriters: Svend Gudiksen; Jacob Launbjerg; Nis Bøgvad

Placement
- Semi-final result: Qualified (3rd, 112 points)
- Final result: 15th, 60 points

Participation chronology

Denmark was represented at the Eurovision Song Contest 2008 with the song "All Night Long", written by Jacob Launbjerg, Svend Gudiksen, and Nis Bøgvad, and performed by Simon Mathew. The Danish participating broadcaster, Danmarks Radio (DR), organised the national final Dansk Melodi Grand Prix 2008 in order to select its entry for the contest. The national selection consisted of two televised semi-finals, a radio wildcard selection and a televised final. In the final, the winner was selected by regional televoting. "All Night Long" performed by Simon Mathew was the winner after gaining the most votes.

Denmark was drawn to compete in the second semi-final of the Eurovision Song Contest which took place on 22 May 2008. Performing during the show in position 13, "All Night Long" was announced among the 10 qualifying entries of the second semi-final and therefore qualified to compete in the final on 24 May. It was later revealed that Denmark placed third out of the 19 participating countries in the semi-final with 112 points. In the final, Denmark performed in position 16 and placed fifteenth out of the 25 participating countries, scoring 60 points.

== Background ==
Prior to the 2008 contest, Danmarks Radio (DR) had participated in the Eurovision Song Contest representing Denmark thirty-six times since its first entry in 1957. It had won the contest, to this point, on two occasions: in 1963 with the song "Dansevise" performed by Grethe and Jørgen Ingmann, and in 2000 with the song "Fly on the Wings of Love" performed by Olsen Brothers. In 2007, "Drama Queen" performed by DQ failed to qualify to the final.

As part of its duties as participating broadcaster, DR organises the selection of its entry in the Eurovision Song Contest and broadcasts the event in the country. The broadcaster confirmed its intentions to participate at the 2008 contest on 4 February 2007. DR has selected all of its Eurovision entries through the national final Dansk Melodi Grand Prix. Along with its participation confirmation, the broadcaster announced that Dansk Melodi Grand Prix 2008 would be organised in order to select its entry for the 2008 contest.

== Before Eurovision ==
=== Dansk Melodi Grand Prix 2008 ===
Dansk Melodi Grand Prix 2008 was the 38th edition of Dansk Melodi Grand Prix, the music competition organised by DR to select its entries for the Eurovision Song Contest. The event included two semi-finals held on 12 and 19 January 2008, followed by a radio wildcard selection between 21 and 25 February 2008, and a final held on 2 February 2008. All shows in the competition were hosted by Camilla Ottesen and Adam Duvå Hall and televised on DR1 as well as streamed online at the official DR website.

==== Format ====
Sixteen songs competed in the competition which consisted of two semi-finals and a final. Eight songs competed in each semi-final and the top four as determined exclusively by a public televote qualified to the final. Two wildcard selections featuring four of the remaining eight non-qualifying songs each were then held via radio on the stations DR P3 and DR P4, and listeners via televoting selected one song from each selection to qualify to the final. The winner in the final was determined again exclusively by a public televote. Viewers were able to vote via SMS during the televised shows and the wildcard selection.

==== Competing entries ====
DR opened a submission period between 24 August 2007 and 10 October 2007 for composers to submit their entries. All composers and lyricists were required to be Danish citizens or have a strong connection to Denmark. The broadcaster received 443 entries during the submission period. A selection committee selected sixteen songs from the entries submitted to the broadcaster, while the artists of the selected entries were chosen by DR in consultation with their composers. DR held a press meet and greet at the DR Byen in Copenhagen on 7 December 2007 where the competing artists and songs were announced and officially presented.

| Artist | Song | Songwriter(s) |
|---|---|---|
| Amin Jensen | "Luciano" | Amin Jensen, Jan Lysdahl |
| Anorah | "Laying Down My Cards" | Jonas Schrøder, Lucas Sieber |
| Camille and Ulrik | "Underneath the Moon" | Martin Sommer, Lene Dissing, Christian Warburg, Kåre Kabel Mai |
| Charlie | "Den jeg er" | Andreas Hemmeth, Carina Juul Jensen |
| The Dreams | "La' mig være" | Hans Edward Andreasen, Chief 1 |
| Gunhild | "Vilde hjerter" | Hans Henrik Koltze, Mads Løkkegaard, Rune Braager |
| Hassing and Hassing | "Come On Over" | Anne-Marie Hassing, Claus Hassing |
| Josefine and Lars | "Sweet Memories of You" | Marie Montell, Jacob Gurevitsch, Jonas Jeberg |
| Julie Rugaard | "Kan Ikke forstå" | Jens Simonsen, Julie Rugaard |
| Kendra Lou | "Until We're Satisfied" | Sascha Dupont, Jan Winther, Claus Christensen |
| Lasse Lindorff | "Hooked on You" | Lasse Lindorff, Mogens Binderup, Lise Cabble |
| Louise Victoria | "Grøn mand gå" | Anna Stengade, Lasse Kramhøft |
| Sandee May | "Spanish Soul" | Lars Nielsen, Niklas Nielsen, Gabril Willy Ssezibwa, René Prang, Sandie Rasmussen |
| Sidse Holte | "Vi er der om lidt" | Sidse Holte, Christian Juncker, Jakob Groth Bastiansen |
| Simon Mathew | "All Night Long" | Jacob Launbjerg, Svend Gudiksen, Nis Bøgvad |
| Unite | "Tree of Life" | Lars Nielsen, Niklas Nielsen, Gabriel Willy Ssezibwa, René Prang, Salar Walid |

==== Semi-finals ====
The two semi-finals took place on 12 and 19 January 2008 at the DR Studio 5 in Copenhagen. The top four of each semi-final advanced to the final based on a public televote. In addition to the performances of the competing entries, Aura and The Loft performed as the interval acts during the first semi-final, while Hej Matematik and Juanes performed as the interval acts during the second semi-final.

Semi-final 1 – 12 January 2008
| R/O | Artist | Song | Result |
|---|---|---|---|
| 1 | Anorah | "Laying Down My Cards" | Wildcard selection |
| 2 | Sidse Holte | "Vi er der om lidt" | Wildcard selection |
| 3 | Unite | "Tree of Life" | Final |
| 4 | Amin Jensen | "Luciano" | Final |
| 5 | Hassing and Hassing | "Come On Over" | Final |
| 6 | Louise Victoria | "Grøn mand gå" | Wildcard selection |
| 7 | Camille and Ulrik | "Underneath the Moon" | Wildcard selection |
| 8 | Charlie | "Den jeg er" | Final |

Semi-final 2 – 19 January 2008
| R/O | Artist | Song | Result |
|---|---|---|---|
| 1 | Gunhild | "Vilde hjerter" | Wildcard selection |
| 2 | Julie Rugaard | "Kan Ikke forstå" | Wildcard selection |
| 3 | Simon Mathew | "All Night Long" | Final |
| 4 | Kendra Lou | "Until We're Satisfied" | Wildcard selection |
| 5 | Josefine and Lars | "Sweet Memories of You" | Final |
| 6 | Sandee May | "Spanish Soul" | Final |
| 7 | Lasse Lindorff | "Hooked on You" | Wildcard selection |
| 8 | The Dreams | "La' mig være" | Final |

==== Wildcard selection ====
Listeners of DR P3 and DR P4 were able to vote for the songs competing in their respective groups between 21 and 25 January 2008. The song with the most votes in each group that advanced to the final were announced on 25 January 2008 during the radio programmes Mondo on P3 and Brødrene on P4.

P3 wildcard selection – 21–25 January 2008
| R/O | Artist | Song | Result |
|---|---|---|---|
| 1 | Louise Victoria | "Grøn mand gå" | —N/a |
| 2 | Anorah | "Laying Down My Cards" | —N/a |
| 3 | Julie Rugaard | "Kan ikke forstå" | —N/a |
| 4 | Kendra Lou | "Until We're Satisfied" | Final |

P4 wildcard selection – 21–25 January 2008
| R/O | Artist | Song | Result |
|---|---|---|---|
| 1 | Lasse Lindorff | "Hooked on You" | Final |
| 2 | Gunhild | "Vilde hjerter" | —N/a |
| 3 | Sidse Holte | "Vi er der om Lidt" | —N/a |
| 4 | Camille and Ulrik | "Underneath the Moon" | —N/a |

==== Final ====
The final took place on 2 February 2008 at the Forum Horsens in Horsens. The running order was determined by DR and announced on 24 January 2008. The winner, "All Night Long" performed by Simon Mathew, was selected solely by a public televote. The voting results of each of Denmark's five regions were converted to points which were distributed as follows: 4, 6, 8, 10 and 12 points. In addition to the performances of the competing entries, Anna David as well as Jamie Scott and the Town performed as the interval acts.

Final – 2 February 2008
| R/O | Artist | Song | Televoting Regions | | | | | Total | Place |
| R/O | Artist | Song | Northern Denmark | Central Denmark | Southern Denmark | Zealand | Capital Region | Total | Place |
|---|---|---|---|---|---|---|---|---|---|
| 1 | Hassing and Hassing | "Come On Over" | 10 | | | | | 10 | 6 |
| 2 | Simon Mathew | "All Night Long" | 12 | 10 | 12 | 6 | 8 | 48 | 1 |
| 3 | Amin Jensen | "Luciano" | | | 4 | 4 | | 8 | 7 |
| 4 | Kendra Lou | "Until We're Satisfied" | | 6 | 6 | | 4 | 16 | 4 |
| 5 | Unite | "Tree of Life" | 6 | 8 | 10 | 10 | 12 | 46 | 2 |
| 6 | Lasse Lindorff | "Hooked on You" | | | | | 6 | 6 | 9 |
| 7 | Charlie | "Den jeg er" | | | | | | 0 | 10 |
| 8 | Josefine and Lars | "Sweet Memories of You" | 8 | | | | | 8 | 7 |
| 9 | The Dreams | "La' mig være" | | 4 | | 12 | | 16 | 4 |
| 10 | Sandee May | "Spanish Soul" | 4 | 12 | 8 | 8 | 10 | 42 | 3 |

==== Ratings ====
Viewing figures by show
| Show | Date | Viewers | Ref. |
|---|---|---|---|
| Semi-final 1 | 12 January 2008 | 990,000 | |
| Semi-final 2 | 19 January 2008 | 928,000 | |
| Final | 2 February 2008 | 1,308,000 | |

== At Eurovision ==
It was announced in September 2007 that the competition's format would be expanded to two semi-finals in 2008. According to Eurovision rules, all nations with the exceptions of the host country and the "Big Four" (France, Germany, Spain, and the United Kingdom) are required to qualify from one of two semi-finals in order to compete for the final; the top nine songs from each semi-final as determined by televoting progress to the final, and a tenth was determined by back-up juries. The European Broadcasting Union (EBU) split up the competing countries into six different pots based on voting patterns from previous contests, with countries with favourable voting histories put into the same pot. On 28 January 2008, a special allocation draw was held which placed each country into one of the two semi-finals. Denmark was placed into the second semi-final, to be held on 22 May 2008. The running order for the semi-finals was decided through another draw on 17 March 2008 and as one of the six wildcard countries, Denmark chose to perform in position 13, following the entry from Bulgaria and before the entry from Georgia.

The two semi-finals (with the first semi-final airing on a one-hour delay) and final were broadcast on DR1 with commentary by Nikolaj Molbech. DR appointed Lise Rønne as its spokesperson to announce the Danish votes during the final.

=== Semi-final ===
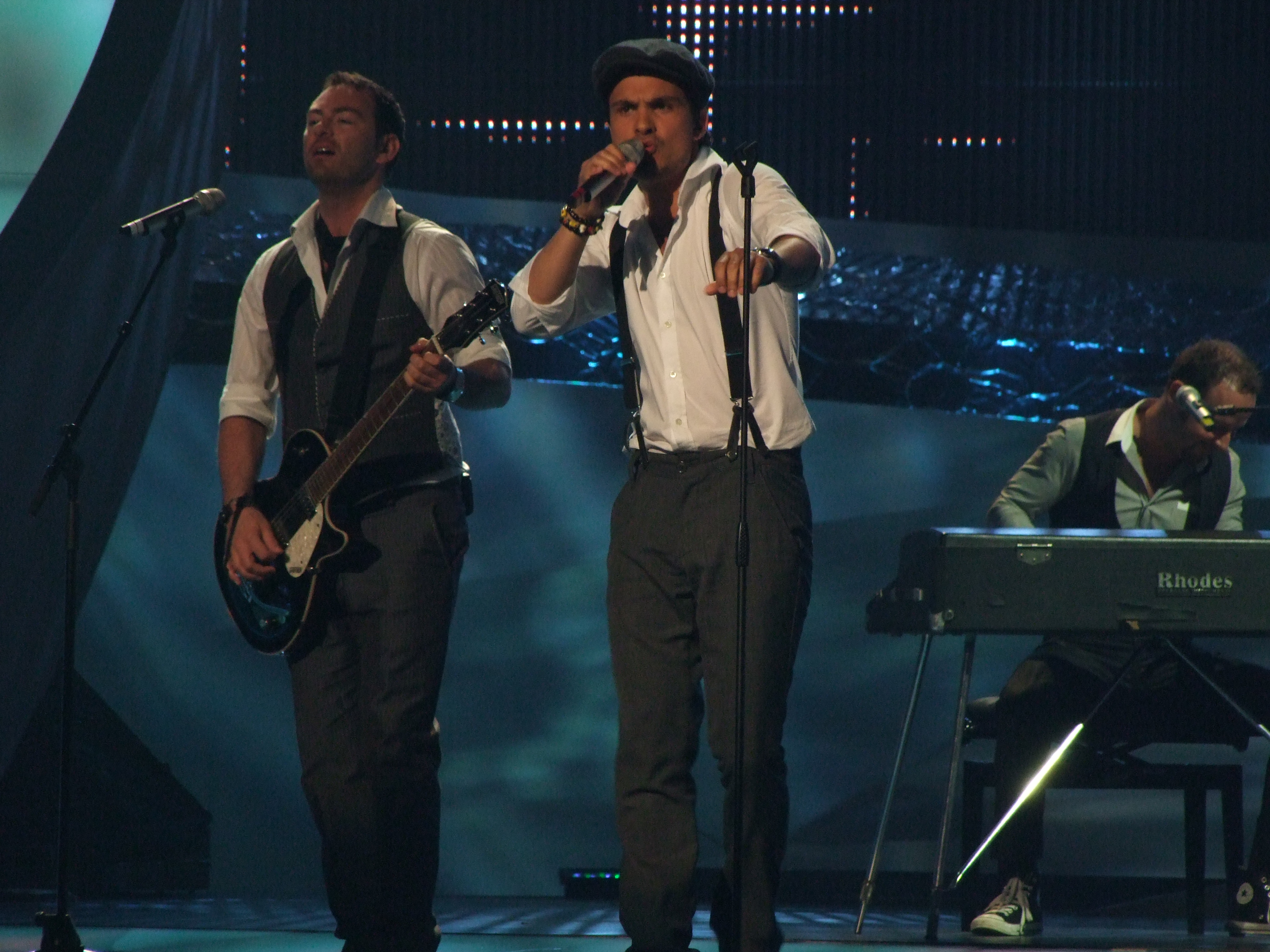
Simon Mathew performing during the second semi-final

Simon Mathew took part in technical rehearsals on 14 and 18 May, followed by dress rehearsals on 21 and 22 May. The Danish performance featured Simon Mathew dressed in a white shirt, braces and a vintage hat and performing with two guitar players, a keyboard player, a drummer and a backing vocalist. The LED screens displayed fireworks in blue, white and purple colours. The musicians that joined Simon Mathew were: Anders Øhrstrøm, Kim Nowak-Zorde, Morten Hellmann and Oliver McEwan, while the backing vocalist was Mette Dahl Trudslev.

At the end of the show, Denmark was announced as having finished in the top 10 and subsequently qualifying for the grand final. It was later revealed that Denmark placed third in the semi-final, receiving a total of 112 points.

=== Final ===
Shortly after the second semi-final, a winners' press conference was held for the ten qualifying countries. As part of this press conference, the qualifying artists took part in a draw to determine the running order of the final. This draw was done in the order the countries appeared in the semi-final running order. Denmark was drawn to perform in position 16, following the entry from Sweden and before the entry from Georgia.

Simon Mathew once again took part in dress rehearsals on 23 and 24 May before the final. Simon Mathew performed a repeat of his semi-final performance during the final on 24 May. At the conclusion of the voting, Denmark finished in fifteenth place with 60 points. The final of the contest was watched by a total of 965 thousand viewers in Denmark.

=== Voting ===
Below is a breakdown of points awarded to Denmark and awarded by Denmark in the second semi-final and grand final of the contest. The nation awarded its 12 points to Sweden in the semi-final and to Iceland in the final of the contest.

==== Points awarded to Denmark ====
Points awarded to Denmark (Semi-final 2)
| Score | Country |
|---|---|
| 12 points | Hungary; Iceland; Sweden |
| 10 points | Czech Republic |
| 8 points | Latvia; Lithuania; Portugal |
| 7 points | |
| 6 points | |
| 5 points | Cyprus; Switzerland |
| 4 points | Albania; Belarus; France; Malta; Ukraine |
| 3 points | Croatia; Georgia; Macedonia |
| 2 points | Bulgaria |
| 1 point | United Kingdom |

Points awarded to Denmark (Final)
| Score | Country |
|---|---|
| 12 points | Iceland; Norway |
| 10 points | |
| 8 points | |
| 7 points | Latvia |
| 6 points | |
| 5 points | Portugal; Sweden |
| 4 points | Malta |
| 3 points | Estonia; United Kingdom |
| 2 points | Czech Republic; Hungary; Lithuania; San Marino |
| 1 point | Ireland |

==== Points awarded by Denmark ====
Points awarded by Denmark (Semi-final 2)
| Score | Country |
|---|---|
| 12 points | Sweden |
| 10 points | Iceland |
| 8 points | Turkey |
| 7 points | Ukraine |
| 6 points | Latvia |
| 5 points | Switzerland |
| 4 points | Malta |
| 3 points | Croatia |
| 2 points | Macedonia |
| 1 point | Hungary |

Points awarded by Denmark (Final)
| Score | Country |
|---|---|
| 12 points | Iceland |
| 10 points | Norway |
| 8 points | Sweden |
| 7 points | Ukraine |
| 6 points | Latvia |
| 5 points | France |
| 4 points | Turkey |
| 3 points | Greece |
| 2 points | Bosnia and Herzegovina |
| 1 point | Spain |
