= Simon Mathew =

Danish pop singer (born 1984)

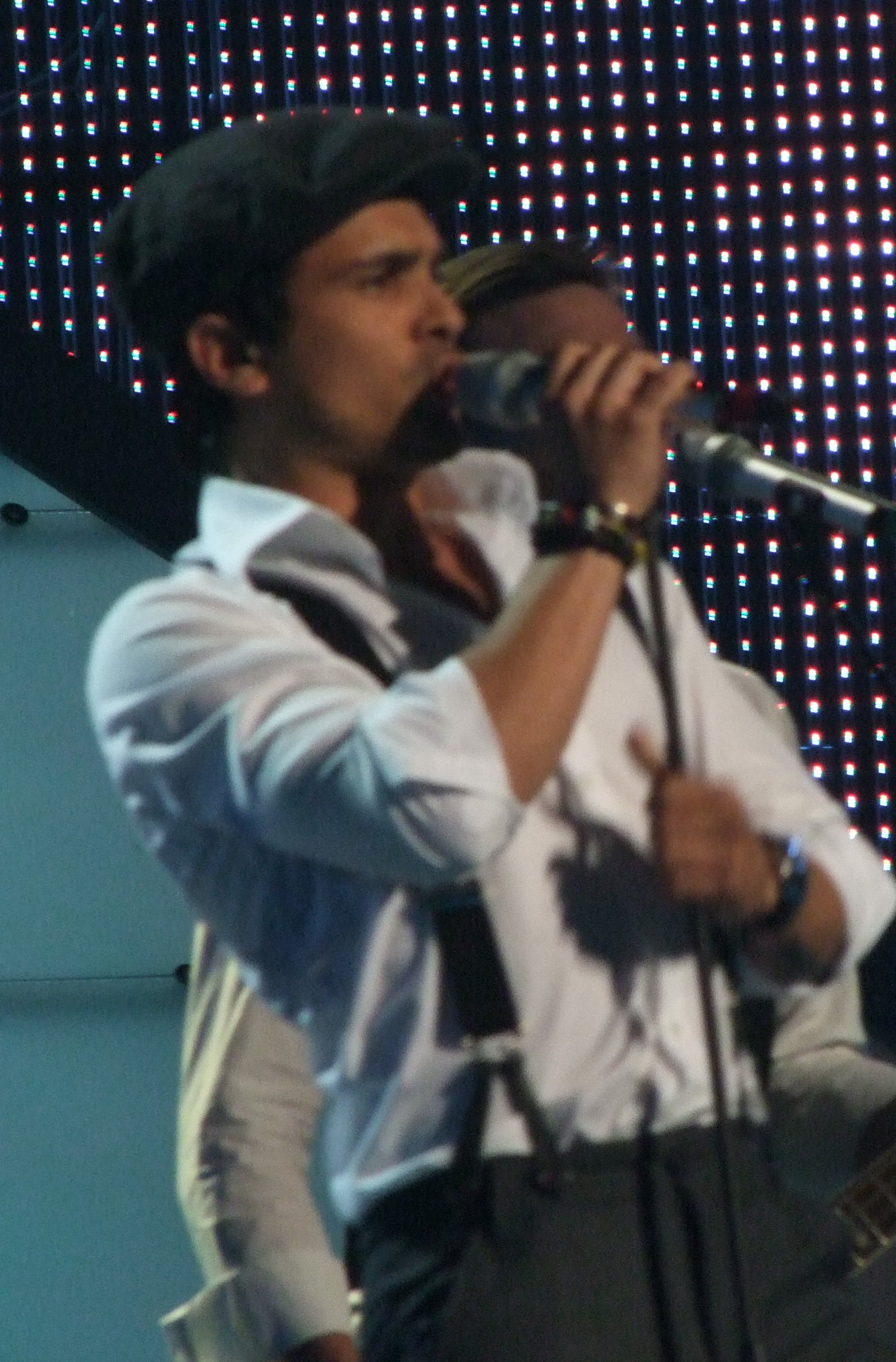
- Simon Mathew at the Eurovision Song Contest 2008.

Background information
- Born: 17 May 1984 (age 41); Hirtshals, Denmark
- Genres: Pop, R&B, soul, blues
- Occupations: Singer, songwriter
- Years active: 2005–present
- Website: simonmathew.dk

Simon Mathew (born 17 May 1984) is a Danish pop singer. He is the brother of teen-pop singers Rebekka Mathew and Sabina Mathew. Mathew won the Danish Melodi Grand Prix 2008, and represented Denmark at the Eurovision Song Contest 2008, singing "All Night Long". He placed 15th in the grand final.

Mathew debuted with his first solo album in 2005; an album which became classified as melodic rock. Mathew's first single, "These Arms" stayed in the Danish national hitlist Tjeklisten for 5 consecutive weeks, and sat in the top 3 of the official single sales chart. Mathew's 2nd single, 'Dreamer" received exposure and support through local Danish radio stations and stayed at number one on the local radio hitlist for a number of weeks.

== Discography ==
=== Albums ===
- Simon Mathew (2005)
- All For Fame (2008)

=== Singles ===
- "These Arms" (2005) – # 3 in Denmark
- "You Are the Music in Me" (2007)
- "Illusion" with Ida Corr (2009)

Preceded by DQ with Drama Queen	Denmark in the Eurovision Song Contest; 2008	Succeeded by Niels Brinck with Believe Again
