= Toots Thielemans =

Belgian jazz musician (1922–2016)

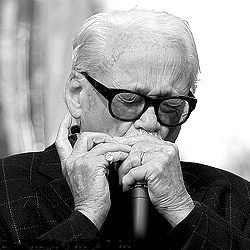
- Thielemans in 2006

Background information
- Born: Jean-Baptiste Frédéric Isidor Thielemans; 29 April 1922; Brussels, Belgium
- Died: 22 August 2016 (aged 94) Braine-l'Alleud, Belgium
- Genre: Jazz
- Occupations: Musician; composer
- Instruments: Harmonica; guitar; accordion
- Years active: 1949–2014

Jean-Baptiste Frédéric Isidor, Baron Thielemans (29 April 1922 – 22 August 2016), known professionally as Toots Thielemans ([tuts tiləmans]), was a Belgian jazz musician. He was mostly known for playing the chromatic harmonica, as well as his guitar and whistling skills, and composing. According to jazz historian Ted Gioia, his most important contribution was in "championing the humble harmonica", which Thielemans made into a "legitimate voice in jazz". He eventually became the "preeminent" jazz harmonica player.

His first professional performances were with Benny Goodman's band when they toured Europe in 1949 and 1950. He emigrated to the U.S. in 1951, becoming a citizen in 1957. From 1953 to 1959 he played with George Shearing, and then led his own groups on tours in the U.S. and Europe. In 1961 he recorded and performed live one of his own compositions, "Bluesette", which featured him playing guitar and whistling. In the 1970s and 1980s, he continued touring and recording, appearing with musicians such as Oscar Peterson, Elis Regina, Caetano Veloso, Ella Fitzgerald, Ivan Lins, Sarah Vaughan, Bill Evans, Dizzy Gillespie, Kenny Werner, Pat Metheny, Jaco Pastorius, Mina Mazzini, Quincy Jones, George Shearing, Natalie Cole, Billy Joel, Paul Simon, and Paquito D'Rivera.

Thielemans recorded the soundtracks for The Pawnbroker (1964), The Reivers (1969), Midnight Cowboy (1969), The Getaway (1972), Cinderella Liberty (1973), Turkish Delight (1973 film), The Sugarland Express (1974) and Looking for Mr. Goodbar (1977). His harmonica theme song for the popular Sesame Street TV show was heard for 40 years. He often performed and recorded with Quincy Jones, who once called him "one of the greatest musicians of our time." In 2009 he was designated a Jazz Master by the National Endowment for the Arts, the highest honor for a jazz musician in the United States.

== Early years ==
Thielemans was born in Brussels on 29 April 1922. His parents owned a café. He began playing music at an early age, using a homemade accordion at age three. During the German occupation of Belgium beginning in 1940, he became attracted to jazz, but was then playing on a full-size accordion or a harmonica, which he taught himself to play in his teens.

After being introduced to the music of Belgian-born jazz guitarist Django Reinhardt, he became inspired to teach himself guitar, which he did by listening to Reinhardt's recordings. At the time he was a college student majoring in mathematics. By the war's end in 1945, he considered himself a full-time musician. He said in 1950, "Django is still one of my main influences, I think, for lyricism. He can make me cry when I hear him." During an interview in 1988, he recalled, "I guess I was born at the right time to live and adapt and be touched by the evolution in the jazz language."

== Career ==
=== 1940s–1950s ===
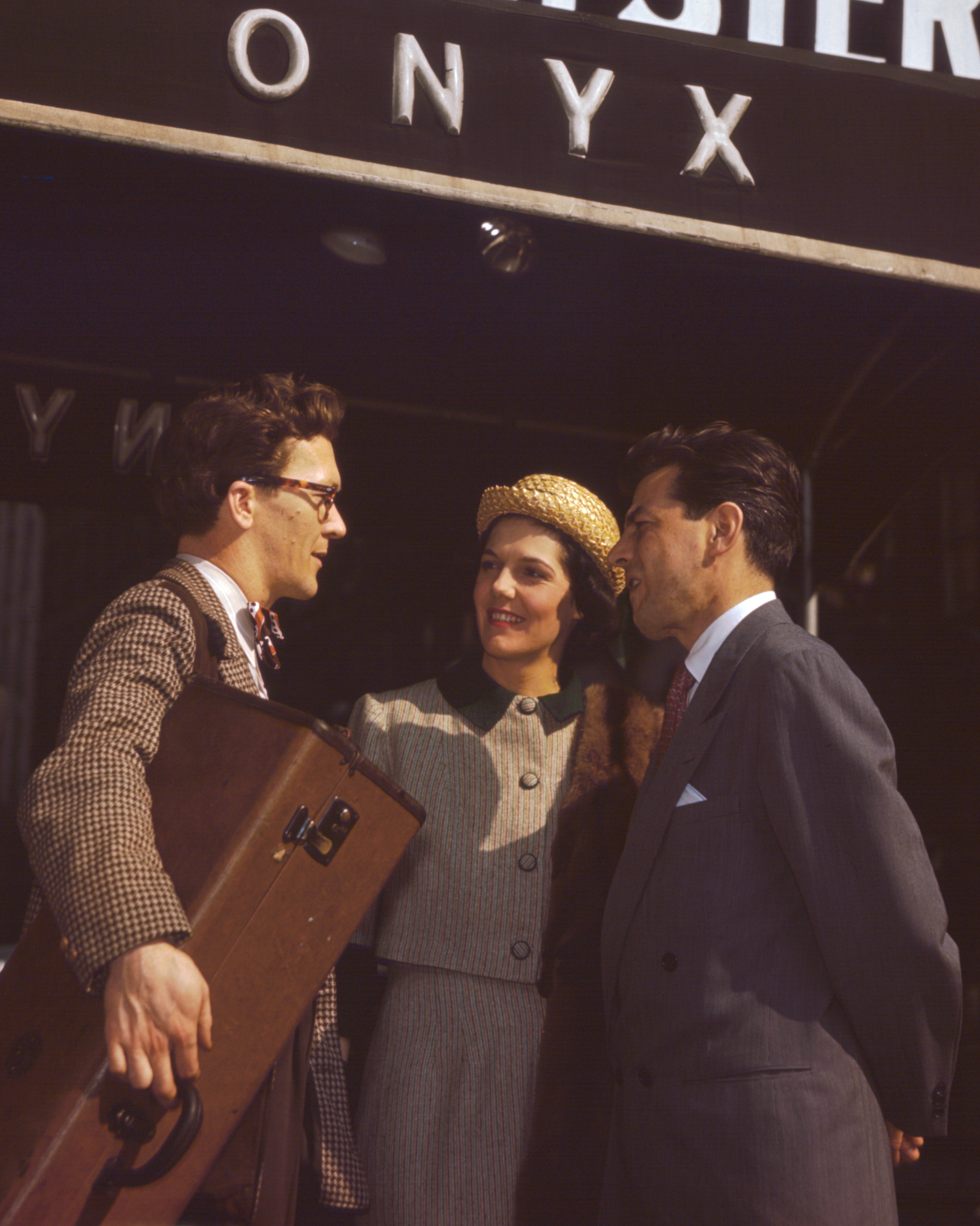
Thielemans, Adele Girard and Joe Marsala in front of the Onyx Club, 1948

I used to think the chromatic had limits. But with the advent of Toots Thielemans, I have come to feel that the limitations are within the player. Because as far as I can see, Toots has no limitations.

— Jazz harmonica player Charles Leighton

In 1949 Thielemans joined a jam session in Paris with Sidney Bechet, Charlie Parker, Miles Davis, Max Roach and others. He first heard the faster bebop style of jazz from records by Parker and Dizzy Gillespie after they had reached Belgium after the war. They became his musical "prophets". As his small collection of jazz records grew, the music of Benny Goodman and Lester Young began to impress him the most.

During a visit to the U.S. in 1948, an agent of Benny Goodman heard him play at a small New York music club. Not long after he returned to his home in Belgium, he received a letter inviting him to join Goodman's band while they toured in Europe. He readily accepted the invitation and joined their tours in 1949 and 1950. During the tour, Goodman was "shocked" when he learned that these tours were the first time Thielemans had earned money from his playing. Although Thielemans was hired on as a guitarist, when Goodman's group debuted at the London Palladium, he played the harmonica due to union restrictions.

During those years he also made his first record with fellow band member, tenor saxophonist Zoot Sims. In 1951 he toured with singer-songwriter and compatriot Bobbejaan Schoepen, performing strictly as a guitarist.

Thielemans moved to the United States in 1952 where he was a member of Charlie Parker's All-Stars and worked with Miles Davis and Dinah Washington. In 1957 he became a U.S. citizen. From 1953 to 1959 he played guitar and harmonica with the George Shearing Quintet. With Shearing, he added whistling to his repertoire. While Thielemans was playing in Hamburg in 1960 on tour with Shearing, a young musician and observer —John Lennon— noticed that Thielemans played a Rickenbacker guitar. Lennon was impressed, and felt he had to have one as well, on the principle that "if it was good enough for Thielemans it was good enough for me." Lennon and the Beatles helped make Rickenbacker guitars world-famous.

In 1955 Thielmans recorded his first album as a band leader, The Sound. During the 1950s, Thielemans had dominated the "miscellaneous instrument" category in Down Beat magazine's poll. Jerry Murad, of Jerry Murad's Harmonicats recalls Thielemans's mastery:

Toots played the harmonica in much the same manner that many of the great jazz artists of that time played their respective instruments. No one played harmonica like Toots. I felt like throwing my harmonica away.

From 1959 on he toured internationally with his small group along with intermittently recording in the studio. He recorded with singers and musicians including Ella Fitzgerald, Pat Metheny, Jaco Pastorius, Stephane Grappelli, J.J. Johnson, Oscar Peterson, Shirley Horn, Joe Pass, and jazz pianist Bill Evans, among others. Thielemans says that his recording with Evans's trio, Affinity, (1979) was one of his favorites.

=== 1960s–1970s ===
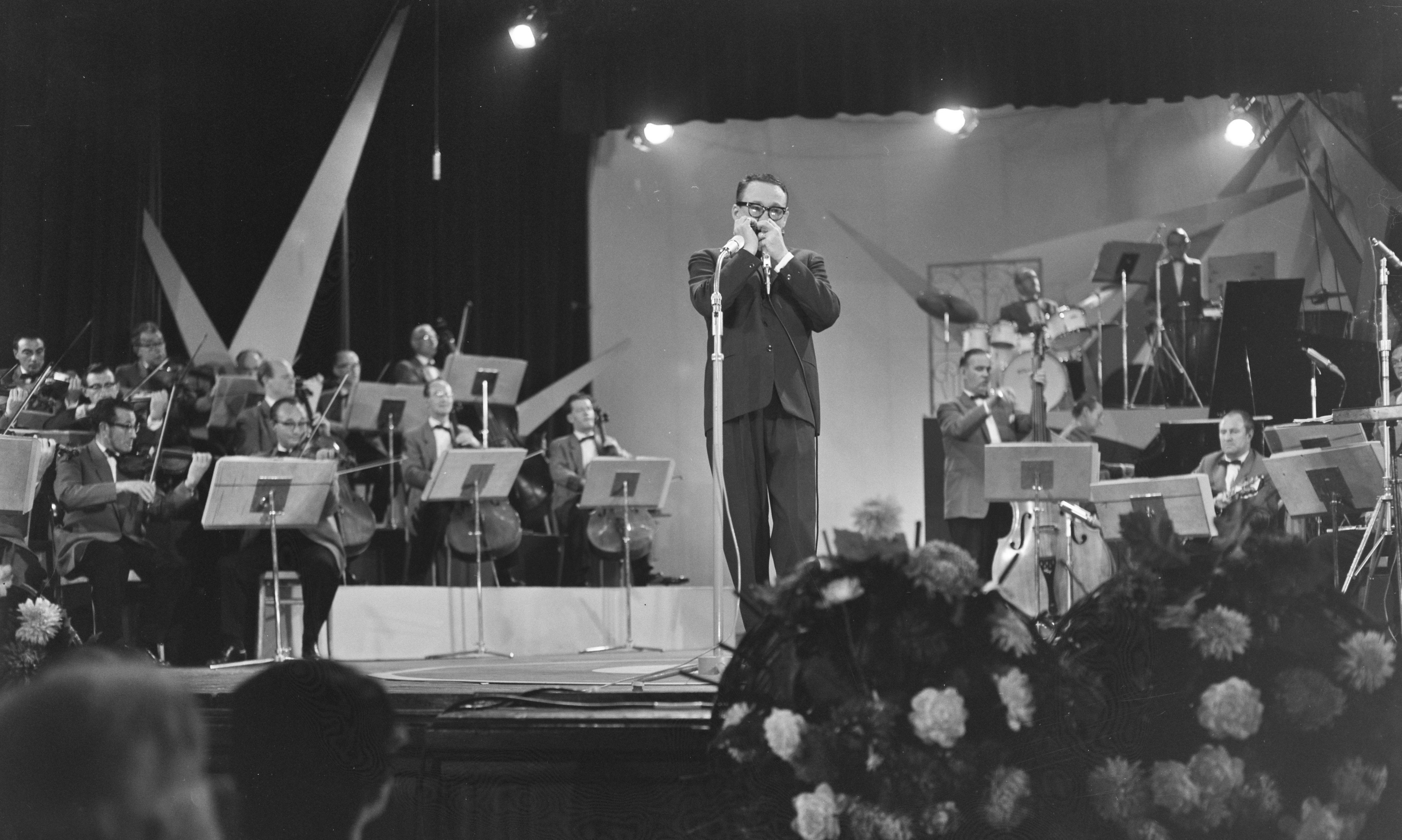
Thielemans in 1961 (Grand Gala du Disque, The Hague)

Thielemans wrote "Bluesette", a jazz standard, which he performed on harmonica or while playing the guitar and whistling in unison. He said, "If there's a piece of music that describes me, it's that song." First recorded by him in 1962, with lyrics added by Norman Gimbel, the song became a major worldwide hit. It has since been covered by over one hundred artists. Toots also wrote the ballad "Ladyfingers", which appeared on Herb Alpert and the Tijuana Brass's album Whipped Cream & Other Delights.

He worked both as a bandleader and as a sideman, including many projects with composer/arranger Quincy Jones. In the 1960s he performed on television with Peggy Lee. In 1969 he recorded "Honeysuckle Rose Aquarela Do Brasil" with singer Elis Regina and performed with her on Swedish television special.

During his career he performed on many film soundtracks, such as The Pawnbroker (1964), Midnight Cowboy (1969), The Getaway (1972), Turkish Delight (1973), Cinderella Liberty (1973), The Sugarland Express (1974), The Yakuza (1974), Looking for Mr. Goodbar (1977), The Wiz (1978), Jean de Florette (1986), and French Kiss (1995). His closing theme to the popular Sesame Street television show was heard for 40 years.

His music was heard on the Belgian television series Witse, and in the Netherlands, for the Baantjer program. He composed the music for the 1974 Swedish film Dunderklumpen!, in which he also provided the voice of the animated character Pellegnillot. His whistling and harmonica playing was heard on Old Spice commercials in the 1960s. He played harmonica on "Night Game" on Paul Simon's 1975 album Still Crazy After All These Years.

=== 1980s and later ===
Thielemans has the ultimate in technique and fantastic musical ideas of mood and expression—an unbelievable ability to translate these ideas from his mind through the instrument.

— Arranger and harmonica player Richard Hayman

During the early 1980s Thielemans was a guest a number of times on Late Night with David Letterman. He performed with the bassist Jaco Pastorius, and in 1983 he contributed to Billy Joel's album An Innocent Man, playing on the song "Leave a Tender Moment Alone." A year later, he appeared on the Julian Lennon song "Too Late for Goodbyes" from the album Valotte.

In 1984 he recorded with Billy Eckstine on the singer's final album (I Am a Singer), featuring ballads and standards arranged and conducted by Angelo DiPippo. In the 1990s, Thielemans embarked on theme projects that included world music. In 1998 he released a French-flavoured album titled Chez Toots featuring guest singer Johnny Mathis.

During those years he often recorded songs as personal tributes to those who were influential during his career. On Chez Toots, for example, he included "Dance For Victor", which he dedicated to his sometimes keyboard accompanist, Victor Feldman. Similarly, he recorded "Waltz for Sonny" as a tribute to saxophonist Sonny Rollins. In June 1998, at Germany's Jazzbaltica, he paid tribute to Frank Sinatra who died a month earlier. And during the first Caspian Jazz and Blues Festival in Azerbaijan in 2002, he performed his recorded version of "Imagine", his tribute to its writer, John Lennon.

Thielemans was well liked for his modesty and kind demeanor in his native Belgium, and was known for describing himself as a Brussels "ket", which means "street kid" in old Brussels slang.

== Later life ==
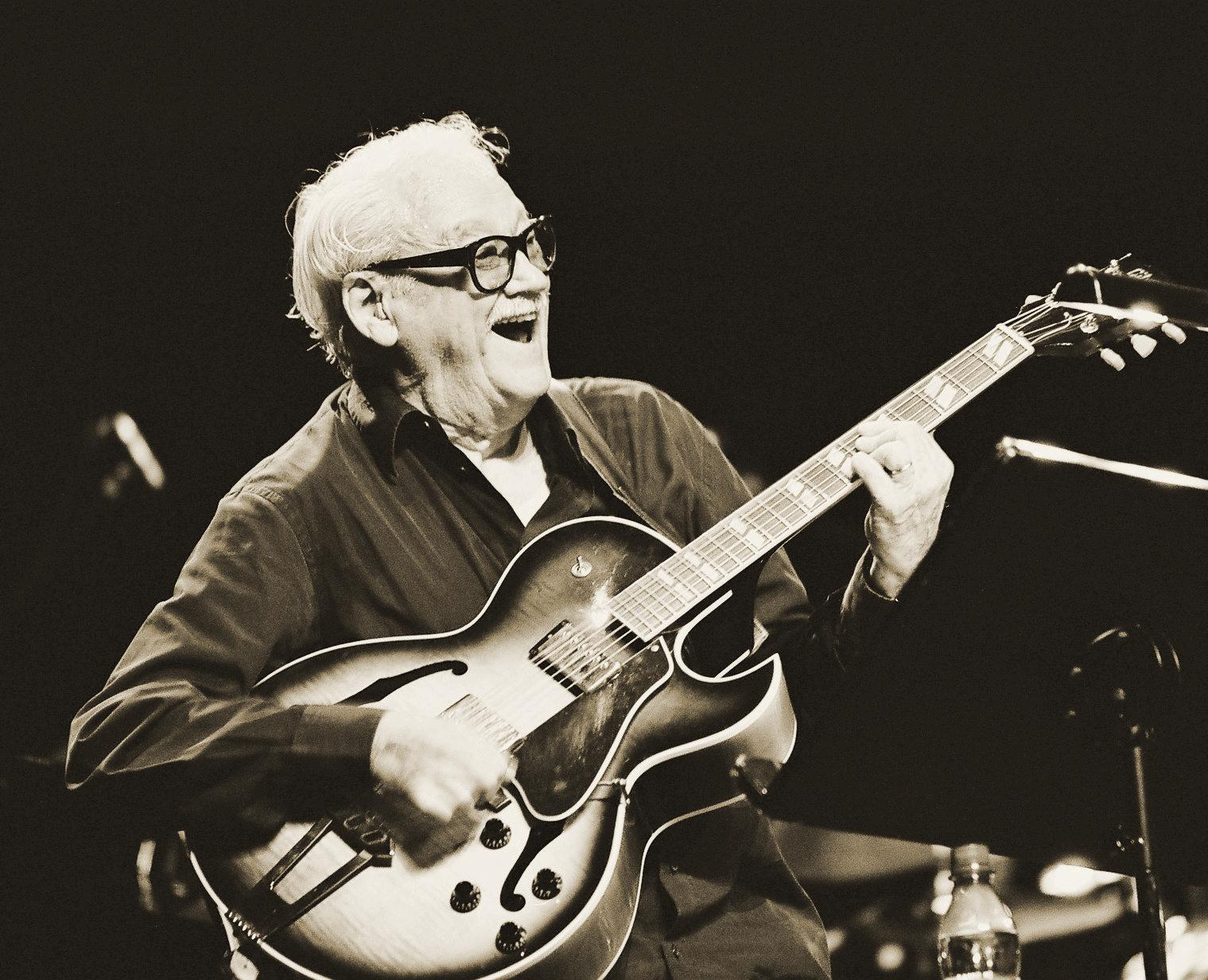
Toots Thielemans in Duisburg, 2005

Thielemans was nominated for the title of the Greatest Belgian in 2005. In the Flemish version, he finished in 20th place, and in the Walloon version he came 44th. On 23 January 2009, he joined guitarist Philip Catherine on stage at the Liberchies church (Belgium) in memory of the 100th anniversary of the birth of Django Reinhardt. In 2012 the Jazz at Lincoln Center concerts in New York celebrated Thieleman's 90th birthday with, among others, Herbie Hancock, Eliane Elias, and Kenny Werner. He performed for the occasion and left the stage standing among his friends.

Because of health issues that led to show cancellations, Thielemans announced his retirement on 12 March 2014, cancelling all scheduled concerts. He was also hospitalized for a broken arm. His manager stated that Thielemans "wants to enjoy the rest he deserves." However, he did make one more stage appearance, unannounced, in August 2014, at the Jazz Middelheim Festival in Antwerp.

== Death ==
Thielemans died on 22 August 2016 in Braine-l'Alleud, Belgium, at the age of 94.

After the announcement, the Netherlands-based jazz and pop orchestra Metropole Orkest, along with American musician Quincy Jones, performed at London's Royal Albert Hall in Thielemans' honor. Another concert was performed at the Grand-Place, Brussels.

Thielemans was buried on 27 August 2016 in La Hulpe just outside Brussels. Pianist Kenny Werner read a personal message from U.S. President Barack Obama for his widow, Huguette. It read: "Dear Huguette. I was deeply saddened when I heard about your husband's passing. I hope that shared memories will soften your suffering. Lift faith from the support of friends and family. Know that you will be in my thoughts for the next days. May Toots' music lead you and offer you consolation. I'm sure it will do this for all of us."

== Toots Thielemans Collection ==
In December 2016, the Music Division of the Royal Library of Belgium acquired the Toots Thielemans Collection. The collection consists of hundreds of sound recordings (78 rpm, vinyl records and CDs) and thousands of documents, such as photographs, press articles, scores, letters and concert programmes.

== Honours and awards ==
Thielemans received a joint honorary doctorate from the Université libre de Bruxelles and the Vrije Universiteit Brussel, Belgium. In 2001, he was raised into the Belgian nobility by King Albert II and created Baron Thielemans for life, this in recognition of his contribution to music. Herewith, he chose the motto Be yourself, no more no less.

In 2006 Thielemans was honoured by an all-star tribute concert for him at Carnegie Hall. Pianist Herbie Hancock and clarinetist Paquito D'Rivera were among the performers. In 2009, he was awarded the highest U.S. honour that can be accorded to a jazz musician, the distinction of "Jazz Master", by The National Endowment for the Arts. He was celebrated by a Google Doodle on his 100th birthday, 29 April 2022.

In 2020 the Brussels public transport authority began work on the Toots Thielemans Metro station. It will form part of the extension of Metro Line 3 and is expected to come into service in 2025.

=== Titles of Honour ===
- Commander in the Belgian Order of Leopold
- Knight in the Belgian Order of Leopold II
- Knight in the French Order of Arts and Letters
- Commander in the Brazilian Order of Rio Branco
- Created "Baron Thielemans" by Royal Order
- Honorary doctorate of the universities ULB and VUB
- Thielemans was honorary citizen of Dinant, Molenbeek, Sint-Amands and La Hulpe
- Brussels Region awarded Thielemans a Bronze Zinneke Award: 2006

=== Awards ===
- Grammy Award nomination for Best Instrumental Theme "Bluesette": 1964
- DownBeat winner Miscellaneous Instruments (harmonica): 1978->1996, 1999->2008, 2011, 2012
- Grammy Award nomination for Best Large Jazz Ensemble Album "Affinity": 1980
- Grammy Award nomination for Best Jazz Instrumental Solo "Bluesette": 1992
- Zamu Music Lifetime Achievement Award: 1994
- North Sea Jazz Bird Award: 1995
- Grammy Award for Best Engineered Album, Non-Classical "Q's Jook Joint": 1997
- Edison Jazz Career Award: 2001
- German Jazz Trophy: 2004
- Octaves de la Musique Album of the Year "One More for the Road": 2006
- Klara Career Prize: 2007
- NEA Jazz Master Award: 2009
- Concertgebouw Jazz Award: 2009
- San Sebastian Jazz Festival Premio Donostiako: 2011
- Honorary member of the Union of Performing Artists: 2011
- French Académie Charles Cros Career Award: 2012
- Music Industry Lifetime Achievement Award: 2017
- IFMCA Award nomination - Best Film Music Compilation Album The Cinema of Quincy Jones: 2017

=== Other ===
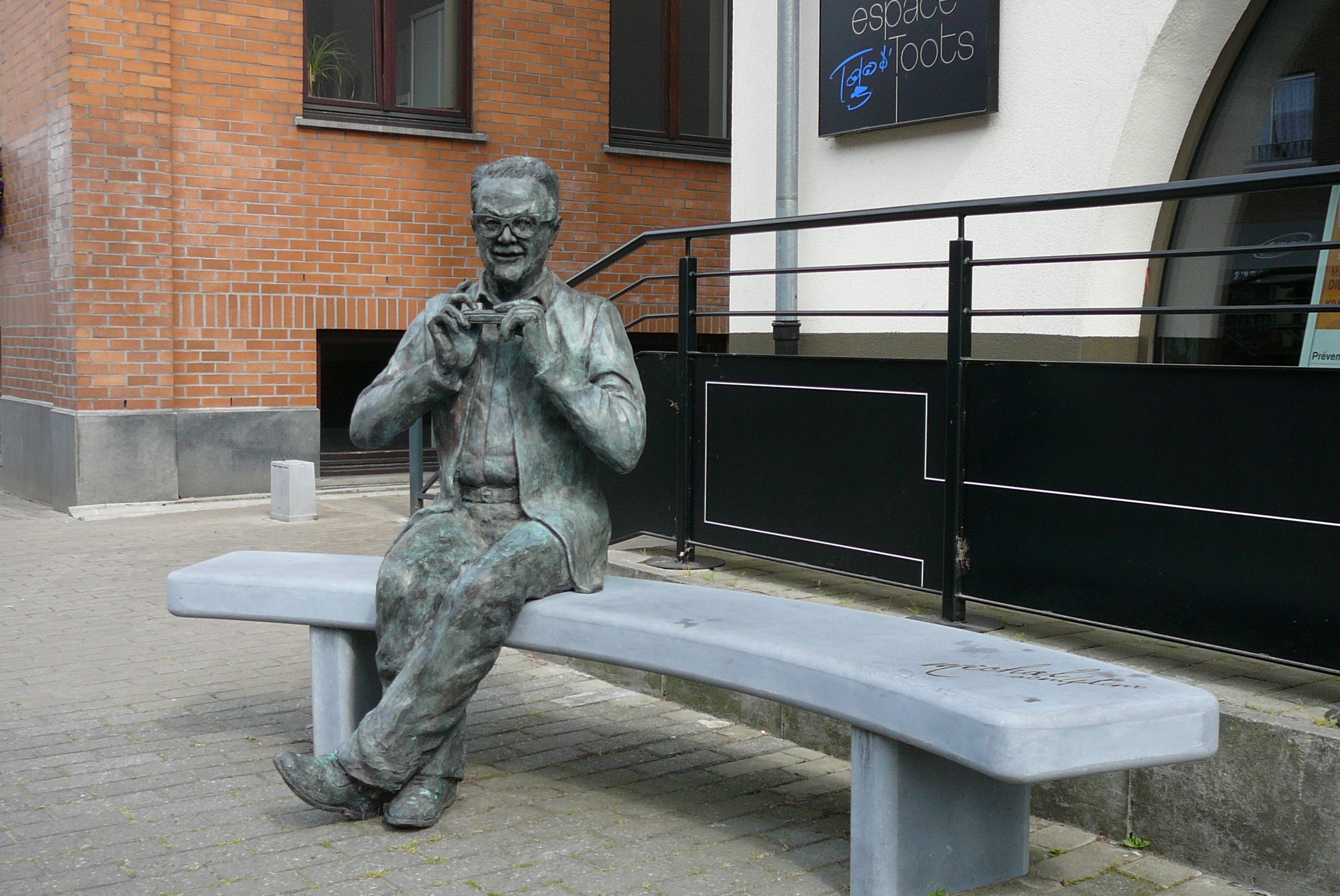
Thielemans' statue in La Hulpe

- 2 Hohner harmonica types, Toots Mellow Tone and Toots Hard Bopper
- A music studio, Studio Toots, was opened in Brussels in 1999
- The Toots Thielemans Jazz Awards in Brussels, from 2007
- Streets in Forrest, Brussels (Rue Toots Thielemans/Toots Thielemansstraat) and Middelburg (Toots Thielemansstraat)
- Schools in Brussels, E.F.A. A.R. Toots Thielemans, and Athénée Royal Toots Thielemans
- A Brussels metro station Toots Thielemans
- An asteroid, (13079) Toots
- A limited Belgian €20 silver coin was issued in 2017
- Statues in Lissewege (2011) and La Hulpe (2018)
- The Toots Sessies, music sessions by different artists organized by VRT from 2020
- On 29 April 2022, Google celebrated Toots Thielemans' 100th birthday with a Google Doodle

== Discography ==
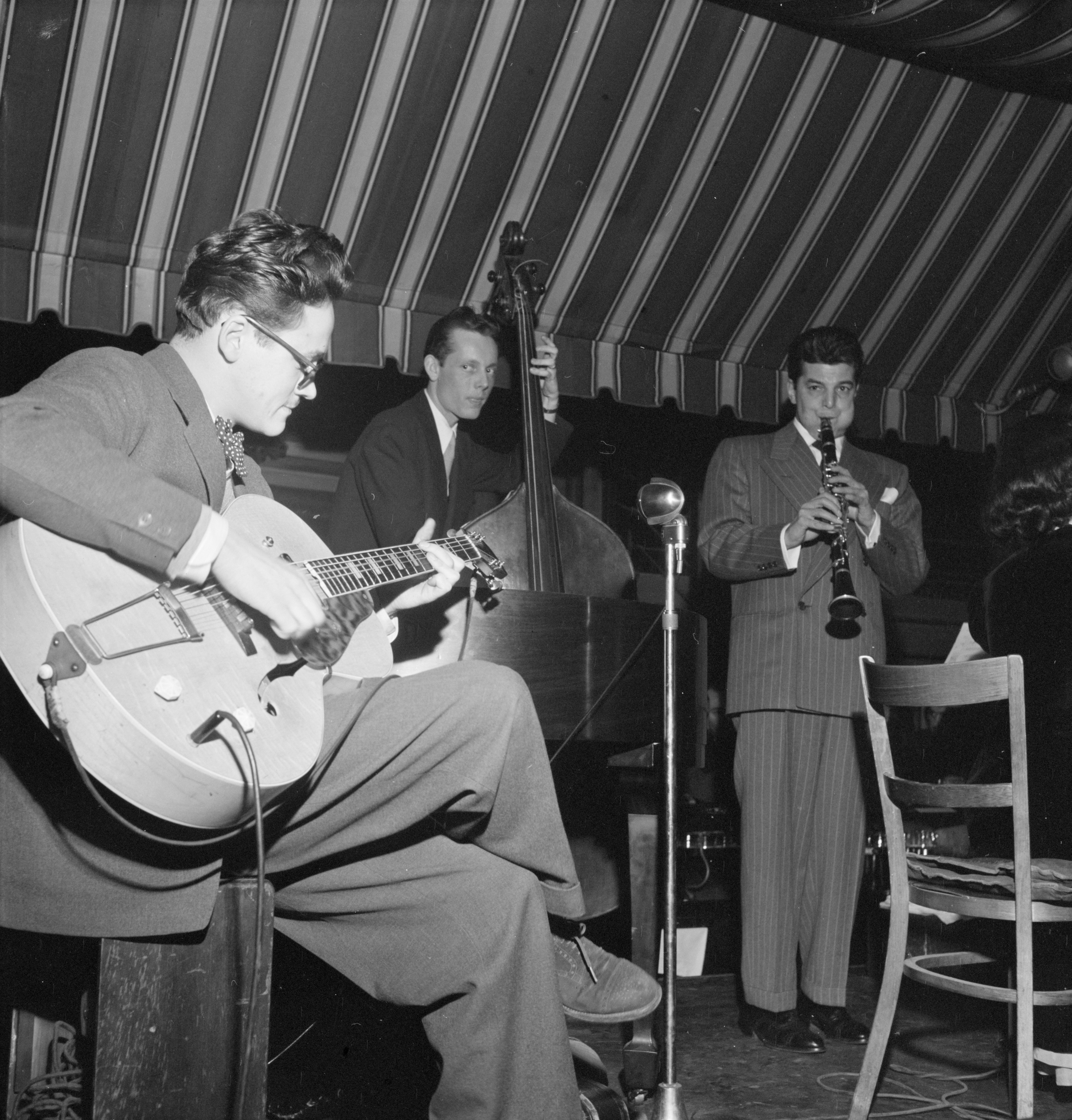
Toots Thielemans (left) and Joe Marsala (right), c. 1947

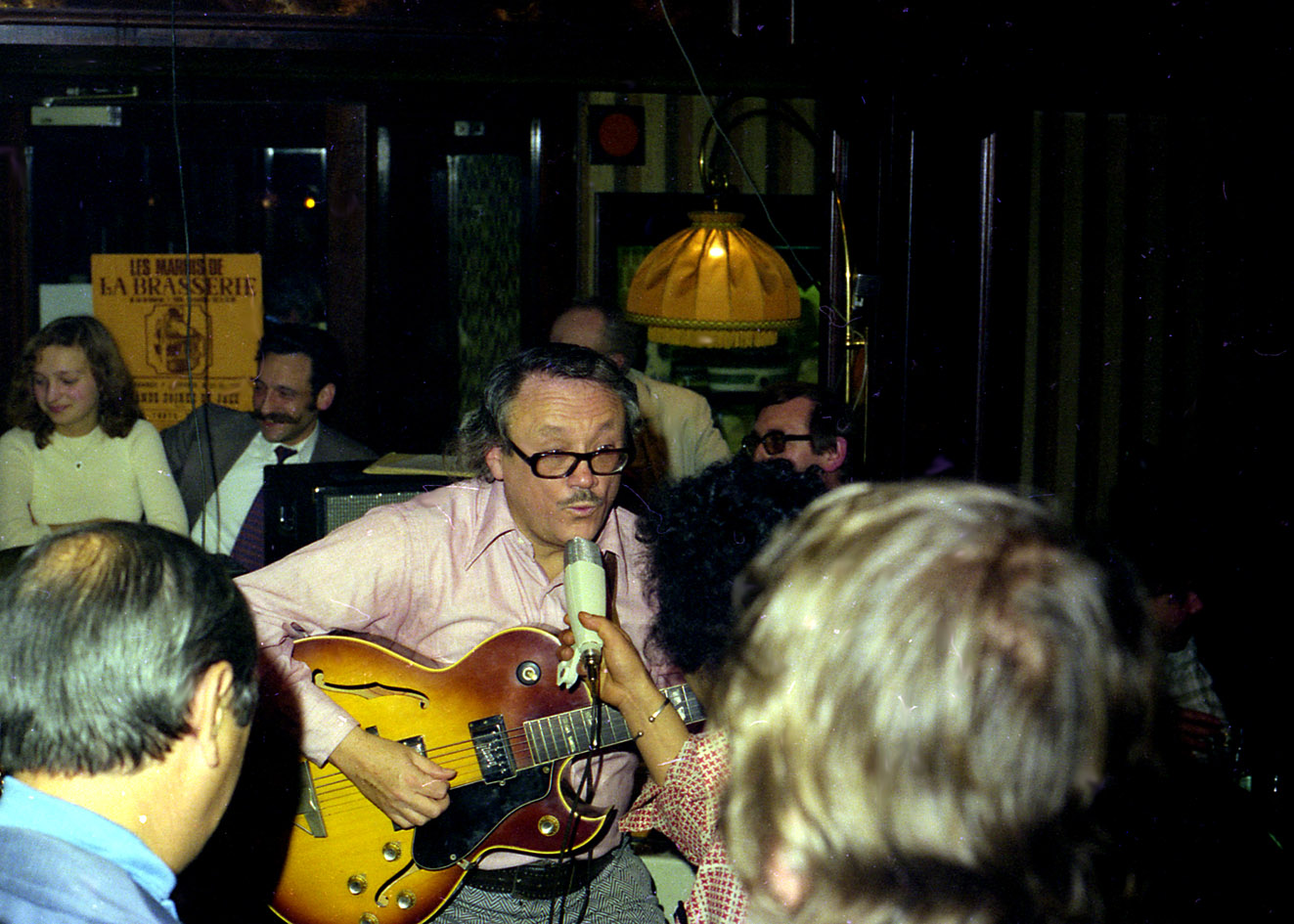
Thielemans at La Brasserie, 1975

=== As leader ===
- The Sound (Columbia, 1955)
- Man Bites Harmonica! (Riverside, 1958)
- Time Out for Toots (Decca, 1958)
- The Soul of Toots Thielemans with Ray Bryant (Signature, 1960)
- Blues for Flirter (aka Try a Little Tenderness) (Polydor, 1961)
- Road to Romance with Orchestra Directed by Kurt Edelhagen (Polydor, 1961)
- The Romantic Sounds of Toots Thielemans (MGM, 1962)
- Jazz Workshop Concert - Ruhrfestspiele 1962 with Friedrich Gulda, Herb Geller, Ack van Rooyen and Hans Koller (Columbia, 1962)
- Toots Thielemans (Columbia, 1963)
- The Whistler and His Guitar (ABC-Paramount, 1964)
- Too Much! Toots! (Philips, 1965)
- Contrasts (Command, 1966)
- Toots (Command, 1968)
- Toots on Tour (Philips, 1968)
- Honeysuckle Rose Aquarela Do Brasil (aka Elis & Toots) with Elis Regina (Phillips, 1969)
- Toots in Holland (Philips, 1970)
- A Taste of Toots (Philips, 1970)
- Yesterday and Today with Svend Asmussen (A&M, 1973)
- Captured Alive (Choice, 1974)
- Toots Thielemans/Philip Catherine & Friends (Keytone, 1974) [reissued with two bonus tracks as Two Generations (Limetree, 1996)]
- Old Friend (Polydor, 1974)
- Sweet & Lovely (ABC, 1975)
- Sherlock Jones Original Soundtrack (Polydor, 1974)
- Toots Möter Taube (Sonet, 1978)
- Höresund with Östen Warnerbring (Frituna Sweden, 1979)
- Johnny Larsen with C.V. Jørgensen (Metronome Denmark, 1979)
- When I See You with Bill Ramsey (Erus Technik Gmbh, 1980)
- Collage (CBS, 1980)
- Swing on Birdland Vol.4 with Yuzuru Sera (Canyon, 1980)
- The Guitar Session with Gene Bertoncini (Inner City, 1981)
- Slow Motion (Jazz Man, 1981)
- Toots & Louis with Louis Van Dijk (Polydor, 1982)
- Live (Inner City, 1982)
- Live 2 (Inner City, 1982)
- Live 3 (Inner City, 1982)
- Live in the Netherlands (Pablo, 1982)
- Steel Tenor Madness (HEP, 1982)
- Midnight Cruiser (Better Days Japan, 1983)
- Christian Escoudé Group feat. Toots Thielemans (JMS France, 1983)
- Harmonica Jazz (CBS, 1984)
- Bringing It Together with Stephane Grappelli (Cymekob, 1984)
- YaKsa (Original Motion Picture Soundtrack) with Masahiko Satoh & Yukihide Takekawa (Interface Japan, 1985)
- Chiko's Bar with Sivuca (Sonet, 1985)
- Your Precious Love (Sonet, 1985)
- Bande Originale Du Film Une Femme Ou Deux with Kevin Mulligan (Apache, 1985)
- Just Friends with Paul Kuhn (Delta, 1986)
- Check It Out with Mezzoforte (BBC Radioplay Music, 1986)
- Toots & Svend with Svend Asmussen (Sonet, 1987)
- Home Coming (CBS, 1987)
- Only Trust Your Heart (Concord Jazz, 1988)
- Romantic Gala (Dino Music, 1988)
- Rosinha De Valença-Flavio Faria with Rosinha De Valença (RGE, 1989)
- Toots Thielemans in Tokyo (Denon, 1989)
- Footprints (EmArcy, 1990)
- Spotlight (Sonet, 1990)
- Apple Dimple (Denon, 1990)
- For My Lady with the Shirley Horn Trio (EmArcy, 1991)
- Make Someone Happy with Mary Kay (Gam Jam, 1991)
- L'Or De L'Île Carn with Sirius (Keltia Musique, 1992)
- The Brasil Project (Private Music, 1992)
- Martial Solal Toots Thielemans with Martial Solal (Erato, 1992)
- The Brasil Project Volume 2 (Private Music, 1993)
- Calling Me Back Home with Randy Bernsen (101 South Records, 1993)
- Do Not Leave Me (Milan, 1994)
- East Coast West Coast (Private Music, 1994)
- Chez Toots (Private Music, 1998)
- Chet & Toots with Åke Johansson Trio and Chet Baker (Dragon, 1998)
- Accentuate the Positive with Joe Kennedy Jr. (CAP, 1998)
- The Live Takes Volume 1 (Narada, 2000)
- Toots Thielemans and Kenny Werner (Verve, 2001)
- This Heart Of Mine with Jackie Ryan and Ernie Watts (OpenArt, 2003)
- Lady Be Good with DR Big Band and Etta Cameron (Content, 2003)
- One More for the Road (Verve, 2006)
- European Quartet Live (Challenge Jazz, 2010)
- Live in Brussels with Tito Puente (Smith & Co, 2011)
- Toots 90 (Challenge Jazz, 2012)
- What a Wonderful World (Challenge Records, 2012)
- Airegin (Vinyl Passion, 2014)

=== As sideman ===
With John Denver

- Aerie (RCA, 1971)
- Farewell Andromeda (RCA, 1973)

With Eliane Elias

- Illusions (Denon, 1986)
- Bossa Nova Stories (Blue Note, 2008)

With Quincy Jones

- Quincy Jones Explores the Music of Henry Mancini (Mercury, 1964)
- The Pawnbroker (Mercury, 1964)
- Walk, Don't Run (Mainstream, 1966)
- Walking in Space (A&M, 1969)
- Gula Matari (A&M, 1970)
- Smackwater Jack (A&M, 1971)
- You've Got It Bad Girl (A&M, 1973)
- Mellow Madness (A&M, 1975)
- The Dude (A&M, 1981)
- Q's Jook Joint (Qwest, 1995)

With Peggy Lee

- Blues Cross Country (Capitol, 1962)
- Somethin' Groovy! (Capitol, 1967)

With Melanie

- Gather Me (Neighborhood, 1971)
- As I See It Now (Neighborhood, 1975)

With Oscar Peterson

- The Oscar Peterson Big 6 at Montreux (Pablo, 1975)
- Live at the North Sea Jazz Festival, 1980 (Pablo, 1980)

With George Shearing

- Shearing in Hi-Fi (MGM, 1955)
- The Shearing Spell (Capitol, 1955)
- Lullaby of Birdland (MGM, 1957)
- Latin Affair (Capitol, 1958)
- Jazz Conceptions (MGM, 1958)
- Latin Lace (Capitol, 1958)
- Beauty and the Beat! (Capitol, 1958)
- Rap Your Troubles in Drums (MGM, 1959)
- Shearing on Stage! (Capitol, 1959)
- On the Sunny Side of the Strip (Capitol, 1960)

With James Taylor

- A Christmas Album (Hallmark, 2004)
- James Taylor at Christmas (Columbia, 2006)

With others

- Jay Anderson, Local Color (DMP, 1994)
- Brook Benton, Brook Benton Today (Atlantic, 1970)
- Jay Berliner, Gene Bertoncini and Richard Resnicoff, The Guitar Session (Philips, 1977)
- The Brothers Johnson, Look Out for #1 (A&M, 1976)
- Philip Catherine, End of August (WEA, 1982)
- Ray Charles, A Message from the People (ABC, 1972)
- Natalie Cole, Stardust (Elektra, 1996)
- Rick Derringer, All American Boy (Blue Sky, 1973)
- Sheena Easton, No Sound But a Heart (EMI, 1987)
- Bill Evans, Affinity (Warner Bros. Records, 1979)
- Michael Franks, Passionfruit (Warner Bros., 1983)
- Richard Galliano, Laurita (Dreyfus, 1995)
- Dizzy Gillespie, Digital at Montreux, 1980 (Pablo, 1980)
- Lesley Gore, Love Me By Name (A&M, 1976)
- Urbie Green, The Fox (CTI, 1976)
- Henry Gross, Love Is the Stuff (Lifesong, 1978)
- Lena Horne, We'll Be Together Again (Blue Note, 1994)
- Shirley Horn, I Remember Miles (Verve, 1998)
- James Ingram, It's Real (Warner Bros., 1989)
- Billy Joel, An Innocent Man (Columbia, 1983)
- Fumio Karashima, Rencontre (Polydor, 1999)
- James Last, Theme from Der Landarzt (Polydor, 1987)
- Julian Lennon, Valotte (Atlantic, 1984)
- Joe Lovano, Flights of Fancy: Trio Fascination Edition Two (Blue Note, 2001)
- Naoya Matsuoka, Kaleidoscope (Warner Bros., 1979)
- Pat Metheny, Secret Story (Geffen, 1992)
- Laura Nyro, More Than a New Discovery (Verve, 1967)
- Sally Oldfield, Instincts (CBS, 1988)
- Jaco Pastorius, Word of Mouth (Warner Bros., 1981)
- Lionel Richie, Louder Than Words (Mercury, 1996)
- Diane Schuur, Love Songs (GRP, 1993)
- George Shearing and Dakota Staton, In the Night (Capitol, 1958)
- Paul Simon, Still Crazy After All These Years (Columbia, 1975)
- Frank Sinatra, The World We Knew (Reprise, 1967)
- Sivuca, Chiko's Bar (Sonet, 1985)
- Sarah Vaughan, Songs of The Beatles (Atlantic, 1981)
- Patrick Williams, Come On and Shine (MPS, 1978)
- Vanessa Williams, The Sweetest Days (Mercury, 1994)
- Aziza Mustafa Zadeh, Jazziza (Columbia, 1997)
