= The Dreams =

Faroese punk rock band

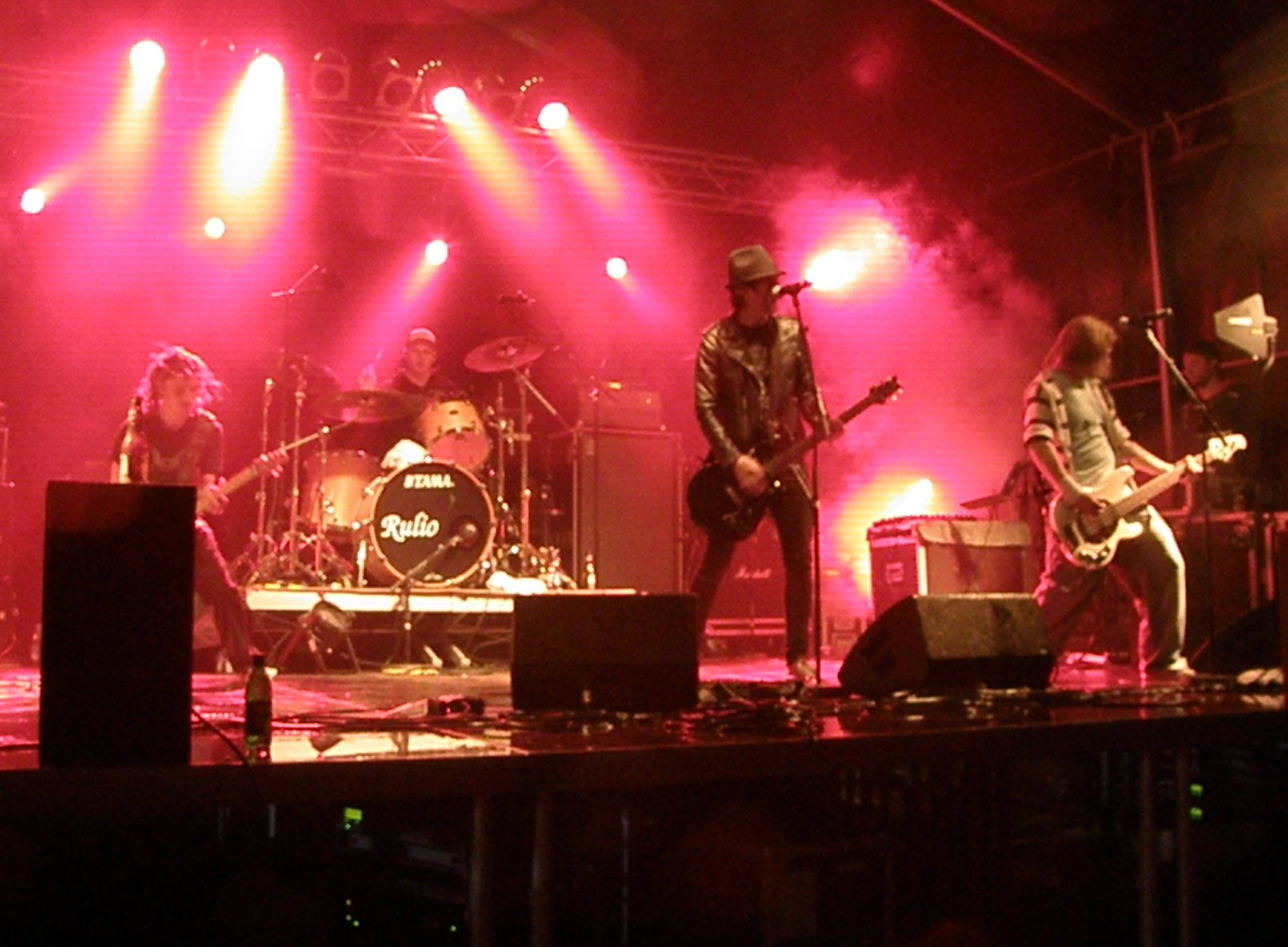

Background information
- Origin: Faroe Islands, Denmark
- Genres: Punk rock, pop punk
- Years active: 2006–2014
- Labels: Apache, Black Pelican
- Members: Hans Edward Andreasen; Heini Gilstón Corfitz Andersen; Eirikur Gilstón Corfitz Andersen; Heini Mortensen
- Website: www.the-dreams.eu

The Dreams was a punk rock band from Tórshavn, Faroe Islands formed in 2006.

They were based in Denmark along with their producer Lars Pedersen. They also have had success in the Faroe Islands, and all across Europe.

== Band history ==
=== Early years (2003–2005) ===
In 2003 in Tórshavn, friends Hans Edward Andreasen, Heini Mortensen, Heðin Egholm Skov and Edmund í Garði, formed a punk band called 'Zink'. Heðin left the band in 2004, to be replaced by Eirikur Gilstón Corfitz Andersen.

In the same year, they released an album called Totally Love Songs, which contained songs in both Faroese and English.

The band was active until late 2004, when Edmund í Garði decided to leave the band due to conflicting interests regarding the band's musical style. Hans Edward Andreasen, Heini Mortensen and Eirikur Gilstón Corfitz Andersen decided to continue the band under the name "The Dreams". In early 2005 Heini Mortensen moved to Denmark, where he attended Den Rytmiske Højskole i Vig. Later the same year Hans Edward Andreasen decided to seek a better future in music life and also moved to Denmark.

=== Formation and Tazy (2006–2007) ===
Between March and August 2006, Hans Edward, Eirikur and Heini travelled individually to Copenhagen, Denmark, in search of success.

One of their songs was submitted, and the band were selected from thousands of applicants, to participate in the program A cut on MTV Europe, so they travelled to London. The band finished in third place.

Between June and July 2006, The Dreams recorded the punk rock cover album Tazy, a compilation of popular Faroese songs; their most popular song "Sasasa" is on this album.

In November 2006, the band participated in the Global Battle of the Bands in Copenhagen, where they ended up third of 25 bands. Here met their future producer Lars Pedersen, who was one of the judges in the contest.

In 2007 Eirikur's young brother, Corfitz, joined the band. Previously, he had had a Faroese pop rock band called Paradox. He had also released an album called Falling In Love, with songs in English.

=== Den Nye By (2008–2009) ===
In February 2008, the band released their Danish debut album Den Nye By and first music video "La' mig være". In the same month competed in the Dansk Melodi Grand Prix, competition in which Danish bands compete to represent their country at Eurovision. With "La' mig være" they managed to reach fourth place. They were the first Faroese band to participate in this event. During 2008 the band managed to settle at the top of the lists, so also were interviewed several times, showed the "Dreamhouse" where they lived and give small concerts.

The 2009 was a year of concerts, then they released in March their live album Den Nye By 09/Sakin Live, The Dreams started their tour through all Denmark and the Faroe Islands.

In August the band announced their next music video for the previously announced new album. "Under The Sun" was released October 11, with a video that swept through the radio and television programs of Denmark.

In early December the band played in the "Dance 4 Climate Change", event held on the grounds of 2009 United Nations Climate Change Conference. Here they played three songs from their upcoming album Revolt.

Two days after Christmas the band performed their "Dreamer Xmas Event '09"; they were accompanied by Jesper Storgaard lead singer of the grunge Danish band Surfact. Together they covered Green Day songs.

The same day they released For Dreamers Only, a collection of several songs, both new and some old.

=== Revolt (2010–2014) ===
It was not until February 2010 that the band released their second album in English, Revolt, and the associated video Revolt. With this album, The Dreams plan to cross borders and not be limited to Denmark.

In June they released their third single The Optimist off the album Revolt. The last two singles "Head Down Tired" and "Trash Can Friend" were released in 2013 and in 2014. Corfitz and Eirikur informed the fans that they were no longer a part of The Dreams owing to their new found band "Raped in Reno". The Dreams played their final concert on September 5, 2014 at the Mittland Festival (Faroese music festival) in Copenhagen.

== Band members ==
- Hans Edward Andreasen - lead vocals, guitar (2006 – 2014)
- Heini Gilstón Corfitz Andersen - lead guitar, backing vocals (2007 – 2014)
- Eirikur Gilstón Corfitz Andersen - bass, backing vocals (2006 – 2014)
- Heini Mortensen - drums, percussion (2006 – 2014)

== Discography ==
- 2006 - Tazy
- 2006 - Promo 2006 EP
- 2008 - Den Nye By
- 2009 - Den Nye By 09/Sakin Live
- 2009 - For Dreamers Only
- 2010 - Revolt

Single	Chart (DEN)	Year	Album
La' mig være	1	2008	Den Nye By
Himlen Falder/Helvede Kalder	1	2008	Den Nye By
Backstabber	1	2008	Den Nye By
25 (Den Nye By prt.2)	-	2008	Den Nye By 09/Sakin Live
Ingen Kan Erstatte Dig	4	2009	Den Nye By 09/Sakin Live
Under The Sun	1	2009	Revolt
Revolt	1	2010	Revolt
The Optimist	-	2010	Revolt
