= Jan Persson =

Danish music photographer (1943–2018)

- Born: 22 July 1943
- Died: 15 November 2018 (aged 75)
- Occupation: Freelance photographer
- Spouse: MajBritt Persson
- Children: 3, including Julie
- Awards: Ben Webster Prize (2004)

Jan Persson (22 July 1943 – 15 November 2018) was a Danish freelance photographer who worked for Danish newspapers and magazines in and around Copenhagen.

Early on, he specialized in documenting the jazz scene, later also the visiting beat and rock musicians who visited Copenhagen during the 1960s and the 1970s. His works have been documented in a series of books and exhibitions (see bibliography and exhibitions) and his pictures are used on more than 1,000 album and CD covers.

== Career ==
Persson supplied photographs to Down Beat since 1962, Jazz Special (DK), Musica Jazz (IT), Melody Maker (UK) and Danish newspapers Politiken, Berlingske Tidende and Ekstra Bladet. His photographs were published by a number of magazines, reissue record companies, and documentary films on the history of both jazz and rock music. Persson's jazz and rock photographs feature American jazz greats Louis Armstrong and Miles Davis to rock icons Bob Dylan and Jimi Hendrix.

His photographic archives have been exhibited internationally. More than 15,000 pictures are now in the files of Aalborg University in Denmark.

=== Award ===
Persson received the Ben Webster Prize in March 2004.

== Death ==
Persson died in 2018 at age of 75 due to cancer in a hospice near Copenhagen. He was survived by his wife, MajBritt Persson, and three children from an earlier marriage, Christina Persson, Louise Persson, and Julie Lund.

== Bibliography ==
Jan Persson's books (primarily in Danish):

- Børge Roger Henrichsen; Jan Persson (1965). Af jazzens billedbog (in Danish). P. Fogtdal.
- Jan Persson (1996). Jazz Portraits (in Danish). Tiderne Skifter.
- Peter H. Larsen; Thorbjørn Sjøgren (2003). Politikens jazzleksikon : udenlandske og danske jazzbiografier (in Danish). Politikens Forlag. ISBN 978-87-567-6761-3.
- Finn Slumstrup Gyldendals bog om Jazz ("Gyldendal's Book on Jazz") (Gyldendal Publ. Coorp., 2003)
- Erik Moseholm Den Hemmelige Krystal ("The Secret Crystal")(elkjaeroghansen, 2003)
- Peter H. Larsen & Thorbjørn Sjøgren NHØP (Niels-Henning Ørsted Pedersen)(Gyldendal Publ. Company, 2005)
- Torben Bille & Jan Persson: Gas (Gasolin) (Gyldendal Publ. Company, 2006)
- Finn Slumstrup Jazz – En musikalske guide (Gyldendal, 2007)
- Torben Bille & Jan Persson Midt i en Beattid ("The World’s Greatest Rock Stars in Denmark 1964-74") (Gyldendal Publ. Company, 2008)
- Christian Munch-Hansen By af Jazz ("City of Jazz") (Thanning og Appel 2008)
- Frank Büchmann-Møller & Henrik Wolsgaard-Iversen Montmartre, Jazzhuset i St. Regnegade 19, København K (Jazzsign & Syddansk Universitetsforlag 2008)
- Tore Mortensen Fortællinger om Jazzen. ("Tellings of Jazz") (Aalborg Universitetsforlag 2010)
- Mia Fuglsang Holm (1 September 2011). Musical Portraits: Photographs and Reflections by Jan Persson. Publishing House Ajour. ISBN 978-87-92241-60-3.
- Olav Harsløf (2011). Jazz i Danmark 1950-2010 (in Danish). Politikens Forlag. ISBN 978-87-567-9565-4.

FURTHER REPRESENTED IN THE FOLLOWING PUBLICATIONS

- Lee Tanner The Jazz Image, Masters of Jazz Photography (Harry N. Abrams, New York 2006)
- Richard Williams Dylan, A Man Called Alias (Bloomsbury, London 1992)
- Richard Williams Miles Davis, The Man in the Green Shirt (Bloomsbury, London 1993)
- Richard Williams Jazz, A Photographic Documentary (Studio Editions Ltd., London 1994)
- Lee Tanner & Lee Hildebrand Images of the Blues (Freedman/Fairfax, New York 1998)
- Scatti Jazz: La Tradizion del nuova (Lucianno Vanni Editore, Milano 2003)

== Exhibitions ==
- Musikhuset Århus, Denmark,1990
- Govinda Gallery, Washington, USA ”Monks World", 1997
- The Jazz Gallery, New York, USA ”Images of Miles Davis", 1998
- North Sea Jazz Festival, Den Haag, Holland with Gorm Valentine & Jørgen Bo, 1999
- Travelling Exhibition in Spain with Gorm Valentin & Jørgen Bo, 2001
- Missouri History Museum, St.Louis USA. 24 fotos af Miles Davis, 2001
- Travelling Exhibition in Italy with Gorm Valentin & Nicola Fasano, 2003
- Studio Gallery, Los Angeles, USA, 2005
- The Jazz Bakery, Los Angeles, USA, 2005
- Copenhagen Central Library, Denmark, 2006
- Gladsaxe Main Library, Denmark, 2007
- Casa Bossi, Novara Jazzfestival, Italy, 2011

== Awards ==
- Ben Webster Prize, Denmark, 2004
- Jazzformidlerprisen (The Jazz Communicator Award), Denmark, 2009
- jazzahead! Skoda Award, Bremen, Germany, 2014.
