= Eirikur Gilstón Corfitz Andersen =

Faroese musician (born 1984)

Eirikur
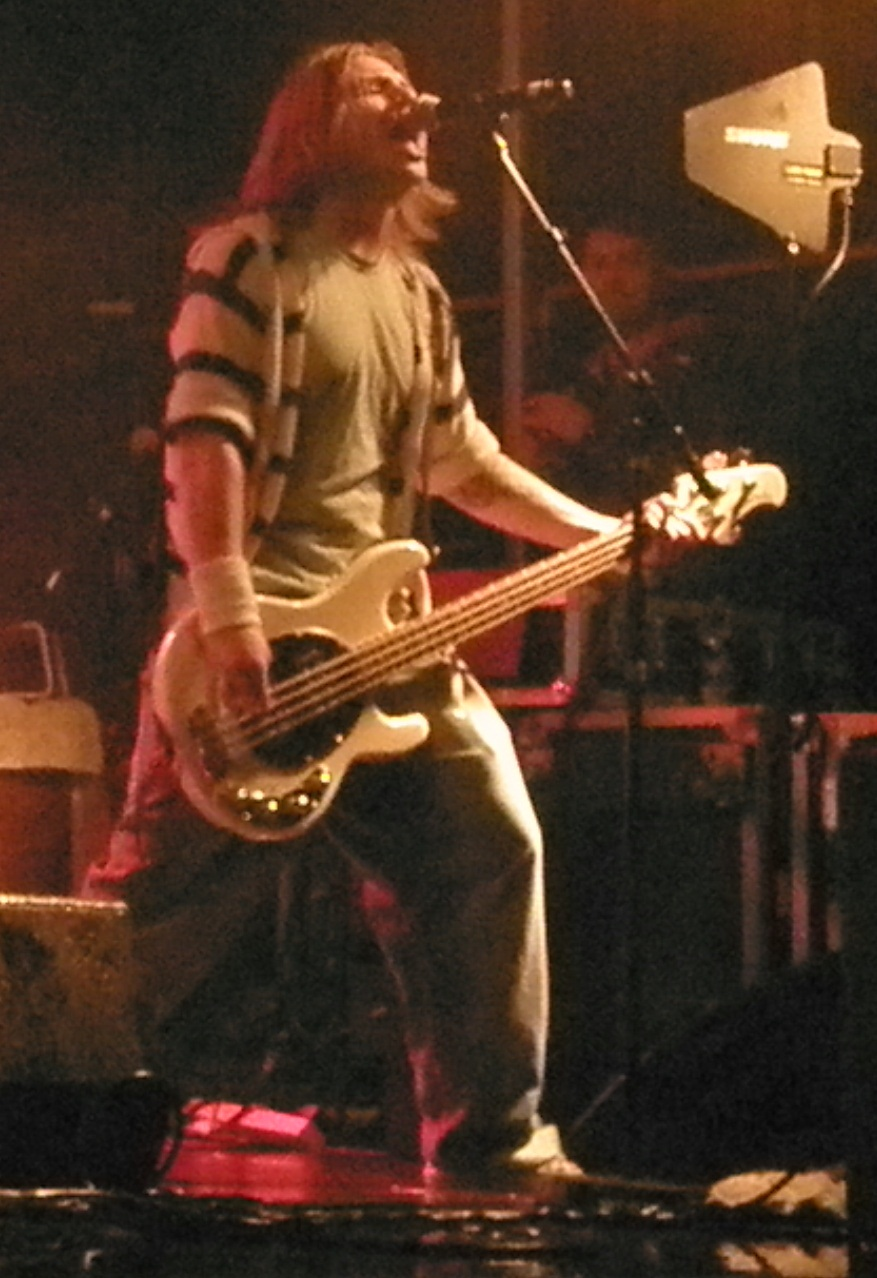

Background information
- Born: Eirikur Gilstón Corfitz Andersen; 16 December 1984 (age 41); Tórshavn, Faroe Islands
- Genres: Punk rock, Alternative rock, Pop punk
- Occupations: Musician, bassist, singer
- Instruments: Bass, vocals, guitar
- Years active: 2004–present
- Label: Black Pelican
- Formerly of: The Dreams, Zink

Eirikur Gilstón Corfitz Andersen (born 16 December 1984) is a Faroese musician, best known for his work as the bassist and backing vocalist of the alternative rock band The Dreams. He is the founder of the band along with Hans Edward Andreasen and Heini Mortensen.

== Early life with Zink ==
Eirikur was born in Tórshavn, Faroe Islands. Son of Birger Steen Corfitz Andersen and Malan Sigrun Olafsdóttir Gilstón Andersen. He has two brothers, Heini and Ólavur. His brother Heini is also a musician, they are now both members of The Dreams. Eirikur learned to play the bass when his brother Heini Corfitz Andersen already knew how to play the guitar, he also knows how to play the guitar. Eirikur worked in a nursery earlier.

Eirikur was the bassist in the former Faroese band "Zink" from 2004 to 2005. The band was established in 2003 with four band members: Hans Edward Andreasen, Heini Mortensen, Heðin Egholm Skov and Edmund í Garði. When Heðin left the band in 2004, Eirikur replaced him as bass player. Eirikur achieved success as did his brother with this band. Only he earned a little more money than Corfitz, so he could travel to Copenhagen. Always he was the funniest with Zink, band that disbanded in 2005, because he, Hans Edward Andreasen and Heini Mortensen decided to travel to Denmark.

== Professional career ==
Eirikur is a professional musician, he plays the bass with the band The Dreams. Earlier he played the bass with the band Zink.

Zink only released one album named "Totally Love Songs". And they were the first band ever on the Faroe Islands to record and release a pop-punk record in the Faroe Islands(2003).

After 'Zink' break up (2004) some of the members teamed up to a new band, which they later called "The Dreams". The new band had three band members in the beginning: Hans Edward Andreasen, Heini Mortensen and Eirikur Gilstón Corfitz Andersen. Eirikur's younger brother Heini Gilstón Corfitz Andersen joined the band in 2007.

In 2004, The Dreams entered a MTV reality music show called "MTV A Cut", and got the chance to win a support tour under Anastacia. The famous singer Anastacia was one of the judges in this competition, alongside Olivier Behzadi (A&R Sony). The Dreams were picked out of more than 4000 acts around the world to take part in this reality show. They ended up on third place on "MTV A Cut".

In 2006, The Dreams decided to "re"record old classic Faroese folk song, and turning all of the songs into Pop-Punk. The album Tazy was a great success on the Faroe Islands and won numerous awards, including "Album of the year" and "Hit of the year".

In late 2006, The Dreams moved from the Faroe Islands to Denmark. And end up working with the Danish producer "Chief 1".

In 2007, the band released their second album and this time it's in Danish. The album was named "Den nye by" which means "The New City". This album was also a success.

In 2008, The Dreams participated in the Danish Eurovision Dansk Melodi Grand Prix 2008 with the song "La' mig være", they became number 4. The band published their debut album in Denmark at the same time, the album is called "Den Nye By". They also released three singles that year from the album Den Nye By: "La' mig være", "Himlen Falder/Helvede Kalder" and "Backstabber". Backstabber was number one on the Danish Boogie List for 10 weeks.

In March 2009, the band released the album "Den Nye By 09/Sakin Live". In 2009 the band released the single "Under the Sun".

The song "Under the Sun" won the Faroese Planet Award 2009 for the Best Song of the Year.

In 2010, the band released the album "Revolt", which is in English.
