= Hans Andreasen =

Hans Andreasen may refer to:

- Hans Edward Andreasen (born 1983), Faroese musician
- Hans Henrik Andreasen (born 1979), Danish footballer
