= DQ (singer) =

Danish singer and drag queen

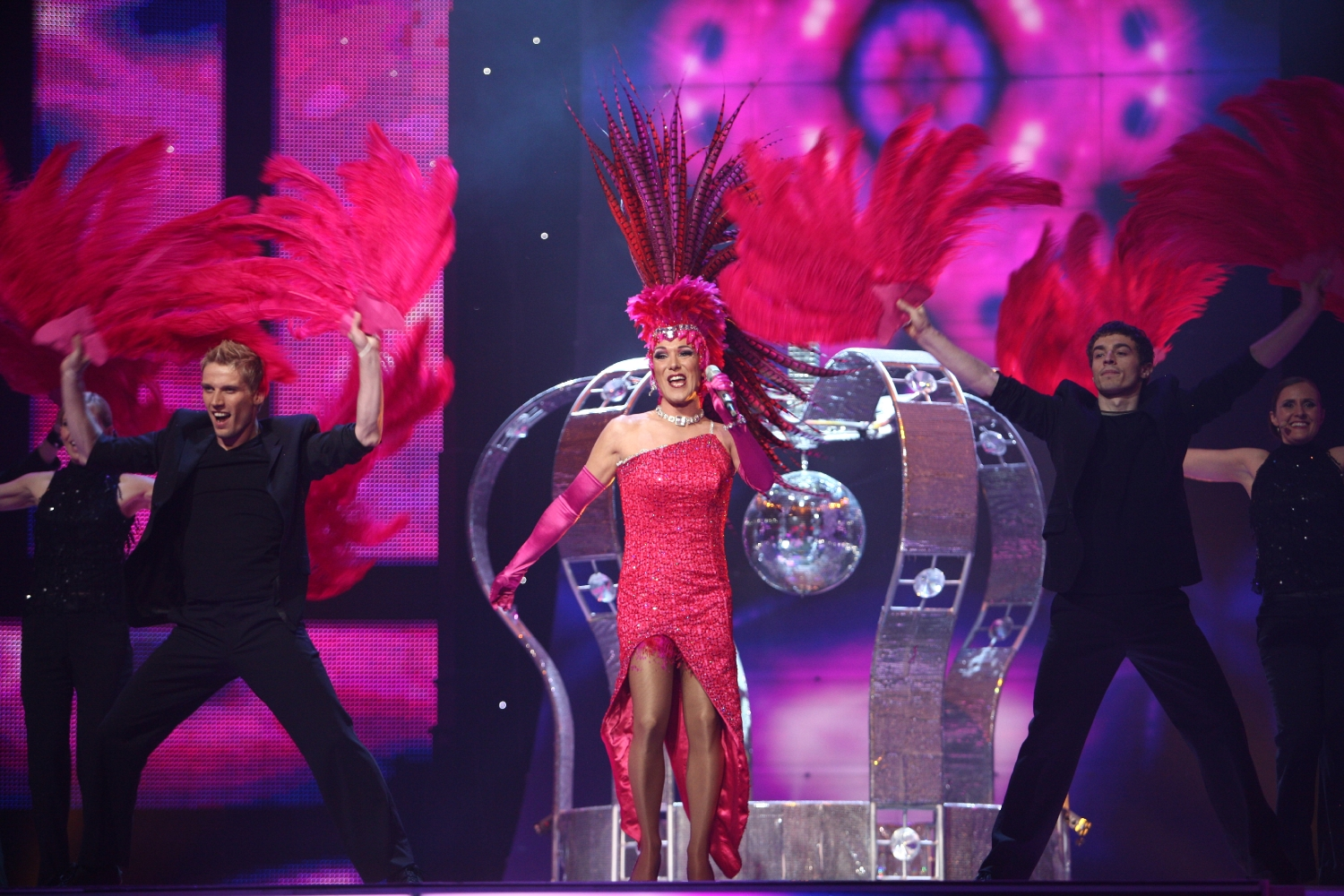
DQ at Eurovision 2007

DQ (born Peter Andersen on 16 February 1973 in Køge) is a Danish singer and drag queen who won the Danish Melodi Grand Prix 2007 and therefore represented Denmark in the Eurovision Song Contest 2007 with the song "Drama Queen". The song failed to qualify in the semi-final stage, placing 19th with 45 points.

== Notes ==
| Preceded by Sidsel Ben Semmane with Twist of Love | Denmark in the Eurovision Song Contest; 2007 | Succeeded by Simon Mathew with All Night Long |
