= Denmark in the Eurovision Song Contest 2007 =

- Eurovision Song Contest 2007
- Participating broadcaster: Danmarks Radio (DR)
- Country: Denmark
- Selection process: Dansk Melodi Grand Prix 2007
- Selection date: 10 February 2007

Competing entry
- Song: "Drama Queen"
- Artist: DQ
- Songwriters: Peter Andersen; Claus Christensen; Simon Munk

Placement
- Semi-final result: Failed to qualify (19th)

Participation chronology

Denmark was represented at the Eurovision Song Contest 2007 with the song "Drama Queen", written by Peter Andersen, Simon Munk, and Claus Christensen, and performed by Andersen under the drag stage persona DQ. The Danish participating broadcaster, Danmarks Radio (DR), organised the national final Dansk Melodi Grand Prix 2007 in order to select its entry for the contest. The national selection consisted of two televised semi-finals, a radio wildcard selection and a televised final. In the final, the winner was selected by regional televoting. "Drama Queen" performed by DQ was the winner after gaining the most votes.

Denmark competed in the semi-final of the Eurovision Song Contest which took place on 10 May 2007. Performing during the show in position 12, "Drama Queen" was not announced among the top 10 entries of the semi-final and therefore did not qualify to compete in the final. It was later revealed that Denmark placed nineteenth out of the 28 participating countries in the semi-final with 45 points.

== Background ==
Prior to the 2007 contest, Danmarks Radio (DR) had participated in the Eurovision Song Contest representing Denmark thirty-five times since its first entry in 1957. It had won the contest, to this point, on two occasions: in 1963 with the song "Dansevise" performed by Grethe and Jørgen Ingmann, and in 2000 with the song "Fly on the Wings of Love" performed by Olsen Brothers. In 2006, "Twist of Love" performed by Sidsel Ben Semmane placed eighteenth in the final.

As part of its duties as participating broadcaster, DR organises the selection of its entry in the Eurovision Song Contest and broadcasts the event in the country. The broadcaster confirmed its intentions to participate at the 2007 contest on 7 June 2006. DR has selected all of its Eurovision entries through the national final Dansk Melodi Grand Prix. Along with their participation confirmation, the broadcaster announced that Dansk Melodi Grand Prix 2007 would be organised in order to select its entry for the 2007 contest.

== Before Eurovision ==
=== Dansk Melodi Grand Prix 2007 ===
Dansk Melodi Grand Prix 2007 was the 37th edition of Dansk Melodi Grand Prix, the music competition organised by DR to select its entries for the Eurovision Song Contest. The event included two semi-finals held on 26 January 2007 and 2 February 2007, followed by a radio wildcard selection between 5 and 8 February 2007, and a final held on 10 February 2007. All shows in the competition were hosted by Camilla Ottesen and Adam Duvå Hall and televised on DR1 as well as streamed online at the official DR website.

==== Format ====
Sixteen songs competed in the competition which consisted of two semi-finals and a final. Eight songs competed in each semi-final and the top four as determined exclusively by a public televote qualified to the final. Two wildcard selections featuring four of the remaining eight non-qualifying songs each were then held via radio on the stations DR P3 and DR P4, and listeners via televoting selected one song from each selection to qualify to the final. The winner in the final was determined again exclusively by a public televote. Viewers were able to vote via telephone or SMS during the televised shows, while voting in the wildcard selection was conducted via SMS.

==== Competing entries ====
DR opened a submission period between 25 August 2006 and 2 October 2006 for composers to submit their entries. All composers and lyricists were required to be Danish citizens or have a strong connection to Denmark. The broadcaster received 475 entries during the submission period. A selection committee selected sixteen songs from the entries submitted to the broadcaster, while the artists of the selected entries were chosen by DR in consultation with their composers. DR held a press meet and greet at the DR Byen in Copenhagen on 7 December 2006 where the competing artists and songs were announced and officially presented. Among the artists was Aud Wilken (who represented Denmark in 1995), and Jørgen Olsen (who won Eurovision for Denmark in 2000 as part of the Olsen Brothers).

Artist	Song	Songwriter(s)
Annette Heick	"Copenhagen Airport"	Annette Heick, Mogens Binderup
Annika Askman	"Fly"	Mads Haugaard, Annika Askman, Boe Larsen
Aud Wilken	"Husker du"	Mette Mathiesen, Lise Cabble
Cammille feat. DJ Mary	"It Ain't for the Money"	Jascha Richter, Rune Braager, Casper Lindstad
Christoffer Brodersen	"Paparazzi"	Ivar Lind Greiner
Danni Elmo	"Meaning of Life"	Thomas Edinger
Dariana and Olau	"Flammer indeni"	Niels Harboe Wissum, Carsten Henriksen, Lis Grandt
DQ	"Drama Queen"	Peter Andersen, Simon Munk, Claus Christensen
Heidi Degn	"On Top of the World"	Lasse Lindorff, Lars Halvor Jensen
Jacob Andersen	"Listen to Love"	Thomas Reil, Jeppe Reil, Morgen Reil
James Sampson	"Say You Love Me"	Claus Storgaard, Mogens Binderup
Jørgen Olsen	"Vi elsker bare danske piger"	Jørgen Olsen
Julie Lund	"Merhaba"	Carsten Falkenlind, Dorthe Kruuse
Katrine Falkenberg	"It's a Beautiful Day"	Jorn Hansen
Me and My	"Two Are Stronger than One"	Jascha Richter, Rune Braager, Casper Lindstad
Stig Rossen	"Så nær som nu"	Ivar Lind Greiner

==== Semi-finals ====
The two semi-finals took place on 26 January and 2 February 2007 at the Musikteatret in Holstebro and the Aalborghallen in Aalborg, respectively. The top four of each semi-final advanced to the final based on a public televote. In addition to the performances of the competing entries, Flaskedrengene and Simone performed as the interval acts during the first semi-final, while Michel Lauziére performed as the interval act during the second semi-final.

Semi-final 1 – 26 January 2007
R/O	Artist	Song	Result
1	Christoffer Brodersen	"Paparazzi"	Wildcard
2	Jacob Andersen	"Listen to Love"	Qualified
3	Dariana and Olau	"Flammer indeni"	Wildcard
4	Annette Heick	"Copenhagen Airport"	Qualified
5	Danni Elmo	"Meaning of Life"	Qualified
6	Heidi Degn	"On Top of the World"	Wildcard
7	Annika Askman	"Fly"	Qualified
8	Cammille feat. DJ Mary	"It Ain't for the Money"	Wildcard

Semi-final 2 – 2 February 2007
R/O	Artist	Song	Result
1	DQ	"Drama Queen"	Wildcard
2	Aud Wilken	"Husker du"	Wildcard
3	Jørgen Olsen	"Vi elsker bare danske piger"	Wildcard
4	Julie Lund	"Merhaba"	Wildcard
5	Stig Rossen	"Så nær som nu"	Qualified
6	Katrine Falkenberg	"It's a Beautiful Day"	Qualified
7	James Sampson	"Say You Love Me"	Qualified
8	Me and My	"Two Are Stronger than One"	Qualified

==== Wildcard selection ====
Listeners of DR P3 and DR P4 were able to vote for the songs competing in their respective groups between 5 and 8 February 2007. The song with the most votes in each group that advanced to the final were announced on 8 February 2007 during the radio programmes Go' Morgen P3 and Formiddag på P4'eren.

P3 wildcard selection – 5–8 February 2007
R/O	Artist	Song	Televote	Place	Result
1	Cammille feat. DJ Mary	"It Ain't for the Money"	11%	3	—N/a
2	Aud Wilken	"Husker du"	18%	2	—N/a
3	Julie Lund	"Merhaba"	11%	3	—N/a
4	DQ	"Drama Queen"	60%	1	Qualified

P4 wildcard selection – 5–8 February 2007
R/O	Artist	Song	Televote	Place	Result
1	Jørgen Olsen	"Vi elsker bare danske piger"	47%	1	Qualified
2	Christoffer Brodersen	"Paparazzi"	22%	2	—N/a
3	Dariana and Olau	"Flammer indeni"	12%	4	—N/a
4	Heidi Degn	"On Top of the World"	18%	3	—N/a

==== Final ====
The final took place on 10 February 2007 at the Forum Horsens in Horsens. The running order was determined by DR and announced on 5 February 2007. The winner, "Drama Queen" performed by DQ, was selected solely by a public televote. The voting results of each of Denmark's five regions were converted to points which were distributed as follows: 4, 6, 8, 10 and 12 points. In addition to the performances of the competing entries, DK Rocks, Gordon Kennedy, Master Fatman and Take That performed as the interval acts.

Final – 10 February 2007
R/O	Artist	Song	Televoting Regions					Total	Place
R/O	Artist	Song	Northern Denmark	Central Denmark	Southern Denmark	Zealand	Capital Region	Total	Place
1	Annette Heick	"Copenhagen Airport"						0	7
2	Me and My	"Two Are Stronger than One"	4		4			8	6
3	Annika Askman	"Fly"						0	7
4	Katrine Falkenberg	"It's a Beautiful Day"	6	6	6	6	6	30	4
5	Jacob Andersen	"Listen to Love"		4		4	4	12	5
6	Jørgen Olsen	"Vi elsker bare danske piger"						0	7
7	Danni Elmo	"Meaning of Life"						0	7
8	Stig Rossen	"Så nær som nu"	10	8	8	8	8	42	3
9	James Sampson	"Say You Love Me"	8	12	12	10	10	52	2
10	DQ	"Drama Queen"	12	10	10	12	12	56	1

==== Ratings ====
Viewing figures by show
Show	Date	Viewers (in millions)	Ref.
Semi-final 1	26 January 2007	1.006	
Semi-final 2	2 February 2007	1.077	
Final	10 February 2007	1.492	

== At Eurovision ==
According to Eurovision rules, all nations with the exceptions of the host country, the "Big Four" (France, Germany, Spain and the United Kingdom) and the ten highest placed finishers in the 2006 contest are required to qualify from the semi-final on 10 May 2007 in order to compete for the final on 12 May 2007. On 12 March 2007, a special allocation draw was held which determined the running order for the semi-final and Denmark was set to perform in position 12, following the entry from Albania and before the entry from Croatia.

The semi-final and final were broadcast on DR1 with commentary by Søren Nystrøm Rasted and Adam Duvå Hall. DR appointed Susanne Georgi as its spokesperson to announce the Danish votes during the final.

=== Semi-final ===
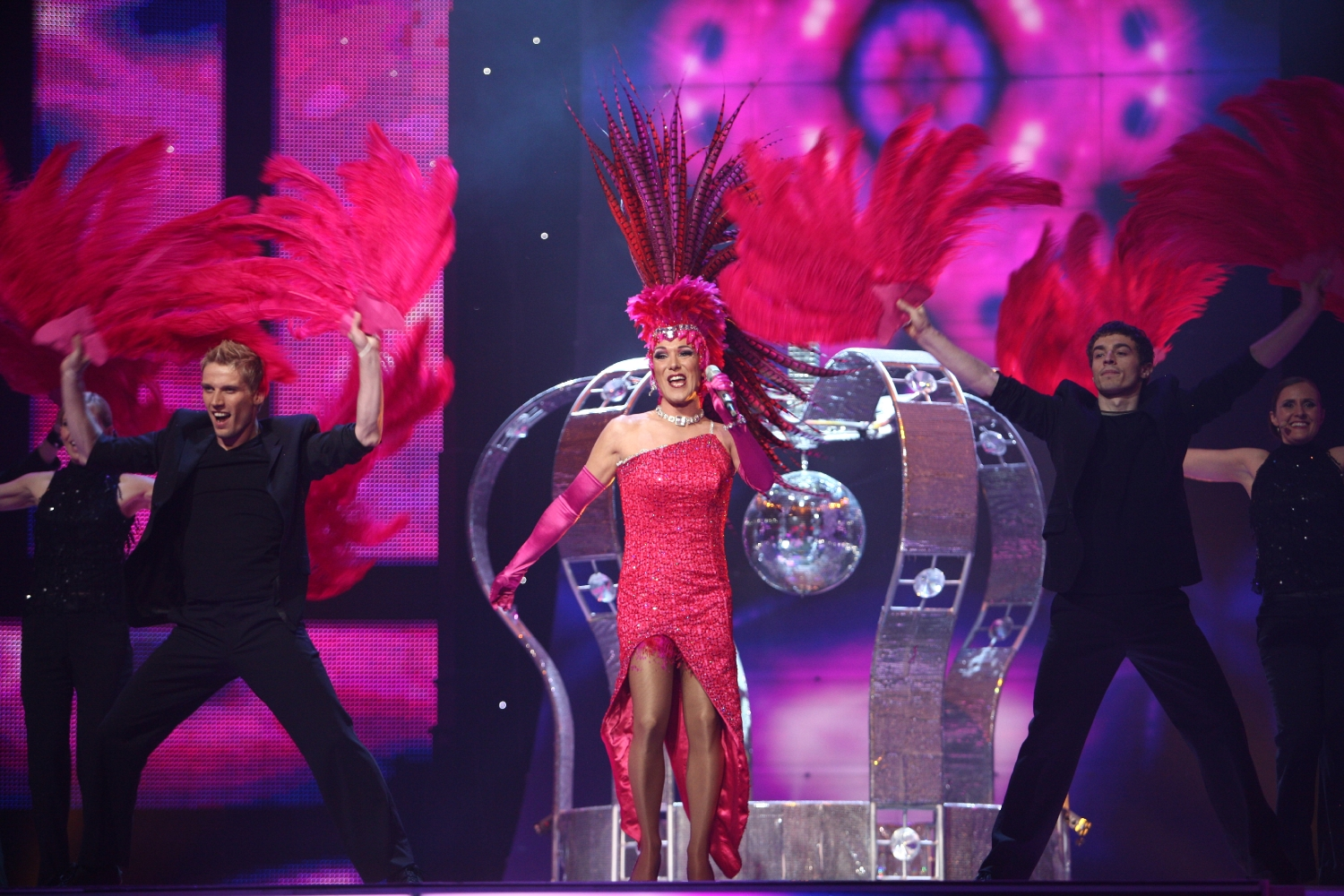
DQ during a rehearsal before the semi-final

DQ took part in technical rehearsals on 3 and 5 May, followed by dress rehearsals on 11 and 12 May. The Danish performance featured DQ wearing a headdress made from pink feathers and dressed in a black coat with silver sequins which was later removed to reveal a pink dress made of sequins underneath. DQ performed a choreographed routine with three backing vocalists and two dancers with the backing performers using pink feathers as part of the choreography. The LED screens displayed purple, pink and blue colours and pyrotechnic effects were used throughout the performance. The backing performers that joined DQ were: Christina Birksø, Christina Boelskifte, Claus Storgaard, David Boyd and René Winther.

At the end of the show, Denmark was not announced among the top 10 entries in the semi-final and therefore failed to qualify to compete in the final. It was later revealed that Denmark placed nineteenth in the semi-final, receiving a total of 45 points. The semi-final of the contest was watched by a total of 685 thousand viewers in Denmark.

=== Voting ===
Below is a breakdown of points awarded to Denmark and awarded by Denmark in the semi-final and grand final of the contest. The nation awarded its 12 points to Hungary in the semi-final and to Sweden in the final of the contest.

==== Points awarded to Denmark ====
Points awarded to Denmark (Semi-final)
Score	Country
12 points	
10 points	
8 points	Iceland
7 points	United Kingdom
6 points	Malta
5 points	Ireland; Israel
4 points	Norway; Sweden
3 points	Serbia
2 points	Andorra
1 point	Netherlands

==== Points awarded by Denmark ====
Points awarded by Denmark (Semi-final)
Score	Country
12 points	Hungary
10 points	Iceland
8 points	Turkey
7 points	Norway
6 points	Serbia
5 points	Latvia
4 points	Netherlands
3 points	Switzerland
2 points	Poland
1 point	Belarus

Points awarded by Denmark (Final)
Score	Country
12 points	Sweden
10 points	Turkey
8 points	Hungary
7 points	Bosnia and Herzegovina
6 points	Serbia
5 points	Germany
4 points	Finland
3 points	Ukraine
2 points	Russia
1 point	Greece
