= Elis & Toots =

Studio album by Elis Regina and Toots Thielemans
- Released: 1969
- Recorded: 8–9 February 1969
- Genre: Bossa nova
- Label: Philips
- Producer: Göte Wilhelmson

Elis & Toots is a 1969 bossa nova album by Brazilian singer Elis Regina and Belgian jazz musician Toots Thielemans recorded at a studio in Sweden and released on Philips Records. It features Toots Thielemans on harmonica, whistling and vocalizing playing guitar alongside. Thielemans and Elis Regina are actually heard on just four songs together, they both sit out on four of the twelve tracks. The accompanying quintet throughout comprises pianist Antônio Adolfo, Roberto Menescal, guitarist and the composer of four songs on the album, bassist Jurandir Duarte, Wilson das Neves on drums and Hermes Contesini on percussion. On three tracks Claes Rosendahl wrote arrangements for an additional string section.

Like Elis Regina's following album In London, recorded three months later, it was produced for the European market and released only there. In Brazil the album was not released until 1978 (through Philips' parent label PolyGram on Elenco and Fontana), under their full names, Elis Regina e Toots Thielemans, and titled Honeysuckle Rose / Aquarela do Brasil (as was a subsequent release in 1983 again on Philips). The first digitally release on CD was issued in 1998 as Aquarela do Brasil.

== Track listing ==
Side A

1. "Wave" (Antônio Carlos Jobim) 3:10
2. "Aquarela do Brasil" (Ary Barroso) 3:05
3. "Visão" (Antônio Adolfo, Tiberio Gaspar) 2:55
4. "Corrida de Jangada" (Edu Lobo, José Carlos Capinan) 2:05
5. "Wilsamba" (Roberto Menescal) 2:10
6. "Você" (Menescal, Ronaldo Bôscoli) 2:25

Side B

1. "Barquinho" (Menescal, Bôscoli) 2:25
2. "O Sonho" (Egberto Gismonti) 2:15
3. "Five for Elis" (Toots Thielemans) 1:55
4. "Canto de Ossanha" (Baden Powell, Vinícius de Moraes) 3:15
5. Honeysuckle Rose (Fats Waller) 2:50
6. "A Volta" (Menescal, Bôscoli) 4:30

Recorded on February 8–9, 1969 at Europafilm studio, Stockholm, Sweden.

== Personnel ==
- Elis Regina - vocals (except A3, 5, B3, 5)
- Toots Thielemans - harmonica (A1, 3, 5, B1, 6), guitar (A5, 6, B3, 5), whistling (A5, 6, B3), vocalizing (B5)
- Antônio Adolfo - piano
- Roberto Menescal - guitar
- Jurandir Duarte - bass
- Wilson das Neves - drums
- Hermes Contesini - percussion
- Claes Rosendahl - string arrangements (A3, B3, 6)

Production

- Göte Wilhelmson - producer
- Björn Almstedt and Gert Palmcrantz - recording engineers
- Oscar Hedlund - liner notes
