= Ingen Kan Erstatte Dig =

Single by The Dreams

from the album Den Nye By 09/Sakin Live
- Released: February 2009
- Genre: Pop punk Alternative rock
- Length: 4:14
- Label: Warner Bros.
- Songwriter: The Dreams
- Producer: Chief 1

The Dreams singles chronology
"25 (Den Nye By prt.2)" (2009)	"Ingen Kan Erstatte Dig" (2009)	"Under the Sun" (2009)

"Ingen Kan Erstatte Dig" is the second single from the album Den Nye By 09/Sakin Live, the single was released in February 2009. The song was not a big hit like La' Mig Være, Himlen Falder/Helvede Kalder and Backstabber. And get charted at number 4 at the boogie chart. The song features only Danish lyrics.

== Music video ==
The music video is a live performance by The Dreams, at The Summer Festival at the Faroe Islands.

== Track listing ==
1. "Ingen kan erstatte dig" – 4:14
2. "Ingen kan erstatte dig (Live)" – 4:58

== Chart ==
The single was only charted at the Danish Boogie chart.

Chart	Peak position
Danish Boogie Chart	4
