= Stig Rossen =

Danish singer and actor (born 1962)

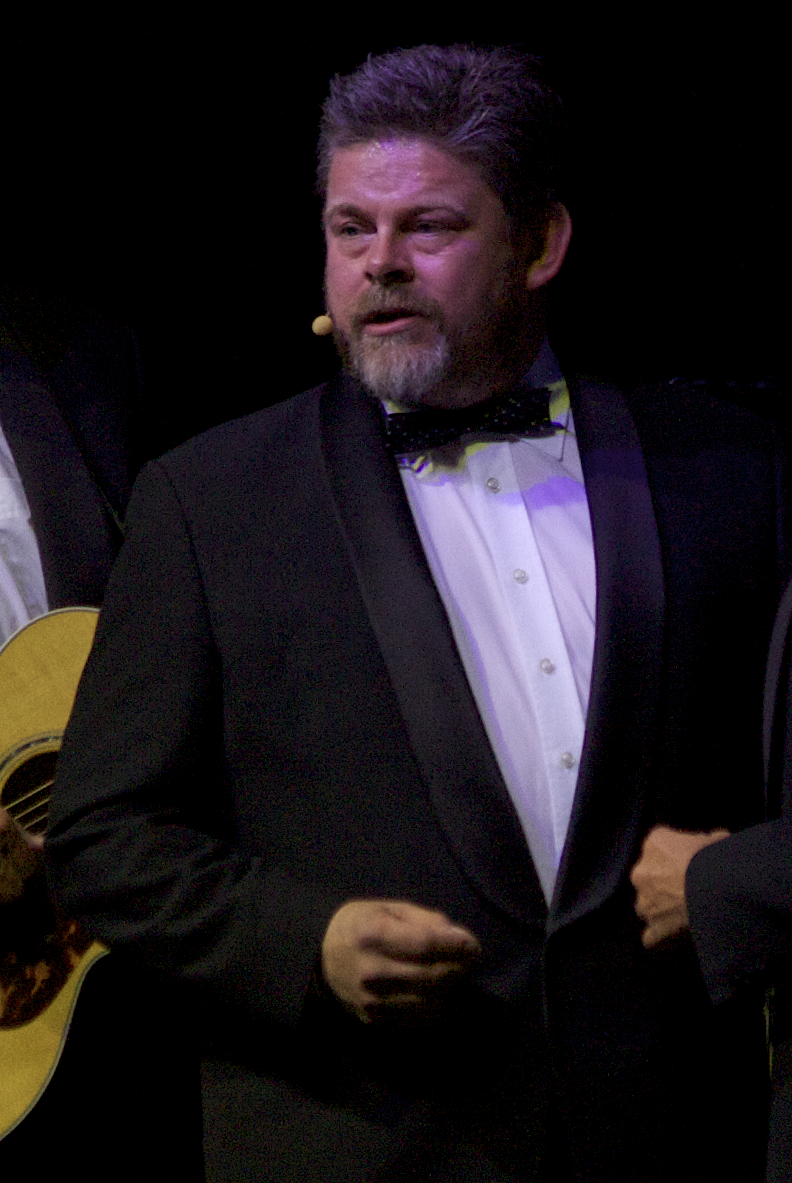
Rossen in 2009

Stig Rossen (born 14 June 1962) is a Danish singer and actor. He is known for his roles in musicals, especially playing Valjean in Les Misérables. He has also participated in Melodi Grand Prix, the Danish prelude to the Eurovision Song Contest. Rossen is known in Denmark for his Disney voice overs.
