= Hans Edward Andreasen =

Faroese musician (born 1983)

Hans Edward
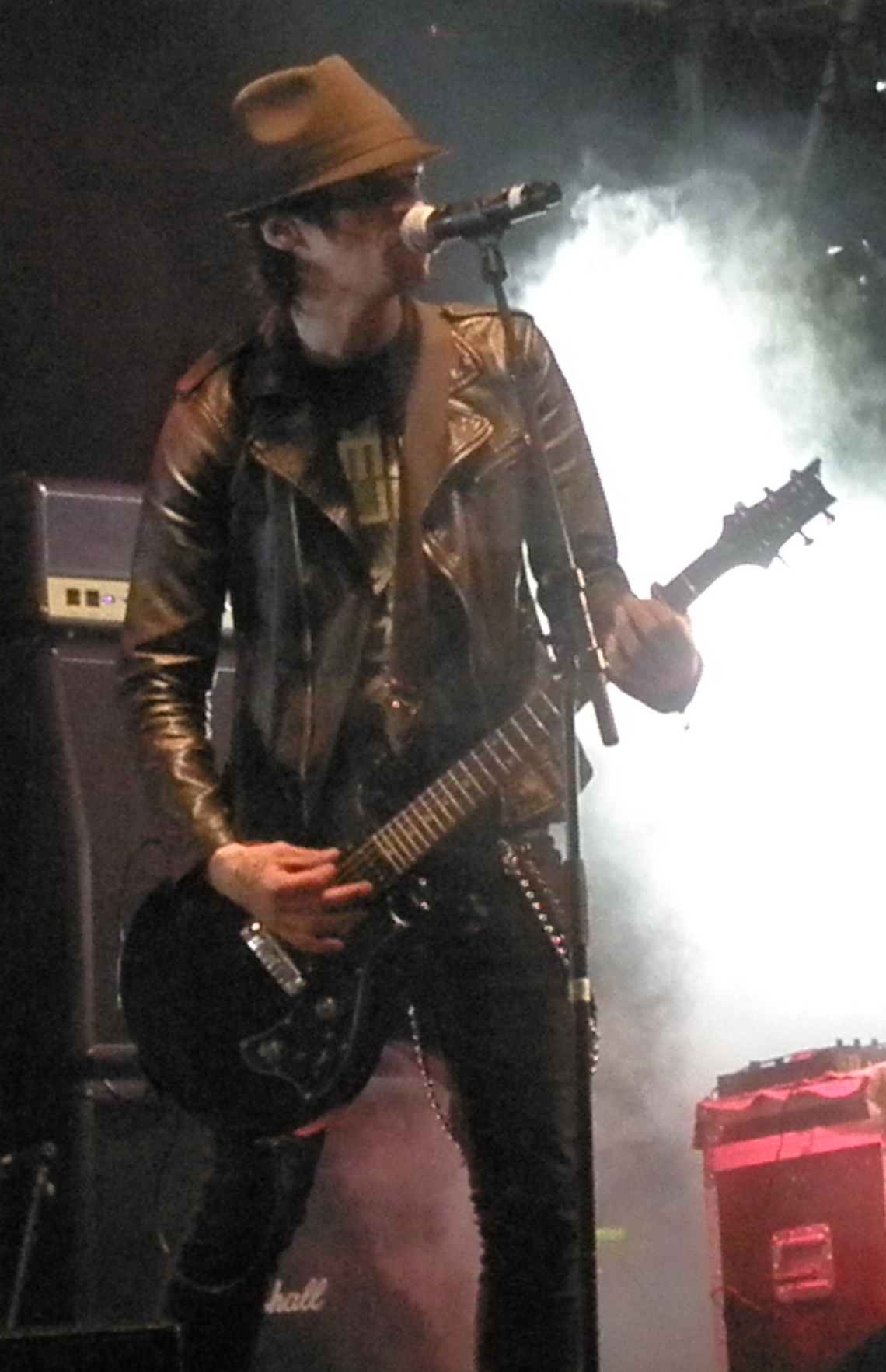

Background information
- Born: Hans Edward Andreasen; 12 November 1983 (age 42); Tórshavn, Faroe Islands
- Genres: Punk, alternative rock, pop punk
- Occupations: Musician singer Guitarist songwriter
- Instruments: Vocals, guitar, bass
- Years active: 2003 – present
- Labels: Black Pelican; Warner Bros. Records

Hans Edward Andreasen (born 12 November 1983) is a Faroese musician, best known for his work as the guitarist and lead vocalist of the alternative rock band The Dreams. He is the founder of the band along with Eirikur Gilstón Corfitz Andersen and Heini Mortensen. He is currently the lead guitarist and vocalist for Swardi.

== Early life ==
Hans Edward was born in Tórshavn, Faroe Islands. He dropped out of school when he was 16. He started working as an apprentice baker and finished training as a baker when he was only 20 years old even though he hated that job and had a passion for music. He used all of his free time in his own little home recording studio, composing and recording demos.

== Professional career ==
Zink only released one album named Totally Love Songs. And they were the first band ever on the Faroe Islands to record and release a pop-punk record (2003).

After the Zink band broke up in 2004 Hans Edward teamed up with Heini Mortensen, Eirikur Gilstón Corfitz Andersen and Eirikur's little brother Heini Gilstón Corfitz Andersen and started the band "The Dreams".

In 2004 "The Dreams" entered a MTV reality music show called "MTV A cut", and got the chance to win a support tour with singer Anastacia, who was of the judges in this competition, along with Olivier Behzadi (A&R Sony). "The Dreams" were picked out of more than 4000 acts around the world to take part in this reality show. They ended up in third place.

In 2006 The Dreams decided to re-record old classic Faroese folk songs, and turning all of the songs into Pop-Punk. The album was a great success on the Faroe Islands and won numerous awards, including "Album of the Year" and "Hit of the Year". During this time Andreasen also fronted a band called Sweet Junkies.

In the late 2006 "The Dreams" moved from the Faroe Islands to Denmark and ended up working with the Danish producer "Chief 1". In 2007 the band released their second album, Den Nye By ("The New City"), this time in Danish. This album was also a success.

In 2008 "The Dreams" participated in the Danish Eurovision Dansk Melodi Grand Prix 2008 with the song "La' mig være", and came fourth. The band released their debut album in Denmark at the same time, called Den Nye By. They also released three singles that year from the album: "La' mig være", "Himlen Falder/Helvede Kalder" and "Backstabber".

In March 2009 the band released the album "Den Nye By 09/Sakin Live". In 2009 the band released the single "Under the Sun". The song "Under the Sun" won the Faroese Planet Award 2009 for the Best Song of the Year. In 2010 the band released the album Revolt, which is in English. The Dreams released a couple more singles until they disbanded in 2014.

Andreason also fronted the Faroese rock band, Glóð, formed as a side-project of sorts in 2009. In 2011 the band released their first album, "Mítt Stríð Er Mítt Ríki".

Andreason has played in concerts with several Danish bands, participated in big events and was interviewed by DR1 Boogie Listen, principal charge of playing music in the country. He currently fronts the symphonic alternative rock outfit Swardi (named after Andreasen's childhood nickname). In August 2016, the band performed songs from their yet-to-be-released debut album (under the title Swim Baby, Swim) in Copenhagen. In late 2018, the band released the self-titled Swardi through Gateway Music to most major online music distribution channels.

== Personal life ==
Hans Edward is in a relationship with Jórun Mc.Leod Jacobsen, with whom he has a child, Klæmint Mc.Leod Andreasen.
