= Revolt (The Dreams album) =

Studio album by The Dreams
- Released: February 22, 2010
- Length: 38:37
- Label: Black Pelican
- Producer: Chief 1

The Dreams chronology
| Den Nye By (2008) | Revolt (2010) |

Singles from Revolt
- 1. "Under the Sun" Released: October 2009; 2. "Revolt" Released: February 2010; 3. "The Optimist" Released: June 2010

Revolt is the second studio album by Faroese alternative rock band The Dreams, released on February 22, 2010. Published by Black Pelican and recorded in the Chief Management Studio, it was produced by Chief 1 (Lars Pedersen). The album comprises ten songs all written in English, because they want to reach not only Denmark, also other countries. Three singles were released from this album: "Under the Sun", "Revolt" and "The Optimist".

In March 2010 Revolt peaked at number 11 on the Danish Album Chart.

== Track listing ==
| No. | Title | Length |
|---|---|---|
| 1. | "Revolt" | 3:30 |
| 2. | "We Are the Murderers" | 3:27 |
| 3. | "Under the Sun" | 3:51 |
| 4. | "Black Sheep" | 2:57 |
| 5. | "United We Fall" | 3:17 |
| 6. | "Not Sad Forever" | 3:25 |
| 7. | "The Optimist" | 3:37 |
| 8. | "Too Late to Cry" | 3:11 |
| 9. | "This Is Not a Love Song" | 2:13 |
| 10. | "Insomnia Suite" | 7:09 |
| Total length: | | 38:37 |

== Singles ==
| Single | Chart (DEN) | Year |
|---|---|---|
| Under the Sun | 1 | 2009 |
| Revolt | 1 | 2010 |
| The Optimist | - | 2010 |

== Personnel ==
- Hans Edward Andreasen – lead vocals, guitar
- Heini Gilstón Corfitz Andersen – lead guitar, backing vocals
- Eirikur Gilstón Corfitz Andersen – bass, backing vocals
- Heini Mortensen - drums, percussion
