= Amin Jensen =

Danish actor and comedian (born 1970)

- Born: Amin René Marott Jensen; 22 January 1970 (age 56); Glostrup, Denmark
- Occupations: Actor, comedian, TV host
- Years active: 1993 – present
- Website: http://www.aminjensen.dk

Amin René Marott Jensen (born in 1970) is a Danish actor and comedian best known as television host for the popular Danish musical game show Hit med sangen.

== Career ==
Amin Jensen made his stage debut as a stand-up comedian at Din's in Copenhagen in December 1993. Over the next year he worked as the audience warm-up comic for several Danish television programs, including Lykkehjulet, Ugen der Gak, Linen ud, Stjerneskud, Stjernetræf, Stjernejoker, Skjult Kamera and Tæl til 3.

From 1997 to 1999, Jensen played host on the TV2 television program "Hvem er hvem?". During the same period, Jensen opened his one-man comedy show 150 kg over bæltestedet. Then in 2000 Jensen landed the role of host on the DR1 primetime musical game show Hit med sangen. The role earned Jensen popstar status in Denmark, and he was named TV host of the year in 2000 by Danish magazines Se og Hør and Billedbladet. Jensen made 63 episodes from 2000 through 2004. In 2008, he even participated in Dansk Melodi Grand Prix, the Danish pre-selection for the Eurovision Song Contest, with the song Luciano, which is about the late tenor Luciano Pavarotti.

Beginning in 1994, Jensen provided Danish voice-overs for several animated features. His dubbing credits include Toy Story 2, Shrek in Shrek and Shrek 2, Stitch in Lilo & Stitch, President Arnold Schwarzenegger in The Simpsons Movie and many others. Jensen has also performed in feature films including the children's film Ørkenens juvel (Jewel of the Desert).

== Personal life ==
Amin René Marott Jensen was born on 22 January 1970 in Glostrup, Denmark and was raised in Albertslund near Copenhagen. As an overweight teenager, Jensen began weightlifting to get into shape. He discovered that he enjoyed it and eventually became the Danish National Champion, a 3-time Sealand Junior Champion, and earned a bronze medal at the Nordic Junior Championships.

Jensen was married in April 2003 but divorced one year later. As of January 2020, he is the father of three daughters.

In February 2010, a Facebook group titled RIP Amin Jensen began rumors that Jensen had died from a heart attack. Jensen reported the incident to the police and said that he can well take a joke, "but this was over the line".

== Filmography ==
=== Writer ===
- Blæs på DK (2005) (V) (writer)
- Hit med Amin (2003) (V) (writer)
- 150 kg over bæltestedet (2003) (V) (writer)
- Stort (2001) (V) (writer)
- Stand-up.dk (1 episode, 1997)

=== Miscellaneous Crew ===
- Tæl til 3 (1996) TV series (audience warm-up)
- Linen ud (1996) TV series (audience warm-up)
- Ugen der gak (1995) TV series (audience warm-up)
- Stjernejoker (1995) TV series (audience warm-up)
- Lykkehjulet (1994) TV series (audience warm-up)

=== Actor ===
- Ørkenens juvel (2001) .... Lille Knud ... aka Jewel of the Desert (International: English title)
- Olsen-bandens første kup' (1999) TV series
- Shrek (2001)..... Danish voice of Shrek
- Lilo & Stitch (2002).... Danish voice of Stitch
- Shrek 2 (2004).... Danish voice of Shrek
- Lilo & Stitch 2 (2005).... Danish voice of Stitch

=== Self ===
- Gu'skelov du kom (2 episodes, 2006–2007)
- 9 ud af 10 .... Himself (1 episode, 2006)
- Fantastiske 5 – I den gode smags tjeneste, De .... Himself (1 episode, 2006)
- Go' aften Danmark .... Himself / ... (3 episodes, 2003–2005)
- Amin Jensen: Blæs på DK (2005) (V) .... Himself/Various Roles
- aHA! .... Himself (2 episodes, 2003–2005)
- Endelig fredag (2003) TV series .... Himself – Host (unknown episodes, 2004)
- Hit med sangen .... Himself – Host (63 episodes, 2000–2004)
- Hit med Amin (2003) (V) .... Himself/Various Roles
- Mit sande jeg .... Himself (1 episode, 2003)
- Amin Jensen – 150 kg over bæltestedet (2003) (V) .... Himself
- Sport2002 (2002) (TV) .... Himself – Performer
- Hækkenfeldt kobler af .... Himself (1 episode, 2002)
- Venner for livet .... Himself (1 episode, 2001)
- Amin Jensen: Stort (2001) (V) .... Himself – Performer/Musician (guitarist/pianist/harp/vocalist)
- Bare det var mig (2001) TV series .... Himself – Host
- Året der gik (2000) (TV) .... Himself
- Store klassefest, Den .... Himself (1 episode, 2000)
- KOKamok .... Himself (1 episode, 1999)
- Hvem er hvem? .... Himself – Host (2 episodes, 1997–1999)
- Stand-up.dk .... Himself (1 episode, 1997)
