= Julie Lund =

Danish actress (born 1979)

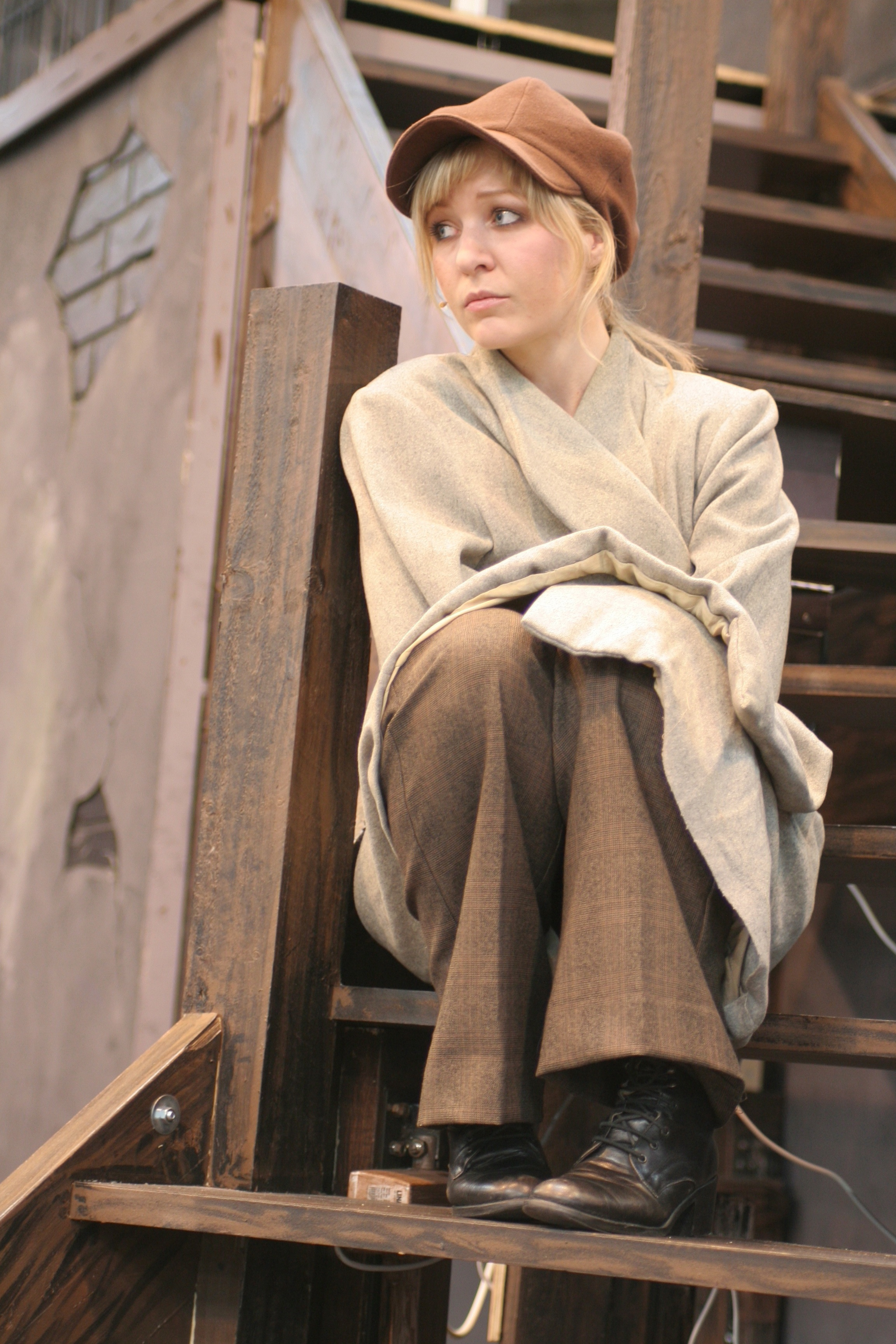
- Julie Lund - Eponine
- Born: 2 November 1979 (age 46)
- Occupations: Actress, television and radio presenter

Julie Lund (born 2 November 1979) is a Danish actress, radio host, and television presenter.
