= Kazakh Tazy =

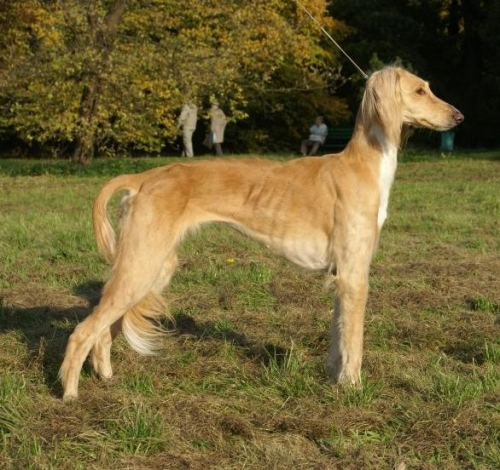
- Origin: Kazakhstan
Traits
Height	Males	60 to 72 centimetres (24 to 28 in)
	Females	55 to 60 centimetres (22 to 24 in)
Weight	Males	32–35 kilograms (71–77 lb)
	Females	20–30 kilograms (44–66 lb)
- Coat: short coat
Kennel club standards
- Fédération Cynologique Internationale: standard

Kazakh Tazy is a breed of sighthound hunting dog originating from Kazakhstan. Though it looks similar to the Saluki sighthound, it is a related but different dog breed.

Tazys are used in Kazakhstan primarily for hunting and are considered one of the oldest dog breeds in the world. Kazakh Tazy are recognized by International Canine Federation, but are not recognized by American Kennel Club, United Kennel Club nor Canadian Kennel Club. Presently, there are fewer than 300 purebred dogs, and the Kazakh government is taking action to prevent the breed from becoming extinct.

== History ==
=== Ancestry ===
The ancestry of this breed is unclear. The Kazakh Tazy shares DNA with many similar-looking dog breeds in North Africa, the Middle East, and Central Asia. The breed has a high level of genetic diversity.

=== Ancient History ===
In nomadic times, Tazies were prized for their skill at running down and killing wolves. They were also used to hunt hares, wild boars, foxes, badgers, deer, and saigas. They had a special status in Kazakh culture, with it being considered taboo to refer to this breed merely as a dog. It was said that a Kazakh would trade 47 horses for a single Kazakh Tazy.

=== Modern History ===
In 2014, the national hunting group Kanzonar organized a Kazakh Tazy dog show in Astana. This was done to spread awareness of the breed. The breed was accepted by the Fédération Cynologique Internationale in September 2024.

== Appearance ==
Tazys are medium-sized, deep-chested, and long-legged dogs, with short length hair on the body and longer hair on the tail and ears.

== Temperament ==
Tazys tend to be independent and aloof to strangers. The Kazakh Tazy is known for their playfulness, endurance, and vigilance. Tazys can run long distances at speeds of 12-15 kilometers (7–9 miles) per hour.

== See also ==
- List of dog breeds
- Sighthounds
