= Apache Records =

Apache Records was a small music recording label with a studio located in Crestview, Florida, that released its first records in March 1960. The business was owned and operated by co-partners John Bowers and Brady Ward, with offices on Main Street in the central Okaloosa County county seat of Crestview.

The company featured local vocalists and groups, and utilized a pressing plant operated by RCA Records in Indianapolis, Indiana, to produce its releases.

The first two releases, which were distributed beginning on March 1, 1960, were 45 rpm singles, one being "Wiggle It Baby", backed with "Please Believe Me Darling", by local African-American Crestview artist Cook Jr., backed by Mobile, Alabama combo the Rocking Aces. The other release was "The Chicken Shack Boogie", backed with "I Want To Jump With You Baby", by "Mobile Negro vocalist Clyde King", also backed by the Rocking Aces.

"Bowers has just returned from a trip through Louisiana, Kentucky, Georgia and Alabama lining up wholesale sellers for the records and 500 records have been released to deejays throughout the country. These records are already in record shops in Crestview and surrounding areas. Other recordings are already in Indiana being pressed for release. Says co-owner Ward: 'We are willing to audition any local group who feel they have musical talent.'"
