= Een speeldoos =

1963 song by Annie Palmen

Single by Annie Palmen
- Language: Dutch
- Released: 1963
- Genre: Pop
- Label: Philips
- Songwriter: Pieter Goemans

Eurovision Song Contest 1963 entry
- Country: Netherlands
- Artist: Annie Palmen
- Language: Dutch
- Conductor: Eric Robinson

Finals performance
- Final result: 13th
- Final points: 0

Entry chronology
- ◄ "Katinka" (1962)
- "Jij bent mijn leven" (1964) ►

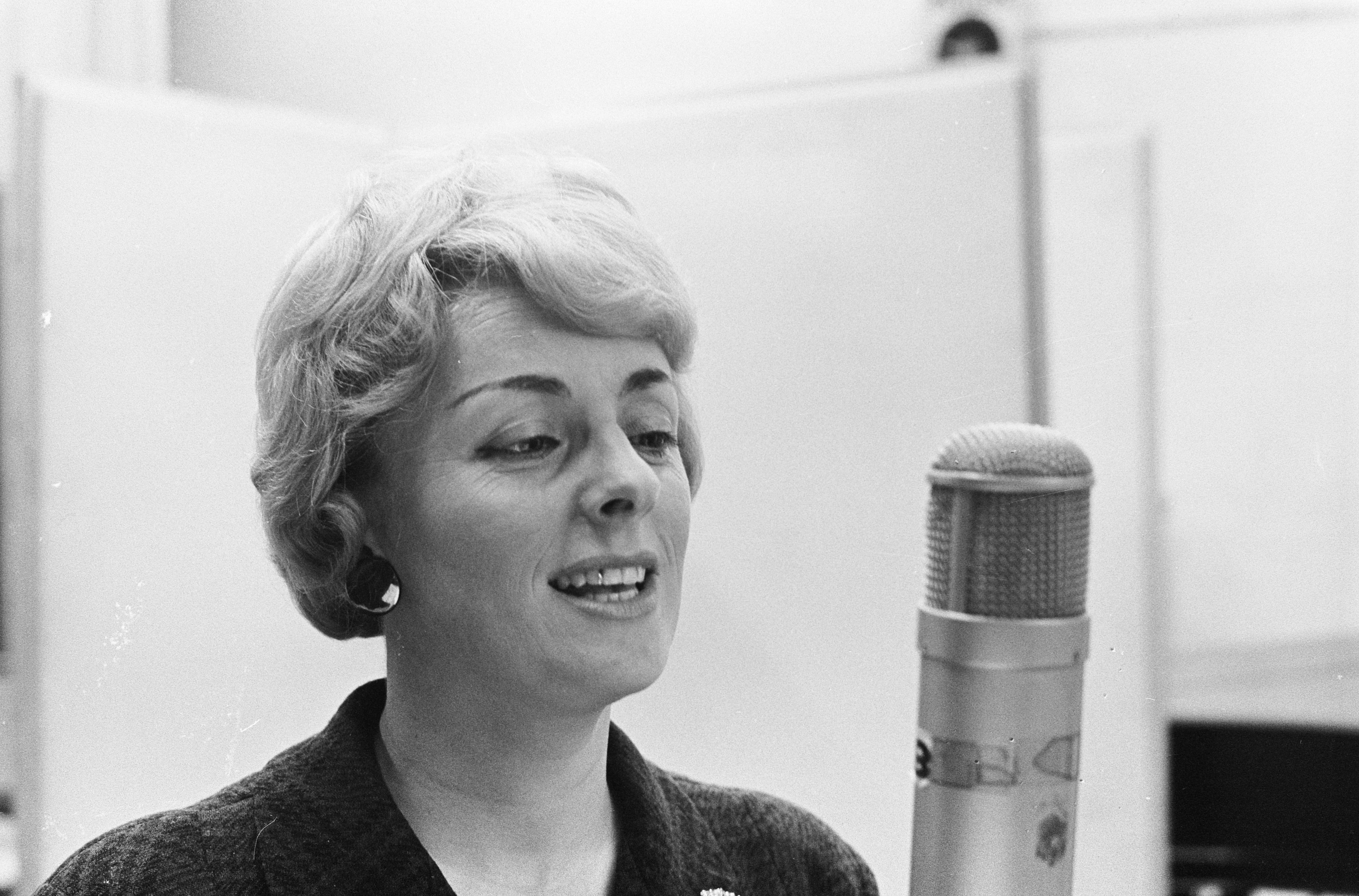
Annie Palmen recorded the song at the Phonogram Studio in Hilversum (1963)

Een speeldoos (Dutch for "A music box"), sometimes known as Speeldoos, is a song written by Pieter Goemans and performed by Dutch singer Annie Palmen. It was released as a 45 rpm single in 1963. It represented the Netherlands in the Eurovision Song Contest 1963.

== Eurovision ==
=== National selection ===
The song was selected on 23 January 1963 by the NTS during the Nationaal Songfestival 1963, originally under the title "Geen ander" (Nobody else).

The title was subsequently changed to "Een droombeeld" before finally being renamed "Een speeldoos". This final version represented the Netherlands at the Eurovision Song Contest 1963 in London.

=== At the contest ===
The song was performed entirely in Dutch, the Netherlands’ official language, as was customary before 1966. The orchestra was conducted by British conductor Eric Robinson.

Een speeldoos was performed second on the night, following the United Kingdom’s "Say Wonderful Things" by Ronnie Carroll and preceding Germany’s Marcel by Heidi Brühl.

At the close of voting, the song received no points, placing joint last (13th=) with Norway’s Solhverv by Anita Thallaug, Finland’s Muistojeni laulu by Laila Halme, and Sweden’s En gång i Stockholm by Monica Zetterlund, out of 16 entries.

== Track listing ==
All tracks are written by Pieter Goemans.

Side A
No.	Title	Writer(s)	Length
1.	"Een speeldoos"	Pieter Goemans
2.	"Bij jou"	Johan Hendrik Holshuysen, Karel Prior

== Release history ==
Country	Date	Format	Label
Netherlands	1963	7" single	Philips
