= Denmark in the Eurovision Song Contest 1963 =

- Eurovision Song Contest 1963
- Participating broadcaster: Danmarks Radio (DR)
- Country: Denmark
- Selection process: Dansk Melodi Grand Prix 1963
- Selection date: 24 February 1963

Competing entry
- Song: "Dansevise"
- Artist: Grethe and Jørgen Ingmann
- Songwriters: Otto Francker; Sejr Volmer-Sørensen

Placement
- Final result: 1st, 42 points

Participation chronology

Denmark was represented at the Eurovision Song Contest 1963 with the song "Dansevise", composed by Otto Francker, with lyrics by Sejr Volmer-Sørensen, and performed by Grethe and Jørgen Ingmann. The Danish participating broadcaster, Danmarks Radio (DR), organised the Dansk Melodi Grand Prix 1963 in order to select its entry for the contest.

== Before Eurovision ==
=== Melodi Grand Prix 1963 ===
Danmarks Radio (DR) held the Dansk Melodi Grand Prix 1963 on 24 February at the Tivoli Concert Hall in Copenhagen, hosted by Marianne Birkelund. Eight songs took part with the winner being chosen by a 10-member jury. Other past and future Eurovision entrants competing were Birthe Wilke (1957 and 1959), Dario Campeotto (1961), Bjørn Tidmand (1964), and Gitte Hænning (Germany 1973).

Melodi Grand Prix – 24 February 1963
R/O	Artist	Song	Songwriter(s)	Place
1	Melody Mixers	"Harlekin og Colmbine"	John Andreasson	6
2	Dario Campeotto	"Tiden er en gammal bekendt"	Thøger Olesen; Aksel V. Rasmussen	5
3	Gitte Hænning	"Lille sarte kvinde"	Ida & Bent From; Bjarne Hoyer	4
4	Bjørn Tidmand	"Amiga mia"	Hans Schreiber; Sejr Volmer-Sørensen	2
5	Grethe Sønck	"Kære du"	Poul Nordlænder; Sejr Volmer-Sørensen	7
6	Preben Mahrt	"Abstrakt"	Otto Lington; Carl Andersen	8
7	Grethe and Jørgen Ingmann	"Dansevise"	Otto Francker; Sejr Volmer-Sørensen	1
8	Birthe Wilke	"Pourquoi"	Børge Nordlund; Sejr Volmer-Sørensen	3

== At Eurovision ==
On the night of the final, the Ingmanns performed 8th in the running order, following Finland and preceding Yugoslavia. Voting was by each national jury awarding 5-4-3-2-1 to their top 5 songs, and at the close of the voting "Dansevise" had received 42 points, bringing Denmark's first victory in the contest. The Danish jury awarded its 5 points to Italy.

The contest was televised on Danmarks Radio TV and on radio station Program 1, both with commentary by Ole Mortensen.

=== Voting ===
Points awarded to Denmark
Score	Country
5 points	Belgium; Finland; Luxembourg; Netherlands; Sweden
4 points	Norway
3 points	Austria; Switzerland; United Kingdom
2 points	Germany; Italy
1 point	

Points awarded by Denmark
Score	Country
5 points	Italy
4 points	Switzerland
3 points	United Kingdom
2 points	Luxembourg
1 point	Austria
