= 1963 in Nordic music =

The following is a list of notable events and compositions of the year 1963 in Nordic music.

== Events ==
- 23 March – The 8th Eurovision Song Contest is held in London and is won by Denmark, represented by husband-and-wife duo Grethe and Jørgen Ingmann Dansevise". Sweden, Finland and Norway finish in joint 13th and last place (with the Netherlands), all with no points.
- 15 May – At the 5th Annual Grammy Awards, Bent Fabric wins the Grammy Award for Best Contemporary Song for "Alley Cat".
- October – Thor's Hammer, also known as Hljómar or the Keflavik band, give their first public performance.

== New works ==
- Aarre Merikanto – Juha (opera; composed in 1922, premiered in 1963)
- Geirr Tveitt – A Hundred Hardanger Tunes arranged for orchestra
- Erland von Koch – Drei Orchesterminiaturen

== Popular music ==
- Four Cats – "Suuret setelit"
- Beppe Wolgers & Bobbie Ericsson – "En gång i Stockholm", performed by Monica Zetterlund

== New recordings ==
- Fred Åkerström – Fred Åkerström sjunger Ruben Nilson
- Sven-Bertil Taube – Carl Michael Bellman, volume 2

== Eurovision Song Contest ==
- Denmark in the Eurovision Song Contest 1963
- Finland in the Eurovision Song Contest 1963
- Norway in the Eurovision Song Contest 1963
- Sweden in the Eurovision Song Contest 1963

== Film music ==
- Ulf Björlin – Kurragömma
- Bo Nilsson – En söndag i september
- Charles Redland – Sten Stensson kommer tillbaka

== Births ==
- 15 May – Mika Vainio, Finnish electronic musician (died 2017)
- 26 December – Lars Ulrich, Danish heavy metal drummer

== Deaths ==
- 20 February – Jacob Gade, Danish violinist and composer (born 1879)
- 11 April – Arvid Gram Paulsen, Norwegian jazz saxophonist and trumpeter (born 1922)

== See also ==
- 1963 in Denmark
- 1963 in Iceland
- 1963 in Norwegian music
- 1963 in Sweden
