= Netherlands in the Eurovision Song Contest 1963 =

- Eurovision Song Contest 1963
- Participating broadcaster: Nederlandse Televisie Stichting (NTS)
- Country: Netherlands
- Selection process: Artist: Internal selection Song: Selection among Nationaal Songfestival entries
- Announcement date: 23 January 1963

Competing entry
- Song: "Een speeldoos"
- Artist: Annie Palmen
- Songwriter: Pieter Goemans

Placement
- Final result: 13th, 0 points

Participation chronology

The Netherlands was represented at the Eurovision Song Contest 1963 with the song "Een speeldoos", written by Pieter Goemans, and performed by Annie Palmen. The Dutch participating Broadcaster, Nederlandse Televisie Stichting (NTS), selected its entry through a national final, after having previously selected the performer internally. Palmen had previously taken part in the 1960 national final.

The 1963 Dutch selection is notable for the fact that the Nationaal Songfestival could not be broadcast due to industrial action, also that the title and lyrics of the winning song were changed twice before the Eurovision final.

== Before Eurovision ==
=== Cancellation of Nationaal Songfestival 1963 ===
The national final was scheduled to take place at the Tivoli in Utrecht on 23 January. However, a dispute between Nederlandse Televisie Stichting (NTS) and the members of its orchestra had led to the latter declaring strike action, so the selection was postponed. Annie Palmen, who previously won the 1960 Nationaal Songfestival was set to perform three songs; "Kijk, daar is de zon", "Geen ander", and "Hoor je mij".

Following the postponement of Nationaal Songfestival, it was revealed it was set to take place on 11 February in the Concordia Theatre in Bussum. However, due to the effects of the strike, NTS were given until 15 February to host Nationaal Songfestival 1963. Sometime later, NTS would later cancel Nationaal Songfestival in favor of an internal selection among the three songs.

On 8 February, Annie Palmen first presented and performed "Een speeldoos" on the Rudi Carrell Show. Prior to the cancellation of the national final, the lyrics and title of "Geen ander" were changed, firstly to "Een droombeld", then again to "Een speeldoos".

== At Eurovision ==
On the night of the final Palmen performed second in the running order, following the United Kingdom and preceding Germany. Voting was by each national jury awarding 5-4-3-2-1 points to their top five songs, and at the end of the evening "Een speeldoos" (along with the entries from Finland, Norway, and Sweden) had failed to pick up a single point, the third time the Netherlands had finished at the foot of the scoreboard. The Netherlands thus became the first country to score nul points twice, and in consecutive years. The Dutch jury awarded its 5 points to contest winners Denmark.

The Dutch entry was conducted at the contest by the musical director Eric Robinson.

=== Voting ===
The Netherlands did not receive any points at the Eurovision Song Contest 1963.

Points awarded by the Netherlands
Score	Country
5 points	Denmark
4 points	France
3 points	United Kingdom
2 points	Monaco
1 point	Italy
