= Switzerland in the Eurovision Song Contest 1963 =

- Eurovision Song Contest 1963
- Participating broadcaster: Swiss Broadcasting Corporation (SRG SSR)
- Country: Switzerland
- Selection process: Finale suisse du Grand Prix Eurovision de la Chanson
- Selection date: 9 February 1963

Competing entry
- Song: "T'en va pas"
- Artist: Esther Ofarim
- Songwriters: Émile Gardaz; Géo Voumard

Placement
- Final result: 2nd, 40 points

Participation chronology

Switzerland was represented at the Eurovision Song Contest 1963 with the song "T'en va pas", composed by Géo Voumard, with lyrics by Émile Gardaz, and performed by Israeli singer Esther Ofarim. The Swiss participating broadcaster, the Swiss Broadcasting Corporation (SRG SSR), selected its entry through a national final after selecting their previous entry via internal selection.

== Before Eurovision ==
=== Regional selections ===
The Swiss Broadcasting Corporation (SRG SSR) held a national final to select its entry for the Eurovision Song Contest 1963. The national final was a collaboration between three broadcasters that comprised SRG SSR: the Swiss-German and Romansh broadcaster Schweizer Fernsehen der deutschen und rätoromanischen Schweiz (SF DRS), the Swiss-French broadcaster Télévision suisse romande (TSR), and the Swiss-Italian broadcaster Televisione svizzera di lingua italiana (TSI). Unlike previous Swiss national finals, where all composite broadcasters internally selected their entries, said broadcasters could hold their own regional selection methods for the first time. Schweizer Fernsehen der deutschen und rätoromanischen Schweiz (SF DRS) held a public preselection, while the remaining regional broadcasters internally selected their entries.

==== Schlagerwettbewerb Beromünster 1963 ====
The song submission period for the Swiss-German regional selections was open in August 1962, where anyone native to Switzerland or foreigners who resided there for at least 5 years were eligible. Applications could be sent to studios in Basel, Bern, or Zurich, where detailed information of the rules could be found. The deadline for song submissions was on 6 October.

Listeners of Radio Beromünster were invited to act as a jury and would register to vote by sending postcards to Radio Studio Basel marked "Schlagerwettbewerb" with their favorite song written down. The event was broadcast on radio on 3 December at 20:30 CET (19:30 UTC) and was hosted by A. Werner. The nine candidate songs were sung by Anita Traversi— who previously represented Switzerland in 1960, Mario Ronga, Virginia Markus, and Willy Schmid with Cédric Dumont accompanying the orchestra. The two songs with the most votes from the public would be chosen to advance in the nationwide final.

On 10 December, it was revealed that the two winning songs were "Komme mit mir" by Anita Traversi and "Einmal in Mexico" by Willy Schmid. Further details of the event, including the full results and remaining song titles remain unknown.

=== Finale suisse du Grand Prix Eurovision de la Chanson ===
Six songs took part in the nationwide selection, with two songs being performed each in French, German, and Italian. Four artists took part to represent Switzerland, among whom was Anita Traversi— who represented Switzerland in 1960 and would later repeat this in the following year.

Competing entries
Broadcaster	Artist	Song	Songwriter(s)		Language
Broadcaster	Artist	Song	Composer(s)	Lyricist	Language
DRS	Anita Traversi	"Komme mit mir"	Renato Bui	Velio Bergellini	German
DRS	Willy Schmid	"Einmal in Mexico"	Emil Forster		German
TSR	Jo Roland	"Le petit bolero"	Gaby Osterwalder	Louis Rey	French
TSR	Esther Ofarim	"T'en va pas"	Géo Voumard	Emile Gardaz	French
TSI	Anita Traversi	"Voglio vivere"	Giovanni Pelli; Mario Robbiani	Misselvia	Italian
TSI	Anita Traversi	"La più bella canzone del mondo"	Italo Notari		Italian

Swiss French broadcaster Télévision suisse romande (TSR) staged the national final on 9 February 1963 at 20:30 CET (19:30 UTC) in Geneva. It was presented by Heidi Abel, Mascia Cantoni, and Claude Evelyne. The Radiosa Orchestra, which served as the show's orchestra, was accompanied by Cédric Dumont and Luc Hoffmann.

The voting consisted of three sets of nine-member regional juries from Zürich, Lugano, and Geneva. Each regional jury would give 3 points to their favorite song, 2 to their second favorite, and 1 to their third favorite. The winner was the song "T'en va pas", written by Émile Gardaz and composed by Géo Voumard, and performed by Esther Ofarim. The winning composers were not revealed until the end of the show. Known results are listed in the chart below.

Final – 9 February 1963
R/O	Artist	Song	Total	Place				
R/O	Artist	Song	Total	Place	1	Anita Traversi	"Komme mit mir"	Unknown
2	Jo Roland	"Le petit bolero"						Unknown
3	Anita Traversi	"Voglio vivere"	Unknown	3				
4	Esther Ofarim	"T'en va pas"	59	1				
5	Anita Traversi	"La più bella canzone del mondo"	7	5				
6	Willy Schmid	"Einmal in Mexico"	6	6				

=== Releases ===
Esther Ofarim recorded and released "T'en va pas" in a single titled after the song in 1963. In 1998, the song was featured in a CD compilation titled "Concours Eurovision De La Chanson 1956-1998: Schweizer Beiträge", which compiled every Swiss Eurovision entry at the time.

Recordings of Anita Traversi's Italian entries have been preserved in the Swiss National Sound Archives. Cover versions of both songs in German were released on the same single titled after "Einmal In Mexico" in 1963. The titular song was covered by the Hansi Schwindt Trio, while "Komme mit mir" was covered by Annemarie Bläuer.

The recap segment of the selection was made available on Radio Télévision Suisse's (RTS) website, featuring partial instrumentals of the participating songs in reverse order.

== At Eurovision ==
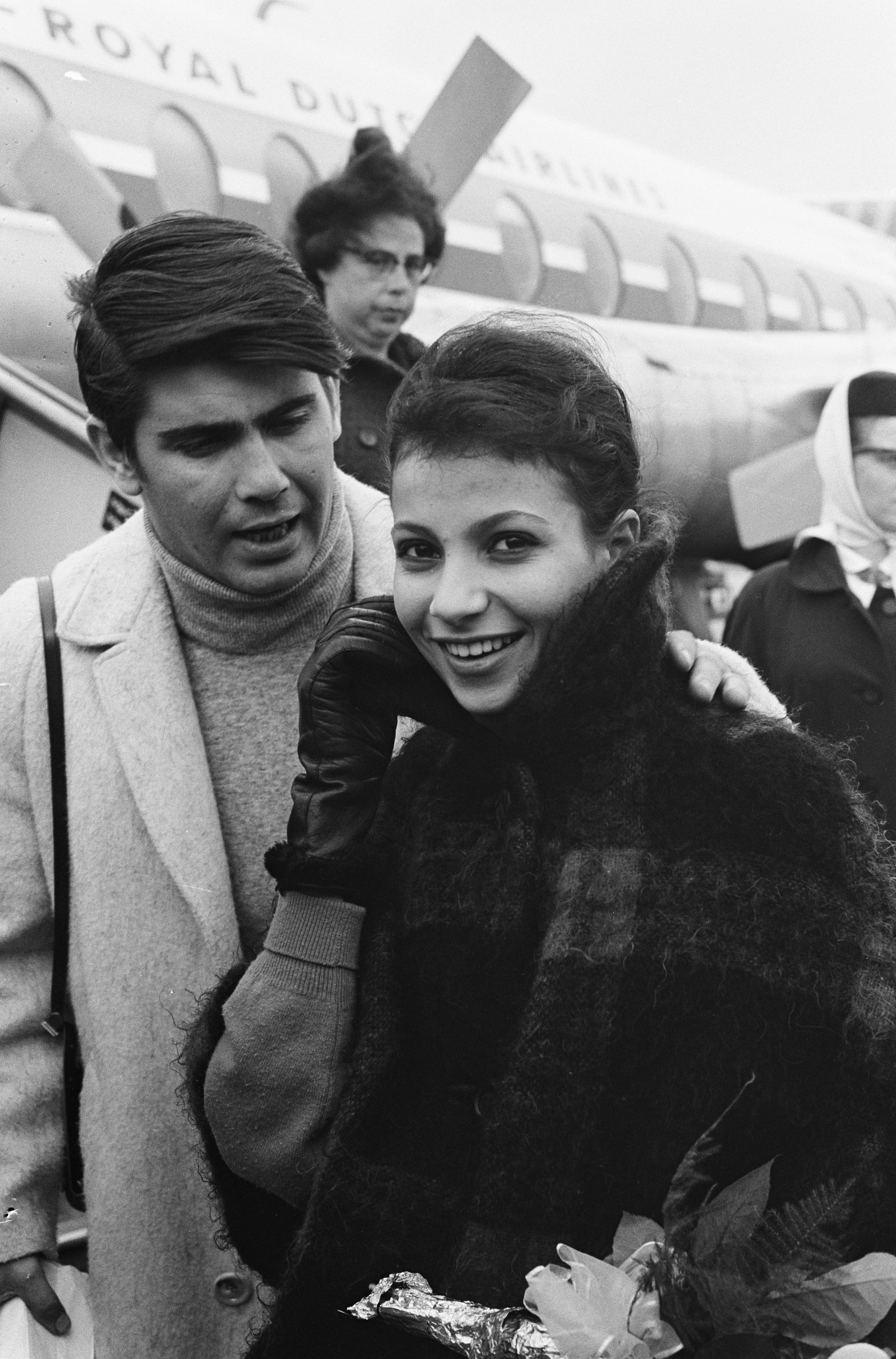
Esther Ofarim represented Switzerland in the Eurovision Song Contest 1963, where she finished in second place

At the Eurovision Song Contest 1963 in London, the Swiss entry was the tenth song of the night following Yugoslavia and preceding France. The Swiss entry was conducted by Eric Robinson, who reprised his role as the musical director of that year's contest, after previously doing so in the 1960 contest, and previously conducted multiple British entries. The Swiss entry performed as the one hundredth song to perform in the history of the Eurovision Song Contest.

The contest was broadcast on SRG SSR via TV DRS (with commentary from Theodor Haller) and Radio Beromünster (Note: Delayed broadcast on 25 March at 20:00 (CET)) in German-speaking Switzerland, TSR (with commentary from Georges Hardy) and Radio Sottens in Romandy, and TSI (with commentary from Renato Tagliani) and Radio Monte Ceneri in Ticino.

Each participating broadcaster assembled a 20-member juries awarded 1-5 points to their five favourite songs, with 5 points going towards the jury's most favorite song. At the close of voting, Switzerland had received forty points in total; the country finished second among sixteen participants following an issue during the voting procedure.

Points awarded to Switzerland
Score	Country
5 points	Austria; Italy; United Kingdom
4 points	Belgium; Denmark; Germany; Monaco; Spain
3 points	Luxembourg
2 points	
1 point	Norway; Sweden

Points awarded by Switzerland
Score	Country
5 points	Italy
4 points	France
3 points	Denmark
2 points	Luxembourg
1 point	Monaco

=== Voting issue and controversy ===
During the voting sequence, the Norwegian spokesperson incorrectly announced their votes when they were called. They were allowed by presenter Katie Boyle to correct their votes after the last scheduled voter from Luxembourg finished announcing their votes. In these initial votes, the Norwegian jury gave 3 points to Switzerland and 2 to Denmark. Until they were called again, Switzerland appeared to be in the lead with 42 points, while Denmark was in second place with only 40. When the Norwegian jury was called again however, the corrected votes gave Denmark 4 points, while Switzerland only received one point. These corrected votes heavily impacted the results, as Denmark were announced as the winner with 42 points over Switzerland with 40 points.

Following the contest, SRG SSR reportedly intended to appeal, but ended up checking the transmissions of the votes after several complaints from Swiss viewers and listeners. A month after the contest, it was confirmed that the Norwegian jury did not change their votes.
