= Ingmann =

Ingmann is a surname. Notable people with the surname include:

- Grethe and Jørgen Ingmann, Danish singers and musicians
- Grethe Ingmann (1938–1990), Danish singer
- Jørgen Ingmann (1925–2015), musician from Copenhagen, Denmark
