= United Kingdom in the Eurovision Song Contest 1963 =

- Eurovision Song Contest 1963
- Participating broadcaster: British Broadcasting Corporation (BBC)
- Country: United Kingdom
- Selection process: A Song for Europe 1963
- Selection date: 24 February 1963

Competing entry
- Song: "Say Wonderful Things"
- Artist: Ronnie Carroll
- Songwriters: Philip Green; Norman Newell

Placement
- Final result: 4th, 28 points

Participation chronology

The United Kingdom was represented at the Eurovision Song Contest 1963 with the song "Say Wonderful Things", composed by Philip Green, with lyrics by Norman Newell, and performed by Ronnie Carroll. The British participating broadcaster, the British Broadcasting Corporation (BBC), selected its entry through a national final. In addition, the BBC was also the host broadcaster and staged the event at the BBC Television Centre in London, after the winner of the previous edition, Radiodiffusion-Télévision Française (RTF) from France, opted not to host the event. Carroll had already represented the United Kingdom at the previous contest.

== Before Eurovision ==
=== A Song for Europe 1963 ===
The British Broadcasting Corporation (BBC) held a national preselection to choose the song that would go to the Eurovision Song Contest 1963. It was held on 24 February 1963 and presented by David Jacobs.

R/O	Artist	Song	Points	Place
1	Anne Shelton	"My Continental Love"	9	4
2	Ronnie Carroll	"Say Wonderful Things"	33	1
3	Barry Barnett	"If You Ever Leave Me"	20	2
4	Johnny Towers	"This Kind of Love"	5	6
5	Maureen Evans	"Pick the Petals"	17	3
6	Vince Hill	"A Day at the Seaside"	8	5
7	Jimmy Justice	"The Little Cracked Bell of San Raquel"	4	7

== At Eurovision ==
"Say Wonderful Things" won the national and went on to come 4th in the contest.

In addition to hosting the national final, David Jacobs provided the BBC TV commentary at the Eurovision final. The BBC appointed Nicholas Parsons as its spokesperson to announce the British jury's votes.

=== Voting ===
Points awarded to the United Kingdom
Score	Country
5 points	Norway; Spain
4 points	
3 points	Denmark; Finland; France; Netherlands; Yugoslavia
2 points	Sweden
1 point	Monaco

Points awarded by the United Kingdom
Score	Country
5 points	Switzerland
4 points	Austria
3 points	Denmark
2 points	Italy
1 point	Monaco
