= Uno per tutte =

1963 song by Emilio Pericoli

Single by Emilio Pericoli
- Language: Italian
- Released: 1963
- Composer: Tony Renis
- Lyricists: Mogol; Alberto Testa

Eurovision Song Contest 1963 entry
- Country: Italy
- Artist: Emilio Pericoli
- Language: Italian
- Composer: Tony Renis
- Lyricists: Mogol; Alberto Testa

Finals performance
- Final result: 3rd
- Final points: 37

Entry chronology
- ◄ "Addio, addio" (1962)
- "Non ho l'età" (1964) ►

"Uno per tutte" ("One [male] for all [females]") is a song written by Tony Renis, Mogol and Alberto Testa. It was first performed by Renis and Emilio Pericoli during the 13th Sanremo Music Festival, in February 1963, where they performed two different versions of the song, placing first in the competition. The song was then chosen to represent Italy in the Eurovision Song Contest 1963, where it was performed by Pericoli.

The song is a love ballad, in which Pericoli professes his undying love to Claudia. He then confesses the same to Nadia, Julia and Laura before declaring that "on my mouth I have... kisses for you / and I'm dedicating them to the first one who will say yes". He seems unaware of the potential consequences of being caught in this act.

The song was performed sixth on the night, following Norway's Anita Thallaug with "Solhverv" and preceding Finland's Laila Halme with "Muistojeni laulu". At the close of voting, it had received 37 points, placing 3rd in a field of 16.

It was succeeded as Italian representative at the 1964 contest by Gigliola Cinquetti with "Non ho l'età".

== Charts ==
Chart (1963)	Peak position
Italy (Musica e dischi)	1
