= Spain in the Eurovision Song Contest 1963 =

- Eurovision Song Contest 1963
- Participating broadcaster: Televisión Española (TVE)
- Country: Spain
- Selection process: Internal selection

Competing entry
- Song: "Algo prodigioso"
- Artist: José Guardiola
- Songwriters: Fernando García Morcillo; Camillo Murillo Janero

Placement
- Final result: 12th, 2 points

Participation chronology

Spain was represented at the Eurovision Song Contest 1963 with the song "Algo prodigioso", composed by Fernando García Morcillo, with lyrics by Camillo Murillo Janero, and performed by José Guardiola. The Spanish participating broadcaster, Televisión Española (TVE), internally selected its entry for the contest. The song, performed in position 12, placed twelfth out of sixteen competing entries with 2 points.

== Before Eurovision ==
Conflicting reports state that Televisión Española's (TVE) aim was to use the Mediterranean Song Festival to choose its entry for the Eurovision Song Contest 1963. The song "Nubes de colores", composed by Augusto Algueró, with lyrics by Antonio Guijarro, had won the 1962 song festival performed by both José Guardiola and Monna Bell, (Note: Beating songs from Cyprus, France, Greece, Italy, Malta, Monaco, and Spain; each sung by two different performers, one accompanied by a large orchestra and the other by a smaller ensemble.) but the result was declared null and void the day after the final because a fix was discovered in the voting process. Attendees were given a voting ballot along with their admission ticket; however, on the final night of the festival, more ballots were counted than attendees. (Note: In the final, held on 24 September 1962 at the Sports Palace in Barcelona, 6,807 ballots were counted, exceeding by 1,030 the number of attendees in the hall, which was 5,777. This was possible because the ballots were not marked as to which night of the festival they belonged, and in the two semifinals many attendees did not vote and kept their ballots.) The ten songs in the final were equally declared finalists, without any ranking.

TVE opened a song submission period between 21 January and 4 February 1963 for the top three best placed composers and lyricists with Spanish nationality in any of the song contests held in Spain in 1962. The Spanish songwriters among the ten finalists in the Mediterranean Song Festival were allowed to participate. TVE internally selected "Algo prodigioso", composed by Fernando García Morcillo, with lyrics by Camillo Murillo Janero, and performed by José Guardiola, as its entry for Eurovision among the songs received.

== At Eurovision ==
The Eurovision Song Contest was held on 23 March 1963 at the BBC Television Centre in London, United Kingdom. José Guardiola performed "Algo prodigioso" twelfth in the running order, following France and preceding Sweden. Rafael Ibarbia conducted the event's orchestra performance of the Spanish entry. The song received two points from Yugoslavia, placing twelfth in a field of sixteen.

TVE broadcast the contest in Spain on its television service with commentary by Federico Gallo.

=== Voting ===
Points awarded to Spain
Score	Country
5 points	
4 points	
3 points	
2 points	Yugoslavia
1 point	

Points awarded by Spain
Score	Country
5 points	United Kingdom
4 points	Switzerland
3 points	Italy
2 points	Yugoslavia
1 point	France
