= Dansevise =

1963 song by Grethe and Jørgen Ingmann

Single by Grethe and Jørgen Ingmann
- Language: Danish
- B-side: "Forevigt Forbi"
- Released: 1 April 1963
- Length: 2:57
- Label: Metronome
- Composer: Otto Francker
- Lyricist: Sejr Volmer-Sørensen

Eurovision Song Contest 1963 entry
- Country: Denmark
- Artists: Grethe and Jørgen Ingmann
- Language: Danish
- Composer: Otto Francker
- Lyricist: Sejr Volmer-Sørensen
- Conductor: Kai Mortensen

Finals performance
- Final result: 1st
- Final points: 42

Entry chronology
- ◄ "Vuggevise" (1962)
- "Sangen om dig" (1964) ►

Official performance video
- "Dansevise" on YouTube

"Dansevise" (IPA: [ˈtænsəˌviːsə]; Danish for 'Dance song') is a song recorded by Danish husband and wife duo Grethe and Jørgen Ingmann with music composed by Otto Francker and Danish lyrics written by Sejr Volmer-Sørensen. It represented Denmark in the Eurovision Song Contest 1963 held in London, resulting the first entry performed by a duo to win the contest and also the first win from a Scandinavian country.

== Background ==
=== Conception ===
"Dansevise" was composed by Otto Francker with Danish lyrics by Sejr Volmer-Sørensen and recorded by Grethe and Jørgen Ingmann. It is a sophisticated ballad in which the singer sings the praises of dancing, specifically with her "beloved friend".

=== National selection ===
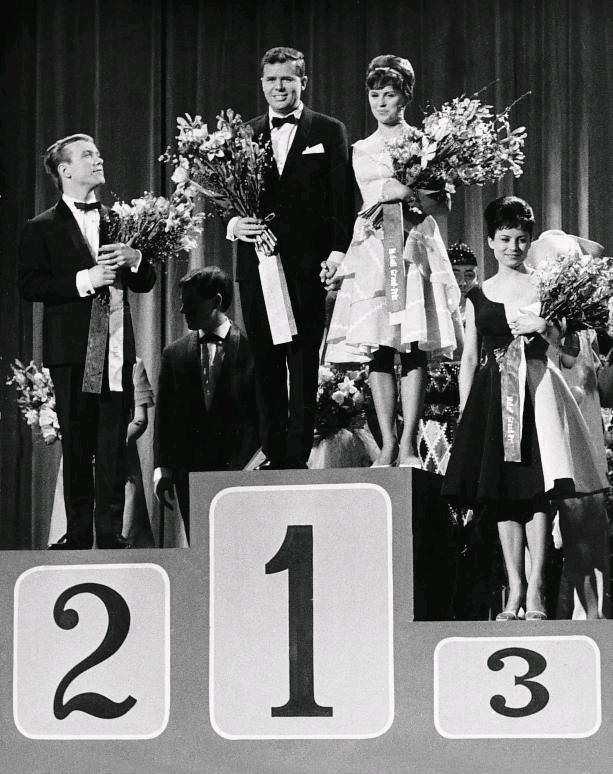
Grethe and Jørgen Ingmann winning the Dansk Melodi Grand Prix 1963.

On 24 February 1963, "Dansevise" performed by Grethe and Jørgen Ingmann competed in the 7th edition of the Dansk Melodi Grand Prix, winning the competition. As the festival was used by the Danish Broadcasting Corporation (DR) to select its song and performer for the 8th edition of the Eurovision Song Contest, the song became the Danish entrant, and Grethe and Jørgen Ingmann the performers, for Eurovision. The duo recorded the song in Danish, English –as "I loved you" with lyrics by Laura Weston–, and German –"Der Sommer ging vorüber" with lyrics by Ralph Maria Siegel–.

=== Eurovision ===
On 23 March 1963, the Eurovision Song Contest was held at the BBC Television Centre in London hosted by the British Broadcasting Corporation (BBC) and broadcast live throughout the continent. Grethe, accompanied by Jørgen Ingmann on guitar, performed "Dansevise" eighth on the evening, following Finland's "Muistojeni laulu" by Laila Halme and preceding Yugoslavia's "Brodovi" by Vice Vukov. Kai Mortensen conducted the event's live orchestra in the performance of the Danish entry.

At the close of voting, it had received 42 points, thus winning from a field of sixteen. It won the contest in the most controversial of circumstances, when it was alleged that the Norwegian jury had altered their votes in order to hand victory to Denmark at the expense of Switzerland.

=== Aftermath ===
Grethe and Jørgen Ingmann performed their song in the Eurovision twenty-fifth anniversary show Songs of Europe held on 22 August 1981 in Mysen. On 10 May 2014, the song was included in the opening sequence of the Eurovision Song Contest 2014 Grand Final, held in Copenhagen.

== Reception ==
John Kennedy O'Connor writes "the hypnotic tune was helped by the visual effects in the studio as a spinning vortex of whirling shapes spun around the screen, adding to the dream-like effect of the music. It was the only song that relied entirely on visual rather than physical props and this helped it stand out".

"Dansevise" has a very high reputation in Eurovision circles. The song often features prominently in polls to determine the best Eurovision winners, and is cited as one of the best examples of a Eurovision winner which does not date and still holds wide appeal.

== Chart performance ==
=== Weekly charts ===
Chart (1963)	Peak position
Belgium (Ultratop 50 Wallonia)	12
Finland (Singles sales chart)	22
Norway (VG-lista)	7
West Germany (GfK)	49

== Legacy ==
Grethe Sønck inherited the rights to the song after Sejr Volmer-Sørensen's death. Sønck took great care of the song and very few were allowed to record it or use it. After her death, it has become easier to get the rights to use it. Among other things, it has been used as background music in a bank advertisement.

The song is also published in Swedish by Anne-Lie Rydé and in Finnish by Laila Kinnunen. Danish hip-hop band Outlandish sampled the song in their track "Kom igen" which is featured in the game FIFA 07.

Preceded by "Un premier amour" by Isabelle Aubret	Eurovision Song Contest winners 1963	Succeeded by "Non ho l'età" by Gigliola Cinquetti
