= Pericoli =

Pericoli is an Italian surname. Notable people with the surname include:

- Emilio Pericoli (1928–2013), Italian singer
- Lea Pericoli (1935–2024), Italian tennis player, television presenter, and journalist
