= Germany in the Eurovision Song Contest 1963 =

- Eurovision Song Contest 1963
- Participating broadcaster: ARD (Note: Arbeitsgemeinschaft der öffentlich-rechtlichen Rundfunkanstalten der Bundesrepublik Deutschland) – Hessischer Rundfunk (HR)
- Country: Germany
- Selection process: Artist: Internal selection Song: National final
- Selection date: 28 February 1963

Competing entry
- Song: "Marcel"
- Artist: Heidi Brühl
- Songwriters: Charly Niessen

Placement
- Final result: 9th, 5 points

Participation chronology

Germany was represented at the Eurovision Song Contest 1963 with the song "Marcel", written by Charly Niessen, and performed by Heidi Brühl. The German participating broadcaster on behalf of ARD, Hessischer Rundfunk (HR), selected its entry through a national final, after having previously selected the performer internally. Brühl had finished runner-up in the 1960 national final.

== Before Eurovision ==
=== National final ===
The final was held at the television studios in Frankfurt. Brühl performed five songs and the winner was chosen by postcard voting. "Marcel" was a runaway winner, receiving almost two-thirds of all votes cast.

| R/O | Song | Votes | Place |
|---|---|---|---|
| 1 | "Die blaue Stunde" | 5,846 | 4 |
| 2 | "Das kleine Lied" | 5,011 | 5 |
| 3 | "Zum großen Glück" | 6,681 | 3 |
| 4 | "Marcel" | 55,119 | 1 |
| 5 | "Ein schöhner Tag" | 10,857 | 2 |

== At Eurovision ==
On the night of the final Brühl performed third in the running order, following the Netherlands and preceding Austria. Voting was by each national jury awarding 5-4-3-2-1 to their top 5 songs, and at the close "Marcel" had received 5 points (3 from Monaco and 2 from Norway), placing Germany 9th of the 16 entries. The German jury awarded its 5 points to Monaco.

=== Voting ===
Points awarded to Germany
| Score | Country |
|---|---|
| 5 points | |
| 4 points | |
| 3 points | Monaco |
| 2 points | Norway |
| 1 point | |

Points awarded by Germany
| Score | Country |
|---|---|
| 5 points | Monaco |
| 4 points | Switzerland |
| 3 points | Luxembourg |
| 2 points | Denmark |
| 1 point | France |
