= Irmeli Mäkelä =

Finnish pop singer (1942–2026)

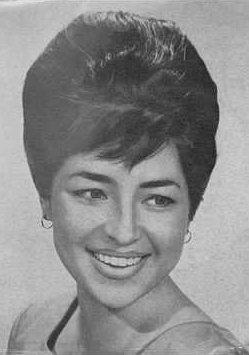
- Mäkelä in 1962
- Born: Hellä Muisto Irmeli Mäkelä; 18 October 1942; Kotka, Finland
- Died: 15 March 2026 (aged 83); Kotka, Finland
- Occupation: Pop singer
- Spouse: Johannes Liikanen

Hellä Muisto Irmeli Mäkelä (18 October 1942 – 15 March 2026), known professionally as Irmeli Mäkelä, was a Finnish pop singer.

== Early life and career ==
Mäkelä was born in Kotka on 18 October 1942. At the age of 15, she began her pop singing career as a soloist in an orchestra after she competed at a local singing competition. In her twenties, she received a recording contract from the record company Helsinki.

During her singing career, in 1959, Mäkelä collaborated with composer Erik Lindström, and sang the songs "Too Little Time" and "Taken by the Stream". In the same year, she sang the Finnish language cover song "Kun Ohi Käyt". In 1963, she competed for Finland at the Eurovision Song Contest - although she won qualification with the song "Muistojeni laulu", the Finnish committee decided to send Laila Halme to Britain to perform it in her place.

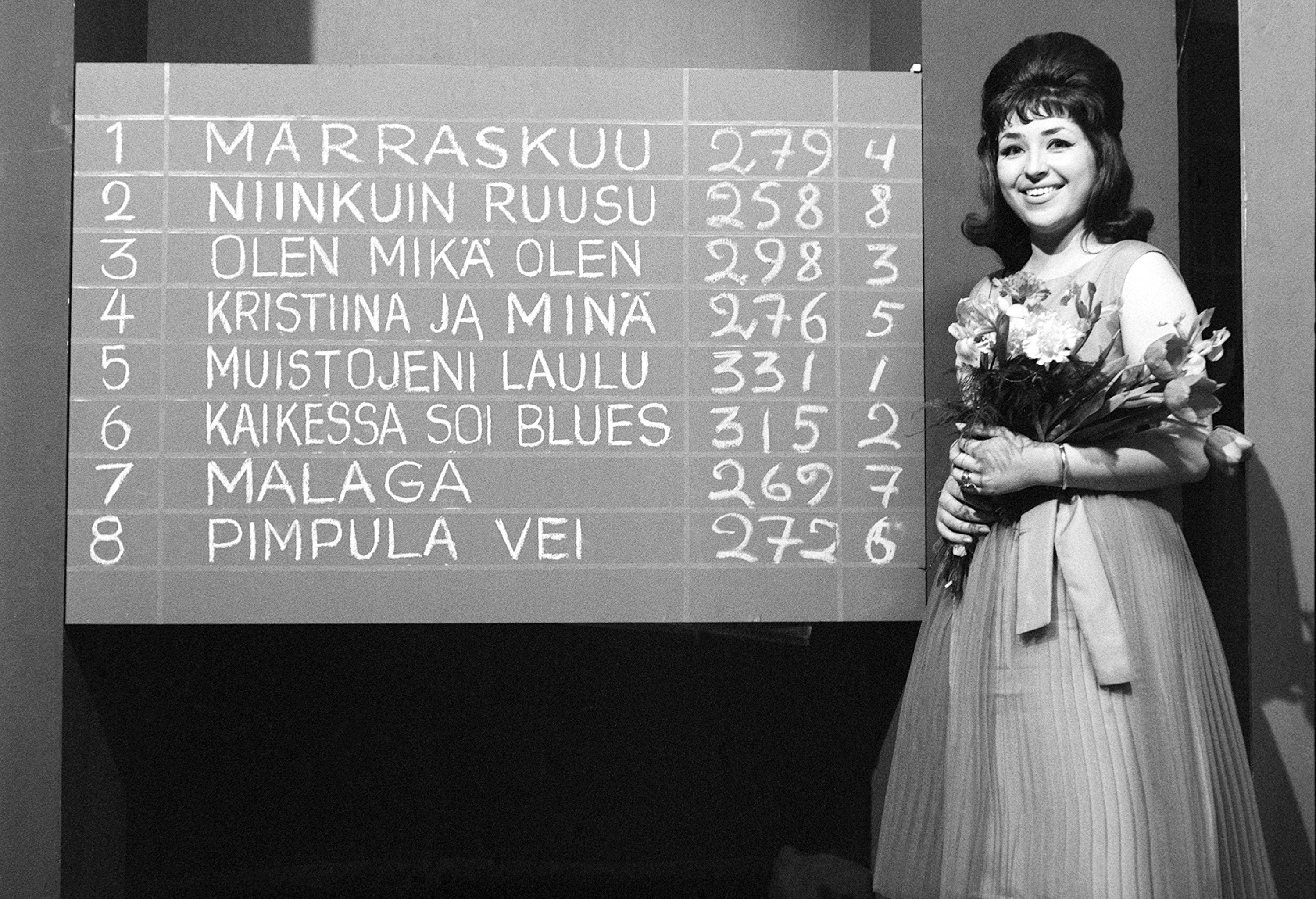
Mäkelä in 1963

Mäkelä retired her pop singing career in the late 1960s. After retiring as a pop singer, she performed as a mezzo-soprano, and opened a hair salon in Kotka. In 1974, musicologist Seppo Heikinheimo of Helsingin Sanomat wrote a favorable review upon Mäkelä's Carmen title role performance.

== Personal life and death ==
Mäkelä was married to Johannes Liikanen. Their marriage lasted until Mäkelä's death in 2026.

Mäkelä died in Kotka on 15 March 2026, at the age of 83.
