= Blonde in Bondage =

1957 Swedish film by Robert Brandt

- Double feature film poster
- Directed by: Robert Brandt
- Written by: Peter Bourne (Åke Björnefeldt); Börje Nyberg (story)
- Produced by: Tom Younger
- Starring: Mark Miller; Anita Thallaug; Lars Ekborg
- Cinematography: Bengt Lindström
- Edited by: Lennart Wallén
- Music by: Charles Redland
- Production company: Nyvefilm
- Distributed by: Freja Film; Distributors Corporation of America (US)
- Release date: 8 November 1957
- Running time: 87 minutes
- Country: Sweden
- Language: Swedish

Blonde in Bondage (Swedish: Blondin i fara) is a 1957 Swedish drama crime film directed by Robert Brandt (director), who also wrote lyrics to the film's two songs. Distributors Corporation of America released the film in the US as a double feature with The Flesh Is Weak (1957). It was shot at the Metronome Studios in Stockholm.

== Plot ==
New York City reporter Larry Brand is sent to Stockholm to do a story on Swedish morals. A traffic accident leads him into rescuing a strip tease artiste from drug addiction and pits him against a ruthless criminal gang.

== Cast ==
- Mark Miller as Larry Brand
- Anita Thallaug as Mona Mace
- Lars Ekborg as Max
- Ruth Johansson as Laila
- Birgitta Ander as Birgitta
- Eva Laräng as Ingrid
- Anita Strindberg as telephone operator (credited as Anita Edberg)
- Erik Strandmark as Olle
- Stig Järrel as Kreuger
- Börje Mellvig as Chief Inspector
- Dangy Helander as prostitute
- Norma Sjöholm as second prostitute
- Sangrid Nerfas taxi driver
- Alexander von Baumgarten as Kuger's valet
- John Starck as chief of guards

== Soundtrack ==
"The Blues", "Shock Around the Clock" (music by Ulf Carlén, lyrics by Robert Brandt).
