= Yugoslavia in the Eurovision Song Contest 1963 =

- Eurovision Song Contest 1963
- Participating broadcaster: Jugoslavenska radiotelevizija (JRT)
- Country: Yugoslavia
- Selection process: Internal selection
- Announcement date: 21 February 1963

Competing entry
- Song: "Brodovi"
- Artist: Vice Vukov
- Songwriters: Mario Nardelli

Placement
- Final result: 11th, 3 points

Participation chronology

Yugoslavia was represented at the Eurovision Song Contest 1963 with the song "Brodovi", written by Mario Nardelli, and performed by Vice Vukov. The Yugoslavian participating broadcaster, Jugoslavenska radiotelevizija (JRT), selected its entry through an internal selection.

== Before Eurovision ==
=== Internal selection ===
Jugoslavenska ratiotelevizija (JRT) decided to use an internal selection to select their entry for the Eurovision Song Contest 1963.

JRT opened a submission period for interested composers to submit their songs until 25 January 1963. The submission period was also for songs for the 1963 edition of the Opatija Festival. By the end of the submission period, over 400 entries had been submitted.

The internal selection took place in Zagreb on 21 February 1963. The result of the selection was decided by a jury including Mario Rijavec. JRT selected the song "Brodovi", written by Mario Nardelli, and sung by Vice Vukov. Additionally, JRT selected 28 songs for Opatija '63.

== At Eurovision ==
Vice Vukov performed 9th on the night of the Contest following Denmark and preceding Switzerland. At the close of the voting the song had received 3 points, placing 11th in a field of 16 competing countries.

The contest was broadcast on several channels of JRT. It is known to have been broadcast on television on Televizija Beograd, Televizija Zagreb, and Televizija Ljubljana, all with commentary by Saša Novak.

=== Voting ===
Points awarded to Yugoslavia
| Score | Country |
|---|---|
| 5 points | |
| 4 points | |
| 3 points | |
| 2 points | Spain |
| 1 point | France |

Points awarded by Yugoslavia
| Score | Country |
|---|---|
| 5 points | France |
| 4 points | Italy |
| 3 points | United Kingdom |
| 2 points | Spain |
| 1 point | Monaco |
