= Vice Vukov =

Croatian singer and politician (1936–2008)

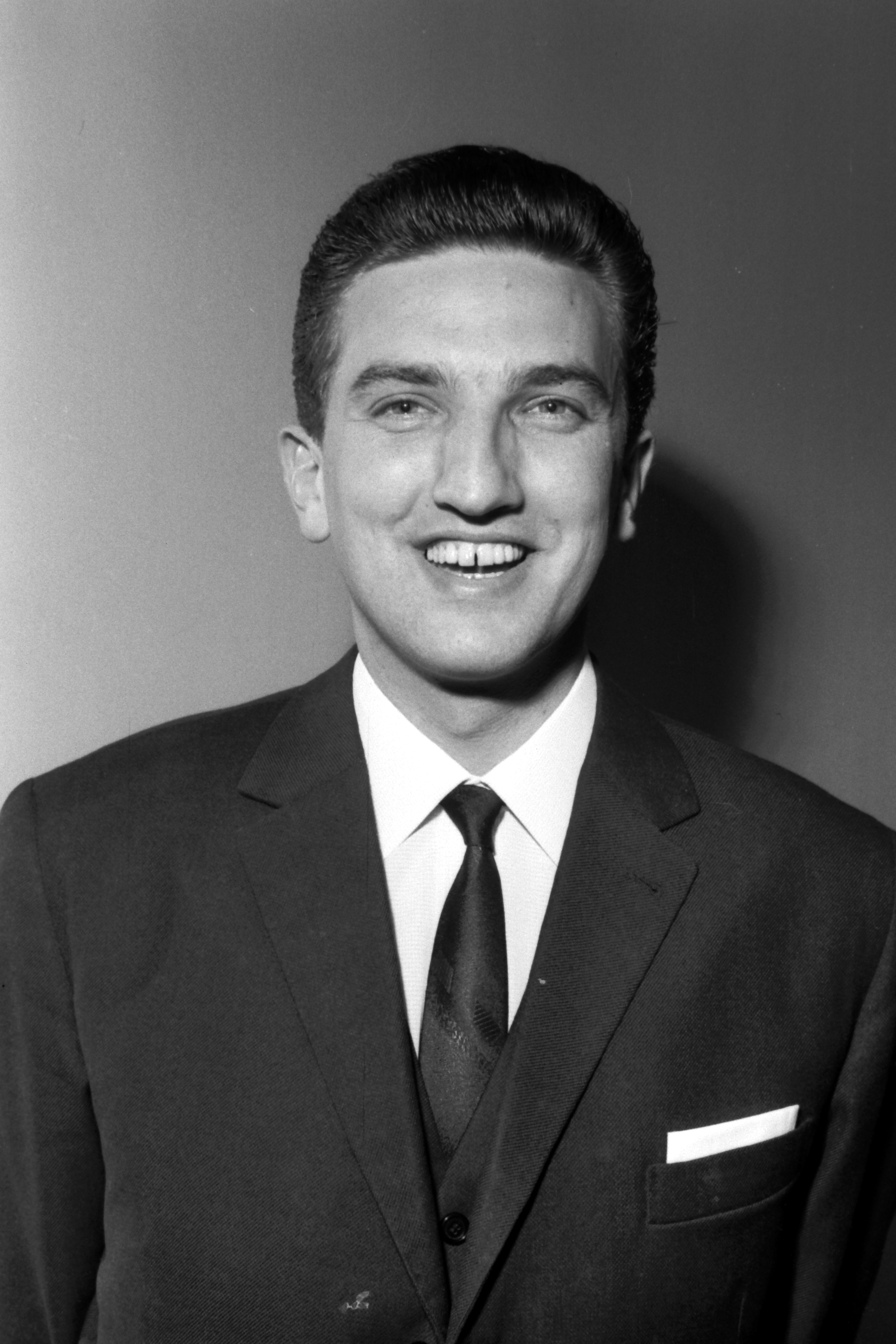
- Vukov in 1964
- Born: Vinko Vukov; 3 August 1936; Šibenik, Kingdom of Yugoslavia
- Died: 24 September 2008 (aged 72); Zagreb, Croatia
- Occupations: Singer; politician
- Years active: 1959–1972; 1989–2005
- Political party: Croatian People's Party (until 1997); Social Democratic Party (1999–2005)
- Spouse: Diana Bulat (m. 1961)
- Children: 2
- Musical career
- Genres: Pop
- Instrument: Vocals

Vinko "Vice" Vukov (3 August 1936 – 24 September 2008) was a Croatian singer and politician.

== Biography ==
Vukov was born in Šibenik. In 1959, he achieved instant fame by winning the Opatija Music Festival in his singing debut, with the song "Mirno teku rijeke" (Rivers Are Calmly Flowing). During the 1960s, he was one of the most popular singers in Yugoslavia, appearing at the Eurovision Song Contest 1963 with the song "Brodovi" (Ships) and at the Eurovision Song Contest 1965 with the song "Čežnja" (Longing).

In the aftermath of the 1971 Croatian Spring movement, he was branded a Croatian nationalist by Yugoslav authorities and had his apartment searched by the police during the 1972 wave of arrests of Croatian Spring leaders. Vukov was touring Australia at the time. His wife warned him not to return to Yugoslavia to avoid arrest, so instead he went to Paris where he lived with his parents-in-law, returning to Yugoslavia four years later in 1976. By that time, the authorities had lost interest in his case, but his singing career was effectively over; he was blacklisted, barred from performing publicly and all his records were pulled out of stores.

In 1978, he graduated from the University of Zagreb's Faculty of Humanities and Social Sciences (FFZG) majoring in philosophy and Italian.

In 1989, an album of his new songs, albeit without his name on the cover, reappeared in Croatian music stores, signalling the political change. Later that same year, Vukov made a public comeback with a series of 14 sold-out concerts at the Vatroslav Lisinski Concert Hall in Zagreb.

Vukov is best remembered for recording some of the most popular lyrical Croatian patriotic songs, including "Zvona moga grada" (The Bells of My City), "Hrvatski kraj" (Croatian Place), "Svijet je velik" (The World is Big), and "Tvoja zemlja" (Your Country).

After the first multi-party election in Croatia and the country's independence in 1991, Vukov became a prominent supporter of the opposition Social Democratic Party (SDP). During this time, due to his fallout with President Franjo Tuđman whom he had been close with, Vukov was banned from Croatian Radiotelevision. Vukov ran several times for a seat in the Croatian Parliament, finally succeeding as an independent candidate on the SDP party ticket in 2003.

On 17 November 2005, while descending the stairs in the Parliament building, Vukov slipped and fell, sustaining a serious head injury. He was hospitalised and underwent surgery, but fell into a coma shortly afterwards. In March 2006, according to his doctors, he was in a persistent vegetative state with no chance of recovery. However, in November 2007, Vukov was reported as being conscious at times, aware of his surroundings, and his condition was described as stable. He died in Zagreb in September 2008 aged 72.

Preceded by Lola Novaković	Yugoslavia in the Eurovision Song Contest; 1963	Succeeded by Sabahudin Kurt
Preceded by Sabahudin Kurt	Yugoslavia in the Eurovision Song Contest; 1965	Succeeded by Berta Ambrož
