= José Guardiola =

Spanish singer (1930–2012)

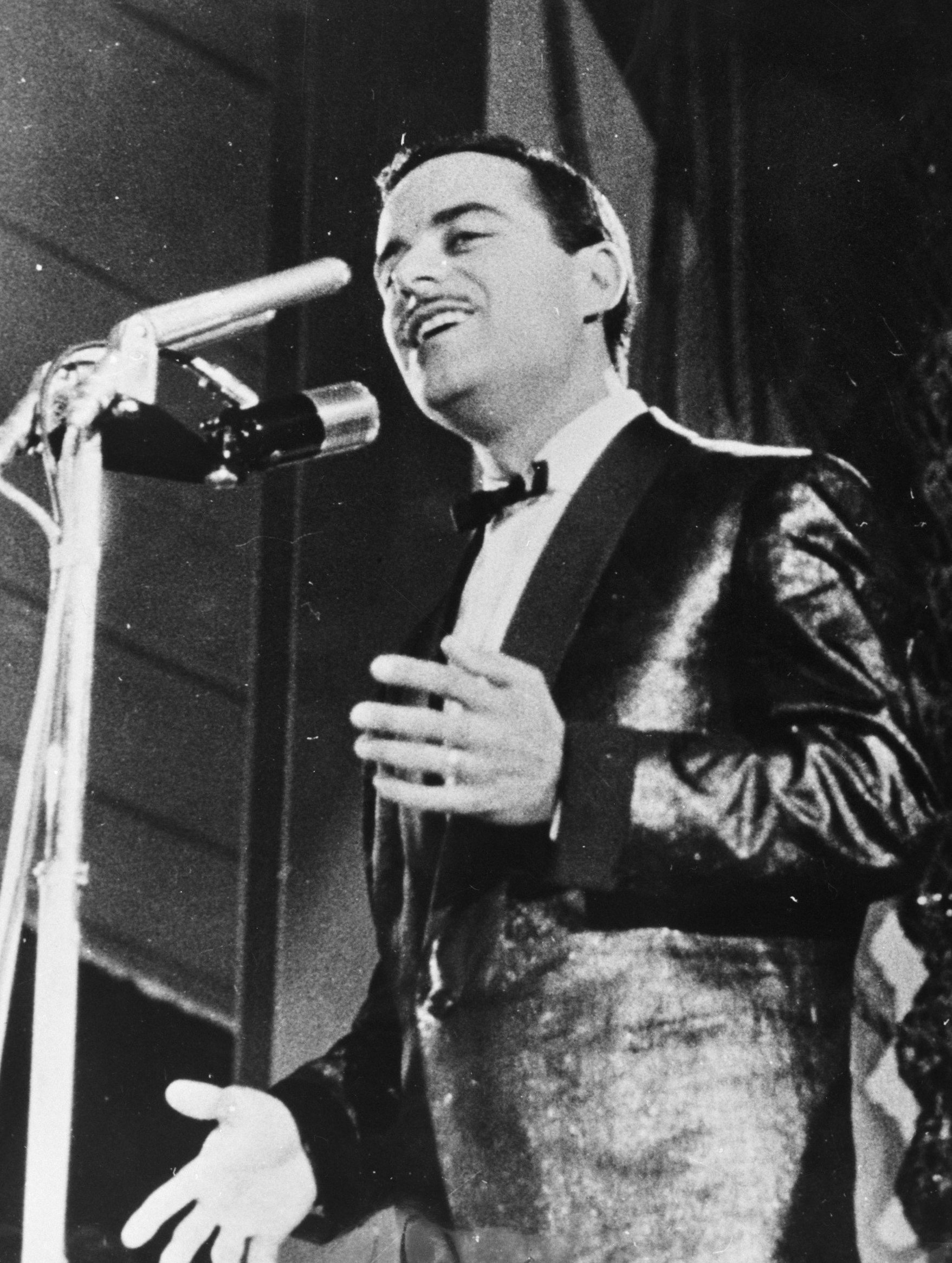
- Eurovision Song Contest 1963 in London
- Born: José Guardiola Díaz de Rada; 22 October 1930; Barcelona, Spain
- Died: 9 April 2012 (aged 81); Barcelona, Spain
- Occupation: Singer

José Guardiola Díaz de Rada (22 October 1930 – 9 April 2012) was a Spanish singer of popular music who sang in Spanish and Catalan. He represented Spain in the Eurovision Song Contest 1963.

Guardiola was born in Barcelona. He performed and recorded mostly Spanish versions of foreign songs and reached his maximum fame in Spain and Latin America in the early 1960s with versions of songs like "Sixteen Tons", "Mack the Knife" and "Ya Mustafa". He was known as the Spanish Crooner due to his style and the types of songs he sang.

On 23 March 1963, he represented Spain in the Eurovision Song Contest 1963 with the song "Algo prodigioso", placing 12th. At that time he also sang a few songs with his infant daughter. He retired in 2008.

== Discography ==
- Navidad EP with the Hermanas Serrano

Preceded by Víctor Balaguer with "Llámame"	Spain in the Eurovision Song Contest; 1963	Succeeded by Los TNT with "Caracola"
