= Ray Adams (singer) =

Norwegian singer (1931–2003)

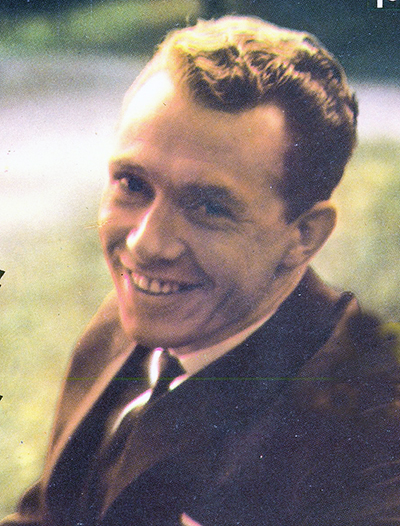
Ray Adams on EP-cover 1963

Ragnar Asbjørnsen (22 March 1931 – 4 August 2003), who recorded under the name Ray Adams, was a Norwegian singer. He had a number of hit songs in Norway and other European countries, starting with "Violetta" in 1961, which sold 300,000 copies in Europe. Other hit songs included "De tusen sjöars land", "Jag har bott vid en landsväg" and "Delilah".

== Biography ==
During the 1950s Asbjørnsen was a vocalist in several dance orchestras. He first took the stage name Ray Adams in 1961 when he was launched in England. He broke through with the song Violetta, which became a bestseller both in Sweden and abroad. He recorded over 400 melodies in five different languages. Besides Norway and Sweden, he achieved some success in England, Italy, Germany, the United States, Philippines and New Zealand.

He was one of the truly great folkpark artists of the 1960s with the record summer of 1962 when he appeared in over 180 venues. However, the tour was big even after this, with often up to 120 different places in a folk park summer. Ray Adams had hits on Svenkstoppen, Kvällstoppen, Tio i Topp and Radio Nord's top list. He also appeared in krog shows, including as a participant in the hit Hallå där with Anita Lindblom and Tjadden Hällström, which was played at Berns salonger in Stockholm, Restaurant Lorensberg in Gothenburg and Hotel Kramer in Malmö in 1969. Ray Adams represented Norway in the Schlagerfestival der Ostseestaaten in Rostock in both 1969 and 1970, where he came 1st and 2nd respectively. These winning melodies were released on a compilation LP in 1972 on the then East German company Amiga. When Norsktoppen started in 1973, he was one of the first on the list with "Milaja".

From 1975 it was mostly the own dry cleaning at home in Oslo that occupied Ray Adams' time. In 1982 he settled in Uddevalla where he opened a salad bar. In 1985, after 10 years, he made a comeback on record, now on the LP Skattkistan, which he recorded together with the singer Anna-Lena Löfgren. As late as 1987, he was on Svensktoppen with the melody "Let us help each other". During this period, Ray Adams also collaborated with, among others, the dance orchestra Pelles.

In later years he toured with accordion player Allan Lewin and pianist Rolf Hult, among others. He also made bigger appearances, including with Bohuslän Big Band, Anna-Lena Löfgren and up to and including 2002 in the show "Minnenas Melodier" together with singer Christer Peters. Just in time for his 70th birthday in 2001, he published the autobiography Hör min sång – the book about Ray Adams, written by Ingmar Norlén. Ray Adams was also engaged as a host at Sveriges Radio in Uddevalla, where he also sang evergreens and other songs in the program Sladdlöst. His last performance was in December 2002 at a charity concert in Uddevalla church for the benefit of homeless people. He died of leukemia in August 2003. He is buried in the Sigelhult cemetery in Uddevalla.
