= Finland in the Eurovision Song Contest 1963 =

- Eurovision Song Contest 1963
- Participating broadcaster: Yleisradio (Yle)
- Country: Finland
- Selection process: Song: National final Artist: Internal selection
- Selection date: 14 February 1963

Competing entry
- Song: "Muistojeni laulu"
- Artist: Laila Halme
- Songwriters: Börje Sundgren

Placement
- Final result: 13th, 0 points

Participation chronology

Finland was represented at the Eurovision Song Contest 1963 with the song "Muistojeni laulu", written by Börje Sundgren, and performed by Laila Halme. The Finnish participating broadcaster, Yleisradio (Yle), selected its entry through a national final and, subsequently, the performer internally once the national final was over.

In the national final, held on 14 February 1963, "Muistojeni laulu" was performed once with Marjatta Leppänen and once with Irmeli Mäkelä. After the final Yle organized an extra singing test to find the best vocalist for the song. Laila Halme, who originally had finished third with Tamara Lund in the national final, was chosen as the performer on 19 February 1963.

== Before Eurovision ==
=== National final ===
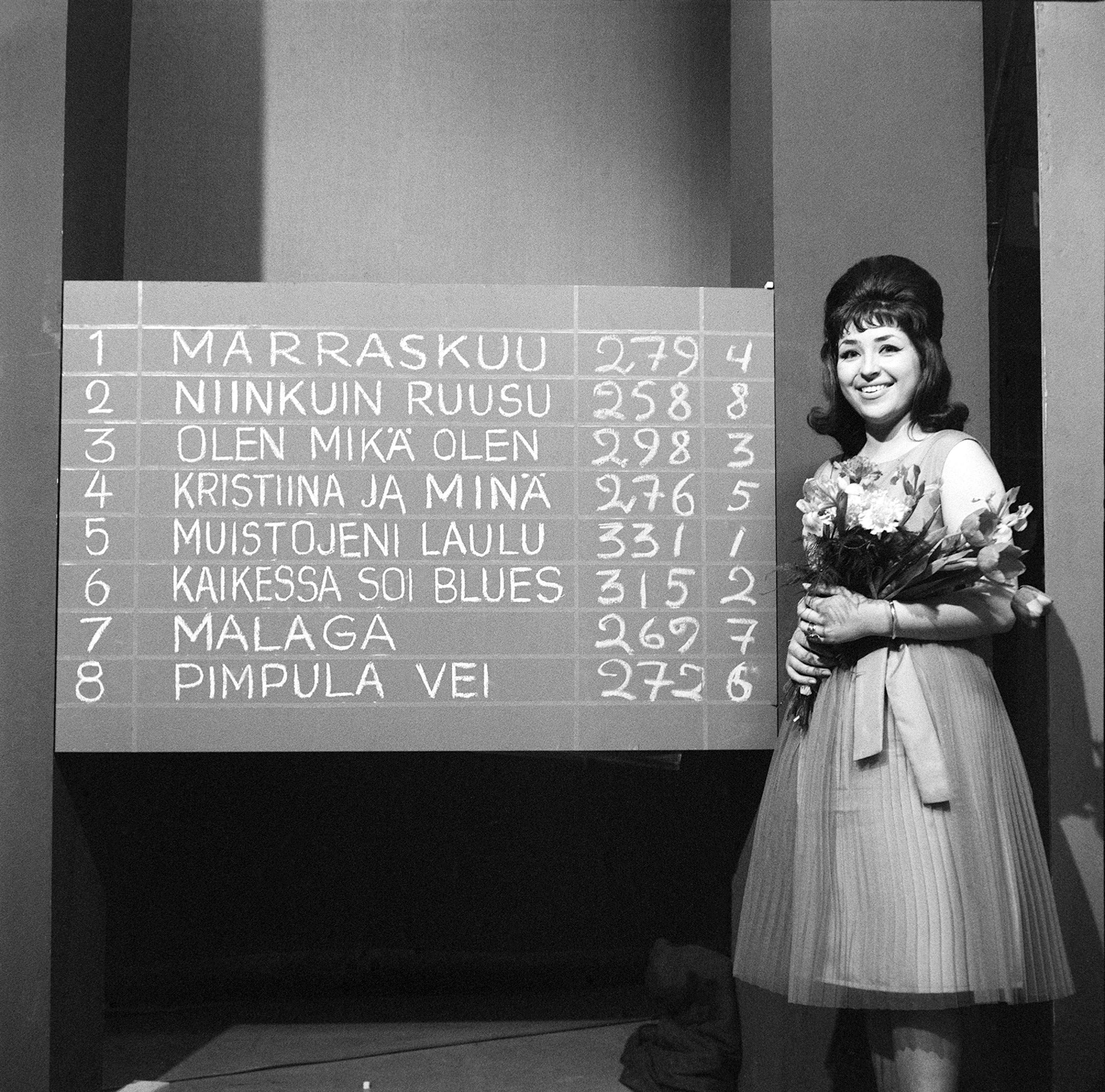
Irmeli Mäkelä next to the scoreboard

Eight entries were selected for the competition from 200 received submissions. Yleisradio (Yle) held the national final on 14 February 1963 at its studios in Helsinki, hosted by Aarno Walli, Erkki-Mikael, Risto Vanari, and Marion Rung. The eight songs were performed twice, once with a small combo and once with a full orchestra. The winner was chosen by a jury consisting of 40 members.

Final – 14 February 1963
R/O	Artist 1 (Combo)	Artist 2 (Orchestra)	Song	Songwriter(s)	Points	Place
1	Seija Lampila	Rauni Pekkala	"Marraskuu"	Lasse Mårtenson; Margareta Mutreich	279	4
2	Pärre Förars	Stig Fransman	"Niin kuin ruusu"	Laura Railo	258	8
3	Tamara Lund	Laila Halme	"Olen mikä olen"	Jorma Panula; Sauvo Puhtila	298	3
4	Lasse Liemola	Matti Heinivaho	"Kristiina ja minä"	Toivo Kärki; Reino Helismaa	276	5
5	Marjatta Leppänen	Irmeli Mäkelä	"Muistojeni laulu"	Börje Sundgren	331	1
6	Lasse Mårtenson	Johnny Forsell	"Kaikessa soi blues"	Toivo Kärki; Reino Helismaa	315	2
7	Maynie Sirén	Tapio Lahtinen	"Malaga"	Nils Lerche; Erkki Aunamo	269	7
8	Erkki Liikanen	Tuulevi Mattila	"Pimpula vei"	Åke Granholm	272	6

== At Eurovision ==
On the night of the final Halme performed 7th in the running order, following Italy and preceding eventual contest winners Denmark. Voting was by each national jury awarding 5-4-3-2-1 to their top five songs, and at the close "Muistojeni laulu" was one of four songs (along with the entries from the Netherlands, Norway, and Sweden) which had failed to pick up any points at all, the country's first last place finish. The Finnish jury awarded its 5 points to Denmark.

=== Voting ===
Finland did not receive any points at the Eurovision Song Contest 1963.

Points awarded by Finland
Score	Country
5 points	Denmark
4 points	Austria
3 points	United Kingdom
2 points	Italy
1 point	Luxembourg
