= Eurovision Song Contest 1963 =

International song competition

Date and venue
- Final: 23 March 1963
- Venue: BBC Television Centre; London, United Kingdom

Organisation
- Organiser: European Broadcasting Union (EBU)
- Scrutineer: Miroslav Vilček

Production
- Host broadcaster: British Broadcasting Corporation (BBC)
- Director: Yvonne Littlewood
- Executive producer: Harry Carlisle
- Musical director: Eric Robinson
- Presenter: Katie Boyle

Participants
- Number of entries: 16
- Participation map: Participating countries

Vote
- Voting system: Each country awarded 5-1 points to their five favourite songs
- Winning song: Denmark "Dansevise"

The Eurovision Song Contest 1963 was the eighth edition of the Eurovision Song Contest, held on Saturday 23 March 1963 at the BBC Television Centre in London, United Kingdom, and presented by Katie Boyle for a second time. It was organised by the European Broadcasting Union (EBU) and host broadcaster the British Broadcasting Corporation (BBC), who staged the event after Radiodiffusion-Télévision Française (RTF), which had won the 1962 contest for France, declined hosting responsibilities due to financial shortcomings, and as it had staged the competition in 1959 and 1961.

Broadcasters from sixteen countries participated in the contest, the same countries that had also participated the previous two years.

The winner was Denmark with the song "Dansevise", performed by Grethe and Jørgen Ingmann. This was the first victory for any of the Nordic countries. Switzerland finished second - just two points behind, the closest finish up to this point. Italy, the United Kingdom and France (in joint fifth with Monaco) rounded out the top five. Four countries got nul points, with Finland, Norway and Sweden failing to score any points for the first time and the Netherlands for the second time, becoming the first country to go two years in a row without scoring a single point.

== Location ==
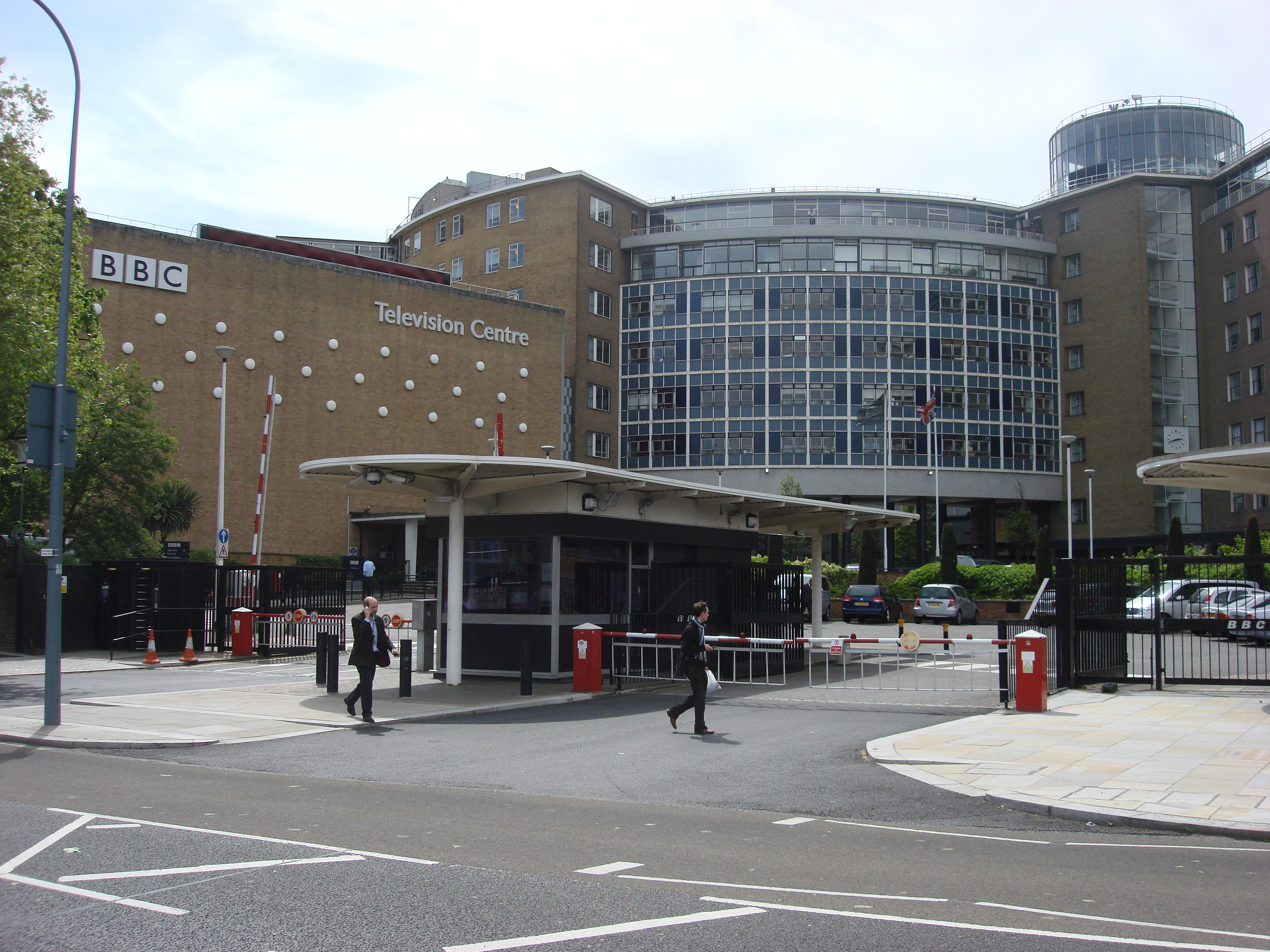
BBC Television Centre, London - host venue of the 1963 contest.

The British Broadcasting Corporation (BBC) was willing to host the contest instead of the previous year's winner France's Radiodiffusion-Télévision Française (RTF), as was the case in 1960. They would do so again in 1972, 1974, and 2023 because the winning broadcasters of the previous year declined to produce the contest. The host venue was the BBC Television Centre, White City, London, which opened in 1960. It is one of the most readily recognisable facilities of its type having appeared as the backdrop for many BBC programmes. It remained one of the largest broadcasting facilities in the world until the property was redeveloped in March 2013.

== Participants ==
Eurovision Song Contest 1963 – Participation summaries by country
- Austria; Belgium; Denmark; Finland; France; Germany; Italy; Luxembourg; Monaco; Netherlands; Norway; Spain; Sweden; Switzerland; United Kingdom; Yugoslavia

All countries which participated in the 1962 edition also participated in the 1963 edition.

Only one of the performing artists had previously competed representing the same country in past editions: Ronnie Carroll had represented the United Kingdom in 1962.

Eurovision Song Contest 1963 participants
Country	Broadcaster	Artist	Song	Language	Songwriter(s)	Conductor
Austria	ORF	Carmela Corren	"Vielleicht geschieht ein Wunder"	German, English	Erwin Halletz; Norman Newell; Peter Wehle	Erwin Halletz
Belgium	BRT	Jacques Raymond	"Waarom?"	Dutch	Wim Brabants; Hans Flower	Francis Bay
Denmark	DR	Grethe and Jørgen Ingmann	"Dansevise"	Danish	Otto Francker; Sejr Volmer-Sørensen	Kai Mortensen
Finland	YLE	Laila Halme	"Muistojeni laulu"	Finnish	Börje Sundgren	George de Godzinsky
France	RTF	Alain Barrière	"Elle était si jolie"	French	Alain Barrière	Franck Pourcel
Germany	HR (Note: On behalf of the German public broadcasting consortium ARD)	Heidi Brühl	"Marcel"	German	Charly Niessen	Willy Berking
Italy	RAI	Emilio Pericoli	"Uno per tutte"	Italian	Giulio Rapetti; Tony Renis; Alberto Testa	Gigi Cichellero
Luxembourg	CLT	Nana Mouskouri	"À force de prier"	French	Raymond Bernard; Pierre Delanoë	Eric Robinson
Monaco	TMC	Françoise Hardy	"L'amour s'en va"	French	Françoise Hardy	Raymond Lefèvre
Netherlands	NTS	Annie Palmen	"Een speeldoos"	Dutch	Pieter Goemans	Eric Robinson
Norway	NRK	Anita Thallaug	"Solhverv"	Norwegian	Dag Kristoffersen	Øivind Bergh
Spain	TVE	José Guardiola	"Algo prodigioso"	Spanish	Fernando García Morcillo; Camillo Murillo Janero	Rafael Ibarbia
Sweden	SR	Monica Zetterlund	"En gång i Stockholm"	Swedish	Bobbie Ericson; Beppe Wolgers	William Lind
Switzerland	SRG SSR	Esther Ofarim	"T'en va pas"	French	Émile Gardaz; Géo Voumard	Eric Robinson
United Kingdom	BBC	Ronnie Carroll	"Say Wonderful Things"	English	Philip Green; Norman Newell	Eric Robinson
Yugoslavia	JRT	Vice Vukov	"Brodovi" (Бродови)	Serbo-Croatian	Mario Nardelli	Miljenko Prohaska

== Production and format ==
The production mode was unusual in comparison with other Eurovision Song Contests: In contrast to most previous and following editions which were filmed in concert halls or theatres, the staging of 1963 was done in television studios. Two studios (TC3 and TC4) were used: one for the mistress of ceremonies Katie Boyle, the audience, and the scoreboard (TC3); the other for the performers and the orchestra accompanying them (TC4). Unusually, a boom microphone (normally used for drama and comedy shows) was employed – the viewer could not see this, so it appeared as if the artists were miming to their vocals. This was not the case, but this innovation was to create a new look for the contest. The use of television studios allowed a broader variety of staging elements not seen before in the contest, and the use of close-ups so to create an atmosphere of intimacy for television viewers.

After the 1962 edition was the only one to be held on a Sunday, the contest was held on a Saturday again in 1963.

== Contest overview ==
Results of the Eurovision Song Contest 1963
R/O	Country	Artist	Song	Points	Place
1	United Kingdom	Ronnie Carroll	"Say Wonderful Things"	28	4
2	Netherlands	Annie Palmen	"Een speeldoos"	0	13
3	Germany	Heidi Brühl	"Marcel"	5	9
4	Austria	Carmela Corren	"Vielleicht geschieht ein Wunder"	16	7
5	Norway	Anita Thallaug	"Solhverv"	0	13
6	Italy	Emilio Pericoli	"Uno per tutte"	37	3
7	Finland	Laila Halme	"Muistojeni laulu"	0	13
8	Denmark	Grethe and Jørgen Ingmann	"Dansevise"	42	1
9	Yugoslavia	Vice Vukov	"Brodovi"	3	11
10	Switzerland	Esther Ofarim	"T'en va pas"	40	2
11	France	Alain Barrière	"Elle était si jolie"	25	5
12	Spain	José Guardiola	"Algo prodigioso"	2	12
13	Sweden	Monica Zetterlund	"En gång i Stockholm"	0	13
14	Belgium	Jacques Raymond	"Waarom?"	4	10
15	Monaco	Françoise Hardy	"L'amour s'en va"	25	5
16	Luxembourg	Nana Mouskouri	"À force de prier"	13	8

=== Spokespersons ===
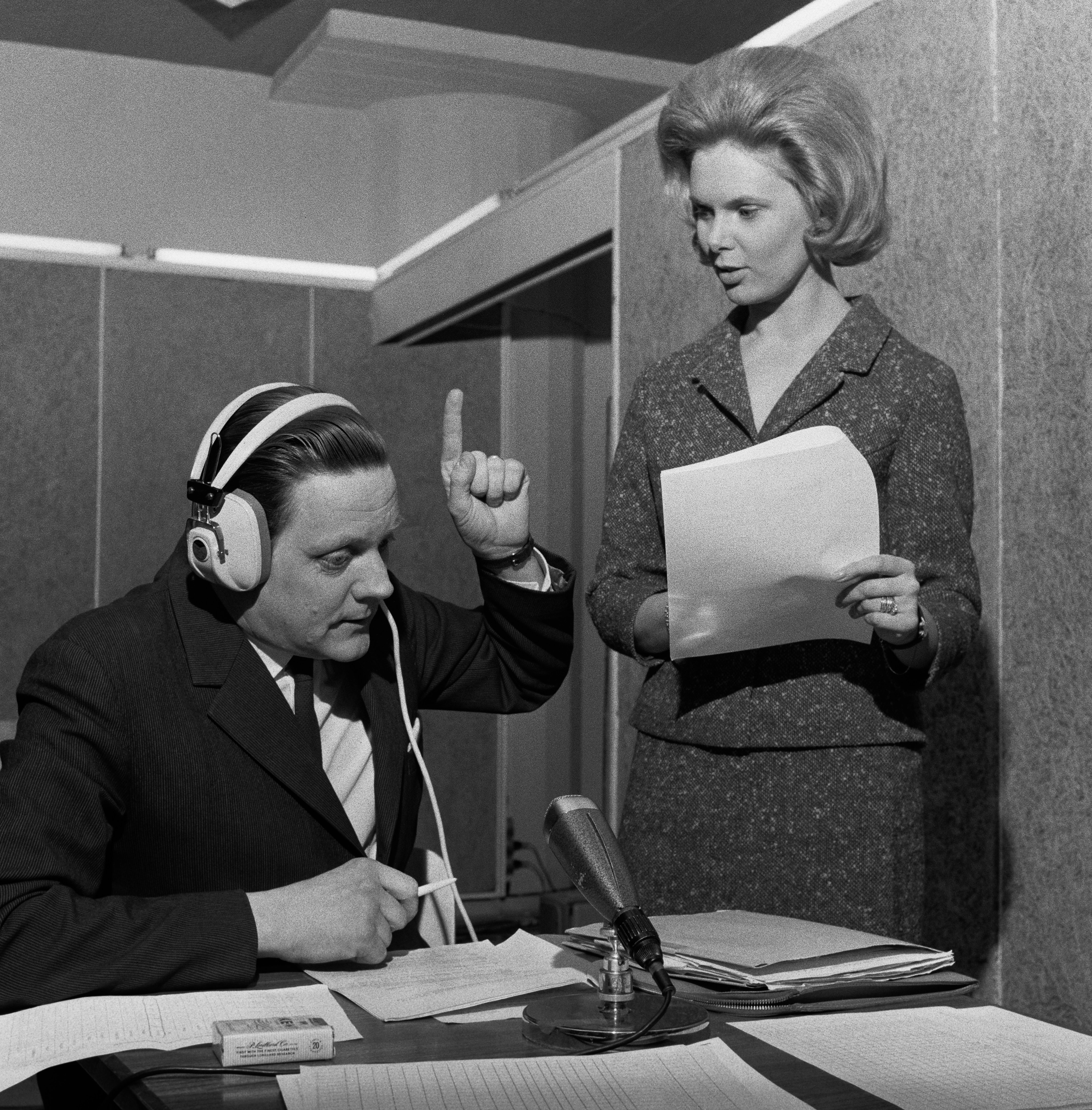
Poppe Berg announcing the points from Finland

Each participating broadcaster appointed a spokesperson who was responsible for announcing the votes for their respective country via telephone. Known spokespersons at the 1963 contest are listed below.

- Finland – Poppe Berg
- Sweden – Edvard Matz

== Detailed voting results ==
Each participating broadcaster assembled a 20-member jury panel who awarded their five favourite songs 5, 4, 3, 2, and 1 points in order. All those points would then be added up and the five songs with the most points got 5, 4, 3, 2, and 1 votes in order. Errors in the Norwegian (see below) and the Monegasque votes meant their scores had to be announced twice, with an adjustment to the scores being made in each case before the final score was verified.

One controversy this year was during the voting. When it was Norway's turn to announce their votes, the spokesman in Oslo did not use the correct procedure in that the song number, followed by the name of the country, should have been announced before awarding the points. Boyle asked Norway to repeat their results, but the Norwegian spokesman asked Boyle to return to them after all the other results were in. When Boyle went back to Norway again the votes had been altered, thus changing the outcome of the contest and giving the victory to Denmark at Switzerland's expense. In fact, the Norwegian spokesman had not given the correct votes on the first occasion, because votes from the 20 jury members were still being tallied. The Swiss participating broadcaster, SRG SSR, reportedly intended to appeal and following numerous complaints, checked the transmissions of the votes made. It was confirmed a month after the contest that the Norwegian jury didn't change their votes.

Monaco was also asked to repeat their voting a second time as initially Monaco gave one point to both the United Kingdom and Luxembourg. However, when Boyle went back to Monaco to receive the votes again Monaco's one vote to Luxembourg was efficiently discarded (although this did not have any effect on the positions of the countries).

Detailed voting results
		Total score	United Kingdom	Netherlands	Germany	Austria	Norway	Italy	Finland	Denmark	Yugoslavia	Switzerland	France	Spain	Sweden	Belgium	Monaco	Luxembourg
Contestants	United Kingdom	28		3			5		3	3	3		3	5	2		1	
Contestants	Netherlands	0																
Contestants	Germany	5					2										3	
Contestants	Austria	16	4						4	1			2		3	2		
Contestants	Norway	0																
Contestants	Italy	37	2	1			3		2	5	4	5		3		3	5	4
Contestants	Finland	0																
Contestants	Denmark	42	3	5	2	3	4	2	5			3			5	5		5
Contestants	Yugoslavia	3											1	2				
Contestants	Switzerland	40	5		4	5	1	5		4				4	1	4	4	3
Contestants	France	25		4	1	2		4			5	4		1		1	2	1
Contestants	Spain	2									2							
Contestants	Sweden	0																
Contestants	Belgium	4				4												
Contestants	Monaco	25	1	2	5	1		3			1	1	5		4			2
Contestants	Luxembourg	13			3			1	1	2		2	4					

=== 5 points ===
Below is a summary of all 5 points received:

N.	Contestant	Nation(s) giving 5 points
5	Denmark	Belgium, Finland, Luxembourg, Netherlands, Sweden
3	Italy	Denmark, Monaco, Switzerland
3	Switzerland	Austria, Italy, United Kingdom
2	United Kingdom	Norway, Spain
2	Monaco	France, Germany
1	France	Yugoslavia

== Broadcasts ==
Each participating broadcaster was required to relay the contest via its networks. Non-participating EBU member broadcasters were also able to relay the contest as "passive participants". Broadcasters were able to send commentators to provide coverage of the contest in their own native language and to relay information about the artists and songs to their television viewers. Reports estimate that 50 million people would see the contest.

Known details on the broadcasts in each country, including the specific broadcasting stations and commentators are shown in the tables below.

Broadcasters and commentators in participating countries
Country	Broadcaster	Channel(s)	Commentator(s)	Ref(s)
Austria	ORF	ORF	Hanns Joachim Friedrichs	
Belgium	BRT	BRT	Bob Boon and Denise Maes	
Belgium	RTB	RTB	Pierre Delhasse	
Denmark	DR	Danmarks Radio TV, Program 1	Ole Mortensen	
Finland	YLE	Suomen Televisio	Aarno Walli	
Finland	YLE	Yleisohjelma	Erkki Melakoski	
Finland	YLE	Ruotsinkielinen yleisohjelma	Jan Sederholm	
France	RTF	RTF	Pierre Tchernia	
Germany	ARD	Deutsches Fernsehen	Hanns Joachim Friedrichs	
Italy	RAI	Programma Nazionale TV	Renato Tagliani	
Luxembourg	CLT	Télé-Luxembourg	Pierre Tchernia	
Monaco	Télé Monte-Carlo		Pierre Tchernia	
Netherlands	NTS	NTS	Willem Duys	
Netherlands	VARA	Hilversum 1	Coen Serré	
Norway	NRK	NRK Fjernsynet, NRK	Øivind Johnssen	
Spain	TVE	TVE	Federico Gallo	
Spain	RNE	RNE (Note: Deferred broadcast at 23:00 (CET))		
Sweden	SR	Sveriges TV, SR P1	Jörgen Cederberg	
Switzerland	SRG SSR	TV DRS	Theodor Haller	
Switzerland	SRG SSR	TSR	Georges Hardy	
Switzerland	SRG SSR	TSI	Renato Tagliani	
Switzerland	SRG SSR	Radio Beromünster (Note: Delayed broadcast on 25 March at 20:00 (CET))		
Switzerland	SRG SSR	Radio Sottens		
Switzerland	SRG SSR	Radio Monte Ceneri		
United Kingdom	BBC	BBC TV	David Jacobs	
Yugoslavia	JRT	Televizija Beograd, Televizija Ljubljana, Televizija Zagreb	Saša Novak	

Broadcasters and commentators in non-participating countries
Country	Broadcaster	Channel(s)	Commentator(s)	Ref(s)
Ireland	RÉ	Telefís Éireann		
Portugal	RTP	RTP	Federico Gallo	
