= Jørgen Ingmann =

Danish jazz and pop guitarist (1925–2015)

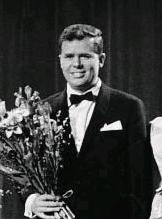
- Ingmann in 1963

Background information
- Birth name: Jørgen Ingmann Pedersen
- Born: 26 April 1925; Copenhagen, Denmark
- Died: 21 March 2015 (aged 89); Holte, Denmark
- Occupation: Musician
- Years active: 1944–1984

Jørgen Ingmann (born Jørgen Ingmann Pedersen; 26 April 1925 – 21 March 2015) was a Danish jazz and pop guitarist from Copenhagen. He was popular in Europe and had a wider international hit in 1961 with his version of "Apache". He and his wife Grethe Ingmann won the 1963 Eurovision Song Contest with the song "Dansevise".

== Career ==
Jørgen Ingmann Pedersen was born in Copenhagen, and first performed as a guitarist with Svend Asmussen, the jazz violinist, during the 1940s and early 1950s, in a group known as the Unmelancholy Danes.

He was influenced by American guitarist and recording studio pioneer Les Paul. In the mid-1950s he set up his own studio where he developed techniques of multi-tracking and distortion, using his own accompaniment on bass and drums, and began recording under the name Jørgen Ingmann & His Guitar.

Under this name he recorded a version of "Apache" in the fall of 1960; "Apache" was originally recorded in June 1960 by the British group the Shadows. Ingmann's cover version charted in 1961 at #1 in Canada on the CHUM Chart, #2 in the United States on the Billboard pop singles chart, #9 on the Billboard R&B chart, #4 on Cashbox, and #6 in Germany.

He remade Silvana Mangano's "Anna" with moderate US chart success. In the first half of the 1960s he had many hits in Germany, including "Pepe" (1961 #15), "Anna" (1961 #19), "Violetta" (1962 #16), "Drina Marsch" (1964 #5) and "Zorba le Grec" (1965 #14).

Billboard magazine reported that he charted at no. 2 on the Denmark pop singles chart with his recording of "Marchen Til Drina" on 7 December 1963. His recording reached no. 1 on 17 December 1963. Other recordings of his included "Tequila" (which he also recorded during the 60s, with the Champs) and a version of Pinetop Perkins' "Pinetop's Boogie Woogie" (from 1962).

He also worked as a member of the duet, Grethe og Jørgen Ingmann, together with his wife Grethe Ingmann. After winning the Dansk Melodi Grand Prix competition in 1963, they went on to represent Denmark at the Eurovision Song Contest 1963 where they won with the song "Dansevise" (Dance Ballad), music by Otto Francker and lyrics by Sejr Volmer-Sørensen. His best jazz work is to be found on the LP Guitar in Hifi which, apart from "Margie", the first track, has many songs written by Hoagy Carmichael. It was issued in England on a 10-inch LP and in other places as a 12-inch LP. In the USA it was called Jorgan Ingmann Swings Softly.

== Personal life and death ==
He and Grethe met in 1955, married in 1956, and divorced in 1975. They remarried in the 1980s. Grethe Ingmann died 18 August 1990 from cancer, age 52. Jørgen Ingmann died on 21 March 2015, aged 89.

Awards and achievements
Preceded by Ellen Winther with "Vuggevise"	Denmark in the Eurovision Song Contest; 1963	Succeeded by Bjørn Tidmand with "Sangen om dig"
Preceded by (France) Isabelle Aubret with "Un premier amour"	Winner of the Eurovision Song Contest; 1963	Succeeded by (Italy) Gigliola Cinquetti with "Non ho l'età"
