= Grethe Ingmann =

Danish singer

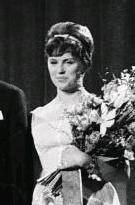
- Grethe Ingmann at the Dansk Melodi Grand Prix, 1963

Background information
- Birth name: Grethe Clemmensen
- Born: 17 June 1938; Copenhagen, Denmark
- Died: 18 August 1990 (aged 52); Frederikssund, Denmark
- Occupation: Singer

Grethe Ingmann (born Clemmensen; 17 June 1938 – 18 August 1990) was a Danish singer.

She started her career at 17, when she temporarily performed as a singer of the Malihini Hawaiians pop quartet. Soon after she sang with the Danish guitarist Jørn Grauengaard and his trio.

In 1955 she met her future husband, guitarist Jørgen Ingmann. The couple married in 1956 and performed as the duo Grethe og Jørgen Ingmann. Together they won the Eurovision Song Contest 1963 representing Denmark with the jazz waltz "Dansevise" (Dancing tune) with music by Otto Francker and lyrics by Sejr Volmer-Sørensen. It was the first entry performed by a duo to win the Contest and also the first Scandinavian winner.

In 1965 she entered the German Schlager Contest with the song "Sommerwind". She dropped out in the preliminaries, but the song's English version, written by Johnny Mercer in 1966 and sung by Frank Sinatra, became an international hit.

Grethe and Jørgen Ingmann continued their musical career until they divorced in 1975. As a solo singer, Grethe participated in several Danish pre-selections for the Eurovision Song Contest, unsuccessfully. Notably, in 1979 she entered the Dansk Melodi Grand Prix with Bjarne Liller and the song "Alt er skønt", which tied for equal first at the end of the voting but placed second after a re-vote.

The couple remarried in the 1980s. Grethe died of liver cancer on 18 August 1990, aged 52, becoming the first Eurovision winner to die.

Awards and achievements
| Preceded by Ellen Winther with "Vuggevise" | Denmark in the Eurovision Song Contest; 1963 | Succeeded by Bjørn Tidmand with "Sangen om dig" |
| Preceded by (France) Isabelle Aubret with "Un premier amour" | Winner of the Eurovision Song Contest; 1963 | Succeeded by (Italy) Gigliola Cinquetti with "Non ho l'età" |
