= Annie Palmen =

Dutch singer (1926–2000)

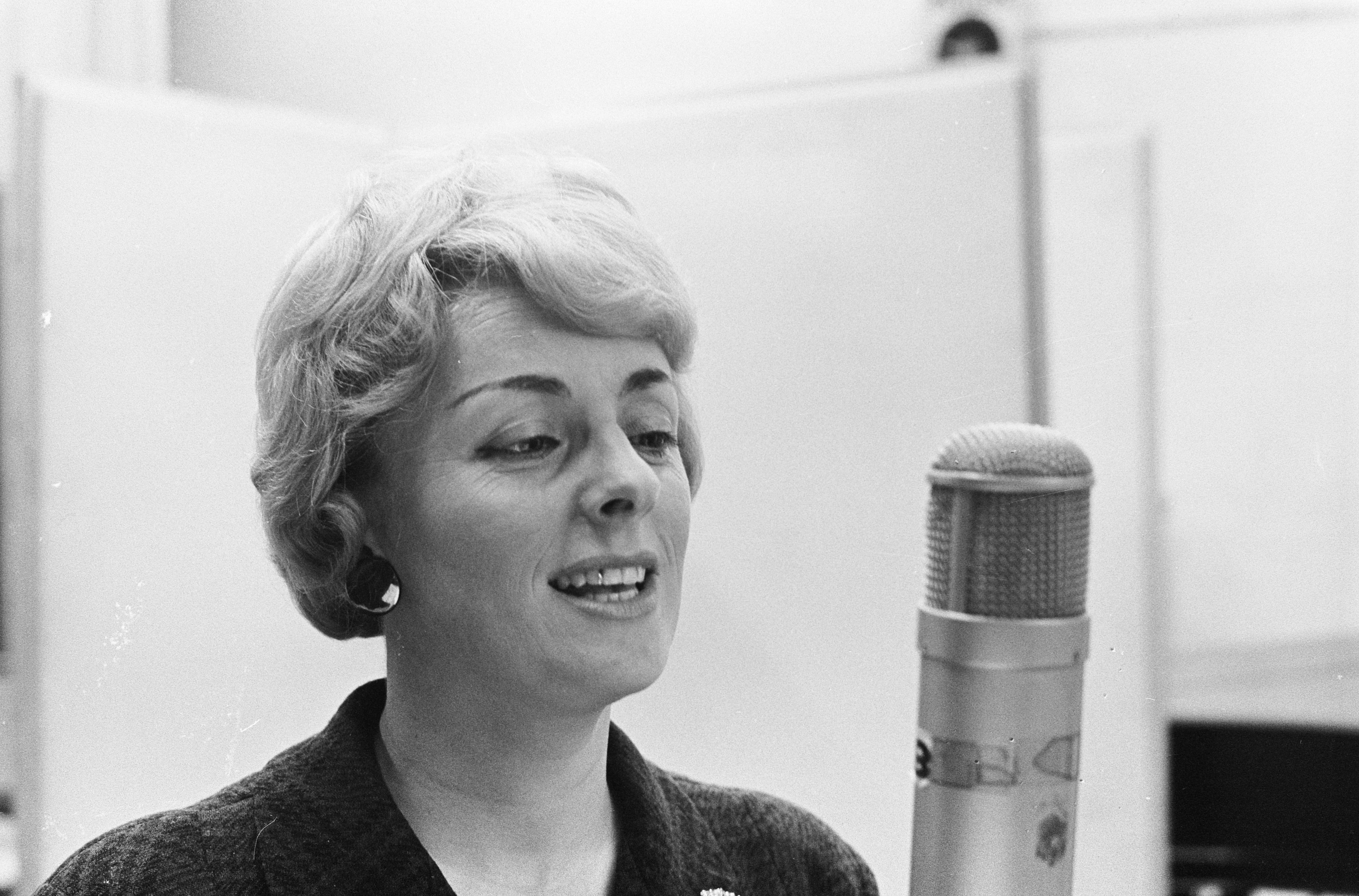
- Annie Palmen recording her Eurovision entry "Een Speeldoos" in Hilversum

Background information
- Born: Anna Maria Palmen; 19 August 1926
- Origin: IJmuiden, Netherlands
- Died: 15 January 2000 (aged 73)
- Genres: Pop
- Occupation: Singer

Annie Palmen (born Anna Maria Palmen; 19 August 1926 – 15 January 2000) was a Dutch singer. She represented the Netherlands in the Eurovision Song Contest 1963.

== Early career ==
Palmen was born in IJmuiden. She started her career singing with dance orchestras around the city of Haarlem, then sang on various radio stations before her first hit record, "Ik zal je nooit meer vergeten", in 1958.

== Eurovision Song Contest ==
In 1960, Palmen took part in the Dutch Eurovision selection, with the song "Wat een geluk" ("What luck"). In a somewhat odd selection process, each of eight songs was performed twice by different artists and a public vote chose the best song. A professional jury then decided which of the two artists would take the song to Eurovision. "Wat een geluk" was duly chosen as the song, but in the head-to-head with Rudi Carrell, Palmen lost out.

Palmen returned in 1963 in a more straightforward procedure, performing three songs from which a professional jury would pick a winner. The song "Geen ander" ("Nobody Else") was chosen to go to the Eurovision Song Contest 1963, held in London on 23 March. Before the contest however, the lyrics to the song were completely rewritten, and it became "Een speeldoos" ("A Musical Box"). From a field of 16, "Een speeldoos" was one of four songs (the others being the entries from Finland, Norway and Sweden) which failed to score. This was the Netherlands' second successive 'nul points' showing, following that of De Spelbrekers the previous year.

== Later career ==
In 1967, Palmen became a featured singer with the Boertjes van Buuten orchestra (Boertjes van Buuten is a hypocorism for Little farmers from outside towns) on the monthly television programme Mik for channel KRO, playing the role of Drika. This was a success and raised her profile. However, after the cancellation of Mik in 1972, Palmen dropped out of sight.

== Death ==
Palmen died in Beverwijk on 15 January 2000, after a long illness of an undisclosed nature, aged 73.

== Discography ==
Singles

- 1958: "De dokter heeft gezegd"
- 1958: "Ik zal je nooit meer vergeten"
- 1958: "Laat pa het maar doen"
- 1958: "Piero"
- 1959: "De zilvren maan van Maratonga"
- 1959: "Wat fijn kapitein"
- 1960: "Sailor"
- 1960: "Wat een geluk"
- 1963: "Een speeldoos"
- 1963: "Waarom laat je mij alleen"
- 1964: "Ga naar Bombay, ga naar Rio"
- 1964: "Ich tanze mit dir (in den Himmel hinein)"
- 1965: "Speel nog eenmaal voor mij Habanero"

Awards and achievements
Preceded by De Spelbrekers with "Katinka"	Netherlands in the Eurovision Song Contest; 1963	Succeeded by Anneke Grönloh with "Jij bent mijn leven"
