= Emilio Pericoli =

Italian singer (1928–2013)

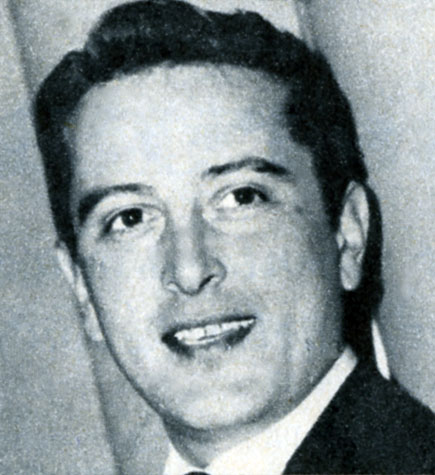

Background information
- Born: 7 January 1928; Cesenatico, Romagna, Italy
- Died: 9 April 2013 (aged 85) Savignano sul Rubicone, Romagna, Italy
- Occupation: Singer

Emilio Pericoli (7 January 1928 – 9 April 2013) was an Italian singer. He was born in Cesenatico, Romagna, Italy.

Pericoli's success was closely tied to the Sanremo Festival. He recorded a cover version of the song, "Al di là", by festival winner Betty Curtis. The song was an international success, hitting the charts in the U.S. (No. 3 AC, No. 6 Pop) and No. 30 in UK. It sold over one million copies, and was awarded a gold disc.

In 1962, Pericoli entered the festival himself. Together with composer Tony Renis he sang the ballad "Quando, quando, quando", featured in the movie The Easy Life, which initially failed to chart, but later became one of the best-known Italian hits.

A year later, Pericoli returned to San Remo with Renis again, with the song "Uno per tutte". He placed among the winners, and won a spot in the 1963 Eurovision Song Contest, where he came third, behind the winners Grethe and Jorgen Ingmann and runner-up Esther Ofarim.

He died in Savignano sul Rubicone, aged 85.

== Partial filmography ==
- Motivo in maschera (1955)
- Amaramente (1956) – Marco
- La canzone più bella (1957) – Paolo Ostuni
- Rome Adventure (1962) – Nightclub Singer (uncredited)
- The Shortest Day (1962) – Soldato (uncredited)
- La gitana y el charro (1964) – Pericoli
