= Norway in the Eurovision Song Contest 1963 =

- Eurovision Song Contest 1963
- Participating broadcaster: Norsk rikskringkasting (NRK)
- Country: Norway
- Selection process: Song: Melodi Grand Prix 1963; Artist: Internal selection
- Selection date: 10 February 1963

Competing entry
- Song: "Solhverv"
- Artist: Anita Thallaug
- Songwriter: Dag Kristoffersen

Placement
- Final result: 13th, 0 points

Participation chronology

Norway was represented at the Eurovision Song Contest 1963 with the song "Solhverv", written by Dag Kristoffersen, and performed by Anita Thallaug. The Norwegian participating broadcaster, Norsk rikskringkasting (NRK), organised the national final Melodi Grand Prix 1963 in order to select its entry for the contest.

Thallaug had not originally performed "Solhverv" at the Melodi Grand Prix, but NRK asked her to become its representative when the winning performer, Nora Brockstedt, pulled out of a third Eurovision appearance, citing a scheduling conflict with other previously arranged engagements.

== Before Eurovision ==
=== Melodi Grand Prix 1963 ===
Norsk rikskringkasting (NRK) held the Melodi Grand Prix 1963 at its studios in Oslo, hosted by Odd Grythe. Five songs took part in the final with each song sung twice by different singers, once with a small combo and once with a full orchestra. The winning song was chosen by voting from ten regional juries.

MGP - 10 February 1963
R/O	Combo	Orchestra	Song	Points	Place
1	Jens Book-Jensen	Ray Adams	"Vi slentret langs en vårlig sti"	54	3
2	Nora Brockstedt	Anita Thallaug	"Drømmekjolen"	50	4
3	Jan Høiland	Nora Brockstedt	"Solhverv"	81	1
4	Anita Thallaug	Beate Brevik	"Adjø"	40	5
5	Ray Adams	Jens Book-Jensen	"Jakteskipperen"	59	2

== At Eurovision ==
On the night of the final Thallaug performed 5th in the running order, following Austria and preceding Italy. Each national jury awarded 5-4-3-2-1 to its top five songs, and at the close of voting the song had failed to pick up any points at all, placing Norway joint last (along with Finland, the Netherlands, and Sweden who had been similarly snubbed) of the 16 entries. The Norwegian jury awarded its 5 points to the United Kingdom.

=== Voting ===
Norway did not receive any points at the 1963 Eurovision Song Contest.

Points awarded by Norway
Score	Country
5 points	United Kingdom
4 points	Denmark
3 points	Italy
2 points	Germany
1 point	Switzerland
