= Grethe and Jørgen Ingmann =

Danish married music couple

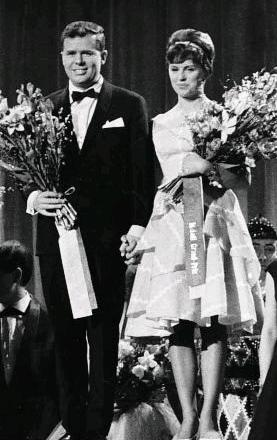
- Grethe & Jørgen Ingmann (1963)

Background information
- Origin: Denmark
- Genre: Pop
- Past members: Grethe Ingmann; Jørgen Ingmann

Grethe and Jørgen Ingmann were Danish singers and musicians. Together they won the Dansk Melodi Grand Prix in 1963, and went on to represent Denmark in the Eurovision Song Contest 1963 with the song "Dansevise" ("Dance Song") with music by Otto Francker and lyrics by Sejr Volmer-Sørensen. The song won the competition. No other Danish song would take first place in the Eurovision competition again until the year 2000 when the Olsen Brothers won with their song, "Fly on the Wings of Love", and again in 2013 when Emmelie de Forest won with the song "Only Teardrops"

Jørgen Ingmann was born on 26 April 1925 in Copenhagen, Denmark. Grethe Clemmensen was born on 17 June 1938 in Copenhagen, Denmark. They met in 1955, were married in 1956 and got divorced in 1975. Grethe Ingmann became the first Eurovision winner to die, which was because of cancer on 18 August 1990 in Denmark and Jørgen Ingmann died on 21 March 2015 in Denmark.

The US success of Jørgen Ingmann's version of Jerry Lordan's instrumental "Apache" (which hit no 1 in US Singles' list in 1961) was largely due to EMI's omission to release The Shadows' original 1960 version in time in the US. The cover version of the Dane came first and The Shadows' hit could not keep up with it in the US. In subsequent years, Jerry Lordan wrote many other instrumental hits for The Shadows ("Wonderful Land", Atlantis, Maroc 5). The Shadows could never really break through in the US, not even in the wave of the "British Invasion" in the mid-sixties.

Awards and achievements
Preceded by Ellen Winther with "Vuggevise"	Denmark in the Eurovision Song Contest; 1963	Succeeded by Bjørn Tidmand with "Sangen om dig"
Preceded by (France) Isabelle Aubret with "Un premier amour"	Winner of the Eurovision Song Contest; 1963	Succeeded by (Italy) Gigliola Cinquetti with "Non ho l'età"
