= Willem Duys =

Dutch media personality

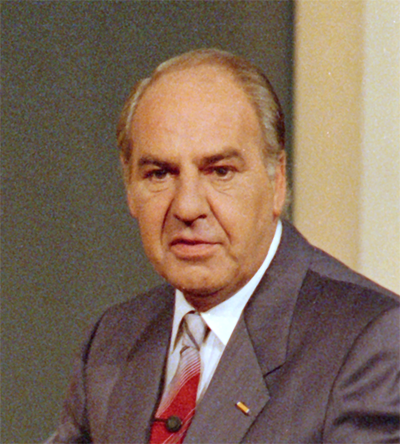
- Duys in 1985
- Born: 17 August 1928; Bussum, Netherlands
- Died: 2 June 2011 (aged 82); Hilversum, Netherlands
- Occupations: Television presenter, broadcaster, music producer
- Employer: AVRO
- Spouse: Elizabeth Pauline Keylock
- Children: Malcolm Ernest (born 1965); Saskia Pauline (born 1970)

Willem Duys (17 August 1928 – 2 June 2011) was a Dutch radio and television presenter, commentator, tennis player and music producer.

Duys was born in Bussum. He first started a career as a tennis player. Having made the final NK Older Youth (Van Lennep Cup) in 1946, he won the Spieghel Hilversum and Heide B tournament, took the semi-finals Plaswijck Kralingen and won the B tournament in Rotterdam. He also reached the final three men's doubles Flehite A with Peter Scholtz and was 1956 men's singles champion Unilever (following Jan de Soet).

After retiring from tennis in mid 1956 Duys began writing for various music magazines and was invited to act as an announcer on AVRO in 1956. He became a television presenter in 1959. From 1963 until 1979 he presented the TV program "Voor de Vuist Weg", generally considered to be the first talk show on Dutch television. In 1974 he received the Gouden Televizierring for this program. He regularly presented the Grand Gala du Disque and was a commentator for large tennis matches. For eight years (1962, 1963, 1974–1976, 1978, 1979 and 1983) he commented the Eurovision Song Contest for Dutch television viewers. Duys also presented the Sunday morning radio show "Muziek Mozaïek" for four decades. A TV version of that show ran for six seasons. In 1999, after a cerebral infarction, he retired. He worked for the AVRO for more than forty years.

Willem Duys lived alternately in Saint-Paul, Alpes-Maritimes and Naarden and thereafter in Hilversum. He died in Hilversum on 2 June 2011 from a lung infection.
