= Bjørn Tidmand =

Danish singer (1940–2026)

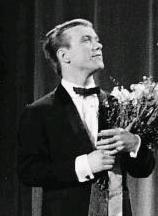
- Tidmand in 1963

Background information
- Born: 24 January 1940; Copenhagen, Denmark
- Died: 26 May 2026 (aged 86) Helsingør, Denmark
- Genres: Pop
- Occupation: Singer
- Website: Bjørn Tidmand

Bjørn Tidmand (24 January 1940 – 26 May 2026) was a Danish singer, best known for his participation in the Eurovision Song Contest 1964.

== Life and career ==
After being a member of the Copenhagen Boys Choir as a child, Tidmand began performing in local nightclubs and signed a recording contract in 1959, having a hit with a Danish-language version of the Sam Cooke song "Only Sixteen".

In 1963, Tidmand took part in the Dansk Melodi Grand Prix to choose the country's Eurovision Song Contest entry, and finished in second place behind Grethe & Jørgen Ingmann, who went on to win that year's Eurovision for Denmark. The following year, Tidmand won the DMGP with the song "Sangen om dig" ("The Song About You"), which went on to the ninth Eurovision, held in his home city of Copenhagen on 21 March. "Sangen om dig" finished the evening in ninth place of the 16 entries.

Tidmand went on to enjoy a string of hits in Denmark, while developing a parallel career as a television host in the 1970s and 1980s. He remained active and continued touring and performing until his retirement in 2020. He died on 26 May 2026, at the age of 86.

Preceded by Grethe & Jørgen Ingmann with Dansevise	Denmark in the Eurovision Song Contest; 1964	Succeeded by Birgit Brüel with For din skyld
