= Anita Thallaug =

Norwegian actress and singer (1938–2023)

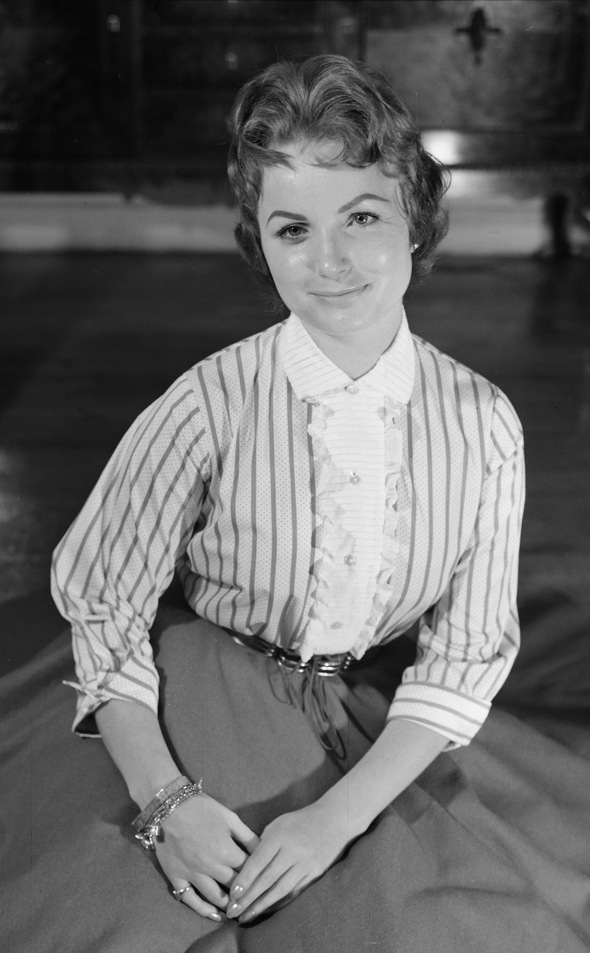
- Thallaug in 1957

Background information
- Born: 14 February 1938; Bærum, Norway
- Died: 20 March 2023 (aged 85)
- Occupations: Actress, singer
- Spouse: Knut Jernberg Heim (m. 1971; died 2014)

Anita Thallaug (14 February 1938 – 20 March 2023) was a Norwegian actress and singer. She was the Norwegian contestant in the Eurovision Song Contest 1963, where she sang the song "Solhverv".

== Biography ==
Thallaug was born in Bærum on 14 February 1938. She was featured in musicals, cinema and television programs. Under the name Vesla Rolfsen, at the age of seven, Thallaug was performing at the Spider theatre in Oslo. She was also featured in NRK children's programs of the 1950s.

Thallaug was the Norwegian contestant in the Eurovision Song Contest 1963, with the song "Solhverv", where she finished 13th (last). She was the first of four Norwegian entrants to score no points in the competition.

=== Personal life ===
Thallaug was the younger sister of opera singer Edith Thallaug.

She was married to Knut Jernberg Heim (1934-2014). They stayed married, up until Heim's death in 2014. The couple had two daughters, named Ann-Karin and Lizbeth Marie.

She died on 20 March 2023, at the age of 85.

== Melodi Grand Prix entries ==
Year	Title	Placing in national final	Placing in eurovision
1962	Mormors spilledåse (Grandmother's music box)	5	
1962	Våre skal dagene være (The days shall be ours)	4	
1963	Drømmekjolen (The dream dress)	4	
1963	Adjø (Adieu)	5	
1963	Solhverv (Solstice)		13
1966	Ung og forelsket (Young and in love)	3	
1966	Vims (Fussy Person)	5	

== Films ==
- 1990: Den spanske flue (The Spanish Fly) (TV) Mrs Meisel
- 1964: Klokker i måneskinn (Bells in the Moonlight) Mannekeng, 'Manager of affairs'
- 1962: Operation Løvsprett Søster Bitten
- 1957: Blondin i fara (Blonde in Danger) (Swedish film) Mona Mace
- 1954: I moralens navn (The Moral Reputation)

Awards and achievements
Preceded by Inger Jacobsen with "Kom sol, kom regn"	Norway in the Eurovision Song Contest; 1963	Succeeded by Arne Bendiksen with "Spiral"
