= À force de prier =

1963 song by Nana Mouskouri

Single by Nana Mouskouri
- Language: French
- Released: 1963
- Label: Fontana Records
- Composer(s): Raymond Bernard
- Lyricist(s): Pierre Delanoë

Eurovision Song Contest 1963 entry
- Country: Luxembourg
- Artist(s): Nana Mouskouri
- Language: French
- Composer(s): Raymond Bernard
- Lyricist(s): Pierre Delanoë
- Conductor: Eric Robinson

Finals performance
- Final result: 8th
- Final points: 13

Entry chronology
- ◄ "Petit bonhomme" (1962)
- "Dès que le printemps revient" (1964) ►

"À force de prier" (French pronunciation: [a fɔʁs də pʁije]; "By Persistently Praying") is a song recorded by Greek singer Nana Mouskouri, with music composed by Raymond Bernard and French lyrics written by Pierre Delanoë. It represented Luxembourg in the Eurovision Song Contest 1963, held in London.

== Background ==
=== Conception ===
"À force de prier" was composed by Raymond Bernard with French lyrics by Pierre Delanoë. It is a ballad with the singer telling the object of her affections that she intends to have him love her "by persistently praying" for this to occur.

=== National selection ===
The Compagnie Luxembourgeoise de Télédiffusion (CLT) internally selected "À force de prier" performed by Nana Mouskouri as its entry for the 8th edition of the Eurovision Song Contest. She recorded the song also in German –as "Die Worte dieser Nacht" with lyrics by Hans Bradtke–, English –as "The One That Got Away" with lyrics by Lewis–, and Italian – as "La notte non lo sa"–.

Mouskouri had had her international breakthrough with the German language single "Weiße Rosen aus Athen" ("White Roses from Athens") in 1961, a song originally adapted from a Greek folk melody. The song was later translated into several different languages and went on to become one of Mouskouri's signature tunes. When she received the offer to represent Luxembourg at Eurovision in early 1963 she and her family had recently relocated from Athens, Greece, to Paris, France, where she was signed to the Philips-Fontana label.

=== Eurovision ===
On 23 March 1963, the Eurovision Song Contest was held at the BBC Television Centre in London hosted by the British Broadcasting Corporation (BBC) and broadcast live throughout the continent. Mouskouri performed "À force de prier" sixteenth and last on the evening, following Monaco's "L'amour s'en va" by Françoise Hardy. Eric Robinson conducted the event's live orchestra in the performance of the Luxembourgian entry. This was the second appearance of a Greek artist on the Eurovision stage after Jimmy Makulis in the 1961 contest for Austria. Greece would not join until the 1974 contest.

At the close of voting, the song had received 13 points, placing eighth in a field of sixteen. It was succeeded as Luxembourgian representative at the 1964 contest by "Dès que le printemps revient" by Hugues Aufray.

=== Aftermath ===
Although "À force de prier" was only a minor international success for Mouskouri, it won her the prestigious Grand Prix du Disque in France that same year, and her Eurovision appearance also caught the attention of noted French composer Michel Legrand, who went on to write and arrange two major hits for her in the Francophone markets; "Les parapluies de Cherbourg" (1964) and "L'enfant au tambour" (1965). The BBC, the host broadcaster of the contest, also noticed her talents and started to do specials with her afterwards. On 20 May 2006, Mouskouri opened the voting lines for the grand final of the Eurovision Song Contest 2006 held in Athens, where she was presented as "the best selling artist of all time".
