= Elle était si jolie =

1963 song by Alain Barrière

Single by Alain Barrière
- Language: French
- Released: 1963
- Songwriters: Alain Barrière; A. Migiani

Eurovision Song Contest 1963 entry
- Country: France
- Artist: Alain Barrière
- Language: French
- Composers: Alain Barrière, A. Migiani
- Lyricists: Alain Barrière, A. Migiani
- Conductor: Franck Pourcel

Finals performance
- Final result: 5th
- Final points: 25

Entry chronology
- ◄ "Un premier amour" (1962)
- "Le Chant de Mallory" (1964) ►

"Elle était si jolie" (French pronunciation: [ɛl etɛ si ʒɔli]; "She Was So Pretty") is a song written by Alain Barrière and A. Migiani, and performed by Barrière himself. It represented France in the Eurovision Song Contest 1963.

The song was performed eleventh on the night (following Switzerland's Esther Ofarim with "T'en va pas" and preceding Spain's José Guardiola with "Algo prodigioso"). At the close of voting, it had received 25 points, placing 5th in a field of 16.

The song is a ballad, with Barrière reminiscing about a girl he used to know and how pretty she was. Her beauty was apparently so much that he could not love her. Barrière also recorded the song in German and Italian, as "Du gingst fort ohne Abschied" and "Era troppo carina" respectively. The song was well received in Latin America, particularly in Chile.

It was succeeded as French representative at the 1964 contest by Rachel with "Le Chant de Mallory".

== Dragan Stojnić version ==
Dragan Stojnić, a Yugoslav chanson singer, released a cover version of the song in 1965 with lyrics in Serbo-Croatian, entitled "Bila je tako lijepa". The song was released on the EP of the same name, becoming a major hit in Yugoslavia.

== Pekinška Patka version ==
"Bila je tako lijepa"

Single by Pekinška Patka
- B-side: "Bumba, rumba"
- Released: 1980
- Recorded: 1980
- Studio: Meta Sound studio, Novi Sad
- Genre: Punk rock
- Length: 3:24
- Label: Jugoton; SY 23756
- Songwriters: A. Barrière, B. Stojadinović, N. Čonkić
- Producer: Pekinška Patka

Pekinška Patka singles chronology
"Bolje da nosim kratku kosu" (1980)	"Bila je tako lijepa" (1980)	"Un año de amor (Pain Version)" (2010)

Yugoslav punk rock band Pekinška Patka recorded a cover of Dragan Stojnić's version, releasing it on a 7-inch single in 1980, with "Bumba, rumba" as the B-side. The release was the band's third and last 7-inch single.

Track listing

1. "Bila je tako lijepa" (A. Barrière, B. Stojadinović, N. Čonkić) (3:24)
2. "Bumba, rumba" (N. Čonkić, S. Kovačević) (2:24)

== Other versions ==
Croatian punk rock band Hladno Pivo released a cover of Pekinška Patka version on their 1995 album G.A.D.. German punk rock band Autozynik released a cover of Pekinška Patka version on their 2000 album Bing.

Israeli singer Daklon recorded a cover version of the song in Hebrew, called "Benativ Meurpal" ("On a Foggy Path"), in 1998. Israeli singer Rika Zarai also recorded a cover of the song. Israeli poet David Avidan wrote a parody based on the Hebrew version, performed by Arik Lavie, with lyrics about a prostitute and her pimp.

In Vietnamese, the song is known as "Em Đẹp Như Mơ".
