= Sejr Volmer-Sørensen =

Danish lyricist, actor, director, and television host

- Born: 7 February 1914; Kristianstad, Sweden
- Origin: Sweden/Denmark
- Died: 11 May 1982 (aged 68) Copenhagen, Denmark
- Genre: Various
- Occupations: Actor; lyricist; director; TV host
- Years active: 1932–1982

Sejr Volmer-Sørensen (7 February 1914 – 11 May 1982), also known as Volmer-Sørensen and Win Volmer-Sørensen, was a Danish lyricist, actor, director and television host.

== Career ==
Born in Kristianstad, Volmer-Sørensen was adopted by a family of leather merchants. In 1932, he graduated and moved to Paris to train as a pianist and made his debut as a musician at the 1934 Tivoli Concert. In 1950 he joined the Danish broadcaster Danmark Radio, where he became a popular radio and television host, on such shows as Telefonen ringer and På'en igen which he co-hosted with Christian Arhoff. He also hosted the first five Dansk Melodi Grand Prix (Trials for the Eurovision Song Contest).

He wrote the lyrics for the winning Eurovision song Dansevise which was sung by Grethe and Jørgen Ingmann.

In 1968 he married actress Grethe Sønck. He died in Copenhagen in 1982.
