= Eric Robinson (conductor) =

British conductor (1908–1974)

- Born: 13 December 1908
- Died: 24 July 1974 (aged 65)
- Education: Royal College of Music
- Occupations: Conductor; Television presenter
- Organizations: BBC Theatre Orchestra; BBC Television Orchestra

Eric Robinson (13 December 1908 – 24 July 1974) was a conductor and presenter of music for the BBC. He studied violin at the Royal College of Music and played in restaurant orchestras and the BBC Theatre Orchestra until 1936, then joining the BBC Television Orchestra.

During World War II, Robinson served in the Royal Army Ordnance Corps: in 1943, he was with the depot band at Chilwell Central Ordnance Depot, and conducted "The Blue Rockets", a section of the band who provided light music. He was twice the musical director of the Eurovision Song Contest when staged in London in 1960 and 1963 and on other occasions between 1957 and 1965, Robinson conducted the orchestra accompanying the United Kingdom's entry in the competition.

In 1962, Robinson and musician George Clouston bought IBC Studios from Leonard Plugge. Robinson also provided the financial support and backing for Mellotronics, a company formed to distribute and market the Mellotron tape-replay keyboard, and Robinson was heavily involved in the original marketing and promotion. He hoped the popularity of a new and novel instrument would revitalise his career. IBC Studios was used to record tapes for the instrument. Robinson co-owned the studios until 1978, when they were purchased by Chas Chandler.

Robinson's elder brother Stanford Robinson (1904–84) was a popular conductor and composer.

His daughter Vivienne Robinson married the magician David Nixon in 1961.

Robinson died on 24 July 1974 aged 65.

Media offices
Preceded by (France) Franck Pourcel	Eurovision Song Contest conductor 1960	Succeeded by (France) Franck Pourcel
Preceded by (Luxembourg) Jean Roderès	Eurovision Song Contest conductor 1963	Succeeded by (Denmark) Kai Mortensen
