= Sweden in the Eurovision Song Contest 1963 =

- Eurovision Song Contest 1963
- Participating broadcaster: Sveriges Radio (SR)
- Country: Sweden
- Selection process: National final
- Selection date: 16 February 1963

Competing entry
- Song: "En gång i Stockholm"
- Artist: Monica Zetterlund
- Songwriters: Bobbie Ericson; Beppe Wolgers

Placement
- Final result: 13th, 0 points

Participation chronology

Sweden was represented at the Eurovision Song Contest 1963 with the song "En gång i Stockholm", composed by Bobbie Ericsson, with lyrics by Beppe Wolgers, and performed by Monica Zetterlund. The Swedish participating broadcaster, Sveriges Radio (SR), selected its entry through a national final titled Eurovisionsschlagern, svensk final.

The Eurovision Song Contest, which was held in London, could have gone better for Sweden. They scored for the first (and so far only) time nul points.

== Before Eurovision ==
=== Eurovisionsschlagern, svensk final ===
Eurovisionsschlagern, svensk final (retroactively often referred to as Melodifestivalen 1963) was the selection for the sixth song to represent Sweden at the Eurovision Song Contest. It was the fifth time that Sveriges Radio (SR) used this system of picking a song. One singer performed the song with a large orchestra, and one with a smaller orchestra. 816 songs were submitted to SR for the competition. The final was held in the Cirkus in Stockholm on 16 February 1963, broadcast on Sveriges Radio TV, but was not broadcast on radio.

| R/O | Artist^{1} | Artist^{2} | Song | Songwriters | Place |
|---|---|---|---|---|---|
| 1 | Lars Lönndahl | Gunnar Wiklund | "Vårens flickparad" | Britt Lindeborg | |
| 2 | Roffe Berg, Hasse Burman & Charlie Norman | Gerd Söderberg | "Hong Kong-sång" | Bobbie Ericson, Bo Eneby | |
| 3 | Anna-Lena Löfgren | Ann-Louise Hanson | "Säg varför" | Ulf Källqvist | |
| 4 | Gerd Söderberg | Roffe Berg, Hasse Burman & Charlie Norman | "Storstadsmelodi" | Gunnar Lundén-Welden | 2 |
| 5 | Per & Ulf Lindqvist | Lily Berglund | "Rosen och vinden" | Owe Thörnqvist | |
| 6 | Monica Zetterlund | Carli Tornehave | "En gång i Stockholm" | Bobbie Ericson, Beppe Wolgers | 1 |
| 7 | Lily Berglund | Mona Grain | "Sen igår är vi kära" | Carl Gyllenberg, Harry Arnold | |
| 8 | Tommy Jacobson | Bertil Englund | "Fröken Eko" | Britt Lindeborg | |
| 9 | Gunnar Wiklund | Tommy Jacobsson | "Scheherazade" | Åke Gerhard | |
| 10 | Mona Grain | Ann-Catrine Widlund | "Jag är så trött på allt det här" | Bo Harry Sandin | |
| 11 | Ann-Louise Hanson | Per & Ulf Lindqvist | "Zum zum zum, lilla sommarbi" | Sam Samson, Fritz-Gustaf Sundelöf | |
| 12 | Carli Tornehave | Lars Lönndahl | "Twist till menuett" | Thore Skogman | 3 |

- 1: Performer with large orchestra
- 2: Performer with smaller orchestra

== At Eurovision ==
Monica Zetterlund performed "En gång i Stockholm" at Eurovision, and became the first and only artist to score nul points for Sweden.

=== Voting ===
Sweden did not receive any points at the Eurovision Song Contest 1963.

Points awarded by Sweden
| Score | Country |
|---|---|
| 5 points | Denmark |
| 4 points | Monaco |
| 3 points | Austria |
| 2 points | United Kingdom |
| 1 point | Switzerland |
