= L'amour s'en va =

1963 song by Françoise Hardy

Single by Françoise Hardy
- Language: French
- Released: 1963
- Length: 2:24
- Label: Vogue
- Songwriter(s): Françoise Hardy

Françoise Hardy singles chronology
"Ton meilleur ami" (1962)	"L'amour s'en va" (1963)	"Qui aime-t-il vraiment ?" (1963)

Eurovision Song Contest 1963 entry
- Country: Monaco
- Artist(s): Françoise Hardy
- Language: French
- Composer(s): Françoise Hardy
- Lyricist(s): Françoise Hardy
- Conductor: Raymond Lefèvre

Finals performance
- Final result: 5th
- Final points: 25

Entry chronology
- ◄ "Dis rien" (1962)
- "Où sont-elles passées" (1964) ►

Official performance video
- "L'amour s'en va" on YouTube

"L'amour s'en va" (French pronunciation: [lamuʁ sɑ̃ va]; "Love goes away") is a song composed, written, and performed by French singer-songwriter and actress Françoise Hardy. It represented Monaco in the Eurovision Song Contest 1963, she recorded it in other languages, gained chart success in Belgium, won France's prestigious award Grand Prix du Disque, and over time it has become one of Hardy's signature songs.

== Background ==
=== Conception ===
Françoise Hardy had had her breakthrough as an 18-year-old in late 1962 with the yé-yé hit "Tous les garçons et les filles" and she would go on to become one of the Francophone world's most successful and popular artists of the 1960s – as well as an influential fashion icon.

She wrote and composed the song "L'amour s'en va". This is a slow-paced chanson, a style popular in France and Europe in the 1960s. Under the song's title which means "love goes away", Hardy sings about a relationship which is conducted in the knowledge that love is a fleeting thing – however this does not seem to matter to either of the lovers involved, as they "chase after it".

In addition to the French language original version, she recorded an Italian version as "L'amore va", with lyrics by Vito Pallavicini, and a German version as "Die Liebe geht", with lyrics by Ernst Bader.

=== Eurovision ===
Télé Monte-Carlo (TMC) internally selected "L'amour s'en va" as its entrant for the 8th edition of the Eurovision Song Contest.

On 23 March 1963, the Eurovision Song Contest was held at the BBC Television Centre in London hosted by the British Broadcasting Corporation (BBC) and broadcast live throughout the continent. Hardy performed "L'amour s'en va" fifteenth on the evening, following Belgium's "Waarom?" by Jacques Raymond and preceding Luxembourg's "À force de prier" by Nana Mouskouri. Raymond Lefèvre conducted the event's live orchestra in the performance of the Monegasque entry.

At the close of voting, the song had received 25 points, placing fifth in a field of sixteen. It was succeeded as Monegasque entry at the 1964 contest by "Où sont-elles passées" by Romuald.

=== Aftermath ===
The song is included in a compilation album of French-language Eurovision Song Contest entries, titled "Eurovision: Les plus belles chansons françaises", released in 2000.

== Charts ==
"L'amour s'en va" entered Belgium's two main charts in 1963, the official French-Belgian on 1 April until 1 September spanning twenty-four weeks, and the official Flemish-Belgian on 1 June 1963 where it spanned four weeks. The song was also a big hit in Sweden being number 1 at the best selling chart of the music paper "Show Business", number 1 at Tio i Topp and peaked at number 2 on the best selling chart Kvällstoppen.

=== Weekly charts ===
Chart (1963)	Position
France	5
Belgium (Ultratop Wallonia)	7
Belgium (Ultratop Flanders)	17
Sweden (Kvällstoppen)	2
Sweden (Tio i Topp)	1
