= Sanremo Music Festival 1963 =

Italian song contest (13th edition)

Dates and venue
- Semi-final 1: 7 February 1963
- Semi-final 2: 8 February 1963
- Final: 9 February 1963
- Venue: Sanremo Casino; Sanremo, Italy

Organisation
- Organiser: Società ATA

Production
- Broadcaster: Radiotelevisione italiana (RAI)
- Director: Vittorio Brignole
- Musical director: Gigi Cichellero; Pino Calvi
- Artistic director: Gianni Ravera
- Presenters: Mike Bongiorno and Edy Campagnoli, Maria Giovannini, Rossana Armani, Giuliana Copreni

Vote
- Number of entries: 20
- Winner: "Uno per tutte" Tony Renis and Emilio Pericoli

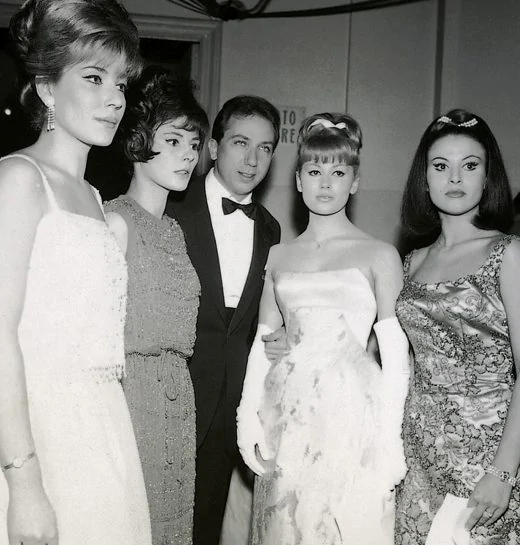
Left to right: Edy Campagnoli, Rossana Armani, Mike Bongiorno, Giuliana Copreni and Maria Giovannini at Sanremo 1963

The Sanremo Music Festival 1963 (Italian: Festival di Sanremo 1963), officially the 13th Italian Song Festival (13º Festival della canzone italiana), was the 13th annual Sanremo Music Festival, held at the Sanremo Casino in Sanremo between 7 and 9 February 1963. It was organised by Società ATA, concessionary of the Sanremo Casino, and broadcast by Radiotelevisione italiana (RAI). The shows were presented by Mike Bongiorno, assisted by Edy Campagnoli, Maria Giovannini, Rossana Armani and Giuliana Copreni. Gianni Ravera served as artistic director.

According to the rules of this edition every song was performed in a double performance by a couple of singers or groups. The winners of the festival were Tony Renis and Emilio Pericoli with the song "Uno per tutte". Pericoli went on to perform the song for Italy at the Eurovision Song Contest 1963, achieving third place.

== Participants and results ==
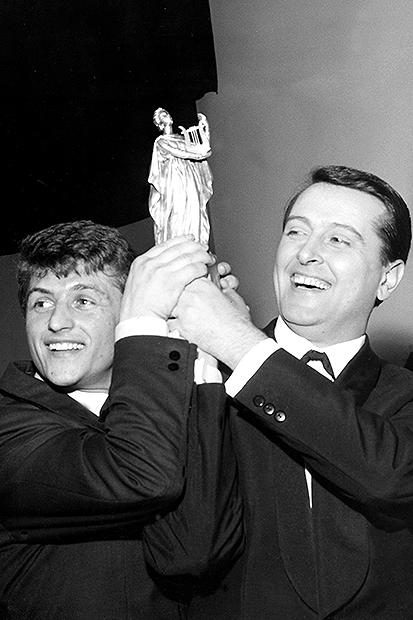
Tony Renis (left) and Emilio Pericoli holding the first prize

Participants and results
Song	Artist(s)		Songwriter(s)	Rank
"Uno per tutte"	Tony Renis	Emilio Pericoli	Mogol; Tony Renis; Alberto Testa	1
"Amor, mon amour, my love"	Claudio Villa	Eugenia Foligatti	Walter Malgoni; Pinchi; Bruno Pallesi	2
"Giovane giovane"	Pino Donaggio	Cocky Mazzetti	Pino Donaggio; Alberto Testa	3
"Non costa niente"	Wilma De Angelis	Johnny Dorelli	Eros Sciorilli; Diego Calcagno	4
"Ricorda"	Milva	Luciano Tajoli	Carlo Donida; Mogol	5
"Perdonarsi in due"	Tonina Torrielli	Eugenia Foligatti	Giovanni D'Anzi; Pinchi	6
"Occhi neri e cielo blu"	Aurelio Fierro	Claudio Villa	Mario Panzeri; Daniele Pace	7
"Sull'acqua"	Emilio Pericoli	Sergio Bruni	Mario Pagano; Franco Maresca	8
"Tu venisti dal mare"	Aura D'Angelo	Arturo Testa	Furio Rendine; Antonio Pugliese	9
"Non sapevo"	Milva	Gianni Lacommare	Pino Calvi; Bruno Pallesi	10
"Com'è piccolo il cielo"	Gianni Lacommare	Tonina Torrielli	Giorgio Signori; Vinicio Garavaglia	Eliminated
"Fermate il mondo"	Joe Sentieri	Johnny Dorelli	Bruno Canfora; Dino Verde	Eliminated
"La ballata del pedone"	Ennio Sangiusto	Quartetto Radar	Vittorio Pierantoni	Eliminated
"Le voci"	Ennio Sangiusto	Luciano Tajoli	Gianni Fallabrino; Luciana Medini	Eliminated
"Oggi non ho tempo"	Mario Abbate	Quartetto Radar	Corrado Lojacono; Nisa	Eliminated
"Perché perché"	Tony Renis	Cocky Mazzetti	Gigi Cichellero	Eliminated
"Quando ci si vuol bene... (come noi)"	Arturo Testa	Joe Sentieri	Elio Isola; Bruno Zambrini; Giorgio Calabrese	Eliminated
"Se passerai di qui"	Wilma De Angelis	Flo Sandon's	Angelo Camis; Gian Carlo Testoni	Eliminated
"Un cappotto rivoltato"	Aurelio Fierro	Sergio Bruni	Oronzo Leuzzi; Francesco Specchia	Eliminated
"Vorrei fermare il tempo"	Mario Abbate	Flo Sandon's	P.G. Redi; Idalgo Franchini	Eliminated

== Broadcasts ==
=== Local broadcast ===
Part of the first two nights were broadcast on television via Secondo Programma, with the first night beginning at 22:25 CET and the second night beginning at 22:10 CET. Both nights were broadcast in full on radio beginning at 22:15 CET. The final night was broadcast on television via Programma Nazionale and on radio via Secondo Programma beginning at 21:35 CET. The final was broadcast on television in Italy to an estimated 13.4 million viewers.

=== International broadcasts ===
The final was broadcast abroad via the Eurovision network. Known details on the broadcasts in each country, including the specific broadcasting stations and commentators are shown in the tables below.

International broadcasters of the Sanremo Music Festival 1963
Country	Broadcaster	Channel(s)	Commentator(s)	Ref(s)
Germany	ARD	Deutsches Fernsehen (Note: Delayed broadcast on 26 February at 22:40 CET.)		
Netherlands	NTS	NTS (Note: Delayed broadcast on 11 February at 22:15 CET.)	Willem Duys	
