= Pridi, dala ti bom cvet =

1970 song by Eva Sršen

Single by Eva Sršen
- Language: Slovene
- Released: 1970
- Composer: Mojmir Sepe
- Lyricist: Dušan Velkaverh

Eurovision Song Contest 1970 entry
- Country: Yugoslavia
- Artist: Eva Sršen
- Language: Slovene
- Composer: Mojmir Sepe
- Lyricist: Dušan Velkaverh
- Conductor: Mojmir Sepe

Finals performance
- Final result: 11th
- Final points: 4

Entry chronology
- ◄ "Pozdrav svijetu" (1969)
- "Tvoj dječak je tužan" (1971) ►

"Pridi, dala ti bom cvet" (English: "Come closer, I'll give you a flower") is a song recorded by 18-year-old Slovenian music newcomer Eva Sršen. It represented Yugoslavia in the Eurovision Song Contest 1970. The song marked the third of four occasions in which Yugoslavia's entry was performed in Slovene.

== Pesma Evrovizije 1970 ==
Sršen won the right to compete for Yugoslavia after winning Pesma Evrovizije 1970, held on February 14, 1970, where she competed against 14 other performers. Sršen performed fifth at the final and at the end of voting, "Pridi, dala ti bom cvet" received 26 points from the nine member jury, placing her first.

== At Eurovision ==
At Amsterdam, the song was performed fourth on the night, after Italy's Gianni Morandi with "Occhi di ragazza", and before Belgium's Jean Vallée with "Viens l'oublier". The song uses the metaphor of "flowers", as the singer describes that she is the flower "that nobody can reach but you", the "you" implying her secret love. At the end of judging that evening, "Pridi, dala ti bom cvet" took the eleventh-place slot with four points, all of them awarded to Yugoslavia by the United Kingdom.

RTÉ commentator Valerie McGovern deemed the performance "simple and ungimmicky", ostensibly comparing it to the Italian entry performed right before, of which McGovern simply said, "it was certainly a happy approach any way he gave it".

== Cover version ==
In 2010, an a cappella cover version by singer Barbara Mratinkovič (aka LadyBird Barbara) was produced by Aldo Ivančič and published on YouTube as a retro 1970s-style musical video, directed by Neven Korda.
