= Eurovision Song Contest 1970 =

International song competition

Coordinates: 52°20′29″N 4°53′18″E

Date and venue
- Final: 21 March 1970
- Venue: RAI International Congress Centre; Amsterdam, Netherlands

Organisation
- Organiser: European Broadcasting Union (EBU)
- Scrutineer: Clifford Brown

Production
- Host broadcaster: Nederlandse Omroep Stichting (NOS)
- Director: Theo Ordeman
- Executive producer: Warner van Kampen
- Musical director: Dolf van der Linden
- Presenter: Willy Dobbe

Participants
- Number of entries: 12
- Non-returning countries: Finland; Norway; Portugal; Sweden
- Participation map: Competing countries Countries that participated in the past but not in 1970

Vote
- Voting system: Ten-member juries in each country; each member gave one vote to their favourite song
- Winning song: Ireland "All Kinds of Everything"

The Eurovision Song Contest 1970 was the 15th edition of the Eurovision Song Contest, held on 21 March 1970 at the RAI International Congress Centre in Amsterdam, Netherlands, and presented by Willy Dobbe. It was organised by the European Broadcasting Union (EBU) and host broadcaster Nederlandse Omroep Stichting (NOS), who staged the event after winning the 1969 contest for the Netherlands in a joint victory with France, Spain, and the United Kingdom. As the 1969 contest was held in Spain, and the 1968 contest in the United Kingdom, a draw of ballots between the French and the Dutch broadcasters resulted in NOS being chosen as the host broadcaster.

Broadcasters from twelve countries participated in the contest this year, the lowest number of participants since 1959. Finland, Norway, Portugal, and Sweden all boycotted the 1970 edition, officially because they felt that the contest marginalised smaller countries and was no longer good television entertainment, though it is rumoured that they, along with Austria which had already opted not to take part in 1969, were protesting the four-way tie result that had occurred that year.

The winner was Ireland with the song "All Kinds of Everything", performed by Dana, and written by Derry Lindsay and Jackie Smith. This was Ireland's first of their eventual record seven victories in the contest. The United Kingdom finished in second place for a record-extending seventh time, while Germany ended up in third place – the best result for the country at the time. This was also the only time that Luxembourg received nul points.

== Location ==
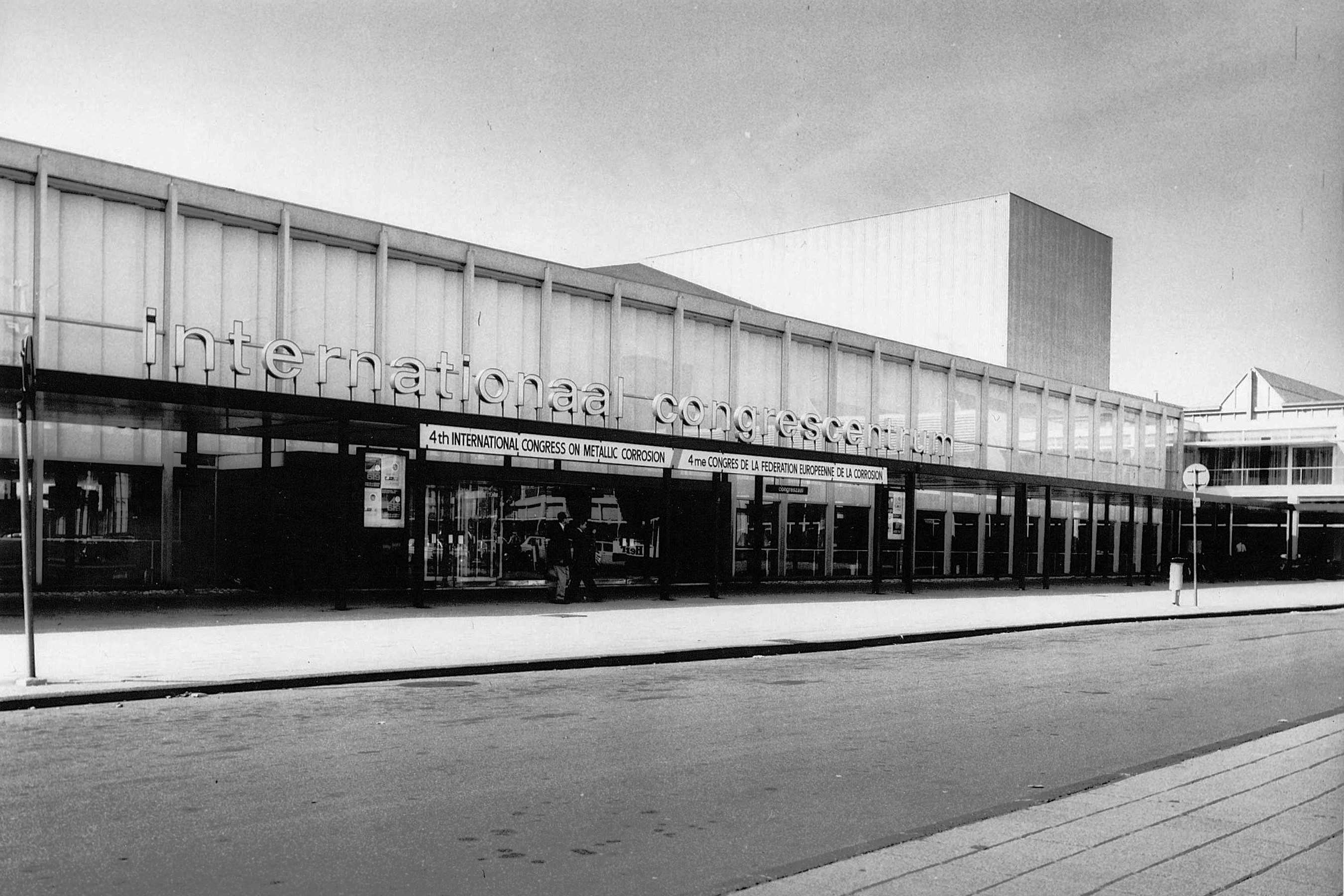
RAI International Congress Centre, host venue of the 1970 contest

According to tradition, the winning broadcaster of the Eurovision Song Contest one year is entitled to host the following year's edition. Due to the unprecedented four-way tie for first place in the Eurovision Song Contest 1969, (Note: Namely "Un jour, un enfant" performed by Frida Boccara for France, "Vivo cantando" by Salomé for Spain, "De troubadour" by Lenny Kuhr for the Netherlands, and "Boom Bang-a-Bang" by Lulu for the United Kingdom.) the European Broadcasting Union (EBU) had to decide who would host the 1970 edition. On 18 April 1969, during an EBU Television Programme Committee meeting at the Krasnapolsky Hotel in Amsterdam, they agreed that because the British Broadcasting Corporation (BBC) and Televisión Española (TVE) had already hosted the contest in 1968 and 1969 respectively, the choice would be between Nederlandse Televisie Stichting (NTS) and Office de Radiodiffusion Télévision Française (ORTF), so they proceeded to draw lots.

The draw was won by NTS, which merged into the Nederlandse Omroep Stichting (NOS) on 29 May 1969. Amsterdam was subsequently selected as the host city, with the contest staged at the RAI International Congress Centre. Opened in 1965, the venue's main auditorium offered a seating capacity that could accommodate 1,500 spectators.

== Participants ==
Eurovision Song Contest 1970 – Participation summaries by country
- Belgium; France; Germany; Ireland; Italy; Luxembourg; Monaco; Netherlands; Spain; Switzerland; United Kingdom; Yugoslavia

Finland, Norway, Portugal, and Sweden all boycotted the 1970 edition, officially because they felt that the contest marginalised smaller countries and was no longer good television entertainment, though it is rumoured that they, along with Austria which had already opted not to take part in 1969, were protesting the four-way tie result that had occurred that year.

For the first time, no lead artists from previous contests returned. However, María Jesús Aguirre and Mercedes Valimaña, members of Trío La La La, who provided backing vocals for Spain in 1968, returned as backing singers for Spain.

Eurovision Song Contest 1970 participants
Country	Broadcaster	Artist	Song	Language	Songwriter(s)	Conductor
Belgium	RTB	Jean Vallée	"Viens l'oublier"	French	Jean Vallée	Jack Say
France	ORTF	Guy Bonnet	"Marie-Blanche"	French	Guy Bonnet; Pierre-André Dousset	Franck Pourcel
Germany	HR (Note: On behalf of the German public broadcasting consortium ARD)	Katja Ebstein	"Wunder gibt es immer wieder"	German	Christian Bruhn; Günter Loose	Christian Bruhn
Ireland	RTÉ	Dana	"All Kinds of Everything"	English	Derry Lindsay; Jackie Smith	Dolf van der Linden
Italy	RAI	Gianni Morandi	"Occhi di ragazza"	Italian	Gianfranco Baldazzi; Sergio Bardotti; Lucio Dalla	Mario Capuano
Luxembourg	CLT	David Alexandre Winter	"Je suis tombé du ciel"	French	Eddy Marnay; Yves de Vriendt	Raymond Lefèvre
Monaco	TMC	Dominique Dussault	"Marlène"	French	Eddie Barclay; Henri Dijan; Jimmy Walter	Jimmy Walter
Netherlands	NOS	Patricia and Hearts of Soul	"Waterman"	Dutch	Pieter Goemans	Dolf van der Linden
Spain	TVE	Julio Iglesias	"Gwendolyne"	Spanish	Julio Iglesias	Augusto Algueró
Switzerland	SRG SSR	Henri Dès	"Retour"	French	Henri Dès	Bernard Gérard
United Kingdom	BBC	Mary Hopkin	"Knock, Knock (Who's There?)"	English	John Carter; Geoff Stephens	Johnny Arthey
Yugoslavia	JRT	Eva Sršen	"Pridi, dala ti bom cvet"	Slovene	Mojmir Sepe; Dušan Velkaverh	Mojmir Sepe

== Format ==
Following the confirmation of the twelve participating broadcasters, the draw to determine the running order of the contest was held on 15 January 1970.

The Dutch producers were forced to pad out the show for only twelve competing entries. The result was a format that has endured almost to the present day. An extended opening sequence filmed in Amsterdam set the scene, while every entry was introduced by a short video 'postcard' featuring each of the participating artists, ostensibly in their own country. However, the 'postcards' for Switzerland, Luxembourg, and Monaco were all filmed on location in Paris (as was the French postcard). The over four minutes long introduction film was followed by what probably is one of the shortest ever introductions by any presenter. Willy Dobbe only welcomed the viewers in English, French, and Dutch, finishing her introduction after only 24 seconds. On-screen captions introduced each entry, with the song titles listed all in lowercase and the names of the artist and composers/authors all in capitals.

The set design was devised by Roland de Groot; a simple design was composed of a number of curved horizontal bars and silver baubles which could be moved in a variety of different ways.

Due the four-way tie for first place in 1969, a tie-breaking rule was added to the rules for the first time. It stated that, if two or more songs gained the same number of votes and were tied for first place, each song would have to be performed again. After which each national jury (other than the juries of the countries concerned) would have a show of hands of which they thought was the best. If the countries tied again, then they would share first place.

== Contest overview ==
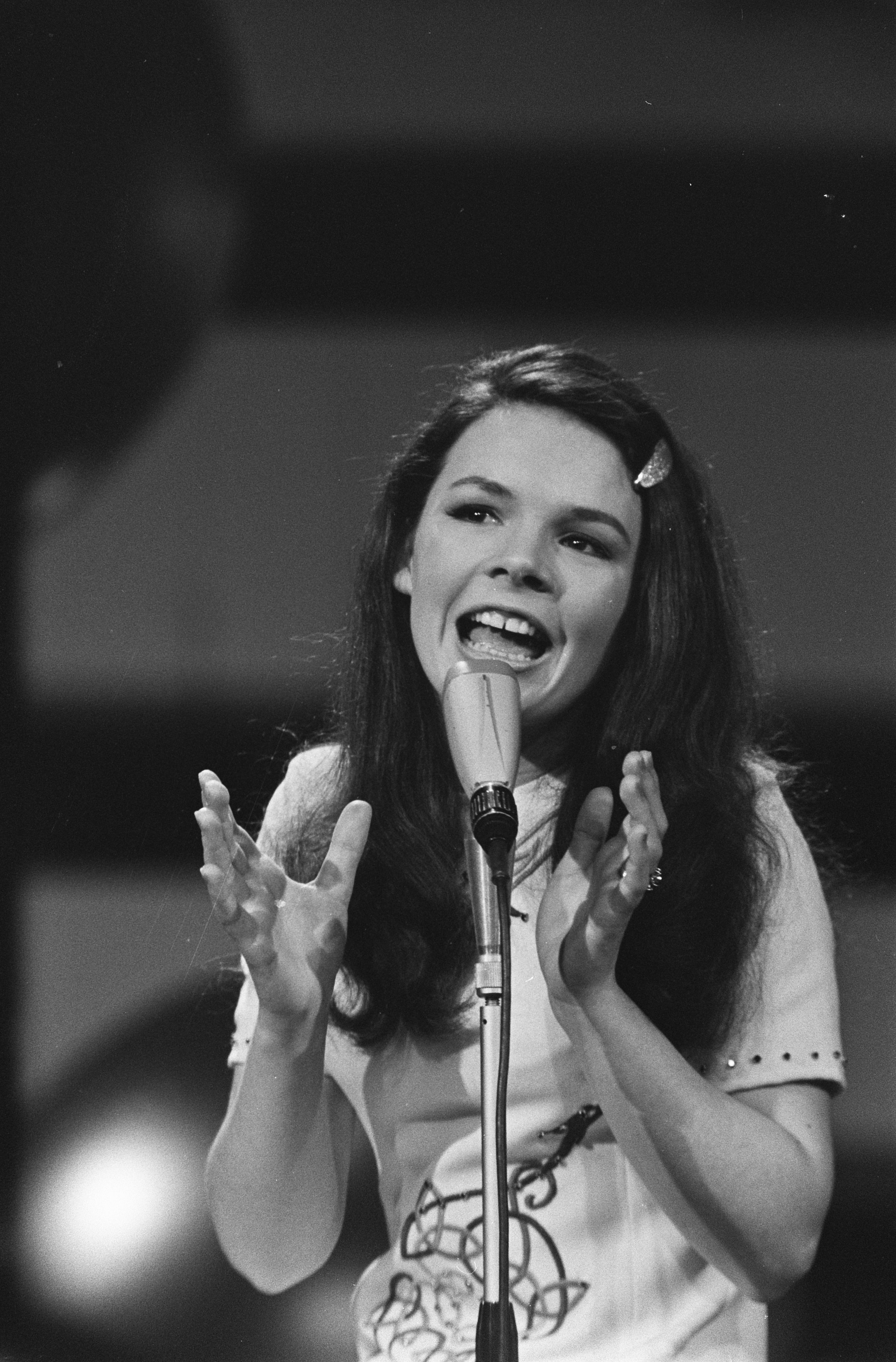
Dana sings the winning song "All Kinds of Everything"

Ireland won the contest with "All Kinds of Everything", penned by Derry Lindsay and Jackie Smith, and sung by another unknown, Dana, a 19-year-old schoolgirl from Derry, Northern Ireland. As the contest was held in the Netherlands this year, and the country was one of the four winners in 1969, Dana received her awards from the Dutch winner Lenny Kuhr.

Results of the Eurovision Song Contest 1970
R/O	Country	Artist	Song	Votes	Place
1	Netherlands	Patricia and Hearts of Soul	"Waterman"	7	7
2	Switzerland	Henri Dès	"Retour"	8	4
3	Italy	Gianni Morandi	"Occhi di ragazza"	5	8
4	Yugoslavia	Eva Sršen	"Pridi, dala ti bom cvet"	4	11
5	Belgium	Jean Vallée	"Viens l'oublier"	5	8
6	France	Guy Bonnet	"Marie-Blanche"	8	4
7	United Kingdom	Mary Hopkin	"Knock, Knock (Who's There?)"	26	2
8	Luxembourg	David Alexandre Winter	"Je suis tombé du ciel"	0	12
9	Spain	Julio Iglesias	"Gwendolyne"	8	4
10	Monaco	Dominique Dussault	"Marlène"	5	8
11	Germany	Katja Ebstein	"Wunder gibt es immer wieder"	12	3
12	Ireland	Dana	"All Kinds of Everything"	32	1

=== Spokespersons ===
Each participating broadcaster appointed a spokesperson who was responsible for announcing the votes for their respective country via telephone. Known spokespersons at the 1970 contest are listed below.

- Ireland – John Skehan
- Spain – Ramón Rivera
- United Kingdom – Colin Ward-Lewis

== Detailed voting results ==
Detailed voting results
		Total score	Netherlands	Switzerland	Italy	Yugoslavia	Belgium	France	United Kingdom	Luxembourg	Spain	Monaco	Germany	Ireland
Contestants	Netherlands	7			3	3			1					
Contestants	Switzerland	8	2					2	1				2	1
Contestants	Italy	5				1					2		2	
Contestants	Yugoslavia	4							4					
Contestants	Belgium	5						3		1				1
Contestants	France	8			1	2						2		3
Contestants	United Kingdom	26	3	2	2	4		2		2		4	4	3
Contestants	Luxembourg	0												
Contestants	Spain	8			3					2		3		
Contestants	Monaco	5		1			1	2			1			
Contestants	Germany	12		1	1					3	4	1		2
Contestants	Ireland	32	5	6			9	1	4	2	3		2	

== Broadcasts ==
Each participating broadcaster was required to relay the contest via its networks. Non-participating EBU member broadcasters were also able to relay the contest as "passive participants". Broadcasters were able to send commentators to provide coverage of the contest in their own native language and to relay information about the artists and songs to their television viewers.

In addition to the participating countries, the contest was reported to have been broadcast by EBU member broadcasters in Greece, Iceland, Israel, and Tunisia; in Bulgaria, Czechoslovakia, Hungary, Poland, Romania, and the Soviet Union via Intervision; and in Argentina, Brazil, and Chile. An estimated global audience of 400 million viewers was reported to have watched the contest. It was also known to broadcast on radio in countries including Ireland, Germany, Spain, and the United Kingdom. Known details on the broadcasts in each country, including the specific broadcasting stations and commentators are shown in the tables below.

Broadcasters and commentators in participating countries
Country	Broadcaster	Channel(s)	Commentator(s)	Ref(s)
Belgium	RTB	RTB, RTB 1		
Belgium	BRT	BRT	Jan Theys	
Belgium	BRT	BRT 2 Omroep Brabant	Rudi Sinia	
France	ORTF	Deuxième Chaîne	Pierre Tchernia	
Germany	ARD	Deutsches Fernsehen		
Germany	AFN	AFN-TV		
Ireland	RTÉ	RTÉ	Valerie McGovern	
Ireland	RTÉ	RTÉ Radio	Kevin Roche	
Italy	RAI	Secondo Programma TV	Renato Tagliani	
Luxembourg	CLT	Télé-Luxembourg		
Netherlands	NOS	Nederland 1	Pim Jacobs	
Spain	TVE	TVE 1	José Luis Uribarri	
Spain	RNE	RNE		
Spain	RNE	Centro Emisor del Atlántico		
Spain	RNE	Radio Peninsular de Barcelona		
Spain	Radio España			
Spain	Radio Juventud			
Spain	REM (Note: Simulcast on La Voz de Castellón, La Voz de Valladolid, and La Voz de Guipúzcoa.)			
Spain	Cadena SER (Note: Simulcast on Radio Castellón, Radio Rioja, Radio San Sebastián, Radio Sevilla, Radio Tarragona, and Radio Valladolid.)			
Switzerland	SRG SSR	TV DRS		
Switzerland	SRG SSR	TSR	Georges Hardy	
Switzerland	SRG SSR	TSI		
Switzerland	SRG SSR	Radio Beromünster (Note: Delayed broadcast on 23 March 1970 at 22:30 (CET))	Albert Werner	
Switzerland	SRG SSR	Radio Genève	Robert Burnier	
United Kingdom	BBC	BBC1	David Gell	
United Kingdom	BBC	BBC Radio 1 (Note: Simulcast on BBC Radio 2, BBC Radio Leicester, BBC Radio Durham, BBC Radio Merseyside, and BBC Radio Stoke-on-Trent.)	Tony Brandon	
United Kingdom	BFBS	BFBS Radio	John Russell	
Yugoslavia	JRT	Televizija Beograd, Televizija Zagreb	Oliver Mlakar	
Yugoslavia	JRT	Televizija Ljubljana	Sandi Čolnik	

Broadcasters and commentators in non-participating countries
Country	Broadcaster	Channel(s)	Commentator(s)	Ref(s)
Argentina	Canal 13 (Note: Delayed broadcast on 23 March at 21:30 (ART))		Cacho Fontana	
Austria	ORF	FS1	Ernst Grissemann	
Brazil	Rede Tupi	TV Brasília (Note: Deferred broadcast at 20:30 (BRT))		
Brazil	Rede Tupi	TV Paraná		
Brazil	Rede Tupi	TV Rádio Clube		
Chile	TVN (Note: Deferred broadcast at 20:20 (CLST))		Raúl Matas	
Czechoslovakia	ČST	ČST	Vladimír Dvořák and Ivan Úradníček	
Hungary	MTV	MTV		
Iceland	RÚV	Sjónvarpið (Note: Delayed broadcast on 4 April 1970 at 20:55 (WET))		
Israel	IBA	Israeli Television (Note: Delayed broadcast on 6 April 1970 at 19:35 (IST))		
Malta	MBA	MTS	Victor Aquilina	
Poland	TP	Telewizja Polska		
Romania	TVR	Programul 1 (Note: Delayed broadcast on 28 March 1970 at 21:10 (EET))		
