= Yugoslavia in the Eurovision Song Contest =

- Eurovision Song Contest
- (1961–1991) (1992)
- Former participating broadcaster: Yugoslav Radio Television (JRT)

Participation summary
- Appearances: 27
- First appearance: 1961
- Last appearance: 1992
- Highest placement: 1st: 1989
- Host: 1990
- Participation history: 1961; 1962; 1963; 1964; 1965; 1966; 1967; 1968; 1969; 1970; 1971; 1972; 1973; 1974; 1975; 1976; 1977; 1978; 1979; 1980; 1981; 1982; 1983; 1984; 1985; 1986; 1987; 1988; 1989; 1990; 1991; 1992
- Yugoslavia's page at Eurovision.com

Yugoslavia was represented at the Eurovision Song Contest 27 times, debuting in 1961 and competing every year until its last appearance in 1992, with the exceptions of 1977–1980, and 1985. The Yugoslavian participating broadcaster in the contest was Yugoslav Radio Television (JRT), which usually selected its entrant with a national final. Yugoslavia won the 1989 contest and hosted the 1990 contest.

"Neke davne zvezde" performed by Ljiljana Petrović was Yugoslavia's first entrant in the contest in 1961 and placed eighth. In the 1962 contest, "Ne pali svetla u sumrak" by Lola Novaković gave the country its first top five result, finishing fourth. This would remain Yugoslavia's only top five result until the 1983 contest, when "Džuli" by Danijel finished fourth. "Ja sam za ples" by Novi Fosili also finished fourth in the 1987 contest. In 1989, the country achieved its only victory in the contest, when "Rock Me" by Riva won.

== Participation ==
Yugoslav Radio Television (JRT) was a founding member of the European Broadcasting Union (EBU) in 1950 and therefore eligible to participate in the Eurovision Song Contest, representing the Socialist Federal Republic of Yugoslavia (SFR Yugoslavia), since the first contest in 1956. However, despite joining the Eurovision network in 1956, JRT didn't broadcast the contest until it debuted in 1961.

== History ==
=== 1961–1991: Socialist Federal Republic of Yugoslavia ===
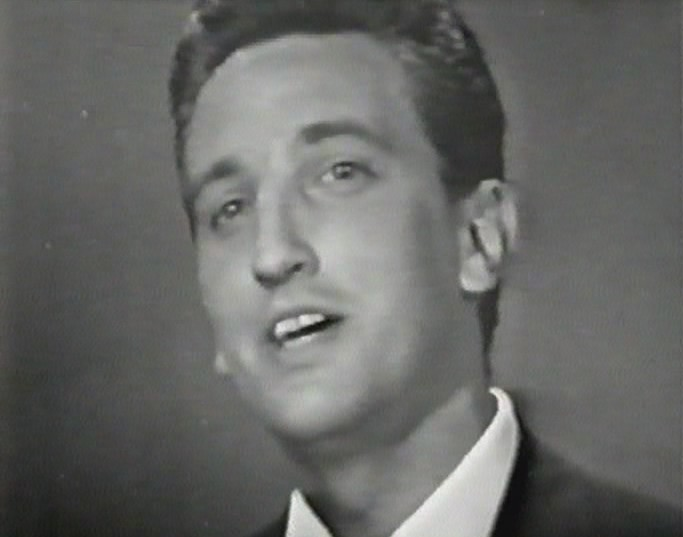
Vice Vukov performing "Čežnja" in Naples (1965)

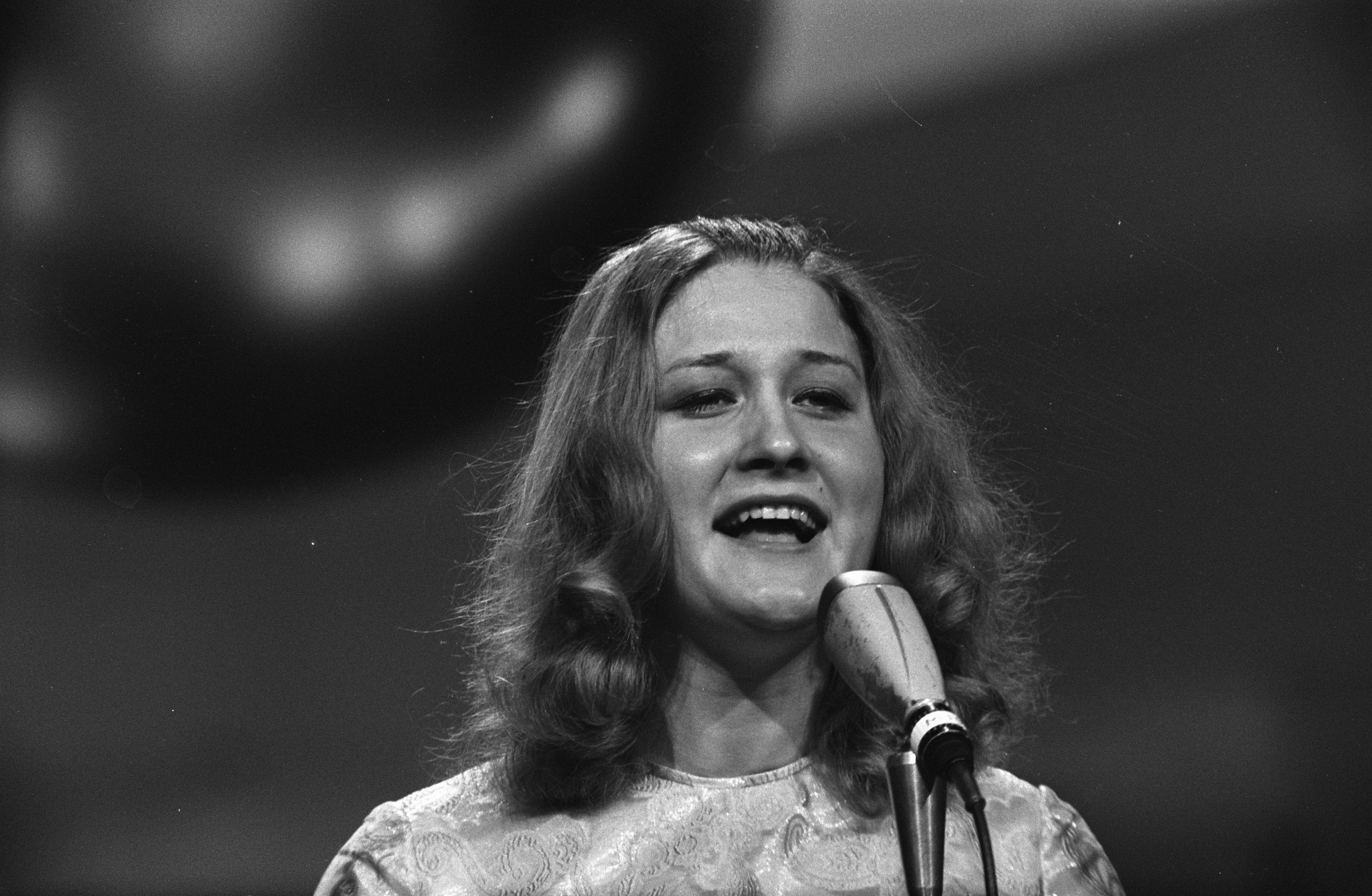
Eva Sršen performing "Pridi, dala ti bom cvet" in Amsterdam (1970)

Yugoslavia's first stretch of participations from 1961 until 1976 were mostly unsuccessful, with only one top five placing – fourth in 1962 – which would remain its best result until 1983. It also got its only last place in 1964. From 1969 until 1976, it consistently placed outside the top ten – with the exception of a ninth place in 1972 – ultimately coming second to last in 1976.

After a meeting on 4 July 1976, JRT announced its withdrawal from the 1977 contest, citing its low results. Its withdrawal continued into 1978 but JRT held a referendum among the readers of its RTV magazines on if it should return at the 1979 contest. Over 100,000 people voted in favour of returning to the contest, against just over 2,000 votes for staying out of the contest. However, JRT did not return in 1979 as the broadcaster and all its sub-national stations unanimously agreed against participating in Jerusalem – the host city that year – as they believed it to be illegally occupied and Yugoslavia did not have diplomatic relations with Israel at the time. JRT also did not broadcast the contest, despite doing so in 1977 and 1978. It did not participate in, or broadcast, the 1980 contest either for unknown reasons.

JRT returned to the contest in 1981 and participated four more times before withdrawing again. It continued to place outside the top ten in this period with the exception of 1983, where it matched its previous best result of fourth from 1962. After withdrawing in 1985, due to the contest colliding with the anniversary of the death of Yugoslav president Josip Broz Tito, it returned in 1986. It saw more success after its return, once again getting fourth place in 1987, followed by a sixth place in 1988.

As Yugoslavia won the 1989 contest with the song "Rock Me" by the group Riva, the 1990 contest took place in Zagreb, hosted by RTV Zagreb on behalf of JRT, as the entry came from them. JRT participated in 1991 for the last time representing SFR Yugoslavia.

=== 1992: Federal Republic of Yugoslavia ===
During the breakup of Yugoslavia in 1991, the former constituent republics of Croatia, Slovenia, and Macedonia declared secession and hence withdrew from the 1992 Yugoslav national final, while the then-leaderships of Serbia and Montenegro agreed to maintain a close alliance. On 28 March 1992, the broadcasters from the republics that still (at least formally) constituted the fading and shrunken former Yugoslav federation took part in the selection held in Belgrade. It included artists not only from Serbia and Montenegro, but also from Bosnia and Herzegovina, although the latter declared independence on 1 March of that year. Among its candidates was Alma Čardžić. The winner of that pre-selection was "Ljubim te pesmama" performed by Extra Nena (Snežana Berić) from Serbia. Before that year's contest took place, on 28 April, a new federal state was formed, consisting of Serbia and Montenegro and called the Federal Republic of Yugoslavia, which was represented by the previously mentioned "Ljubim te pesmama" by Extra Nena in the 1992 contest.

Only a few weeks after the 1992 contest, FR Yugoslavia was banned from participating in Eurovision due to UN sanctions during the Yugoslav Wars. However, the contest was still broadcast even under the sanctions except in 1999 due to the NATO bombing of RTS headquarters.

=== Successor states ===
Former JRT sub-national stations RTV Sarajevo in SR Bosnia and Herzegovina, RTV Zagreb in SR Croatia, RTV Skopje in SR Macedonia, and RTV Ljubljana in SR Slovenia became RTVBiH, HRT, MRT, and RTVSLO respectively in the new independent countries that emerged from the breakup of Yugoslavia, and were admitted into the EBU on 1 January 1993. Bosnia and Herzegovina, Croatia, and Slovenia made their debut in the 1993 contest, and North Macedonia (Note: Participating as the Former Yugoslav Republic of Macedonia (F.Y.R. Macedonia) until 2019.) made its debut in the 1998 contest, after having failed to progress from the qualifying round in the 1996 contest.

Former JRT stations RTV Titograd in SR Montenegro, and RTV Belgrade and RTV Novi Sad in SR Serbia, formed UJRT, the public broadcasting service of Serbia and Montenegro, which joined the EBU in 2001 and made its debut in the 2004 contest. Following the 2006 Montenegrin independence referendum, Montenegro and Serbia debuted as independent countries in the 2007 contest, after their respective broadcasters RTCG and RTS joined the EBU on their own. The Kosovan broadcaster, RTK – the successor to RTV Pristina, JRT sub-national station in SAP Kosovo – has been attempting to become a full member of the EBU since 2009 but has been unsuccessful.

== Participation overview ==
27 entries had represented Yugoslavia in the Eurovision Song Contest. 22 out of the 26 entries between 1961 and 1991 were in Serbo-Croatian and the rest in Slovene. No entry from Macedonia or Kosovo ever made it to the contest, illustrating a cultural marginalisation of the poorest parts of the country. Vojvodina also never had an entrant.

Table key
| 1 | First place |
| ◁ | Last place |

| Year | Artist | Song | Language | Place | Points |
|---|---|---|---|---|---|
| 1961 | Ljiljana Petrović | "Neke davne zvezde" (Неке давне звезде) | Serbo-Croatian | 8 | 9 |
| 1962 | Lola Novaković | "Ne pali svetla u sumrak" (Не пали светла у сумрак) | Serbo-Croatian | 4 | 10 |
| 1963 | Vice Vukov | "Brodovi" (Бродови) | Serbo-Croatian | 11 | 3 |
| 1964 | Sabahudin Kurt | "Život je sklopio krug" (Живот је склопио круг) | Serbo-Croatian | 13 ◁ | 0 |
| 1965 | Vice Vukov | "Čežnja" (Чежња) | Serbo-Croatian | 12 | 2 |
| 1966 | Berta Ambrož | "Brez besed" | Slovene | 7 | 9 |
| 1967 | Lado Leskovar | "Vse rože sveta" | Slovene | 8 | 7 |
| 1968 | Lući Kapurso and Hamo Hajdarhodžić | "Jedan dan" (Један дан) | Serbo-Croatian | 7 | 8 |
| 1969 | Ivan | "Pozdrav svijetu" (Поздрав свијету) | Serbo-Croatian | 13 | 5 |
| 1970 | Eva Sršen | "Pridi, dala ti bom cvet" | Slovene | 11 | 4 |
| 1971 | Krunoslav Slabinac | "Tvoj dječak je tužan" (Твој дјечак је тужан) | Serbo-Croatian | 14 | 68 |
| 1972 | Tereza | "Muzika i ti" (Музика и ти) | Serbo-Croatian | 9 | 87 |
| 1973 | Zdravko Čolić | "Gori vatra" (Гори ватра) | Serbo-Croatian | 15 | 65 |
| 1974 | Korni Grupa | "Generacija '42" (Генерација '42) | Serbo-Croatian | 12 | 6 |
| 1975 | Pepel in kri (Note: Credited as Ashes and Blood) | "Dan ljubezni" | Slovene | 13 | 22 |
| 1976 | Ambasadori | "Ne mogu skriti svoju bol" (Не могу скрити своју бол) | Serbo-Croatian | 17 | 10 |
| 1981 | Seid Memić Vajta | "Lejla" (Лејла) | Serbo-Croatian | 15 | 35 |
| 1982 | Aska | "Halo, halo" (Хало, хало) | Serbo-Croatian | 14 | 21 |
| 1983 | Daniel | "Džuli" (Џули) | Serbo-Croatian | 4 | 125 |
| 1984 | Ida and Vlado | "Ciao, amore" | Serbo-Croatian | 18 | 26 |
| 1986 | Doris | "Željo moja" (Жељо моја) | Serbo-Croatian | 11 | 49 |
| 1987 | Novi fosili | "Ja sam za ples" (Ја сам за плес) | Serbo-Croatian | 4 | 92 |
| 1988 | Srebrna krila (Note: Credited as Silver Wings) | "Mangup" (Мангуп) | Serbo-Croatian | 6 | 87 |
| 1989 | Riva | "Rock Me" | Serbo-Croatian | 1 | 137 |
| 1990 | Tajči | "Hajde da ludujemo" (Хајде да лудујемо) | Serbo-Croatian | 7 | 81 |
| 1991 | Baby Doll | "Brazil" (Бразил) | Serbo-Croatian | 21 | 1 |
| 1992 | Extra Nena | "Ljubim te pesmama" (Љубим те песмама) | Serbian | 13 | 44 |

== Hostings ==
| Year | Location | Venue | Executive producer | Director | Musical director | Presenter | Ref. |
|---|---|---|---|---|---|---|---|
| 1990 | Zagreb | Vatroslav Lisinski Concert Hall | Goran Radman | Nenad Puhovski | Seadeta Midžić | Helga Vlahović and Oliver Mlakar | |

== Related involvement ==
=== Conductors ===
Conductors
| Year | Conductor | Ref. |
|---|---|---|
| 1961 | Jože Privšek | |
| 1962 | Jože Privšek | |
| 1963 | Miljenko Prohaska | |
| 1964 | Radivoje Spasić | |
| 1965 | Radivoje Spasić | |
| 1966 | Mojmir Sepe | |
| 1967 | Mario Rijavec | |
| 1968 | Miljenko Prohaska | |
| 1969 | Miljenko Prohaska | |
| 1970 | Mojmir Sepe | |
| 1971 | Miljenko Prohaska | |
| 1972 | Nikica Kalogjera | |
| 1973 | Esad Arnautalić | |
| 1974 | Zvonimir Skerl | |
| 1975 | Mario Rijavec | |
| 1976 | Esad Arnautalić | |
| 1981 | Ranko Rihtman | |
| 1982 | Zvonimir Skerl | |
| 1983 | Radovan Papović | |
| 1984 | Mato Došen | |
| 1986 | Nikica Kalogjera | |
| 1987 | Nikica Kalogjera | |
| 1988 | Nikica Kalogjera | |
| 1989 | Nikica Kalogjera | |
| 1990 | Stjepan Mihajlinec | |
| 1991 | Slobodan Marković | |
| 1992 | Anders Berglund (Note: Entry conducted by the host country's musical director) | |

=== Commentators and spokespersons ===
The contest has been also known to have aired on Yugoslav radio stations, including Radio Beograd 1 in 1961 and 1990, Radio Beograd 202 in 1992, Val 202 in 1961, 1986 and 1990 and Radio Zagreb 1 in 1990.

Television broadcasts, commentators and spokespersons from the Socialist Federal Republic of Yugoslavia
| Year | Channel | | | | | | | | | Commentator(s) | Spokesperson | Ref. |
| Year | SR Slovenia | | SR Croatia | SR Bosnia and Herzegovina | SAP Vojvodina | SR Serbia | SAP Kosovo | SR Montenegro | SR Macedonia | Commentator(s) | Spokesperson | Ref. |
| Year | RTV Ljubljana (Note: RTV Slovenia in 1991) | | RTV Zagreb (Note: HRT in 1991) | RTV Sarajevo | RTV Novi Sad | RTV Beograd | RTV Prishtina | RTV Titograd (Note: RTCG in 1991) | RTV Skopje | Commentator(s) | Spokesperson | Ref. |
|---|---|---|---|---|---|---|---|---|---|---|---|---|
| 1961 | Televizija Ljubljana | Launched in 1971 | Televizija Zagreb | Launched in 1961 | Launched in 1975 | Televizija Beograd | Launched in 1975 | Launched in 1964 | Launched in 1964 | Serbo-Croatian: Saša Novak | Unknown | |
| 1962 | Televizija Ljubljana | Launched in 1971 | Televizija Zagreb | Unknown | Launched in 1975 | Televizija Beograd | Launched in 1975 | Launched in 1964 | Launched in 1964 | Unknown | Unknown | |
| 1963 | Televizija Ljubljana | Launched in 1971 | Televizija Zagreb | Unknown | Launched in 1975 | Televizija Beograd | Launched in 1975 | Launched in 1964 | Launched in 1964 | Serbo-Croatian: Saša Novak | Unknown | |
| 1964 | Televizija Ljubljana | Launched in 1971 | Televizija Zagreb | Unknown | Launched in 1975 | Televizija Beograd | Launched in 1975 | Launched in 1964 | Launched in 1964 | Unknown | Unknown | |
| 1965 | Televizija Ljubljana | Launched in 1971 | Televizija Zagreb | Unknown | Launched in 1975 | Televizija Beograd | Launched in 1975 | Unknown | Unknown | Unknown | Unknown | |
| 1966 | Televizija Ljubljana | Launched in 1971 | Televizija Zagreb | Unknown | Launched in 1975 | Televizija Beograd | Launched in 1975 | Unknown | Unknown | Unknown | Unknown | |
| 1967 | Televizija Ljubljana | Launched in 1971 | Televizija Zagreb | Unknown | Launched in 1975 | Televizija Beograd | Launched in 1975 | Unknown | Unknown | Unknown | Unknown | |
| 1968 | Televizija Ljubljana | Launched in 1971 | Televizija Zagreb | Unknown | Launched in 1975 | Televizija Beograd | Launched in 1975 | Unknown | Unknown | Unknown | Unknown | |
| 1969 | Televizija Ljubljana | Launched in 1971 | Televizija Zagreb | Unknown | Launched in 1975 | Televizija Beograd | Launched in 1975 | Unknown | Unknown | Unknown | Višnja Trputec | |
| 1970 | Televizija Ljubljana | Launched in 1971 | Televizija Zagreb | Unknown | Launched in 1975 | Televizija Beograd | Launched in 1975 | Unknown | Unknown | Serbo-Croatian: Oliver Mlakar; Slovene: Sandi Čolnik | Unknown | |
| 1971 | Televizija Ljubljana | Launched in 1971 | Televizija Zagreb | Unknown | Launched in 1975 | Televizija Beograd | Launched in 1975 | Unknown | TV Skopje | Unknown | No spokesperson | |
| 1972 | Televizija Ljubljana | TV Koper-Capodistria | Televizija Zagreb | Unknown | Launched in 1975 | Televizija Beograd | Launched in 1975 | Unknown | Unknown | Serbo-Croatian: Oliver Mlakar | No spokesperson | |
| 1973 | TV Ljubljana 1 | TV Koper-Capodistria | TV Zagreb 1 | Unknown | Launched in 1975 | TV Beograd 1 | Launched in 1975 | Unknown | TV Skopje | Unknown | No spokesperson | |
| 1974 | TV Ljubljana 1 | TV Koper-Capodistria | TV Zagreb 1 | Unknown | Launched in 1975 | TV Beograd 1 | Launched in 1975 | Unknown | Unknown | Unknown | Helga Vlahović | |
| 1975 | TV Ljubljana 1 | TV Koper-Capodistria | TV Zagreb 1 | TV Sarajevo | Launched in 1975 | TV Beograd 1 | Launched in 1975 | Unknown | TV Skopje | Unknown | Unknown | |
| 1976 | TV Ljubljana 1 | TV Koper-Capodistria | TV Zagreb 1 | Unknown | No broadcast | TV Beograd 1 | Unknown | Unknown | Unknown | Serbo-Croatian: Oliver Mlakar | Unknown | |
| 1977 | TV Ljubljana 1 | TV Koper-Capodistria | TV Zagreb 1 | Unknown | No broadcast | TV Beograd 1 | Unknown | Unknown | Unknown | Unknown | Did not participate | |
| 1978 | TV Ljubljana 1 | TV Koper-Capodistria | TV Zagreb 1 | Unknown | No broadcast | TV Beograd 1 | Unknown | Unknown | Unknown | Unknown | Did not participate | |
| 1979 | No broadcast | | | | | | | | | | Did not participate | |
| 1980 | No broadcast | | | | | | | | | | Did not participate | N/A |
| 1981 | TV Ljubljana 1 | No broadcast | TV Zagreb 1 | Unknown | TV Novi Sad | TV Beograd 1 | TV Prishtina | Unknown | Unknown | Serbo-Croatian: Minja Subota and Helga Vlahović | Helga Vlahović | |
| 1982 | TV Ljubljana 1 | TV Koper-Capodistria | TV Zagreb 1 | Unknown | TV Novi Sad | TV Beograd 1 | Unknown | Unknown | Unknown | Serbo-Croatian: Oliver Mlakar | Unknown | |
| 1983 | TV Ljubljana 1 | No broadcast | TV Zagreb 1 | Unknown | TV Novi Sad | TV Beograd 1 | TV Prishtina | Unknown | Unknown | Serbo-Croatian: Oliver Mlakar | Unknown | |
| 1984 | TV Ljubljana 1 | TV Koper-Capodistria | TV Zagreb 1 | Unknown | TV Novi Sad | TV Beograd 1 | TV Prishtina | TV Titograd 1 | TV Skopje 1 | Serbo-Croatian: Oliver Mlakar | Unknown | |
| 1985 | No broadcast | | | | | | | | | | Did not participate | N/A |
| 1986 | TV Ljubljana 1 | TV Koper-Capodistria | TV Zagreb 1 | TV Sarajevo 1 | TV Novi Sad | TV Beograd 1 | TV Prishtina | TV Titograd 1 | TV Skopje 1 | Serbo-Croatian: Ksenija Urličić | Unknown | |
| 1987 | TV Ljubljana 1 | TV Koper-Capodistria | TV Zagreb 1 | TV Sarajevo 1 | TV Novi Sad | TV Beograd 1 | TV Prishtina | TV Titograd 1 | TV Skopje 1 | Serbo-Croatian: Ksenija Urličić; Slovene: Vesna Pfeifer | Ljiljana Tipsarević | |
| 1988 | TV Ljubljana 1 | No broadcast | TV Zagreb 1 | TV Sarajevo 1 | TV Novi Sad | TV Beograd 1 | TV Prishtina | Unknown | Unknown | Serbo-Croatian: Oliver Mlakar | Miša Molk | |
| 1989 | TV Ljubljana 1 | No broadcast | TV Zagreb 1 | Unknown | TV Novi Sad | TV Beograd 1 | TV Prishtina | Unknown | TV Skopje 1 | Serbo-Croatian: Oliver Mlakar | Unknown | |
| 1990 | TV Ljubljana 1 | No broadcast | TV Zagreb 1 | Unknown | TV Novi Sad | TV Beograd 1 | TV Prishtina | Unknown | Unknown | Unknown | Unknown | |
| 1991 | TV Ljubljana 1 | No broadcast | HTV 1 (Note: The 1991 contest was broadcast delayed by Hrvatska televizija due to nationwide mourning within Croatia following the deaths of Croatian police officers, as part of the wider Croatian War of Independence) | TV Sarajevo 1 | TV Novi Sad | TV Beograd 1 | TV Prishtina | TV Titograd 1 | TV Skopje 1 | Croatian: Ksenija Urličić (Note: Due to division among the JRT member broadcasters, two commentators provided commentary in 1991; Croatian commentary provided by Hrvatska televizija was broadcast in Croatia, Bosnia and Herzegovina, Macedonia, and Slovenia, while Serbian commentary provided by Televizija Beograd was broadcast in Kosovo, Montenegro, Serbia, and Vojvodina.); Serbian: Mladen Popović | Unknown | |

Television broadcasts, commentators and spokespersons from the Federal Republic of Yugoslavia
| Year | Channel | | Commentator(s) | Spokesperson | Ref. |
| Year | Serbia | Montenegro | Commentator(s) | Spokesperson | Ref. |
| Year | RTS | RTCG | Commentator(s) | Spokesperson | Ref. |
|---|---|---|---|---|---|
| 1992 | TV Beograd 1, TV Novi Sad 1 | Unknown | Mladen Popović | Unknown | |
| 1993 | RTS B2 | Unknown | Unknown | Did not participate | |
| 1994 | RTS 3K | Unknown | Unknown | Did not participate | |
| 1995 | RTS 3K | Unknown | Unknown | Did not participate | |
| 1996 | RTS 2 | Unknown | Unknown | Did not participate | |
| 1997 | RTS 2 | Unknown | Unknown | Did not participate | |
| 1998 | RTS 3K | Unknown | Unknown | Did not participate | |
| 1999 | Unknown | Unknown | Unknown | Did not participate | |
| 2000 | RTS 3K | Unknown | Unknown | Did not participate | |
| 2001 | YU Info | Unknown | Unknown | Did not participate | |
| 2002 | RTS 2 | Unknown | Unknown | Did not participate | |

== See also ==
- Yugoslav pop and rock scene

Participation of successor states in Eurovision

- Bosnia and Herzegovina in the Eurovision Song Contest
- Croatia in the Eurovision Song Contest
- Montenegro in the Eurovision Song Contest
- North Macedonia in the Eurovision Song Contest
- Serbia in the Eurovision Song Contest
- Serbia and Montenegro in the Eurovision Song Contest
- Slovenia in the Eurovision Song Contest
