= Yugoslavia in the Eurovision Song Contest 1970 =

- Eurovision Song Contest 1970
- Participating broadcaster: Jugoslavenska radiotelevizija (JRT)
- Country: Yugoslavia
- Selection process: Jugovizija 1970
- Selection date: 14 February 1970

Competing entry
- Song: "Pridi, dala ti bom cvet"
- Artist: Eva Sršen
- Songwriters: Mojmir Sepe; Dušan Velkaverh

Placement
- Final result: 11th, 4 points

Participation chronology

Yugoslavia was represented at the Eurovision Song Contest 1970 with the song "Pridi, dala ti bom cvet", composed by Mojmir Sepe, with lyrics by Dušan Velkaverh, and performed by Eva Sršen. The Yugoslav participating broadcaster, Jugoslavenska radiotelevizija (JRT), selected its entry through Jugovizija 1970.

== Before Eurovision ==
=== Jugovizija 1970 ===
The Yugoslav national final to select their entry, was held on 14 February at the RTV Belgrade studios in Belgrade. The host was Mića Orlović. There were 15 songs in the final, from the five subnational public broadcasters; RTV Ljubljana, RTV Zagreb, RTV Belgrade, RTV Sarajevo, and RTV Skopje. The winner was chosen by the votes of a mixed jury of experts and citizens, one juror from each of the subnational public broadcasters of JRT, and three non-experts — citizens. The winning song was "Pridi, dala ti bom cvet" performed by the Slovene singer Eva Sršen, written by Dušan Velkaverh and composed by Mojmir Sepe.

Final – 14 February 1970
R/O	Broadcaster	Artist	Song	Points	Place
1	(Socialist Republic of Serbia) RTV Belgrade	Boba Stefanović	"Nada i bol"	0	10
2	(Socialist Republic of Serbia) RTV Belgrade	Bisera Veletanlić	"Ti nisi kao ja"	1	9
3	(Socialist Republic of Serbia) RTV Belgrade	Radojka Šverko	"Ti si ukleta lađa"	8	4
4	(Socialist Republic of Slovenia) RTV Ljubljana	Bele Vrane	"Hvala ti"	10	3
5	(Socialist Republic of Slovenia) RTV Ljubljana	Eva Sršen	"Pridi, dala ti bom cvet"	26	1
6	(Socialist Republic of Slovenia) RTV Ljubljana	Marjana Deržaj	"Sreča je spati na svojem"	0	10
7	(Socialist Republic of Bosnia and Herzegovina) RTV Sarajevo	Nedžad Salković	"Čuj me"	3	6
8	(Socialist Republic of Bosnia and Herzegovina) RTV Sarajevo	Mišo Kovač	"Idi, samo idi"	3	6
9	(Socialist Republic of Bosnia and Herzegovina) RTV Sarajevo	Hamdija Čustović	"Pomirenje"	0	10
10	(Socialist Republic of Macedonia) RTV Skopje	Krunoslav Slabinac	"Anđela, čekaj me"	5	5
11	(Socialist Republic of Macedonia) RTV Skopje	Zoran Milosavljević	"Te baram sega, ljubena"	0	10
12	(Socialist Republic of Macedonia) RTV Skopje	Zafir Hadžimanov	"Ti, ti, ti"	0	10
13	(Socialist Republic of Croatia) RTV Zagreb	Ljupka Dimitrovska	"Bay, bay"	3	6
14	(Socialist Republic of Croatia) RTV Zagreb	Josipa Lisac	"Još te čekam"	22	2
15	(Socialist Republic of Croatia) RTV Zagreb	Inge Romac	"Ljubav je lipa stvar"	0	10

== At Eurovision ==
The contest was broadcast on Televizija Beograd, and Televizija Zagreb, both with commentary by Oliver Mlakar, as well as Televizija Ljubljana, with commentary by Sandi Čolnik

Eva Sršen performed 4th on the night of the Contest, following Italy and preceding Belgium. At the close of the voting the song had received 4 points (all from United Kingdom), coming 11th in the field of 12 competing countries.

=== Voting ===
Points awarded to Yugoslavia
Score	Country
4 points	United Kingdom

Points awarded by Yugoslavia
Score	Country
4 points	United Kingdom
3 points	Netherlands
2 points	France
1 point	Italy
