= Switzerland in the Eurovision Song Contest 1970 =

- Eurovision Song Contest 1970
- Participating broadcaster: Swiss Broadcasting Corporation (SRG SSR)
- Country: Switzerland
- Selection process: Internal selection
- Announcement date: 24 February 1970

Competing entry
- Song: "Retour"
- Artist: Henri Dès
- Songwriter: Henri Dès

Placement
- Final result: 4th, 8 votes

Participation chronology

Switzerland was represented at the Eurovision Song Contest 1970 with the song "Retour", written and performed by Henri Dès. The Swiss participating broadcaster, the Swiss Broadcasting Corporation (SRG SSR), internally selected its entry for the contest. The song, performed in position 2, placed fourth –tying with the songs from France and Spain– out of twelve competing entries with 8 votes.

== Before Eurovision ==
=== Internal selection ===
The Swiss Broadcasting Corporation (SRG SSR) continued to internally select its entry for the Eurovision Song Contest 1970 after doing so in 1969. Not much information has been reported regarding the internal selection, but it is known that at least two rounds took place.

The first round took place in Lugano sometime around 12 January 1970, where jurors shortlisted four songs to compete in the final round out of an unknown total of submissions. Among the reported artists in this round were Arlette Zola— who would go on to represent Switzerland in 1982, Francine, George Metro, Henri Dès, and Peggy March.

The final round took place in February in Bern. Along with Henri Dès, Francine was also reported to be a shortlisted artist. The other two artists remain unknown. The jury consisted of Swiss television directors and entertainment professionals.

On 24 February, it was first reported the internal jury had selected "Retour" written and performed by Henri Dès. From 3-8 March, Francine competed in the Golden Stag Festival 1970 with her song "La Vie du bon côté".

Internal selection final stage (known songs) – February 1970
Artist	Song	Language	Songwriter(s)	
Artist	Song	Language	Composer(s)	Lyricist
Henri Dès	"Retour"	French	Henri Dès	
Francine	"La Vie du bon côté"	French	Fernando Paggi; Nala	Francine-Renée Racheter

=== Releases ===
"Retour" by Henri Dès was first recorded and released on a single 1970. The song was also released in singles in English as "Return" and Spanish as "A Mi Regreso" that same year. In 1998, the song was featured in a CD compilation titled "Concours Eurovision De La Chanson 1956-1998: Schweizer Beiträge", which compiled every Swiss Eurovision entry at the time.

Francine would also record and release "Mon clown à moi" in a single that same year.

== At Eurovision ==
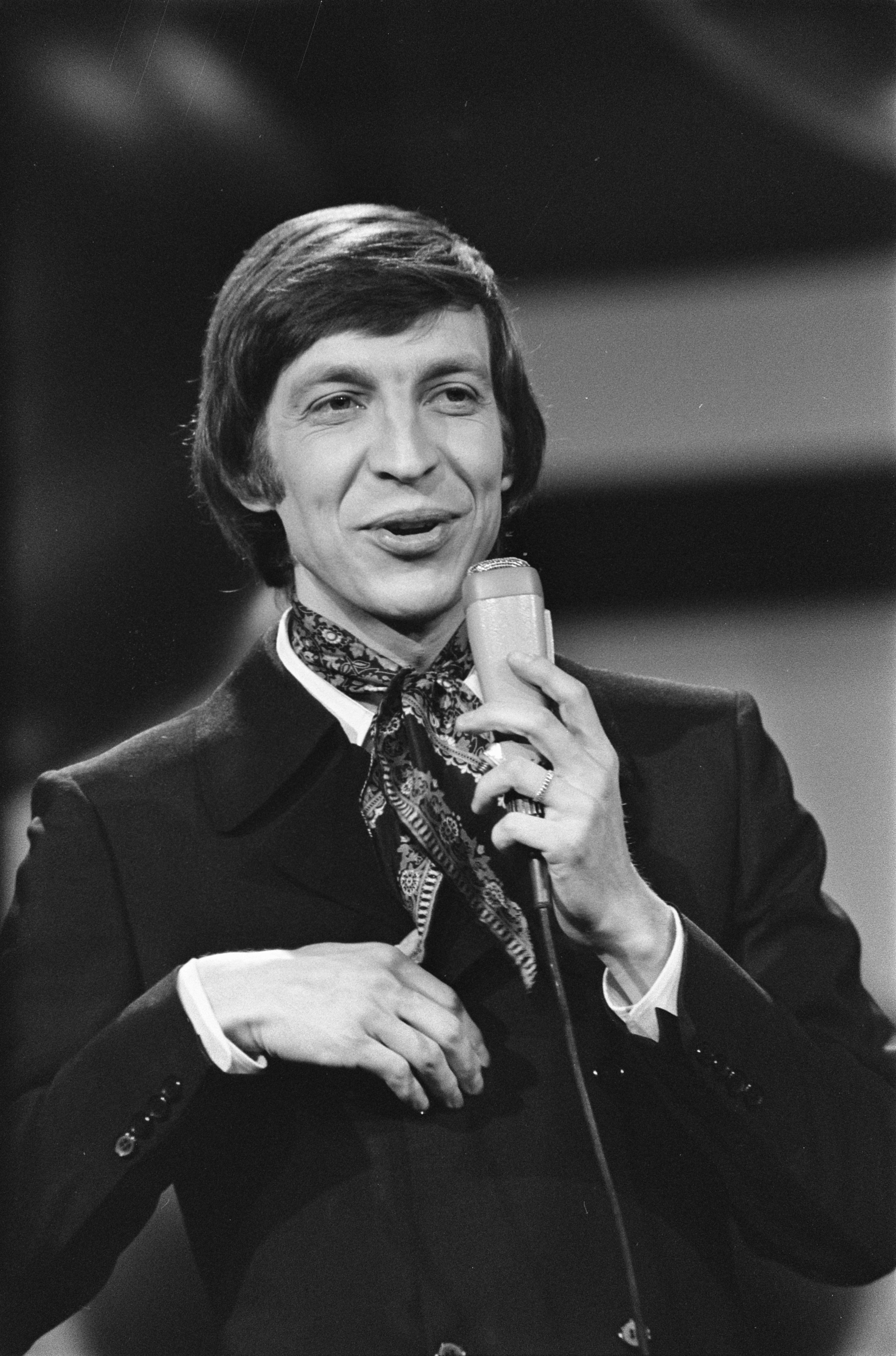
Henri Dès performing in the Eurovision Song Contest 1970

At the Eurovision Song Contest 1970 in Amsterdam, the Swiss entry was the second song of the evening following the Netherlands and preceding Italy. It was conducted by Bernard Gérard. At the close of voting, Switzerland had received 8 votes and finished fourth among the twelve participants, tying with France and Spain.

The contest was broadcast on SRG SSR via TV DRS and Radio Beromünster (Note: Delayed broadcast on 23 March 1970 at 22:30 (CET)) (with commentary from Albert Werner) in German-speaking Switzerland, TSR (with commentary from Georges Hardy) and Radio Genève (with commentary from Robert Burnier) in Romandy, and TSI in Ticino.

=== Voting ===
Each participating broadcaster assembled a ten-member jury panel. Every jury member could give one vote to their favourite song.

Votes awarded to Switzerland
Score	Country
2 votes	France; Germany; Netherlands
1 vote	Ireland; United Kingdom

Votes awarded by Switzerland
Score	Country
6 votes	Ireland
2 votes	United Kingdom
1 vote	Germany; Monaco
