= Occhi di ragazza =

1970 song by Gianni Morandi

Single by Gianni Morandi
- Language: Italian
- Released: 1970
- Composer: Lucio Dalla
- Lyricists: Sergio Bardotti; Gianfranco Baldazzi

Eurovision Song Contest 1970 entry
- Country: Italy
- Artist: Gianluigi Morandi
- As: Gianni Morandi
- Language: Italian
- Composer: Lucio Dalla
- Lyricists: Sergio Bardotti; Gianfranco Baldazzi

Finals performance
- Final result: 8th
- Final points: 5

Entry chronology
- ◄ "Due grosse lacrime bianche" (1969)
- "L'amore è un attimo" (1971) ►

"Occhi di ragazza" ("Girl's eyes") is a song written by Lucio Dalla, Sergio Bardotti, and Gianfranco Baldazzi, and performed by Gianni Morandi. It represented Italy in the Eurovision Song Contest 1970.

== Background ==
The ballad was initially chosen by singer Ron to be presented at the 1970 Sanremo Music Festival, but was rejected by the Selection Jury. Morandi then to led it to success, and the song became a staple of his live repertoire. The song was also important for Lucio Dalla, who had composed the song's music, as its success gave him visibility and propelled his career.

== At Eurovision ==
The song was performed third on the night, following Switzerland's Henri Dès with "Retour" and preceding Yugoslavia's Eva Sršen with "Pridi, dala ti bom cvet". At the close of voting, it had received 5 points, placing it 8th in a field of 12.

It was succeeded as Italian representative at the 1971 contest by Massimo Ranieri with "L'amore è un attimo".

== Charts ==
Chart (1970)	Peak position
Italy (Musica e dischi)	5

== Cover versions ==
Cover versions of the song include those by Lucio Dalla, Ron and Ornella Vanoni. An English version of the song titled "Eyes of a Child" was recorded by the Italo-Australian performer Tony Pantano, while Laila Nyström recorded a Swedish version of the song titled "Någonting att minnas".
