= Germany in the Eurovision Song Contest 1970 =

- Eurovision Song Contest 1970
- Participating broadcaster: ARD (Note: Arbeitsgemeinschaft der öffentlich-rechtlichen Rundfunkanstalten der Bundesrepublik Deutschland) – Hessischer Rundfunk (HR)
- Country: Germany
- Selection process: Ein Lied für Amsterdam
- Selection date: 16 February 1970

Competing entry
- Song: "Wunder gibt es immer wieder"
- Artist: Katja Ebstein
- Songwriters: Christian Bruhn; Günter Loose

Placement
- Final result: 3rd, 12 points

Participation chronology

Germany was represented at the Eurovision Song Contest 1970 with the song "Wunder gibt es immer wieder", composed by Christian Bruhn, with lyrics by Günter Loose, and performed by Katja Ebstein. The German participating broadcaster on behalf of ARD, Hessischer Rundfunk (HR), selected its entry through a national final. This was the first of Ebstein's three appearances for Germany at Eurovision; she returned in 1971 and 1980.

== Before Eurovision ==
=== Ein Lied für Amsterdam ===
The final was held at the TV studios in Frankfurt, hosted by Marie-Louise Steinbauer. Six songs took part and were voted on in two stages by a 7-member jury. In the first round each judge awarded 1 point to their three favourite songs, and the lowest-scoring three were eliminated. The judges were then asked to award 1 point to their favourite of the three remaining songs, and "Wunder gibt es immer wieder" was the unanimous choice. Other participants included future German representative Mary Roos and three-time Norwegian performer Kirsti Sparboe.

Ein Lied für Amsterdam – first round
R/O	Artist	Song	Votes	Place	Result
1	Mary Roos	"Bei jedem Kuß"	5	2	Advanced
2	Roberto Blanco	"Auf dem Kurfürstendamm sagt man "Liebe""	1	5	—N/a
3	Kirsti Sparboe	"Pierre, der Clochard"	3	4	—N/a
4	Peter Beil	"Blaue Augen, rote Lippen und kastanienbraunes Haar"	0	6	—N/a
5	Katja Ebstein	"Wunder gibt es immer wieder"	7	1	Advanced
6	Reiner Schöne	"Allein unter Millionen"	5	2	Advanced

Ein Lied für Amsterdam – second round
Artist	Song	Votes	Place
Mary Roos	"Bei jedem Kuß"	0	2
Katja Ebstein	"Wunder gibt es immer wieder"	7	1
Reiner Schöne	"Allein unter Millionen"	0	2

== At Eurovision ==
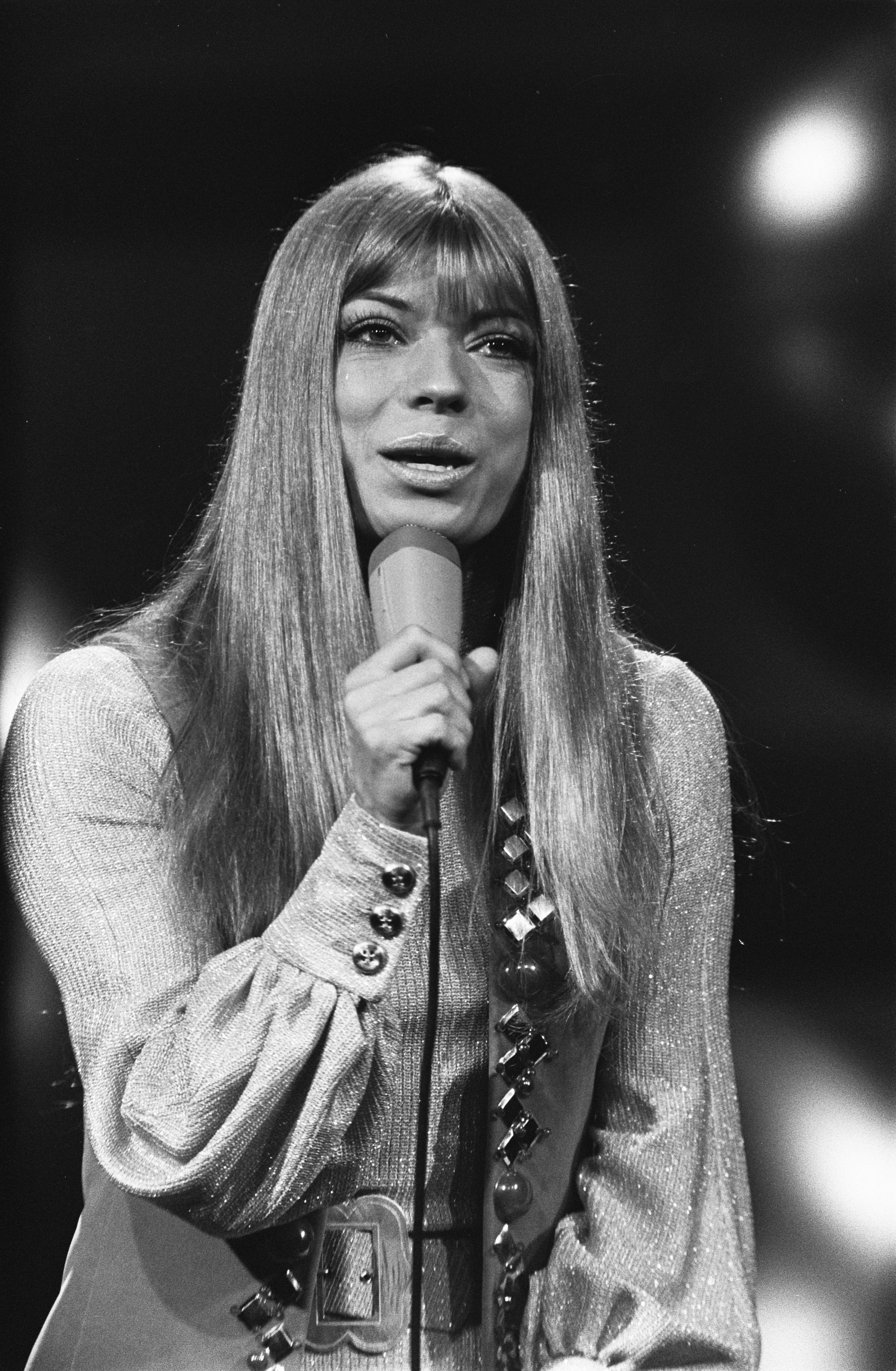
Katja Ebstein at Eurovision

On the night of the final Ebstein performed 11th in the running order, following Monaco and preceding eventual contest winners Ireland. Along with the Dutch entry, the song was the most contemporary of the evening and Ebstein gave a strong, confident performance which was enthusiastically received by the audience. At the close of voting "Wunder gibt es immer wieder" received 12 points (the highest being 4 from Spain), placing Germany third of the 12 entries, albeit well behind Ireland and runners-up the United Kingdom who had scored 32 and 26 points respectively. This was at the time Germany's highest placement at Eurovision. The German jury awarded its highest mark of 4 to the United Kingdom.

=== Voting ===
Points awarded to Germany
Score	Country
4 points	Spain
3 points	Luxembourg
2 points	Ireland
1 point	Italy; Monaco; Switzerland

Points awarded by Germany
Score	Country
4 points	United Kingdom
2 points	Ireland; Italy; Switzerland
