= Mojmir Sepe =

Slovene conductor and composer (1930–2020)

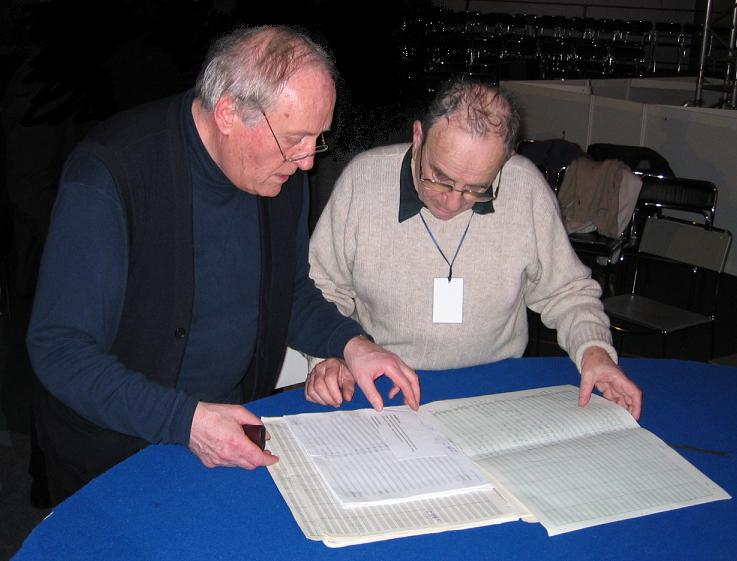
- Sepe (left) with Dušan Hren in 2005

Background information
- Also known as: Mojzes
- Born: 11 July 1930; Jazbina, Črna na Koroškem, Kingdom of Yugoslavia
- Died: 24 December 2020 (aged 90)
- Occupations: composer; conductor; trumpeter; arranger
- Years active: 1950–2020
- Spouse: Majda Bernard (m. 1956; died 2006)

Mojmir "Mojzes" Sepe (11 July 1930 – 24 December 2020) was a Slovenian composer, conductor, arranger and trumpeter.

== Career ==
The son of opera singer Franc Schiffrer, Sepe graduated from Celje First Grammar School (gymnasium) in Celje in 1949. He later studied piano and trumpet at Ljubljana Academy of Music.

In 1950, he started his professional music career as a promising trumpet player at Radio Ljubljana Dance Orchestra. He also established the jazz Mojmir Sepe Band (Ansambel Mojmirja Sepeta), which published one of the first jazz vinyl records in socialist Yugoslavia. His trumpet career ended after an altercation at Opatija Festival '65 when four guys knocked out a couple of his front teeth as he defended her from having her purse stolen. He committed to composing and conducting, mostly influenced by jazz and swing music.

He collaborated with several Slovenian poets who wrote lyrics for his arrangements. Among them were Frane Milčinski Ježek, Gregor Strniša, Branko Šomen, Miroslav Košuta, and Ivan Minatti.

== Hit songs ==
- 1962 — "Zemlja pleše" by Marjana Deržaj
- 1964 — "Poletna noč" by Majda Sepe
- 1966 — "Brez besed" by Berta Ambrož
- 1969 — "Ljubi, ljubi, ljubi" by Eva Sršen
- 1970 — "Pridi, dala ti bom cvet" by Eva Sršen
- 1972 — "Med iskrenimi ljudmi" by Majda Sepe
- 1978 — "Ribič, ribič me je ujel" by Majda Sepe
- 1978 — Bojan the Bear (cartoon instrumental theme)

== Brez besed vs. Eres tú plagiarism ==
Eres tú, the Spanish entry in the 1973 Eurovision Song Contest, has been accused of being a plagiarism of the Slovenian song "Brez besed" performed by Berta Ambrož and representing Yugoslavia at the 1966 Eurovision Song Contest. Brez Besed was written by Sepe himself and lyricist Elza Budau, both Slovenians. However, Sepe and Budau never officially complained or filed a lawsuit against Eres Tú composer Juan Carlos Calderón, and therefore nothing further happened.

== Eurovision ==
Sepe represented Yugoslavia two times as composer.

Year	Song	Artist	Lyricist	Place
1966	"Brez besed"	Berta Ambrož	Elza Budau	7th
1970	"Pridi, dala ti bom cvet"	Eva Sršen	Dušan Velkaverh	11th

Sepe conducted both his compositions in the Eurovision Song Contest. Additionally, he was the conductor for the Slovenian entries in 1997 and 1998. He was also the Slovenian jury member in the 1993 Eurovision pre-selection.

== Personal life and death ==
Since 1956, Sepe was married to Majda Sepe, a famous Slovenian singer, for whom he also wrote music. Film director Polona Sepe was born to them in 1957.

Sepe died on 24 December 2020, at the age of 90.
