= Noel Andrews =

Irish radio host (1932–2011)

- Born: 7 January 1932; Dublin, Ireland
- Died: 8 January 2011 (aged 79); Dublin, Ireland
- Occupations: Television and radio commentator
- Spouses: Joan Andrews (m. 1960; died 1981) Agnes Stack (m. 1985)
- Children: 6
- Relatives: Eamonn Andrews (brother)

Noel Andrews (7 January 1932 – 8 January 2011) was an Irish radio and television commentator and disc jockey for RTÉ. His career spanned over four decades, in which he was best known as the regular RTÉ presenter for 14 editions of the Olympics between 1972 and 1996. He was the younger brother of television presenter Eamonn Andrews.

== Early life and career ==
Andrews was born in Dublin, Ireland. He had been passionate about boxing since his early youth, and in 1950 at the age of 18 he was hired by RTÉ as a sports reporter, where he covered boxing matches. At the time he was the youngest reporter ever given a permanent job by a broadcasting service. After several years working as a reporter, Andrews subsequently became a radio disc jockey on Radio Éireann.

== Career ==
=== Olympic Broadcasting ===
Whilst working on Radio 1, he became a household name he later became hosts of the Showband Circuit, where he introduced many of Ireland's big music names including Butch Moore, Dana and Muriel Day. However he still was keen to commentate on Boxing matches, which he maintained in the sixties and seventies.

In 1972, Andrews began his long serving association with the Olympic Games. He made his debut at the 1972 Summer Olympics, he served as the main presenter with fellow sports presenter Brendan O'Reilly. During the 1972 Olympics both Andrews and O'Reilly spent several hours broadcasting to Ireland over the Munich massacre. Andrews also gained publicity commentating on Barry McGuigan's world title victory over Eusebio Pedroza in 1985 and Michael Carruth's gold medal win at the Barcelona Olympics in 1992.

After O'Reilly retired in 1994, Andrews continued to present the Olympic 8 coverage, the last time he presented the Summer Olympics for RTÉ was at the 1996 Summer Olympics in Atlanta. A year later he retired from broadcasting.

=== Other work ===
Outside sports broadcasting, Andrews was heavily involved in initiating the Melody Fair and was a member of the Avoca Singers, he also was the television commentator for RTÉ in the 1971 Eurovision Song Contest.

== Personal life and death ==
In 1960, Andrews married Joan, with whom he had six children. In 1970 he bought The Avoca Inn, a hotel in Avoca, County Wicklow. Joan died in 1981, and in 1985 he married Agnes (née Stack), manager of the nearby Arklow Bay Hotel. The two later sold The Avoca Inn in 1990 and moved to Annagassan, County Louth. After a long illness, Andrews died on 8 January 2011, the day after his 79th birthday.

Preceded by Valerie McGovern	Eurovision Song Contest Ireland Commentator; 1971	Succeeded by Mike Murphy
