= Dominique Dussault =

French singer

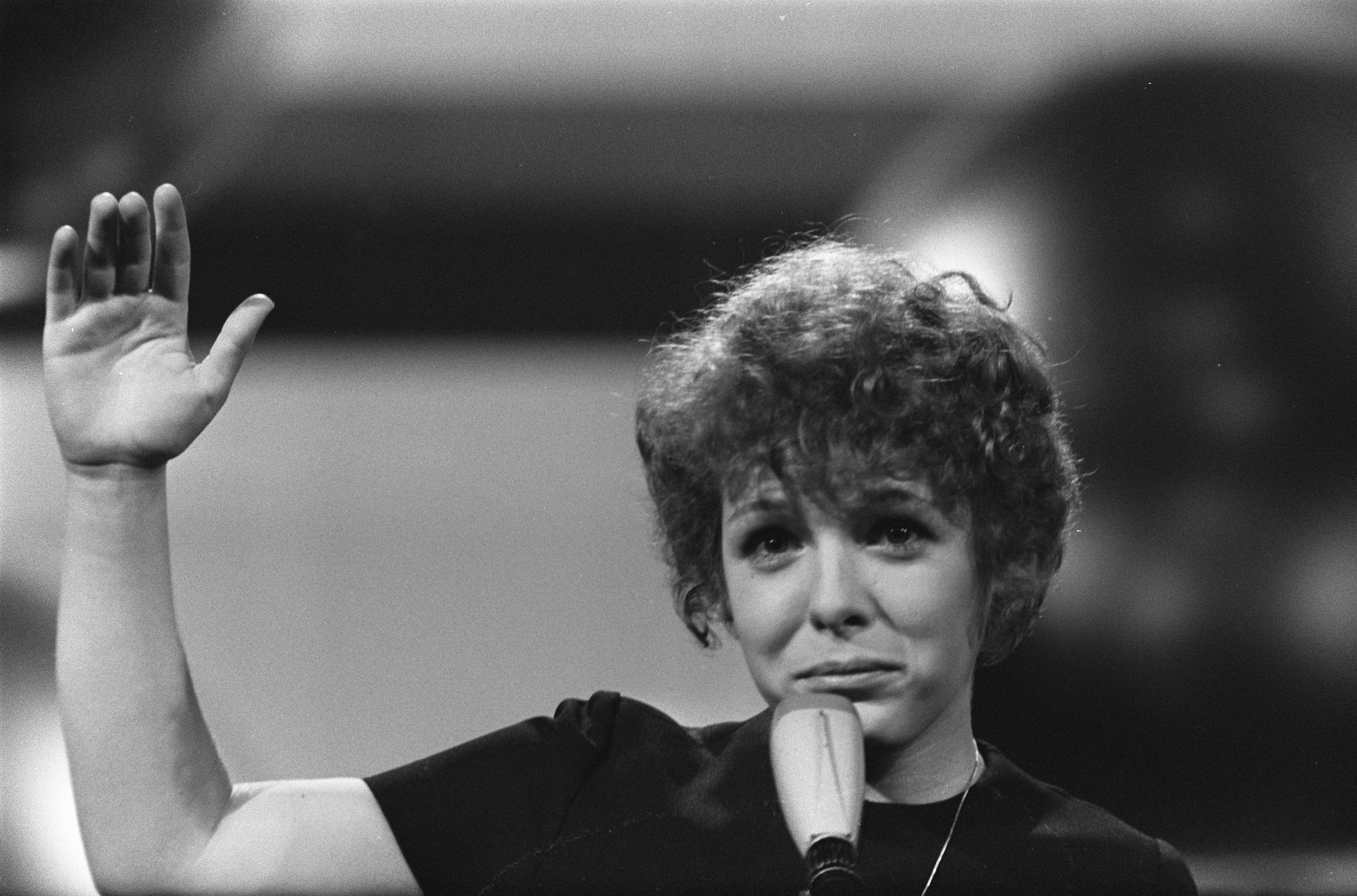
- Dominique Dussault at the Eurovision Song Contest 1970

Background information
- Born: 1954 (age 70–71)
- Origin: Paris, France
- Genres: Pop
- Years active: 1969 – present

Dominique Dussault is a French singer.

She represented Monaco in the Eurovision Song Contest 1970 with the song Marlène. With 5 points, she came in 8th position.

== Discography ==
=== Albums ===
- Ave Maria (1969)
- Marlène (1970)
- Mains dans les poches (1982)

=== Singles ===
- "Églantine"
- "Le monsieur"
- "La nuit"

Preceded by Jean Jeacques	Monaco in the Eurovision Song Contest; 1970	Succeeded by Séverine
