= United Kingdom in the Eurovision Song Contest 1970 =

- Eurovision Song Contest 1970
- Participating broadcaster: British Broadcasting Corporation (BBC)
- Country: United Kingdom
- Selection process: Artist: Internal selection Song: A Song for Europe 1970
- Selection date: 7 March 1970

Competing entry
- Song: "Knock, Knock Who's There?"
- Artist: Mary Hopkin
- Songwriters: John Carter; Geoff Stephens

Placement
- Final result: 2nd, 26 points

Participation chronology

The United Kingdom was represented at the Eurovision Song Contest 1970 with the song "Knock, Knock Who's There?", written by John Carter and Geoff Stephens, and performed by Mary Hopkin. The British participating broadcaster, the British Broadcasting Corporation (BBC), selected its entry through a national final, after having previously selected the performer internally.

== Before Eurovision ==
=== A Song for Europe 1970 ===
The British Broadcasting Corporation (BBC) held the national final on 7 March 1970, presented by Cliff Richard, as part of the BBC1 series It's Cliff Richard!. Hopkin performed one of the six shortlisted songs each week, before performing all six in succession in the final. These performances were then immediately repeated. The votes were open to the public by post, with the results announced on 14 March, just a week before the Eurovision final itself. The BBC had chosen Welsh singer Mary Hopkin as its representative back in August 1969, having made her name with songs such as "Those Were the Days" and "Goodbye". At the final, Hopkin was backed by singers John Evans and Brian Bennett, with the orchestra conducted alternately by John Cameron and Johnny Arthey, who directed the orchestra in Amsterdam. Hopkin was allowed to select one song for the contest, this being "You've Everything You Need", while the other five were selected from over 200 songs put forward by songwriters. "You've Everything You Need" caused a minor scandal on the day of the British final when the Daily Mirror reported that the publishers of that song had told all their staff to send in multiple votes. Whether votes had to be then adjusted by the BBC to avoid a scandal is unknown, but the song ended up being placed second-last. "Knock, Knock Who's There?" ultimately became the easy victor with 120,290 votes. The song was written by Geoff Stephens and John Carter. The votes presented below were only announced rounded up.

A Song for Europe 1970 – 7 March 1970
| R/O | Song | Songwriter(s) | Votes | Place |
|---|---|---|---|---|
| 1 | "Three Ships" | Doug Flett; Guy Fletcher | 60,330 | 3 |
| 2 | "Early in the Morning of Your Life" | Alan Hawkshaw; Ray Cameron | 15,090 | 6 |
| 3 | "I'm Gonna Fall in Love Again" | Cyril Ornadel; Hal Shaper | 74,670 | 2 |
| 4 | "You've Everything You Need" | Roger Reynolds; Anthony Dyball | 39,360 | 5 |
| 5 | "Can I Believe" | Valerie Avon; Harold Spiro | 42,160 | 4 |
| 6 | "Knock, Knock Who's There?" | Geoff Stephens; John Carter | 120,290 | 1 |

=== Chart success ===
Hopkin recorded all six entries, with the top two placed being released as a single. Of the others, only a bootleg version of "You've Everything You Need" was ever available commercially. "Knock, Knock Who's There?" was released as a single and became a hit across Europe, peaking at No.2 in the UK, with the runner up "I'm Gonna Fall in Love Again" on the B-Side. Belatedly, it also became a minor US hit for her in 1972.

== At Eurovision ==
At the Eurovision final, BBC 1 broadcast the Contest with David Gell providing the television commentary, Tony Brandon provided the radio commentary on BBC Radio 1. The contest was also broadcast on British Forces Radio with commentary provided by John Russell.

=== Voting ===
Every participating broadcaster assembled a jury of ten people. Every jury member could give one point to his or her favourite song.

Points awarded to the United Kingdom
| Score | Country |
|---|---|
| 4 points | Germany; Monaco; Yugoslavia |
| 3 points | Ireland; Netherlands |
| 2 points | France; Italy; Luxembourg; Switzerland |

Points awarded by the United Kingdom
| Score | Country |
|---|---|
| 4 points | Ireland; Yugoslavia |
| 1 point | Netherlands; Switzerland |
