= Willy Dobbe =

Dutch television presenter

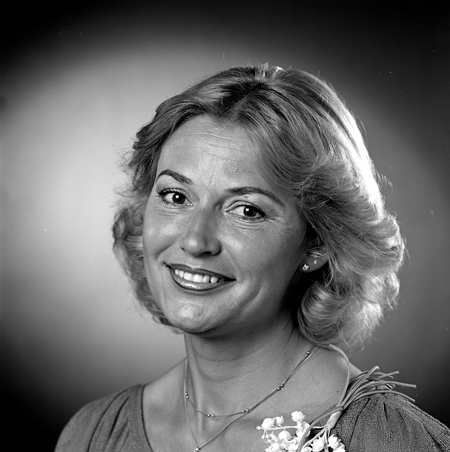
- Willy Dobbe in 1981
- Born: 2 January 1944 (age 81); The Hague, Netherlands
- Occupation(s): Television announcer and presenter
- Employer: TROS

Willy Dobbe (born 2 January 1944) is a Dutch television announcer and former television presenter. She was the host of the 1970 Eurovision Song Contest and also presented the Dutch national finals for the 1971 and 1972 contests.

== Career ==
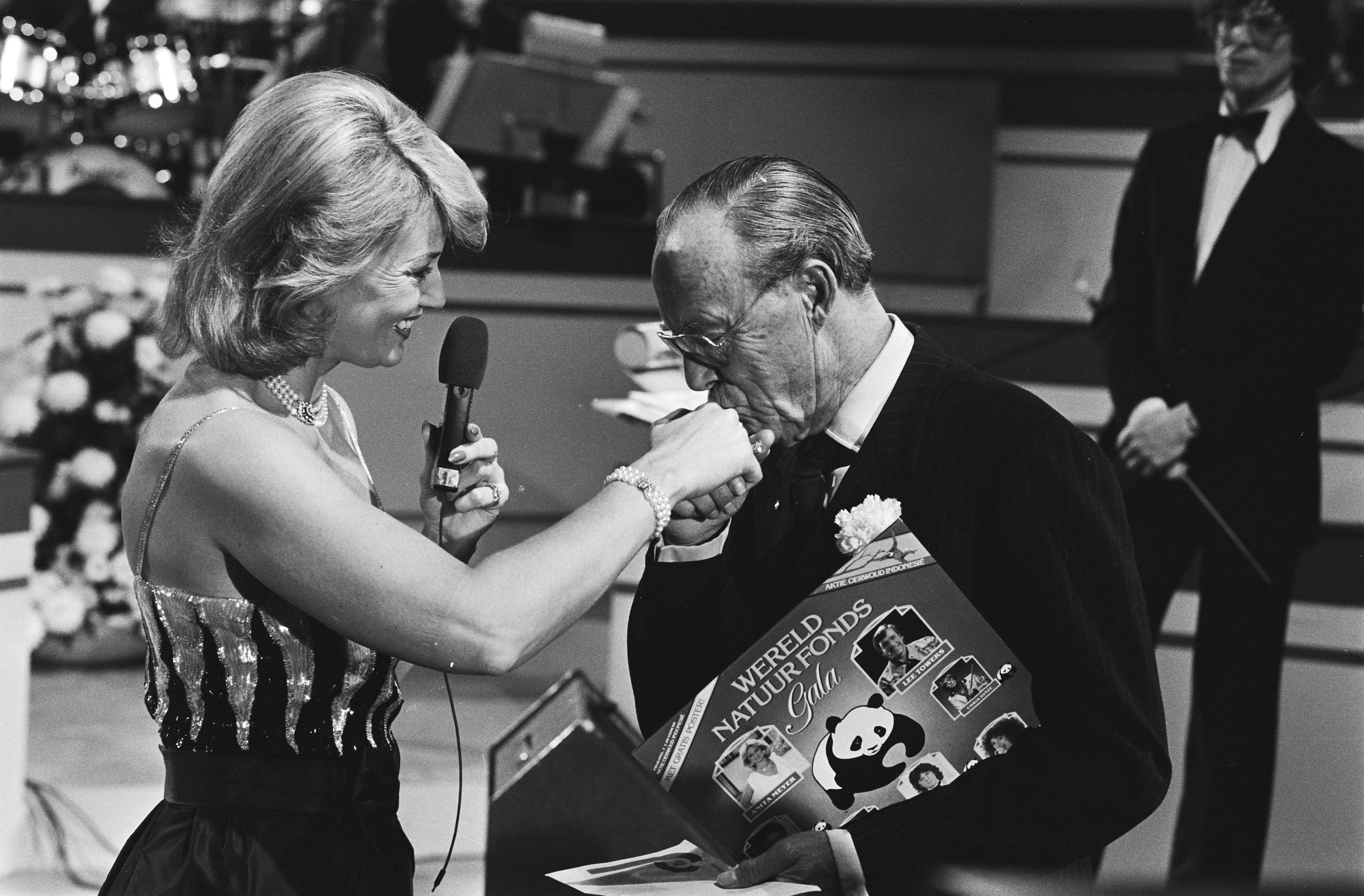
Dobbe with Prince Bernhard at a fundraiser presented by her for the World Wildlife Fund

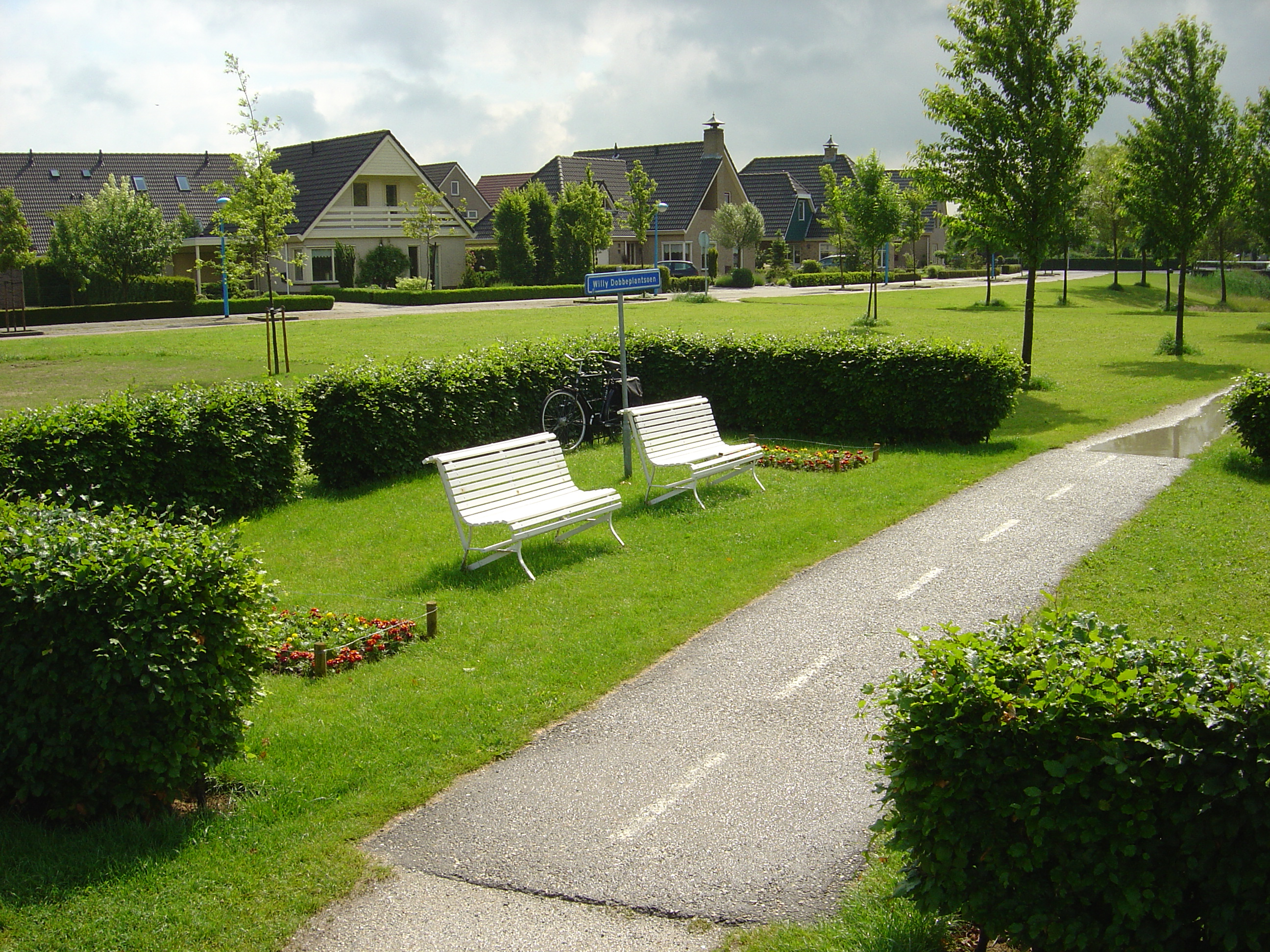
Willy Dobbeplantsoen, Olst

Dobbe was born in The Hague and obtained a degree as beautician. In 1967 she joined the broadcaster Nederlandse Omroep Stichting and became a television announcer, which she remained for 5 years before moving to the TROS in 1972.

In 1970, Dobbe was asked to host the Eurovision Song Contest in Amsterdam. She maintained her Eurovision connection for two more years, when she hosted the Nationaal Songfestival consecutively in 1971 and 1972. Dobbe also presented programmes such as School TV, WK Allround Dancing, and, most notably, Zevensprong. She remained associated with TV for the next two decades and retired in 1989, to make way for Linda de Mol.

Twice during her career, Dobbe was featured in the Dutch gossip magazine Story. Dutch director Wim T. Schippers created a fictional "Willy Dobbe plantsoen" (Willy Dobbe park) that figured in several of his satirical programs. In 1997, a real park was named after her in Olst, with Dobbe and Schippers both being present at its opening.

Heerlen has been her domicile for most of her life.

== See also ==
- List of Eurovision Song Contest presenters

Preceded by (Spain) Laurita Valenzuela	Eurovision Song Contest presenter 1970	Succeeded by (Republic of Ireland) Bernadette Ní Ghallchóir
