= Bojan Adamič =

Slovene composer

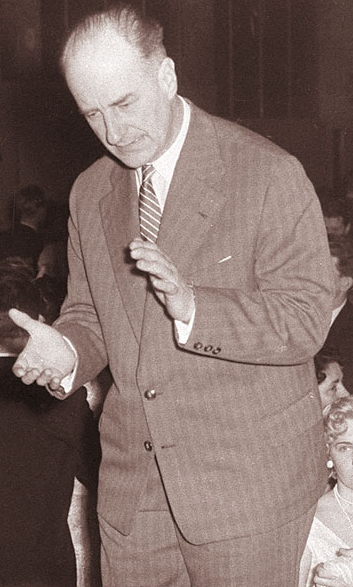
Bojan Adamič in 1960

Bojan Adamič a.k.a. Master (Slovene: Mojster; 9 August 1912 – 3 November 1995), Slovene Partisans nom de guerre Gregor, was a well-known Slovene composer of jazz, the Slovenian song festival music, and particularly film scores. He was also an avid photographer, interested particularly in carnival figures from Ptuj.

== Life ==
Adamič was born in Ribnica in the Duchy of Carniola, Austria-Hungary. He finished the Poljane Grammar School in 1931, and earned a degree in piano from the Ljubljana Music Academy in June 1941.

During World War II, he financially supported the anti-fascist Slovenian resistance movement. In 1943, he joined Slovene Partisans, where he was also injured in an attack by Germans and was relocated to the headquarters, providing music that was then emitted by the Liberation Front Radio. During the war he met his future wife, Barbara Černič. They had one daughter, Alenka Adamič.

== Work ==
Adamič was the first conductor of the RTV Slovenia Big Band assembling some of its members already in Slovene Partisans that made first public appearance in June 1945 as part of the reopening of the Postojna Cave. Although he had an early preference for jazz, he later concentrated on film scores, the Slovenian song festival music, and music he wrote for theater stages. In the music he composed, Slovene folk elements are identifiable. He composed scores for over 200 films that included films produced in Slovenia, USA, Hungary, Switzerland, West Germany, France, and Great Britain.

Adamič served as the president of the Society of Slovene Composers. From 1980 until 1982, he was the head of the music production of Radio Slovenia. He died in 1995 in Ljubljana.

== Awards ==
Adamič received the most prestigious awards for his work. In 1979, he was bestowed the Prešeren Award, the most highly prized cultural award in Slovenia, for his lifetime work. In 1990, he received the Ježek Award for his humorous songs and as a collaborator of Frane Milčinski, and in 1992, the Silver Order of Freedom of the Republic of Slovenia.
