= Dušan Velkaverh =

- Also known as: Peter Arnold
- Born: 12 September 1943; Georgetown, British Guiana (now Guyana)
- Died: 1 February 2016 (aged 72) Ljubljana, Slovenia
- Genres: Pop
- Occupation: Lyricist
- Years active: 1968–2011

Dušan Velkaverh (12 September 1943 – 1 February 2016) was a Slovenian lyricist.

== Early life ==
Dušan Velkaverh was born on 12 September 1943 in Georgetown, British Guiana (now Guyana) to a Slovene sailor and an English nurse. In 1942, during World War II, his father joined the crew of an Allied ship, torpedoed off the coast of South America. He met his wife, a daughter of a colonial clerk, in the hospital where he was recovering. Velkaverh was born a year later.

Soon after his birth, the family moved to New York City, where they stayed for a short period of time. Shortly after that, the family moved to London. In 1948, they moved to Yugoslavia. At first, they lived in Belgrade, where his father got a job as deputy minister of shipping, then they relocated to Rijeka. In 1956, the family came to Slovenia, first to Portorož and then to Ljubljana, where Velkaverh lived for the rest of his life. Velkaverh's mother and father spoke English. He learned Slovene at the age of 13. Previously he only spoke English and Serbo-Croatian. In 2007, he visited his birth house in Georgetown for the first time after sixty-four years. He was married three times and has three children. During the last years of his life, he was living in Vrhnika.

== Work ==
He is considered a legend of the Slovenian song festival history since about thirty of his 600 lyrics became major hits in Slovenia. In 2011 a concert was held in Križanke Summer Theatre, Ljubljana, with him as an honorary guest, where his greatest hits were interpreted by the Slovenian National TV's Symphony Orchestra and RTV Slovenia Big Band with many singers who sung them originally, as well as younger ones. He was awarded a Slovenian National TV award for his work at the same event.

He was a longtime chief of music production at RTV Slovenia for the RTV Slovenia Big Band and RTV Slovenia Symphony Orchestra. He wrote lyrics for "Dan ljubezni", a Yugoslavian song performed at the Eurovision Song Contest 1975 by Slovenian vocal band "Pepel in kri". In the early 1990s, he was the executive director of Slovenian music label Corona.

=== Lyrics ===
Song	Year	Artist(s)
"Danes mi je 16 let"		Lidija Kodrič
"Ljubi, ljubi, ljubi«	1969	Eva Sršen
"Mini Maxi«	1970	Bele vrane
"Pridi dala ti bom cvet«	1970	Eva Sršen
"Silvestrski poljub«	1971	Alfi Nipič
"Mlade oči«	1972	Ditka Haberl
"Ptica vrh Triglava«	1972	Braco Koren
"Ljubljančanke«	1972	Janko Ropret
"Gvendolina«	1972	Srce
"Med iskrenimi ljudmi«	1972	Majda Sepe
"Maja z biseri«	1974	Janez Bončina
"Dan ljubezni«	1975	Pepel in kri
"Ti si rekla sonce«	1976	Ivo Mojzer ft Strune
"Bisere imaš v očeh«	1978	Oto Pestner ft Franjo Bobinac
"Brez ljubezni mi živeti ni«	1978	Moni Kovačič
"Dan neskončnih sanj«	1980	Vlado Kreslin
"Marie, ne piši pesmi več«	1981	Hazard
"Vsak je sam«	1981	Hazard
"Otroci pankrtov«	1981	Hazard
"Najlepše pesmi«	1983	Hazard
"Nad mestom se dani«	1985	Ditka Haberl
"Zelene livade s teboj«	1985	12. nadstropje
"Moja dežela«	1986	Oto Pestner ft. Strune
"Sabina«	1986	Bazar
"Pustite nam ta svet"	1987	Vlado Kreslin
"Insieme: Evropa'92«	1990	Pepel in kri
"Svobodno sonce«	1992	Slovenski Band Aid
"Nekdo igra klavir«	1993	Čudežna polja
"Who's the real Kekec«	1999	Ali En
"Moja dežela '11«	2011	Katrinas, Derenda, Naber, Godec...
