= RTV Slovenia Big Band =

- Origin: Slovenia
- Genres: Jazz, big band
- Years active: 1945–present
- Website: bigband.rtvslo.si

The Slovenian Radio and Television Big Band (Slovene: Big Band RTV Slovenija) is a big band that appears on Slovenian National TV. It was established right after World War II by Slovene conductor and composer Bojan Adamič (1912–1995), assembling some of its members already in Slovene Partisans that made first public appearance in June 1945 as part of the reopening of Postojna Cave. Although orchestral jazz remained its major dedication, the band played also a number of film scores composed by Adamič for Slovenian films.

Nowadays most of its members have studied at various jazz academies abroad and the orchestra itself has hosted some of the biggest jazz conductors and soloists during its history.

== History ==
=== Radio Ljubljana Dance Orchestra ===
Officially taken under the auspices of Radio Ljubljana in the fall of 1945, it was renamed the Radio Ljubljana Dance Orchestra until the early 1960s. The most prominent Slovenian jazz soloists included Ati Soss, Dušan Veble, Mojmir Sepe, Zoran Komac, Albert Podgornik, and Franci Puhar.

Since 1961, led by Jože Privšek (1937–1998), the orchestra dominated the scene within ex-Yugoslavia with Slovenian jazz music. It also won the German Deutsche Phono Akademie award for the best record in 1978, competing with orchestras led by James Last and Max Greger.

=== Radio and Television Big Band and afterwards ===
It was renamed the Ljubljana Radio and Television Big Band with the TV being introduced. In 1993, they accompanied the entries at Kvalifikacija za Millstreet, a preselection show for countries in Central and Eastern Europe looking to debut at the 1993 Eurovision Song Contest. The musical director was Petar Ugrin.

After the country's independence Ljubljana in its name was replaced by Slovenia. In 1992, the orchestra was taken over by Lojze Krajnčan. Since 2002, the artistic director and manager is Hugo Sekoranja and the soloists include Tadej Tomšič, Primož Grašič, Tomaž Gajšt, Dominik Krajnčan, David Jarh, Blaž Jurjevčič, Primož Fleischman, Matjaž Mikuletič, and Ratko Divjak.

In the 2011/12 season the Big Band performed regularly in Jazz Club Mons. In a cycle of six concerts the orchestra cooperated with the well-known Slovene artists Nuška Drašček, Uroš Perić, Lucienne, Tomaž Grintal, Janez Bončina Benč, Neža Drobnič, Neisha, and others.
