= Jože Privšek =

Slovene jazz and pop musician

Background information
- Also known as: Jeff Conway, Simon Gale
- Born: Jože Privšek; 19 March 1937; Ljubljana, Drava Banovina, Kingdom of Yugoslavia
- Died: 11 June 1998 (aged 61) Ljubljana, Slovenia
- Genres: classical music, pop music, jazz music, film music
- Occupations: composer, conductor, arranger
- Instruments: piano, vibraphone

Jože Privšek (19 March 1937 – 11 June 1998), who also used the pseudonyms Jeff Conway and Simon Gale, was one of the most acclaimed Slovene jazz and pop musicians. He was a pianist, vibraphonist, composer, and conductor.

== Life ==
Privšek was born in Ljubljana. He studied music at the Ljubljana Intermediate Music School until 1955 and then for three years in the same city with the composer Lucijan Marija Škerjanc. He continued his studies at the Berklee College of Music in Boston in the United States with the professor Herb Pomeroy. He started his career as a pianist and a vibraphonist. In 1961, he took the post of the leader of the RTV Slovenia Big Band, which brought him the widest recognition, and retained it until 1995, and as the composer of numerous music works and arrangements of popular and jazz music. Privšek died in Ljubljana at the age of 61 years.

== Work ==
Some of Privšek's pop songs – among these are “Ljubezen v f molu”,"Nad mestom se dani" (Dawn Above the City), "Vozi me vlak v daljave" (Train Drives Me Far Away), "Silvestrski poljub" (New Year's Eve Kiss), "Mati, bodiva prijatelja" (Mother, Let's Be Friends) – have become golden oldies in Slovenia. Among his best jazz works are "Porednež" (The Naughty Man), "Ognjemet" (Firework), "Zeleni pekel" (Green Hell), "Privid" (Mirage), "We Need Time", "Rožnik" (June), "That's for Ending" and others. In the UK, his music was frequently used for BBC test card transmissions in between regular broadcasting. "Flying over San Jose", performed by the Simon Gale Orchestra, is a well-known example. The Simon Gale Orchestra released the CD Classical Beatles in 1994. there were multiple LP released as Jeff Conway and his Orchestra between 1974 and 1989, including Jeff Conway's Big Band Cocktail (1987). Privšek's classical works include a Piano Concerto, the Ballet in Colours and the May Suite for brass band.
