= Majda Sepe =

Slovenian singer (1937–2006)

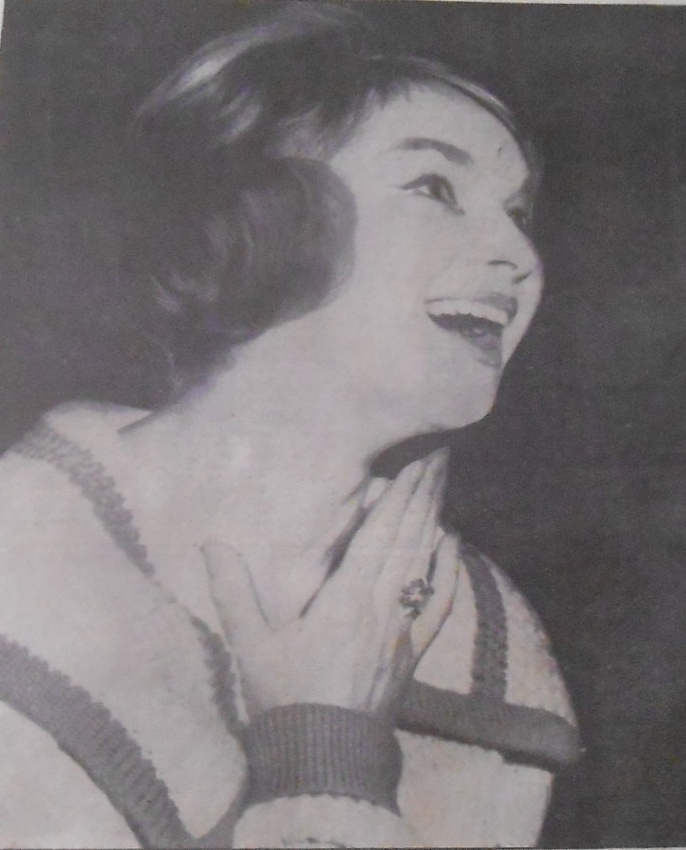
Majda Sepe, 1959

Majda Sepe (née Bernard; 2 July 1937 – 11 April 2006) was one of the most successful and well recognized Slovenian singers in the time of Yugoslavia and was one of the most renowned singers of the Golden Age of Slovenian folk music.

== Biography ==
=== Early life ===
Majda Bernard was born on 2 July 1937 in Ljubljana. Her mother had fled the Primorska region because of Italian Fascism, and her father was from Škofja Loka, a town near Ljubljana. They lived together in Ljubljana where he worked as an ambulance driver and she was a clerk. Their first child was a boy they named Marjan, who wanted a baby sister.

The family lived in Ljubljana Castle, which had been converted into public housing. As a teenager, Majda practiced ballet and expressive dance, having lessons with Meta Vidmar, because she wanted to be a singer and an actress among other things. She attended primary and secondary school for music. During her education in Jože Plečnik high school she attended singing lessons with Franc Schiffrer who was a well-known opera singer and the father of Mojmir Sepe. Because she was interested in many activities she applied as a model in 1953 while still a high school student, and was also accepted. This was the beginning of her modelling career that lasted till the end of the 1950s. On one of her fashion shows she also met Mojmir Sepe who he was a musician in the accompanying band there. The two got married in 1956. The highlight of her very successful career was her appearance in a knitwear fashion show in Moscow, Leningrad, and Riga in 1959.

Elda Viler described Majda as such: "I am a greatly impressed by her appearance; wonderful hair a golden colour, nice figure. She was a true Nordic type of woman, very attractive."

=== Career ===
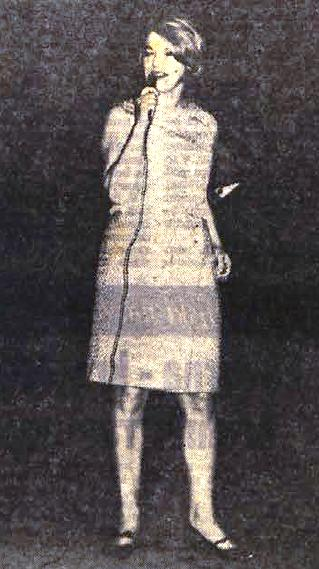
Majda Sepe, 1967

Her music career began early. She had studied singing in Music School in Ljubljana. At age 19 she made a music performance in Paris, France, with Ljubljana Jazz Musicians. For years later, in 1960, she joined the Jazz Festival in Bled. Jazz and Chanson became her favourite sorts of music. Majda Sepe's name is very strongly connected with Slovenian most recognized and famous music festival – Slovenska popevka. She first took part in 1962 when it was just starting up and continued to appear every year until 1977, only missing out in 1968.

Majda performed some of the greatest hits of the Festival and soon, she became a well known and popular Slovenian performer. She worked together with her husband Mojmir Sepe. Some of her best-known songs are: Med iskrenimi ljudmi, Ribič ribič me je ujel, Kje je tista trava, Šuštarski most (cover of Waterloo Road), Prelepa si bela Ljubljana, Bele ladje, etc. These number one music hits are today considered evergreens.

=== Death and afterward ===
On 10 September 2006 a concert was performed in Ljubljana in loving memory of Majda Sepe and her work. Slovenian singers such as Elda Viler, Alenka Godec, Nuša Derenda, Darja Švajger, Vita Mavrič, Irena Vrčkovnik, Oto Pestner, Lado Leskovar, and Anžej Dežan performed her songs with Orchestra Simfonika and Big Band RTV Slovenija.

== Gallery ==
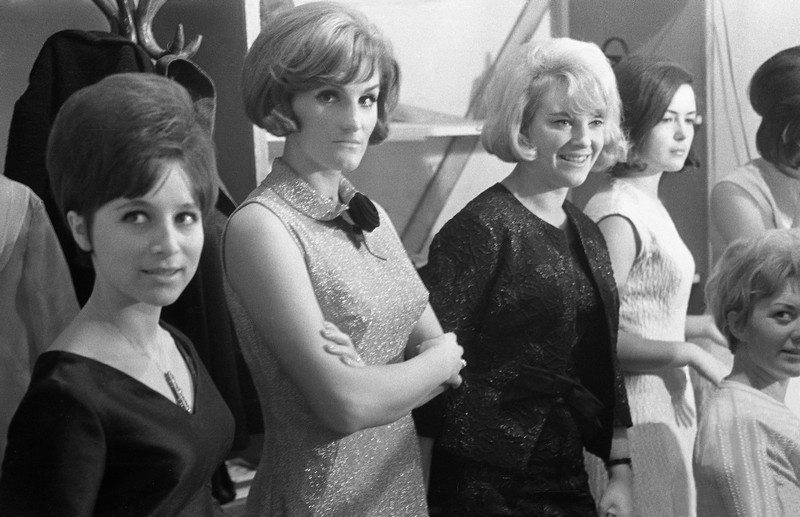
Berta Ambrož, Elda Viler and Majda Sepe at the Opatija '65 festival

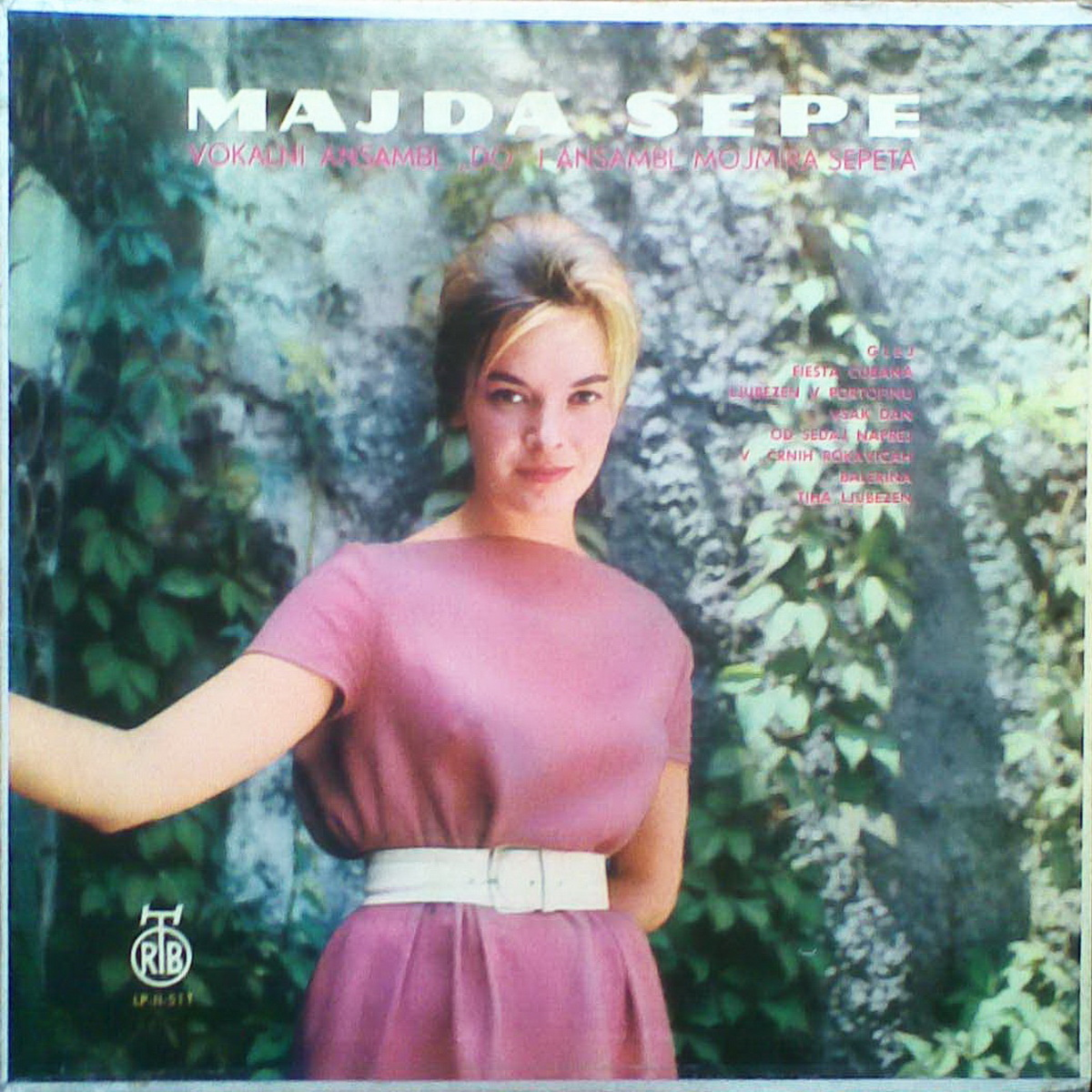
Single Glej pevke (1961)

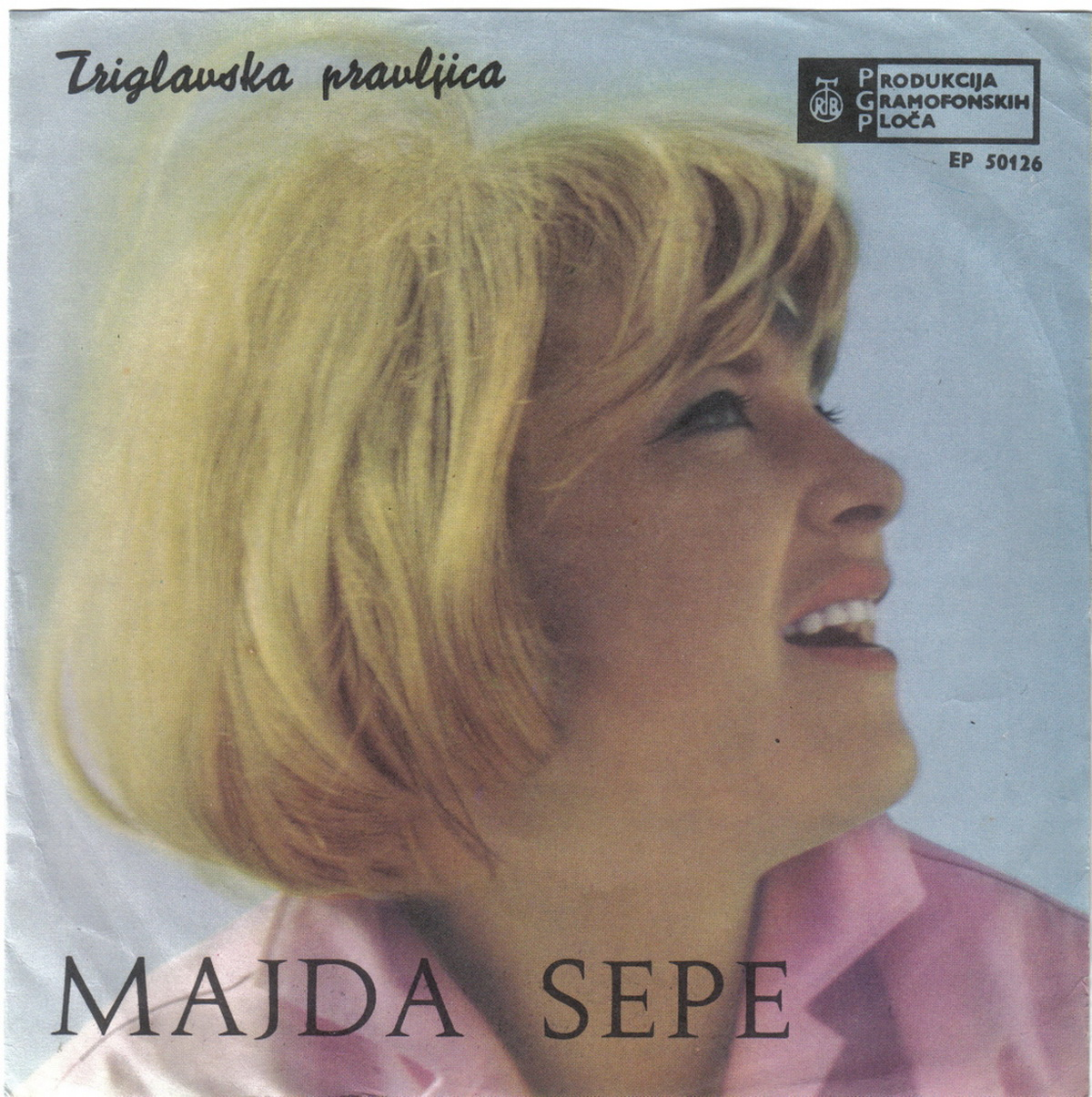
Single Triglavska Pravljica (1966)

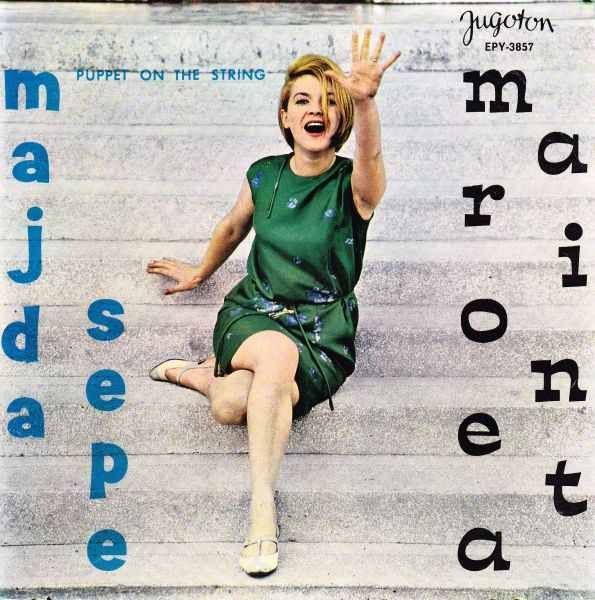
Single Marioneta (1967)
