= Gianfranco Baldazzi =

Italian lyricist, record producer, author and journalist (1943–2013)

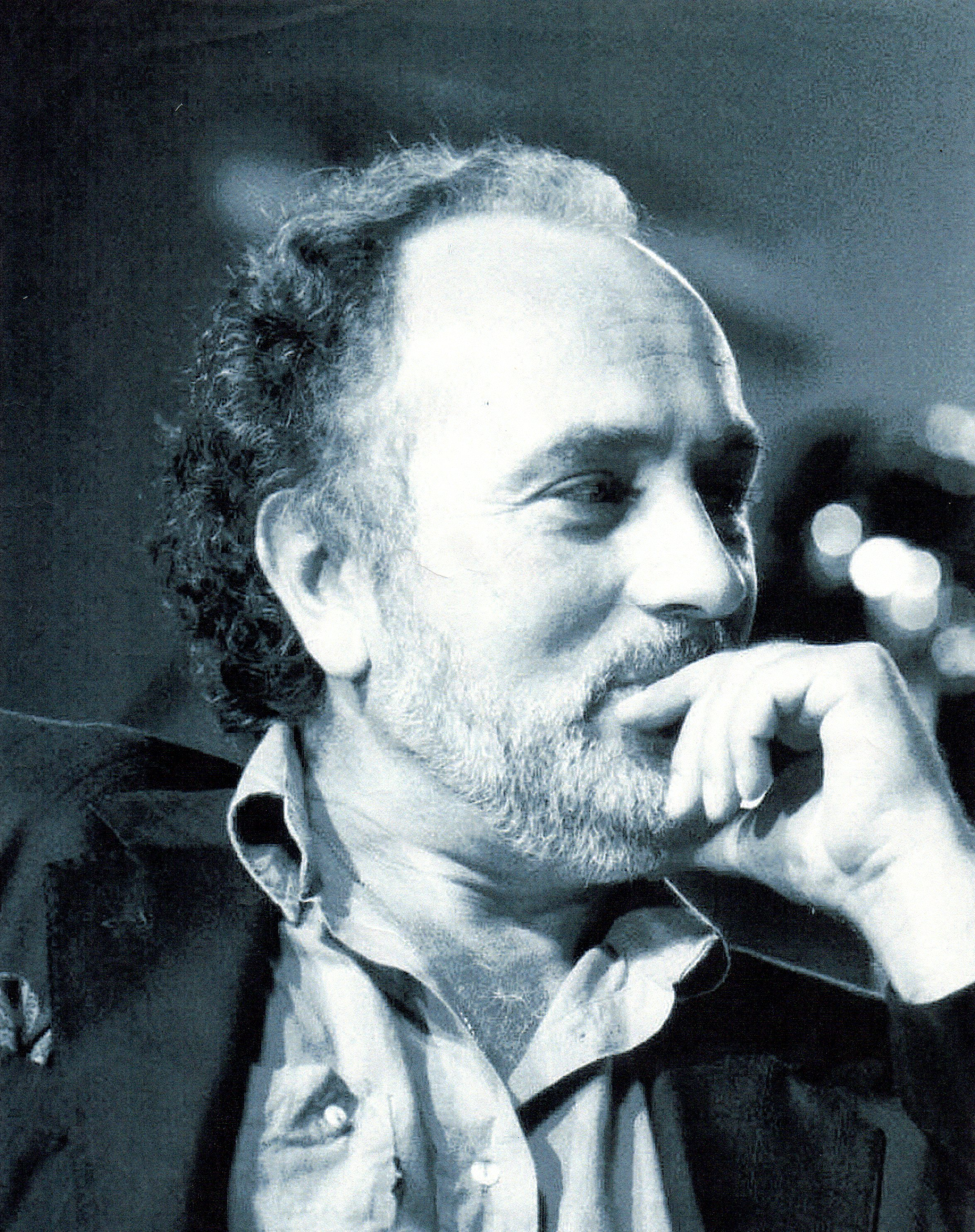
- Born: 28 July 1943; Bologna
- Died: 25 June 2013 (aged 69); Rome
- Occupation(s): lyricist and record producer

Gianfranco Baldazzi (28 July 1943 – 25 June 2013) was an Italian lyricist, record producer, author and journalist.

== Life and career ==
Born in Bologna, Baldazzi started his career as a stage actor. Active from the second half of the 1960s, he wrote songs for Mina, Lucio Dalla, Gianni Morandi, Ornella Vanoni, Peppino di Capri, Ron among others. He was also a producer, and between 1991 and 1994 he was artistic director of the label Pressing. As an author, Baldazzi wrote several books about Italian music history, some biographies and a historical novel set in the Middle Ages, "Il Silenzio della Cattedrale" (The Silence of the Cathedral). He also collaborated with several magazines and newspapers, and with the TV-channel RAI International.

== Publications ==
- La canzone italiana del Novecento (Newton Compton, 1988), a history of Italian Song from Enrico Caruso to Eros Ramazzotti
- I nostri cantautori (Thema, prima edizione 1990), a history of Art Song in Italy from Odoardo Spadaro to the present day
- Dalla (Muzio, prima edizione 1990), a biography of singer-songwriter Lucio Dalla, told by a friend from his same hometown
- Le parole che cantavamo (50&PIÙ, Le Perle della Memoria, 2004)
- Lucio Dalla. L'uomo degli specchi (Minerva Edizioni, 2013) with photos by Roberto Serra

== Songs written by Gianfranco Baldazzi ==
Year	Title	Lyrics Authors	Music Authors	Singers
1970	Sylvie	Gianfranco Baldazzi e Sergio Bardotti	Lucio Dalla	Lucio Dalla
1970	Dolce Susanna	Gianfranco Baldazzi e Sergio Bardotti	Lucio Dalla	Rosalino
1970	Fumetto	Gianfranco Baldazzi e Sergio Bardotti	Lucio Dalla	Lucio Dalla
1970	Occhi di ragazza	Gianfranco Baldazzi e Sergio Bardotti	Lucio Dalla	Gianni Morandi
1970	Dimmi cosa aspetti ancora	Gianfranco Baldazzi e Sergio Bardotti	Daniela Casa	Dominga
1971	Itaca	Gianfranco Baldazzi e Sergio Bardotti	Lucio Dalla	Lucio Dalla
1971	Il colonnello	Gianfranco Baldazzi e Sergio Bardotti	Lucio Dalla	Lucio Dalla
1971	La casa in riva al mare	Gianfranco Baldazzi e Sergio Bardotti	Lucio Dalla	Lucio Dalla
1971	Strade su strade	Gianfranco Baldazzi e Sergio Bardotti	Lally Stott	Lucio Dalla
1971	Per due innamorati	Gianfranco Baldazzi e Sergio Bardotti	Lucio Dalla	Lucio Dalla
1971	L'ultima vanità	Gianfranco Baldazzi e Sergio Bardotti	Lucio Dalla	Lucio Dalla
1972	Se mi davi retta	Gianfranco Baldazzi	Memmo Foresi e Luigi Lopez	Fiorella Mannoia
1972	Se mi davi retta	Gianfranco Baldazzi e Tony Cucchiara	Marcello Valci	Giuliana Valci
1972	Piazza Grande	Gianfranco Baldazzi e Sergio Bardotti	Rosalino Cellamare e Lucio Dalla	Lucio Dalla
1972	Quando verranno i giorni	Gianfranco Baldazzi e Sergio Bardotti	Piero Piccioni	Mireille Mathieu
1972	Nata libera	Gianfranco Baldazzi e Sergio Bardotti	Piero Piccioni	Mireille Mathieu
1972	Principessa	Gianfranco Baldazzi e Sergio Bardotti	Rosalino Cellamare	Gianni Morandi
1973	Da sabato a lunedì	Gianfranco Baldazzi	Rosalino Cellamare e Lucio Dalla	Rosalino Cellamare
1973	Non svegliarti	Gianfranco Baldazzi	Rosalino Cellamare	Rosalino Cellamare
1973	Leggende d'Oltrepò	Gianfranco Baldazzi	Rosalino Cellamare	Rosalino Cellamare
1973	Radar	Gianfranco Baldazzi	Rosalino Cellamare	Rosalino Cellamare
1973	Senza sogni, senza amici, senza casa	Gianfranco Baldazzi	Rosalino Cellamare	Rosalino Cellamare
1973	Rosa d'amore	Gianfranco Baldazzi	Rosalino Cellamare	Rosalino Cellamare
1973	I bimbi neri non san di liquirizia	Gianfranco Baldazzi	Rosalino Cellamare	Rosalino Cellamare
1973	Era la terra mia	Gianfranco Baldazzi	Rosalino Cellamare	Rosalino Cellamare
1973	Il mio papà ed io	Gianfranco Baldazzi	Rosalino Cellamare	Rosalino Cellamare
1973	Disegno libero	Gianfranco Baldazzi	Rosalino Cellamare	Rosalino Cellamare
1973	Il carrarmato disarmato	Gianfranco Baldazzi	Rosalino Cellamare	Rosalino Cellamare
1973	La grande città industriale	Gianfranco Baldazzi	Rosalino Cellamare	Rosalino Cellamare
1973	Quelli delle medie	Gianfranco Baldazzi	Rosalino Cellamare	Rosalino Cellamare
1973	Alla fine della scuola	Gianfranco Baldazzi	Rosalino Cellamare	Rosalino Cellamare
1973	Da grande farò il maestro	Gianfranco Baldazzi	Rosalino Cellamare	Rosalino Cellamare
1973	La scuola che vorrei	Gianfranco Baldazzi	Rosalino Cellamare	Rosalino Cellamare
1975	Esperienze	Gianfranco Baldazzi	Rosalino Cellamare	Rosalino Cellamare
1975	Tuo fratello (che fa i computer)	Gianfranco Baldazzi	Rosalino Cellamare	Rosalino Cellamare
1975	Colori, forme, voci e odori	Gianfranco Baldazzi	Rosalino Cellamare	Rosalino Cellamare
1975	La mia scimmia	Gianfranco Baldazzi	Rosalino Cellamare	Rosalino Cellamare
1975	Non ti lascio andare via	Gianfranco Baldazzi	Rosalino Cellamare	Rosalino Cellamare
1975	Fenomeni naturali	Gianfranco Baldazzi	Rosalino Cellamare	Rosalino Cellamare
1975	Il ponte	Gianfranco Baldazzi	Rosalino Cellamare	Rosalino Cellamare
1975	Né lui, né te, né l'odio, né l'amore	Gianfranco Baldazzi e Nicoletta Bauce	Nicoletta Bauce	Nicoletta Bauce
1977	Ancora i nostri errori	Gianfranco Baldazzi	Lino Rufo	Lino Rufo
1978	Laura G.	Gianfranco Baldazzi	Lino Rufo	Lino Rufo
1978	Battello senza marinai	Gianfranco Baldazzi	Lino Rufo	Lino Rufo
1978	Fuori dal corpo	Gianfranco Baldazzi	Lino Rufo	Lino Rufo
1978	Alla Rai...	Gianfranco Baldazzi	Lino Rufo	Lino Rufo
1978	La perdita di un paradiso	Gianfranco Baldazzi	Lino Rufo	Lino Rufo
1978	Amore in manicomio	Gianfranco Baldazzi	Tony Occhiello	Lino Rufo
1979	Fuoco	Gianfranco Baldazzi	Lino Rufo/Vincenzo Pagliarini	Lino Rufo
1980	Ehi ci stai	Gianfranco Baldazzi e Goran Kuzminac	Goran Kuzminac	Goran Kuzminac
1981	Grande figlio di puttana	Gianfranco Baldazzi e Lucio Dalla	Gaetano Curreri e Giovanni Pezzoli	Stadio
1981	Chi te l'ha detto	Gianfranco Baldazzi e Lucio Dalla	Gaetano Curreri	Stadio
1982	Cantare	Gianfranco Baldazzi	Edoardo Vianello	Edoardo Vianello
