= Valerie McGovern =

Irish radio and television broadcaster

Valerie McGovern (born c.1938) was an Irish radio and television broadcaster. She worked as a continuity announcer, and read the news on RTÉ Television starting in 1977. McGovern presented the programme Summer Lookaround with Bunny Carr on RTÉ TV. The weekly magazine programme, Summer Scene was presented by McGovern, along with Joe Mac Anthony. She was the television commentator of the 1970 Eurovision Song Contest, which Ireland won, for RTÉ.

Preceded by Gay Byrne	Eurovision Song Contest Ireland Commentator; 1970	Succeeded by Noel Andrews
