= Henri Dès =

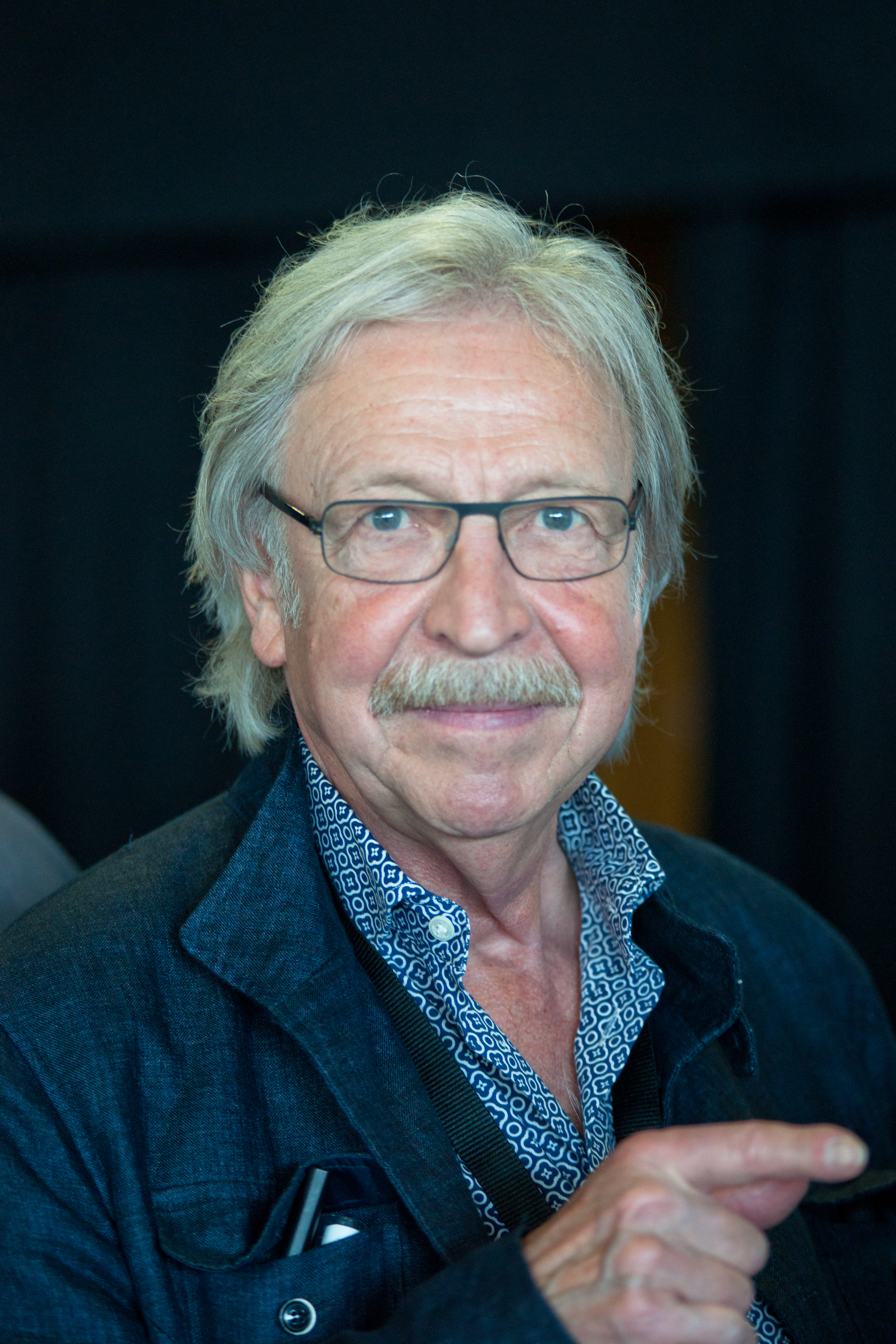
- Henri Dès

Background information
- Born: Henri Destraz; 14 December 1940 (age 85); Renens, Vaud, Switzerland
- Label: Mary Josée Productions
- Website: www.henrides.net

Henri Dès (born Henri Destraz 14 December 1940) is a Swiss French-language children's singer and songwriter immensely popular in European Francophone countries. In 1970, he released his first album, Retour. Dès also founded his own record label, Disques Mary-Josée, which he named after his wife.

In 1969, he won the Sopot International Song Festival.

He represented Switzerland in the Eurovision Song Contest 1970 with the song "Retour". It was placed fourth. Henri achieved another fourth place, this time in the Swiss national final for Eurovision 1976, with the song "C'est pour la vie".

On 15 March 2019 he joined striking school children in Lausanne protesting against climate change.

== Discography ==
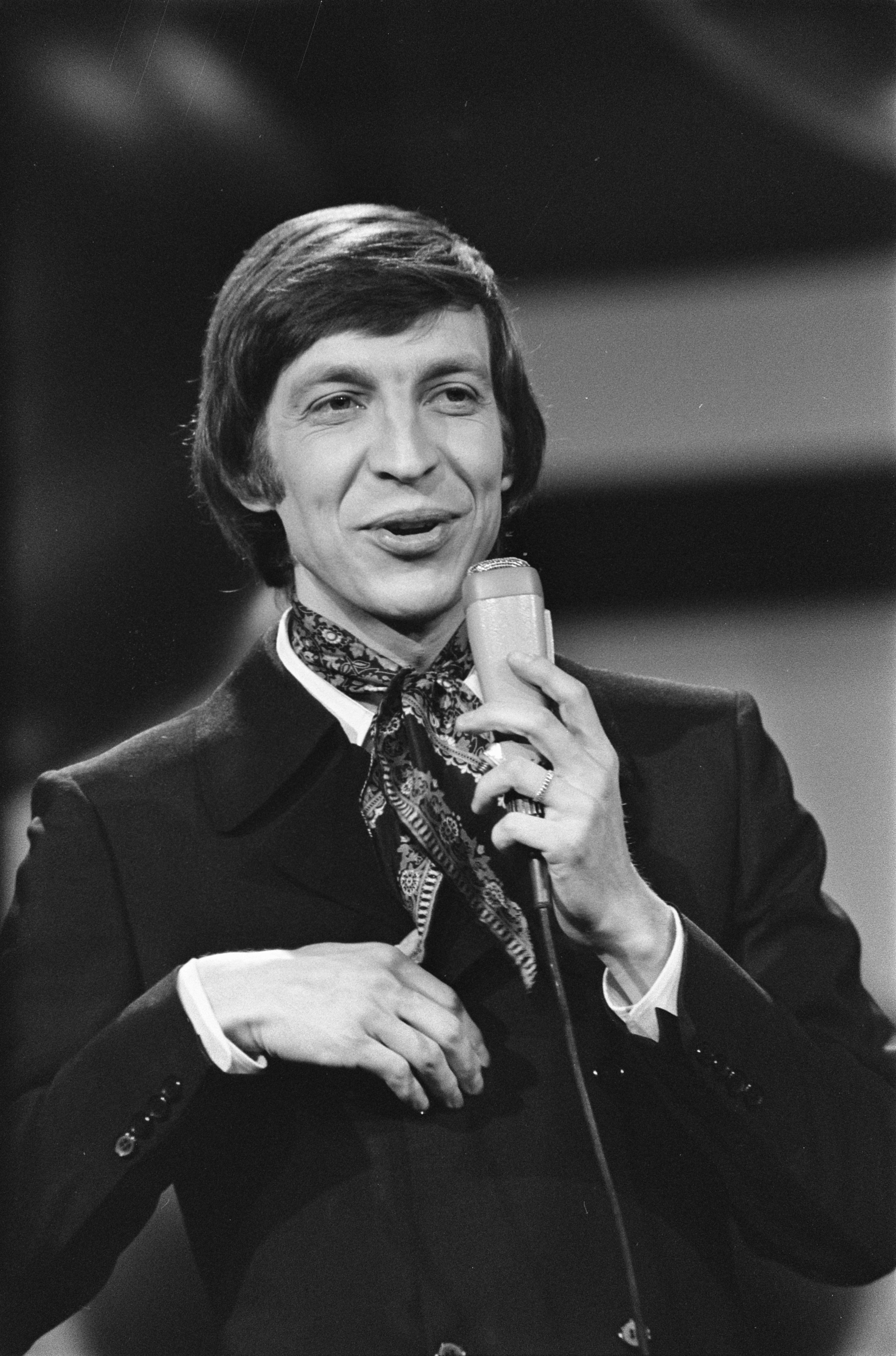
Henri Dès at the Eurovision Song Contest 1970.

Year	Album name	Label
1970	Retour	Disques Evasion
1974	Quand on revient d'ailleurs	Mary-Josée Music
1977	Cache-cache	Mary-Josée/CBS Records
1978	Si c'était moi?	Disques Mary-Josée
1979	La Petite Charlotte	Mary-Josée/CBS Records
1980	Flagada	Mary-Josée/Interdisc
1982	L'âne blanc	Mary-Josée/Interdisc
1984	Dessin fou	Mary-Josée/CBS Records
1985	Les Trésors de Notre Enfance Vol. 1	Mary-Josée/CBS Records
1986	Le Beau Tambour	Mary-Josée/Interdisc
1988	La Glace au citron	Mary-Josée/Interdisc
1989	Olympia 1989	Mary-Josée/Interdisc
1991	Les Bêtises	Mary-Josée/Interdisc
1993	Le crocodile	Mary-Josée/Interdisc
1994	Olympia 94	Mary-Josée/Sony Music
1995	Far West	Mary-Josée/Sony Music
1996	Olympia 1996	Mary-Josée/Sony Music
1997	On ne peut (pas) tout dire	Mary-Josée/Sony Music
1998	Olympia 98	
1999	Du soleil	Mary-Josée/D.E.P.
2000	Olympia 2000	
2001	C'est le père Noël	Mary-Josée/D.E.P.
2002	Comme des géants	Mary-Josée/D.E.P.
2003	Olympia 2003	
2005	Polissongs	Mary-Josée/D.E.P.
2006	Olympia 2006	
2007	Gâteau	Mary-Josée/Interdisc
2008	L'Hirondelle et le Papillon	Mary-Josée/Interdisc
2009	Olympia 2009	
2011	Tout Simplement	Mary-Josée/Interdisc
2012	Abracadabra	Mary-Josée/Interdisc
2012	En 25 chansons	Mary-Josée/Interdisc
2014	50 ans de chansons	Mary-Josée/Interdisc

Awards and achievements
Preceded by Paola Del Medico with "Bonjour, bonjour"	Switzerland in the Eurovision Song Contest; 1970	Succeeded by Peter, Sue and Marc with "Les Illusions de nos vingt ans"
