= Sandi Čolnik =

Slovene journalist

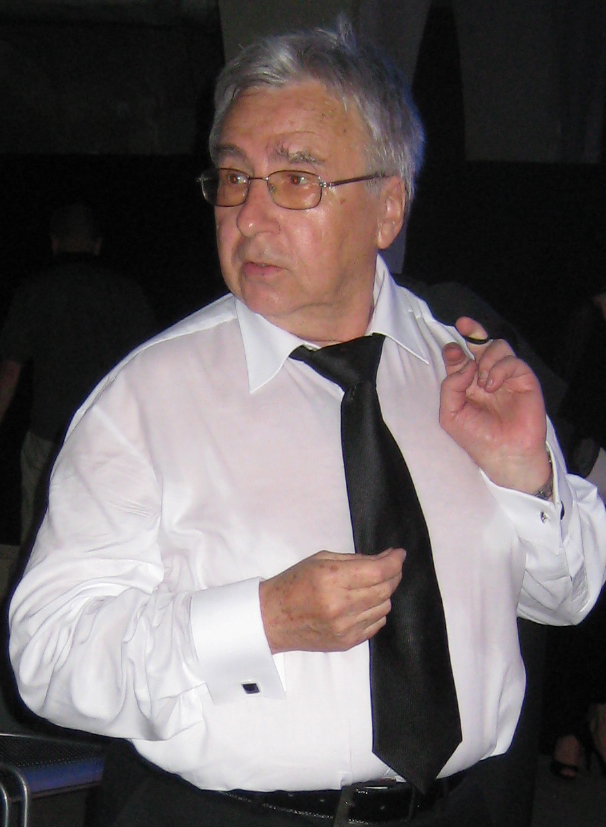
- Born: Alexander Ludovik Čolnik; February 5, 1937; Maribor, Kingdom of Yugoslavia
- Died: February 28, 2017 (aged 80); Ljubljana, Slovenia
- Occupations: Journalist, TV presentator, writer

Alexander Ludovik Čolnik (5 February 1937 – 28 February 2017), more commonly known as Sandi Čolnik, was a Slovene journalist, TV presenter, writer and newspaper editor.

Čolnik began his career as a radio host at Radio Maribor. He then decided to go Ljubljana to study law but eventually changed his mind and studied journalism after working as a replacement at RTV Slovenia.

He devoted much of his career to cultural journalism and was appreciated for the interviews he conducted. He had already been known in the sixties for the program TV pošta, and in the seventies for his work on Monitor, a program that aired throughout Yugoslavia. He also worked as a host for music festivals and galas. He retired in 2000.

He received the Jurčič Award in 1997. The prize recognizes excellence in journalism as well as the freedom of journalism and writing in Slovenia.

Čolnik was a long-standing member of Rotary Club Ljubljana.

He was married to Dr. Monika Brumen and had two daughters.

Čolnik died in 2017 at the age of 80.

The Slovenian public remembers him for his velvet voice, kind and elegant demeanour, respectful attitude and talent in journalism.
