= Eva Sršen =

Slovenian singer (born 1951)

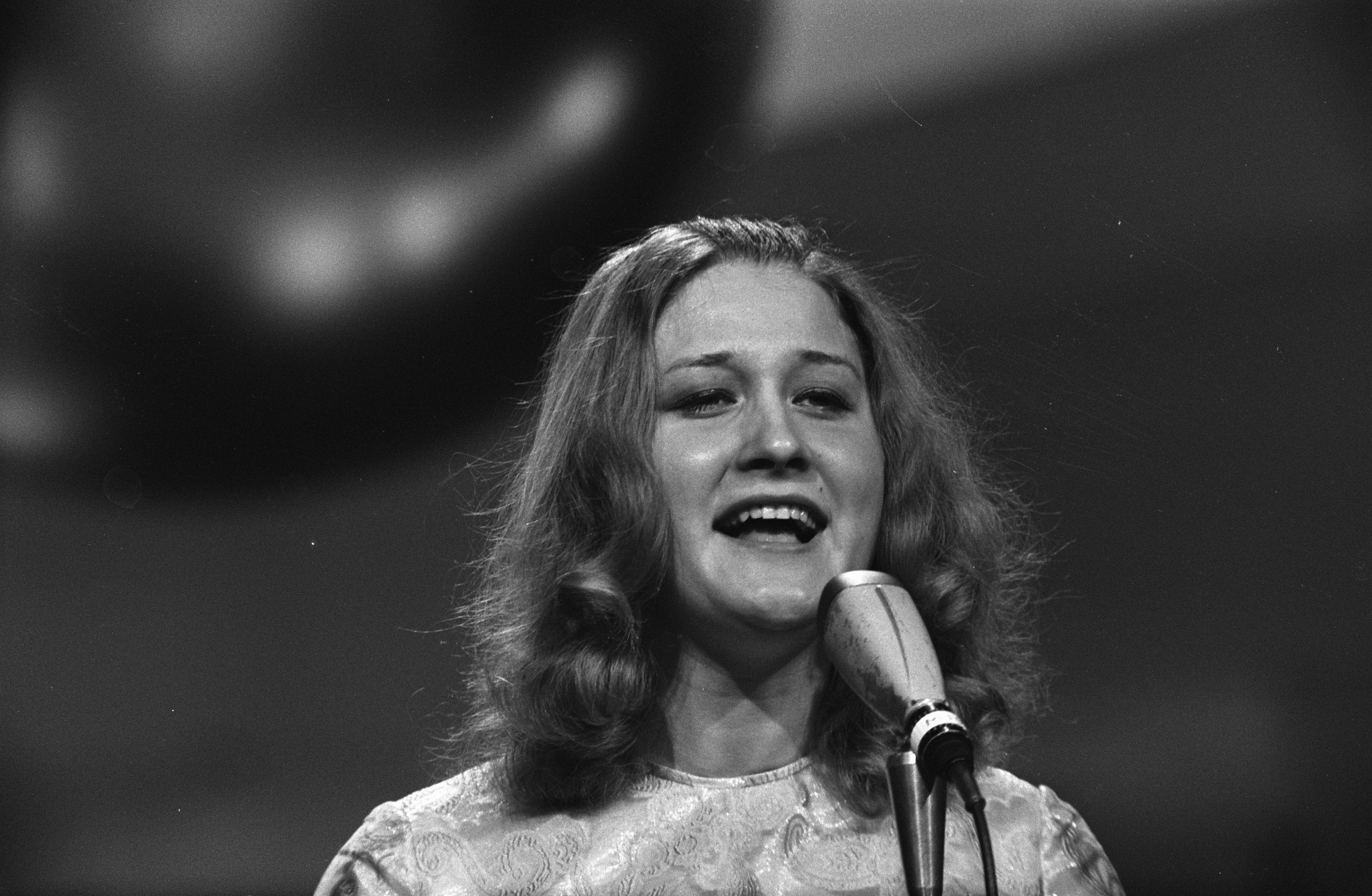
Eva Sršen during rehearsals for the Eurovision Song Contest 1970

Eva Sršen (born 1951 in Ljubljana) is a Slovenian singer who had a short career in Yugoslav pop music in the first half of the 1970s.

She first became well known by winning the national selection for the Eurovision Song Contest 1970. That year, she performed the song "Pridi, dala ti bom cvet" ("Come, I'll Give You a Flower") at the Eurovision Song Contest 1970 in Amsterdam, taking 11th place. The single version sold well in Yugoslavia, as did her follow-up song, "Ljubi ljubi, ljubi" ("My dear loves, loves").

In 1974, she competed in the Yugoslavian selection again, this time singing the song "Lepa ljubezen," placing ninth out of twelve entries. Since the mid-1970s, Sršen has mainly left the music industry although she still sings in Slovenia from time to time.

Preceded by Ivan & 3M	Yugoslavia in the Eurovision Song Contest; 1970	Succeeded by Krunoslav Slabinac
