= Spain in the Eurovision Song Contest 1970 =

- Eurovision Song Contest 1970
- Participating broadcaster: Televisión Española (TVE)
- Country: Spain
- Selection process: 2º Festival de la Canción Española
- Selection date: 14 February 1970

Competing entry
- Song: "Gwendolyne"
- Artist: Julio Iglesias
- Songwriter: Julio Iglesias

Placement
- Final result: 4th, 8 votes

Participation chronology

Spain was represented at the Eurovision Song Contest 1970 with the song "Gwendolyne", written and performed by Julio Iglesias. The Spanish participating broadcaster, Televisión Española (TVE), selected its entry through a national final. The song, performed in position 9, placed fourth –tying with the songs from France and Switzerland– out of twelve competing entries with 8 votes.

== Before Eurovision ==
=== 2º Festival de la Canción Española ===
To select its entry, Televisión Española (TVE) organised together with Radio Nacional de España (RNE) the 2º Festival de la Canción Española at the Palau Nacional in Barcelona on 12–14 February 1970, hosted by Laura Valenzuela and Joaquín Prat. It was the second and final edition of the Festival. Twenty songs competed over three shows, with the winner song being decided upon through regional jury voting.

==== Competing entries ====
Twenty compositions were selected to compete in the national final by the broadcaster, with two designated acts per song. As regulations only allowed a maximum of three performers and three backing vocalists, groups were able to compete by designating one or two vocalists, with the rest of the group featuring as backing vocalists. Some performers that had been initially selected withdrew or were replaced before the live shows.

Artist 1 (Credited singer)	Artist 2 (Credited singer)	Song	Songwriter(s)
Johnny Valentino	Ángela Escribano	"Balada de invierno"	María José de Ceratto
Los Dos	Los 80 Centavos (Asunción)	"Balada del maderero"	Rafael García Loza; Julio Mengod
Elena	Ernesto	"Bienvenido"	Vicente Roca; Joan Solé Tutusaus
Karlo y las Hermanas Ros	Los Musicales (Beatriz y Ester)	"Carrusel"	Joan Serracant; Vicente Sabater
Jaime Morey	Maya (Note: Replacement for Henry Stephen, who was originally selected.)	"De pronto, tú"	Aurora Sánchez-Sousa; José Luis Pécker
Los Mismos (Helena Bianco)	Gaby Berger	"Don Juan"	Lucia Graves; Ramón Farrán
Franciska	Nino Bravo	"Esa será mi casa"	Enrique Carnicer; Carmen Fons; Álvaro Sebastián
Rafaleón	Los Valldemosa (Margaluz y Rafael)	"Fiesta"	Lucía Graves; Ramón Farrán
Julio Iglesias (Note: Trío La La La provided the backing vocals and were credited by the hosts.)	Rosy Armen (Note: Replacement for Andee Silver, who was originally selected.)	"Gwendolyne"	Julio Iglesias
Karolyne	Albert Band (Albert)	"Hoy quiero cantar"	Joan Solé Tutusaus; Vicente Roca
Manolo, de Los Catiros (Note: Replacement for Victoriano Ortiz, who was originally selected.)	Rosalía	"Igual que yo"	Luisa Margarita Girón
Basilio	Voces Amigas (Javier de Miguel)	"Jamás la olvidaré"	Pablo Herrero; Carlos Fernández-Prida
Los Gritos (Manolo Galván)	Cristina	"Me gusta, me gusta"	Ramón Simó; José Solá
Julio Ramos	Tuset 31 (Jordi y José María)	"Novia para Miguel"	Juan Carlos Calderón
Luisita Tenor (Note: Replacement for J. Thomas, who was originally selected.)	Rosa Mary y Javier	"Sí, después"	Javier Vidal
Donna Hightower (Note: Replacement for Tony Ronald, who was originally selected.)	Julián Granados	"Soy feliz"	Alfonso Sainz
Errol y Los Tops	Altamira 3	"Tal vez mañana"	Carlos Bermúdez
Luciana Wolf	Vicente Pizarro	"Un manantial de barro"	José Ángel Cardona; Miguel Ángel Tapia
Voces Amigas (Tony)	Mocedades (Sergio y Estíbaliz)	"Un mundo mejor"	José Luis Armenteros; Pablo Herrero
Mocedades (Rafael Blanco)	Tuset 31 (Javier)	"Viejo marino"	Pedro Iturralde; Alberto Bourbon

==== Semi-finals ====
The semi-finals took place on 12 and 13 February 1970. On both shows, ten songs were first performed by one of its assigned singers, and then again by the other singer. After the second semi-final, ten songs qualified for the final through jury voting from 15 regional RNE, TVE, and Radio Peninsular studios, each distributing five votes among their favourite songs. The number of votes received by each song was announced, but were not reflected in the official television excerpts from semi-final 2, or in contemporary reports.

Semi-final 1 – 12 February 1970
R/O	Artist		Song	Result
R/O	First act	Second act	Song	Result
1	Elena	Ernesto	"Bienvenido"	—N/a
2	Karlo y las Hermanas Ros	Los Musicales	"Carrusel"	—N/a
3	Jaime Morey	Maya	"De pronto, tú"	Qualified
4	Franciska	Nino Bravo	"Esa será mi casa"	—N/a
5	Rafaleón	Los Valldemosa	"Fiesta"	Qualified
6	Rosalía	Manolo, de Los Catiros	"Igual que yo"	Qualified
7	Luisita Tenor	Rosa Mary y Javier	"Sí, después"	Qualified
8	Los Dos	Los 80 Centavos	"Balada del maderero"	Qualified
9	Voces Amigas	Mocedades	"Un mundo mejor"	Qualified
10	Basilio	Voces Amigas	"Jamás la olvidaré"	Qualified

Semi-final 2 – 13 February 1970
R/O	Artist		Song	Result
R/O	First act	Second act	Song	Result
1	Julio Iglesias	Rosy Armen	"Gwendolyne"	Qualified
2	Cristina	Los Gritos	"Me gusta, me gusta"	Qualified
3	Mocedades	Tuset 31	"Viejo marino"	—N/a
4	Luciana Wolf	Vicente Pizarro	"Un manantial de barro"	—N/a
5	Julio Ramos	Tuset 31	"Novia para Miguel"	—N/a
6	Donna Hightower	Julián Granados	"Soy feliz"	Qualified
7	Johnny Valentino	Ángela Escribano	"Balada de invierno"	—N/a
8	Los Mismos	Gaby Berger	"Don Juan"	—N/a
9	Karolyne	Albert Band	"Hoy quiero cantar"	—N/a
10	Errol y Los Tops	Altamira 3	"Tal vez mañana"	—N/a

==== Final ====
The final took place on 14 February 1970. As in the semi-finals, each song was performed twice by its different performers. In the event that the winner song had two Spanish singers, the juries would vote again to decide which artist would perform the song at the Eurovision Song Contest; if the song was shared with a foreign artist, the Spanish singer would become the Eurovision representative. 15 regional juries, each distributing five votes among their favourite songs, selected "Gwendolyne" as the winning song. As Rosy Armen was a French singer, Julio Iglesias was automatically chosen as the Spanish artist for Eurovision.

Final – 14 February 1970
R/O	Artist		Song	Points	Place
R/O	First act	Second act	Song	Points	Place
1	Manolo, de Los Catiros	Rosalía	"Igual que yo"	0	8
2	Los Dos	Los 80 Centavos	"Balada del maderero"	6	4
3	Jaime Morey	Maya	"De pronto, tú"	5	5
4	Rafaleón	Los Valldemosa	"Fiesta"	7	3
5	Basilio	Voces Amigas	"Jamás la olvidaré"	13	2
6	Voces Amigas	Mocedades	"Un mundo mejor"	4	6
7	Luisita Tenor	Rosa Mary y Javier	"Sí, después"	0	8
8	Julio Iglesias	Rosy Armen	"Gwendolyne"	37	1
9	Los Gritos	Cristina	"Me gusta, me gusta"	0	8
10	Donna Hightower	Julián Granados	"Soy feliz"	3	7

Final – Detailed Regional Jury Results
R/O	Song	Las Palmas (TVE)	Cuenca (Radio Peninsular)	Tenerife (RNE)	La Coruña (RNE)	Barcelona (RNE)	Málaga (Radio Peninsular)	Oviedo (RNE)	Murcia (RNE)	Sevilla (RNE)	San Sebastián (RNE)	Zaragoza (RNE)	Barcelona (TVE)	Madrid (RNE)	Valencia (Radio Peninsular)	Madrid (TVE)	Total
1	"Igual que yo"																0
2	"Balada del maderero"	1	1		1			1	1						1		6
3	"De pronto, tú"					1			1		1	1				1	5
4	"Fiesta"		1							3			3				7
5	"Jamás la olvidaré"			5	1	1		2		2				2			13
6	"Un mundo mejor"								1		3						4
7	"Sí, después"																0
8	"Gwendolyne"	4	3		1	3	5	2	2		1	4	1	3	4	4	37
9	"Me gusta, me gusta"																0
10	"Soy feliz"				2								1				3

== At Eurovision ==
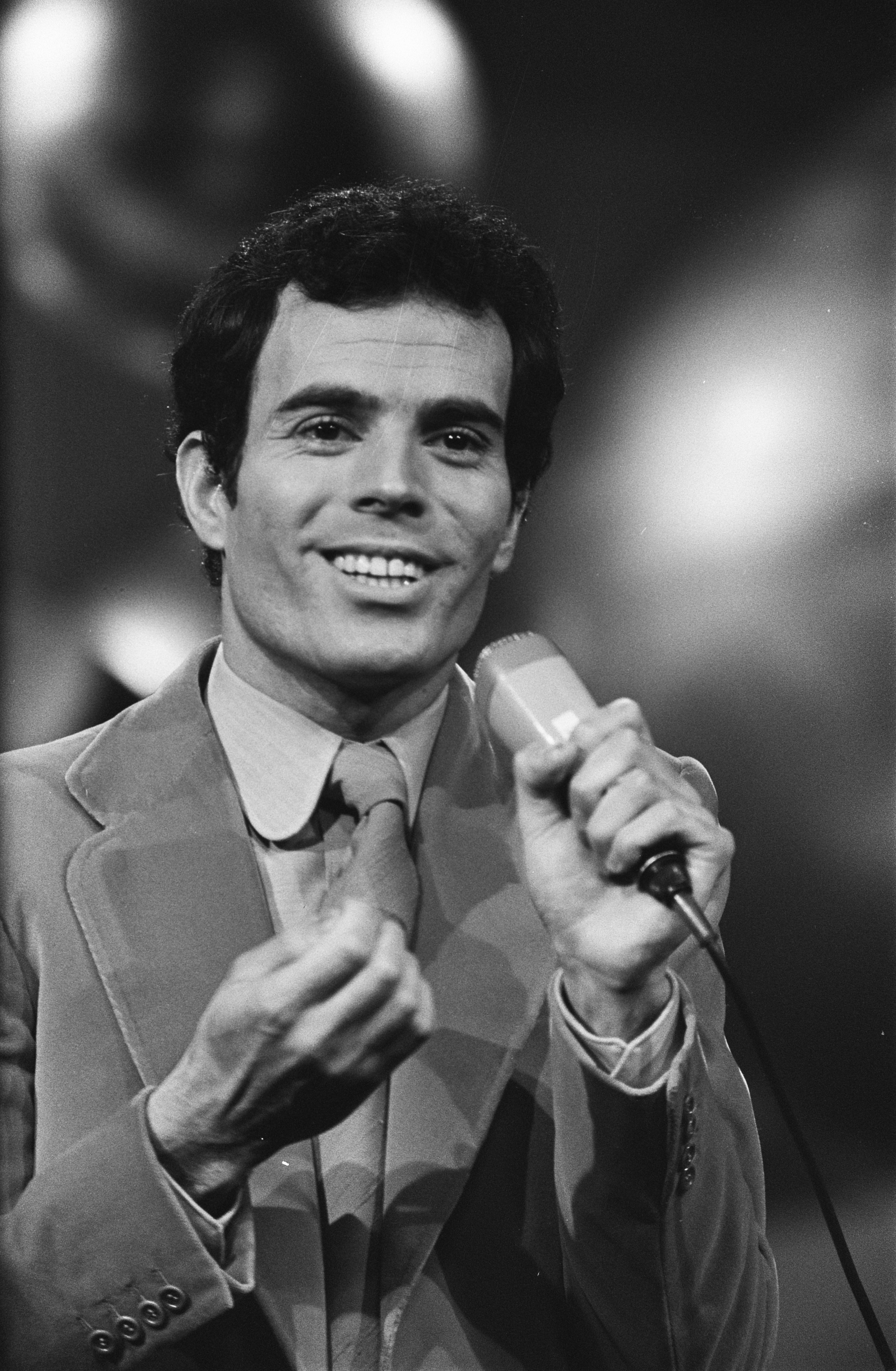
Julio Iglesias performing at Eurovision.

The Eurovision Song Contest 1970 was held on 21 March 1970 at the RAI Congrescentrum in Amsterdam, the Netherlands. Julio Iglesias performed "Gwendolyne" ninth in the running order, following Luxembourg and preceding Monaco. He was accompanied on stage by Trío La La La as backing singers. Augusto Algueró conducted the event's orchestra performance of the Spanish entry. The song received 8 votes, tying for the fourth place with France and Switzerland.

TVE broadcast the contest in Spain on TVE 1 with commentary by José Luis Uribarri.

=== Voting ===
TVE assembled a jury panel with ten members, with each member giving one vote to their favourite song. The following members comprised the Spanish jury:

- Juan Sierra y Gil de la Cuesta – lawyer and National Delegate of Culture (chairperson)
- María del Puy – actress
- Carlos Guisasola Estelar – vice president of the National Radio and Television Trade Union
- Blanca Núñez – fashion designer
- Pedro Ara Aísa – president of the Provincial Radio and Television Trade Union of Zaragoza and director of Radio Juventud de Zaragoza
- Javier Mateu – bachelor of physical sciences
- María Dolores García Rivas – agricultural technical engineer
- Juan Ignacio del Álamo – journalism student
- Lucía Cobo García – medical student
- Alfredo Medina del Río – agricultural mechanization technical engineer

The secretary was Ramón Rivera.

Votes awarded to Spain
Score	Country
3 votes	Italy; Monaco
2 votes	Luxembourg

Votes awarded by Spain
Score	Country
4 votes	Germany
3 votes	Ireland
2 votes	Italy
1 vote	Monaco
