= Gwendolyne =

1970 song by Julio Iglesias

Single by Julio Iglesias

from the album Gwendolyne
- Language: Spanish
- B-side: "Bla, bla, bla"
- Released: 1970
- Genre: Ballad
- Length: 2:39
- Label: Columbia
- Songwriter: Julio Iglesias
- Producer: Benito Lauret

Julio Iglesias singles chronology
| "Chiquilla" (1970) | "Gwendolyne" (1970) | "Un uomo solo" (1970) |

Audio
- "Gwendolyne" on YouTube

Eurovision Song Contest 1970 entry
- Country: Spain
- Artist: Julio Iglesias
- Language: Spanish
- Composer: Julio Iglesias
- Lyricist: Julio Iglesias
- Conductor: Augusto Algueró

Finals performance
- Final result: 4th
- Final points: 8

Entry chronology
- ◄ "Vivo cantando" (1969)
- "En un mundo nuevo" (1971) ►

Official performance video
- "Gwendolyne" on YouTube

"Gwendolyne" (Spanish pronunciation: [ɡwendoˈlin]), sometimes spelt "Gwendoline", is a song written and recorded by Spanish singer Julio Iglesias. It represented Spain in the Eurovision Song Contest 1970 held in Amsterdam, placing fourth.

Iglesias released the song in five languages: Spanish, English, French, German, and Italian. The single was also one of the final records to be issued in the by then obsolete 78 RPM format, only being released in that format by Columbia Records.

== Background ==
=== Conception ===
"Gwendolyne" is a ballad with music composed and Spanish lyrics written by Julio Iglesias. The song is about his first girlfriend, the titular Gwendolyne, a French girl whom he met at the age of twenty while still a law student and a goalkeeper for Spanish football team Real Madrid Castilla. In 1963, Iglesias was involved in a near-fatal car accident, which ended his football career, left him in rehabilitation for considerable time and indirectly led him to start learning the guitar, as a means of physical therapy.

Iglesias began composing his own music; in 1968 he entered and won the 10th edition of the Benidorm Song Festival with the song "La vida sigue igual" and shortly thereafter he signed with the Spanish branch of Columbia Records.

=== Eurovision ===
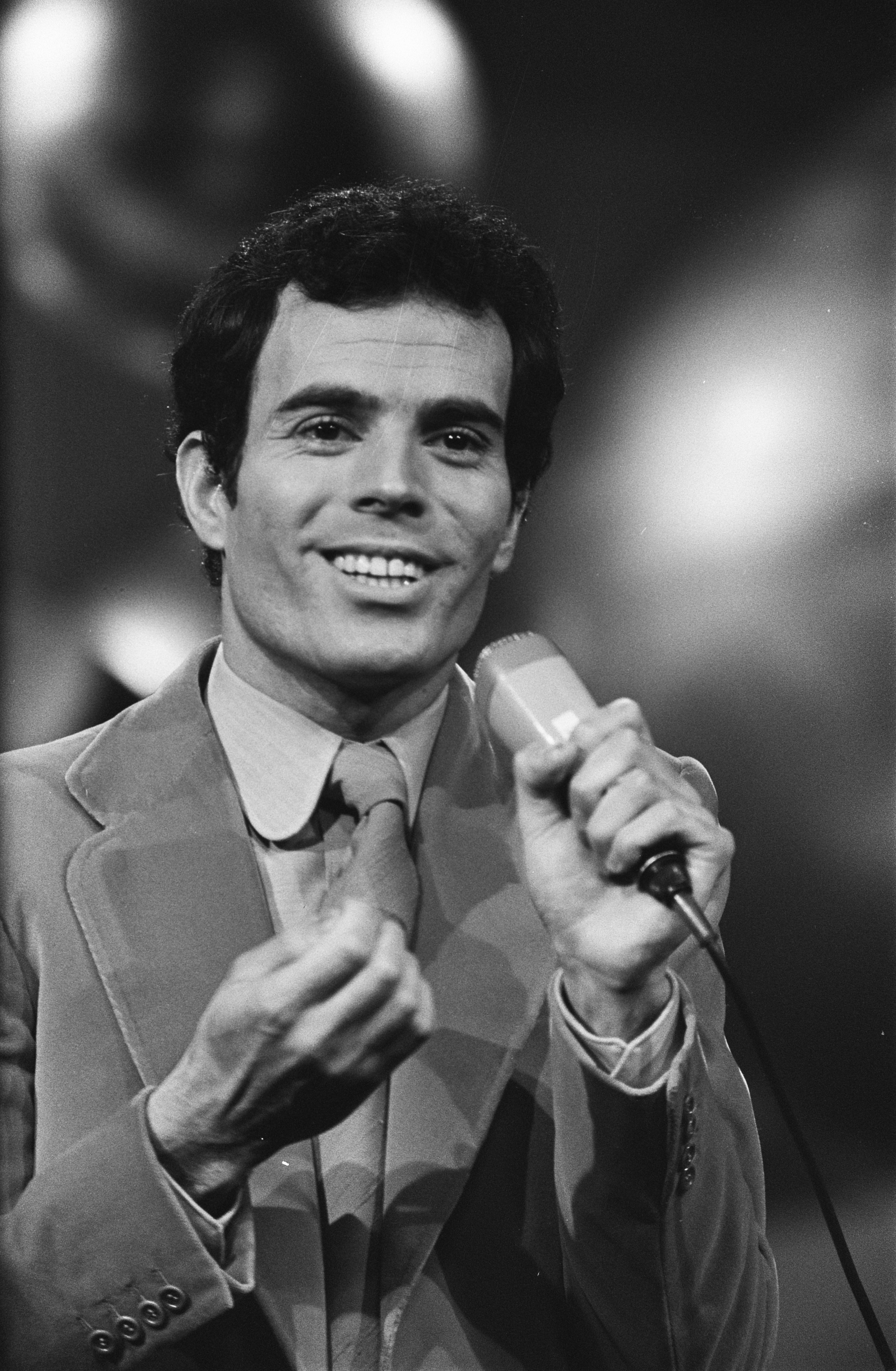
Julio Iglesias performing "Gwendolyne" at Eurovision.

On 12–14 February 1970, "Gwendolyne" performed by both Julio Iglesias and Rosy Armen competed in the 2nd edition of the Festival de la Canción Española, the national final organized by Televisión Española (TVE) to select its song and performer for the 15th edition of the Eurovision Song Contest. They both were accompanied on stage by Trío La La La –María Jesús Aguirre, Cristina Fernández, and Mercedes Valimaña– as backing singers. Benito Lauret conducted the event's live orchestra in their performances. The song won the competition so it became the Spanish entrant for Eurovision. As Rosy Armen was a French singer, Julio Iglesias became automatically its performer for the contest. He released "Gwendolyne" in five languages: Spanish, English –with lyrics by Marcel Stellman–, French, German, and Italian, and toured several European television stations promoting the song.

On 21 March 1970, the Eurovision Song Contest was held at the RAI Congrescentrum in Amsterdam hosted by Nederlandse Omroep Stichting (NOS), and broadcast live throughout the continent. Iglesias performed "Gwendolyne" ninth on the evening following Luxembourg's "Je suis tombé du ciel" by David Alexandre Winter and preceding Monaco's "Marlène" by Dominique Dussault. Augusto Algueró conducted the event's live orchestra in the performance of the Spanish entry. Iglesias was dressed entirely in sky blue. This was the color that looked best in black and white, since TVE –and many other broadcasters– did not broadcast in color yet. His suit had no pockets, since at TVE were afraid that he would put his hands in them during the performance as he used to do. He was accompanied on stage by Trío La La La as backing singers.

At the close of voting, the song had received eight points, placing fourth in a field of twelve, in a tie with "Marie-Blanche" by Guy Bonnet for France and "Retour" by Henri Dès for Switzerland. It received points only from the juries of Italy, Luxembourg, and Monaco. It was succeeded as Spanish entry at the 1971 contest by "En un mundo nuevo" by Karina.

=== Aftermath ===
His participation in Eurovision was his first major international television appearance. "Gwendolyne" went on to become his first number 1 single in Spain, where he gave forty-one concerts in forty-one different cities in just thirty days. It was also a modest commercial success in a few other countries in Europe and Latin America.

On 28 June 1970, TVE aired a special musical show filmed at the World Exposition 1970 in Osaka, directed by Valerio Lazarov and featuring Massiel, Karina, Julio Iglesias, and Miguel Ríos. Iglesias performed the German version of "Gwendolyne" at the Swiss pavilion as one of his acts. On 17 October 1970, Iglesias and Massiel hosted the first episode of Pasaporte a Dublín, the series produced by TVE to select its performer for the following Eurovision.

"Gwendolyne" was the title track to his second studio album released that same year. The album was later reissued in 1983, 1987, and 2017. During 1971, he achieved his first million album sales. His international breakthrough single "Un canto a Galicia" followed in 1972. By 1973, he had already sold his first ten million records.

Despite the great success that "Gwendolyne" gave him, he soon removed it from his repertoire since he does not like to remember it.

== Chart history ==
=== Weekly charts ===
| Chart (1970) | Peak position |
|---|---|
| Spain (List) | 1 |

== Legacy ==
=== Cover versions ===
The song was subsequently covered many times and released by different singers:

- Rosy Armen also released the song in 1970.
- Lola Flores covered the song in 1970.
- Salomé covered the song in 1970.
- Junco covered the song in his 1997 album De amor ya no se muere.
- Pitingo covered the song for the 2006 film Cándida.
- Rosario Flores covered the song in her 2009 album Cuéntame.

=== Other performances ===
- José Mercé performed the song in the show Europasión, aired on La 1 of Televisión Española on 21 May 2008 to choose by popular vote the best song that Spain has sent to Eurovision.
- In the show La mejor canción jamás cantada aired on La 1 of Televisión Española to choose by popular vote the best Spanish song ever sung, Carlos Right performed "Gwendolyne" in the episode dedicated to the 1970s, aired on 22 March 2019.
