= Mexico in the OTI Festival 1976 =

- OTI Festival 1976
- Participating broadcaster: Televisa
- Country: Mexico
- Selection process: National OTI Festival
- Selection date: 3 October 1976

Competing entry
- Song: "De que te quiero, te quiero"
- Artist: Gilberto Valenzuela
- Songwriters: Rubén Fuentes; Eduardo Magallanes; Mario Molina Montes

Placement
- Final result: 6th, 8 votes

Participation chronology
◄1975 •	1976	• 1977►

Mexico was represented at the OTI Festival 1976 with the song "De que te quiero, te quiero", written by Rubén Fuentes, Eduardo Magallanes, and Mario Molina Montes, and performed by Gilberto Valenzuela. The Mexican participating broadcaster, Televisa, selected its entry through a national televised competition with several phases. The song, that was performed in position 6, placed 6th out of 19 competing entries, with 8 votes. In addition, Televisa was also the host broadcaster and staged the event at the Teatro Juan Ruiz de Alarcón of the Centro de Convenciones in Acapulco, after winning the previous edition with the song "La felicidad" by Gualberto Castro.

== National stage ==
Televisa held a national competition with four televised qualifying rounds and a final to select its entry for the 5th edition of the OTI Festival. This fifth edition of the National OTI Festival featured 32 songs, of which eight reached the final.

The shows were held at Televisa San Ángel studios in Mexico City, were presented by Raúl Velasco, and were broadcast on Canal 2 within the show Siempre en Domingo. The musical director was Chucho Ferrrer, who conducted the orchestra when required. Hermanos Zavala, the single mixed backing choir, were credited on the songs they accompanied.

Competing entries on the National OTI Festival – Mexico 1976
Song	Artist	Songwriter(s)	Conductor
"A mis hermanos"	Sonia Rivas	Sonia Rivas	
"Amigo del universo"	Felipe Gil	Felipe Gil	
"Anhelos"	José María Napoleón	José María Napoleón	
"Canto latino"	María Medina	Jorge Patricio Flores; Jonathán Zarzosa	
"Carrusel"	Sergio Esquivel	Sergio Esquivel	
"Como un solo ser"	Macaria	Gualberto Castro	
"De que te quiero, te quiero"	Gilberto Valenzuela	Rubén Fuentes; Eduardo Magallanes; Mario Molina Montes	
"El más grande amor"	Héctor Meneses	Héctor Meneses	
"Enredadito por tu cintura"	Emmanuel	Emmanuel	
"Eres mi libertad"	Álvaro Dávila	Álvaro Dávila; Chamín Correa	
"Ese lugar"	Grupo Brujos y Brujas	Jorge Patricio Flores; Jonathán Zarzosa	
"Has triunfado amor"	Irma Carlón	Irma Carlón	
"Hazme reír"	Mister Loco	Jorge García Castil	
"Hoy voy a cantar"	Sonia Rivas	Enrique Velázquez	
"La muñeca olvidada"	Tirzo Paiz	Tirzo Paiz	
"La vida te llamas tú"	Héctor Meneses	Héctor Meneses	
"Libre no me importa a dónde voy"	Manolo Muñoz	Rubén Rodríguez	
"Mi oficio se llama vida"	Enrique Cáceres	Ignacio Nacho	
"Morir viviendo"	Martha Alicia Becerra	Ladislao Juárez Ponce	
"No tengo miedo de marcharme"	Enrique Cáceres	Mónica Ygual	
"Nuevamente volveré"	Álvaro Dávila	Álvaro Dávila	
"Por conocer el amor"	Fernando Riba	Sergio Esquivel	
"Quiero ser como gaviota"	Martha Caramelo	Miguel Reyes; Rogelio A. González	
"Sola en la ciudad"	Patricio	José Luis Gómez; Raúl Bermejo	
"Te recuerdo igual"	Martha Caramelo	Rogelio González; Miguel Reyes	
"Tengo ganas"	Fernando Riba	Lalo Carrión; Ragoso	
"Todo lo tendrás"	Grupo Brujos y Brujas	Sergio Luna	
"Vive"	José María Napoleón	José María Napoleón	
"Vivir para amar"	Alejandra	Beto y Pepe	
"Volarás"	Felipe Gil	Felipe Gil	
"Volemos juntos"	Mister Loco	Jorge García Castil	
"Vuelves a casa"	María Medina	Mario Arturo; Mario Patrón	

=== Qualifying rounds ===
The four qualifying rounds were held on Sundays 5, 12, 19, and 26 September 1976. The eight highest-scoring entries among the 32 competing advanced to the final.

Qualifier

Result of the qualifying rounds of the National OTI Festival – Mexico 1976
R/O	Song	Artist	Result
First qualifying round – 5 September 1976
1	"Todo lo tendrás"	Grupo Brujos y Brujas	—N/a
2	"Enredadito por tu cintura"	Emmanuel	—N/a
3	"Te recuerdo igual"	Martha Caramelo	—N/a
4	"Tengo ganas"	Fernando Riba	—N/a
5	"Libre no me importa a dónde voy"	Manolo Muñoz	—N/a
6	"Vive"	José María Napoleón	Qualified
7	"Eres mi libertad"	Álvaro Dávila	—N/a
8	"A mis hermanos"	Sonia Rivas	—N/a
Second qualifying round – 12 September 1976
1	"Volemos juntos"	Mister Loco	—N/a
2	"Vivir para amar"	Alejandra	—N/a
3	"Volarás"	Felipe Gil	Qualified
4	"Sola en la ciudad"	Patricio	—N/a
5	"Morir viviendo"	Martha Alicia Becerra	—N/a
6	"La vida te llamas tú"	Héctor Meneses	Qualified
7	"No tengo miedo de marcharme"	Enrique Cáceres	—N/a
8	"Vuelves a casa"	María Medina	—N/a
Third qualifying round – 19 September 1976
1	"Has triunfado amor"	Irma Carlón	—N/a
2	"Anhelos"	José María Napoleón	—N/a
3	"Hoy voy a cantar"	Sonia Rivas	—N/a
4	"Ese lugar"	Grupo Brujos y Brujas	Qualified
5	"Por conocer el amor"	Fernando Riba	—N/a
6	"Quiero ser como gaviota"	Martha Caramelo	—N/a
7	"La muñeca olvidada"	Tirzo Paiz	—N/a
8	"Carrusel"	Sergio Esquivel	—N/a
Fourth qualifying round – 26 September 1976
1	"Nuevamente volveré"	Álvaro Dávila	—N/a
2	"Mi oficio se llama vida"	Enrique Cáceres	—N/a
3	"Como un solo ser"	Macaria	—N/a
4	"De que te quiero, te quiero"	Gilberto Valenzuela	Qualified
5	"Hazme reír"	Mister Loco	—N/a
6	"El más grande amor"	Héctor Meneses	Qualified
7	"Canto latino"	María Medina	Qualified
8	"Amigo del universo"	Felipe Gil	Qualified

=== Final ===
The eight-song final was held on Sunday 3 October 1976. The winner was "De que te quiero, te quiero", written by Rubén Fuentes, Eduardo Magallanes, and Mario Molina Montes, and performed by Gilberto Valenzuela. The festival ended with a reprise of the winning entry.

Winner

Result of the final of the National OTI Festival – Mexico 1976
R/O	Song	Artist	Points	Place
1	"Amigo del universo"	Felipe Gil		3
2	"El más grande amor"	Héctor Meneses		2
3	"De que te quiero, te quiero"	Gilberto Valenzuela	140	1
4	"Vive"	José María Napoleón		4
5	"Volarás"	Felipe Gil		
6	"Canto latino"	María Medina		5
7	"La vida te llamas tú"	Héctor Meneses		5
8	"Ese lugar"	Grupo Brujos y Brujas		

== At the OTI Festival ==
On 30 October 1976, the OTI Festival was held at the Teatro Juan Ruiz de Alarcón of the Centro de Convenciones in Acapulco, hosted by Televisa, and broadcast live throughout Ibero-America. Gilberto Valenzuela performed "De que te quiero, te quiero" in position 6, placing 6th out of 19 competing entries, with eight votes.
