= María Ostiz =

Spanish singer-songwriter (born 1944)

- Born: María Dolores Ostiz Espila; 8 June 1944 (age 82); Avilés, Spain
- Occupation: Singer-songwriter
- Spouse: Ignacio Zoco (m. 1969; died 2015)

María Dolores Ostiz Espila (born 8 June 1944), better known as María Ostiz, is a Spanish singer-songwriter. Her best-known songs, written and performed by herself, are "Un pueblo es" and "Canta cigarra". With the latter, representing Spain, she won the OTI Festival 1976.

== Biography ==
María Ostiz was born in Avilés on 8 June 1944. Her parents were Juan Ostiz and Babila Espila. Three months later, they moved to Pamplona. In 1969, she married footballer Ignacio Zoco, with whom she remained married until his death in 2015. They had three children.

In 1965, Ostiz recorded her first album as a singer, after which she also began recording her first compositions. Her own musical style is as a soloist singer of acoustic character and popular and folk influences. In 1970, her rendition of the folk song "N'a veiriña do mar" topped the singles chart in Spain for four weeks.

In 1976, Televisión Española internally selected her and her song "Canta cigarra" to represent Spain in the OTI Festival 1976. On 30 October, she performed the song in the festival in Acapulco, accompanied by the event's orchestra conducted by Rafael Ibarbia, and winning the competition, becoming the first victory for Spain in the festival. In 1977, she released her best-known song, "Un pueblo es".

== Discography ==
- Buscando amor (1965) (EP)
- María Ostiz (1967)
- María Ostiz (1968)
- Canta canta... (1970)
- Las alegrías se van (1972)
- Lo mejor de María Ostiz (1973)
- Pinceladas (1975)
- Canta cigarra (1976)
- Un pueblo es... levantaré (1977)
- Sueño de un hombre cansado (1980)
- María Ostiz (1980)
- Lo mejor de María Ostiz vol. II (1983)
- Mujer (1987)
- María Ostiz: Éxitos de dos en dos (1967-1978) (1998)
- Maria Ostiz – 24 Grandes Éxitos (2001)
