= Alejandro Romualdo =

Peruvian poet

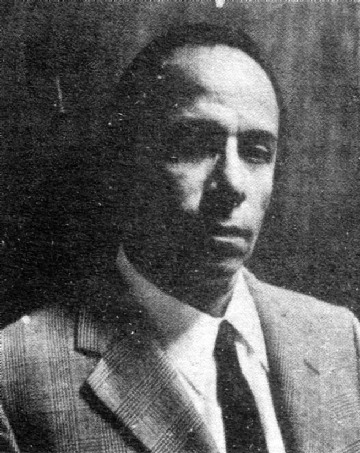
- Alejandro Romualdo, c. 1942
- Born: Alejandro Romualdo Valle Palomino; 19 December 1926; Trujillo, Peru
- Died: 27 May 2008 (aged 81); Lima, Peru

Alejandro Romualdo Valle Palomino (December 19, 1926 in Trujillo, Peru – May 27, 2008 in Lima, Peru) was a Peruvian poet of the 20th century. His best known work is the Song of Tupac Amaru, exalting the revolutionary spirit of the 18th-century leader. The poem, which glorified the Peruvian independence movement, won the Peruvian National Prize for Poetry in 1997.

== Life ==
Born Alejandro Romualdo Valle Palomino, he is the son of famed Peruvian actor, Álex Valle, star of the popular television series Risas y salsa. Alejandro Romualdo studied literature at the National University of San Marcos in 1946. His first poem, "La torre de los alucinados" made him the recipient of the Peruvian National Prize for Poetry in 1949. Having earned a scholarship, he attended the University of Madrid in 1951. Upon his return to Peru, he worked as a journalist as more of his works were published, which he used as an instrument of agitation and political propaganda that manifested his Marxist convictions. By the mid 1960s, he travelled to Mexico and Cuba, eventually returning to Peru where he had some temporary jobs, one of them at the National Institute of Culture and also working as a professor of journalism at University of San Martín de Porres in Lima.

He married Teresa Pereira (d. 1998) and had two sons and a daughter.

He dedicated himself to teaching and journalism. He collaborated in the newspapers La Crónica and La Prensa, and in the magazines Cultura Peruana and Idea. His poetry, articles and caricatures, appear signed with his prename of Alejandro Romualdo; also with his nickname Xanno.

In 1965 he traveled to Mexico and then went to Cuba. Back in Peru he had some temporary jobs, one of them at the National Institute of Culture. He then went on to teach at the University of San Martín de Porres, becoming a teacher for several generations of journalists.

In 1976, his poem "Quiero salir al sol", set to music by Ernesto Pollarolo, and performed by Fernando Llosa, represented Peru in the OTI Festival 1976. He collaborated in the arts and letters magazine Hueso Hmero (1987, 1990).

== Death ==
Alejandro Romualdo was found dead in his home from heart complications in San Isidro District, Lima.

== See also ==
- Peruvian literature

== Bibliography ==
- Luis Alberto Sánchez,: La literatura peruana. Derrotero para una historia cultural del Perú, tomo V, pp. 1581-1582. Cuarta edición y definitiva. Lima, P. L. Villanueva Editor, 1975.
- National Library of Peru, N.º 2012-03529. Toro Montalvo, César: Manual de Literatura Peruana, Tomo II, p. 1452. A.F.A. Editores Importadores S.A. Tercera edición, corregida y aumentada, 2012. Hecho el depósito legal.
- Mario Vargas Llosa, El pez en el agua. Memorias. Editorial Seix Barral, S. A., 1993. ISBN 84-322-0679-2
