= Chile in the OTI Festival 1976 =

- OTI Festival 1976
- Participating broadcasters: Televisión Nacional de Chile (TVN); Corporación de Televisión de la Universidad Católica de Chile (UCTV)
- Country: Chile
- Selection process: 2º Festival primavera una canción
- Selection date: 13 October 1976

Competing entry
- Song: "Era sólo un chiquillo"
- Artist: José Alfredo Fuentes
- Songwriters: José Alfredo Fuentes; Óscar Cáceres

Placement
- Final result: 3rd, 12 votes

Participation chronology
◄1975 •	1976	• 1977►

Chile was represented at the OTI Festival 1976 with the song "Era sólo un chiquillo", written by José Alfredo Fuentes and Óscar Cáceres, and performed by Fuentes himself. The Chilean participating broadcasters, Televisión Nacional de Chile (TVN) and Corporación de Televisión de la Universidad Católica de Chile (UCTV), jointly selected their entry through a national televised competition with several phases. The song, that was performed in position 8, placed third out of 19 competing entries, with 12 points.

== National stage ==
Televisión Nacional de Chile (TVN) and Corporación de Televisión de la Universidad Católica de Chile (UCTV), used the second edition of Festival primavera una canción as a national competition to select their entry for the 5th edition of the OTI Festival. The festival featured twenty entries in two televised qualifying rounds of ten songs each, of which ten reached the final. In addition to the general competition, awards were given for Best Performer and for Originality to one song.

The shows were held at Teatro Astor in Santiago, were presented by Antonio Vodanovic and Marisa Sepúlveda, and were broadcast on TVN's Canal 7, with UCTV's Canal 13 broadcasting only the final. The musical director was Horacio Saavedra, who conducted the orchestra when required.

Competing entries on Primavera una canción 1978
Song	Artist	Songwriter(s)
"Acabas de nacer"	Los Alfiles Negros	Fernando Ferrada
"Amar, amar, amar"	Patricio Carvallo	Osvaldo Jeldres
"Aquellos tiernos años"	Juan Eduardo	Rodolfo Moya; Marcos Torres
"Ayer plantamos"	Ricardo de la Fuente	Ricardo de la Fuente
"Canción del río"	Norman	Jaime Sasmay
"Como las aves"	Eduardo Santa	Jorge Vida; Humberto Salse
"Como nosotros ayer"	Osvaldo Carrasco	Fernando Pávez; Daniel Lencina
"Cruz de estrellas"	Jorge Cavada	Scottie Scott
"Era sólo un chiquillo"	José Alfredo Fuentes	Óscar Cáceres; José Alfredo Fuentes
"Felicidad, niña, felicidad"	Silverio Pintor	Silverio Pintor
"Hoy después de mucho tiempo"	Patricia Maldonado	Luis Miguel Silva
"Invitación"	Gloria Benavides	Luis Riderelli
"Las cosas sencillas"	Yolanda Urrutia	Yolanda Urrutia
"Maestro de escuela rural"	Luz Eliana	Luis "Poncho" Venegas
"No preguntes por qué"	Mariela González	Mariela González
"Otra noche pasaré"	Samuel Valenzuela	Samuel Valenzuela
"Reflexiones"	Osvaldo Díaz	María Angélica Ramírez
"Tristeza por ti"	Verónica Hurtado	Nelson Soza Montenegro
"Un amante y un adiós"	Silvana Bianchi	Juan Pablo Mellado
"Ven conmigo y canta"	Alejandro	Paola Sola; Fernando Rencoret; Alejandro

=== Qualifying rounds ===
The two qualifying rounds were held on Monday 11 and Tuesday 12 October 1976, beginning at 22:00 CLST (01:00+1 UTC). There were ten entries in each round, of which the ten highest-scoring entries in each round advanced to the final. The first round featured guest performances by Paolo Salvatore, Los Red Juniors, and Coco Legrand, and the second round guest performances by the cast of Música libre, Roberto Valdés, and Jorge Cruz.

The jury in both rounds was composed of the following six record label executives: Roberto Inglez, Jorge Undurraga, Jorge Oñate, Camilo Fernández, Luis Torrejón, and Cristian Livingstone.

Qualifier

Result of the first qualifying round of Primavera una canción 1978
R/O	Song	Artist	Result
1	"Reflexiones"	Osvaldo Díaz	Qualified
2	"Invitación"	Gloria Benavides	Qualified
3	"Ayer plantamos"	Ricardo de la Fuente	Qualified
4	"Un amante y un adiós"	Silvana Bianchi	—N/a
5	"Felicidad, niña, felicidad"	Silverio Pintor	—N/a
6	"Como nosotros ayer"	Osvaldo Carrasco	Qualified
7	"No preguntes por qué"	Mariela González	—N/a
8	"Acabas de nacer"	Los Alfiles Negros	—N/a
9	"Canción del río"	Norman	—N/a
10	"Hoy después de mucho tiempo"	Patricia Maldonado	Qualified

Result of the second qualifying round of Primavera una canción 1978
R/O	Song	Artist	Result
1	"Era sólo un chiquillo"	José Alfredo Fuentes	Qualified
2	"Maestro de escuela rural"	Luz Eliana	Qualified
3	"Cruz de estrellas"	Jorge Cavada	—N/a
4	"Tristeza por ti"	Verónica Hurtado	—N/a
5	"Como las aves"	Eduardo Santa	—N/a
6	"Amar, amar, amar"	Patricio Carvallo	Qualified
7	"Ven conmigo y canta"	Alejandro	—N/a
8	"Aquellos tiernos años"	Juan Eduardo	—N/a
9	"Las cosas sencillas"	Yolanda Urrutia	Qualified
10	"Otra noche pasaré"	Samuel Valenzuela	Qualified

=== Final ===
The final was held on Wednesday 13 October 1976, beginning at 22:00 CLST (01:00+1 UTC). It featured guest performances by Juan Carlos Calderón, Sergio y Estíbaliz (who performed among other songs "Si vas para Chile"), Don Francisco, and Mandolino.

The jury in the final consisted of seven members, of which each of the broadcasters appointed three: TVN appointed Camilo Fernández, Horacio Hernández, Oro Colodro; UCTV appointed Benjamín Mackenna, Raúl de Ramón, and Valentín Trujillo; and Octavio Espinoza was the seventh juror. Each of them had three votes to distribute as they wished.

The winner was "Era sólo un chiquillo", written by José Alfredo Fuentes and Óscar Cáceres, and performed by Fuentes himself; with "Reflexiones", written by María Angélica Ramírez, and performed by Osvaldo Díaz placing second; and "Ayer plantamos", written and performed by Ricardo de la Fuente, and "Maestro de escuela rural", written by Luis "Poncho" Venegas, and performed by Luz Eliana both placing third. The first prize was endowed with a monetary amount of CLP$20,000, the second prize of CLP$10,000, and the third prize of CLP$5,000; with all participants, both performers and songwriters, receiving a golden key. Luz Eliana also received the Best Performer Award, and Silverio Pintor for "Felicidad, niña, felicidad" the Originality Award.

Winner

Result of the final of Primavera una canción 1978
R/O	Song	Artist	Votes	Result
	"Amar, amar, amar"	Patricio Carvallo	0	—N/a
	"Ayer plantamos"	Ricardo de la Fuente	1	3
	"Como nosotros ayer"	Osvaldo Carrasco	0	—N/a
	"Era sólo un chiquillo"	José Alfredo Fuentes	11	1
	"Hoy después de mucho tiempo"	Patricia Maldonado	0	—N/a
	"Invitación"	Gloria Benavides	0	—N/a
	"Las cosas sencillas"	Yolanda Urrutia	0	—N/a
	"Maestro de escuela rural"	Luz Eliana	1	3
	"Otra noche pasaré"	Samuel Valenzuela	0	—N/a
	"Reflexiones"	Osvaldo Díaz	8	2

Detailed vote of the final of Primavera una canción 1978
R/O	Song	Benjamín Mackenna	Horacio Hernández	Valentín Trujillo	Oro Colodro	Octavio Espinoza	Raúl de Ramón	Camilo Fernández	Total
	"Amar, amar, amar"								0
	"Ayer plantamos"	1							1
	"Como nosotros ayer"								0
	"Era sólo un chiquillo"	1	1	2	1	2	1	3	11
	"Hoy después de mucho tiempo"								0
	"Invitación"								0
	"Las cosas sencillas"								0
	"Maestro de escuela rural"		1						1
	"Otra noche pasaré"								0
	"Reflexiones"	1	1	1	2	1	2		8

== At the OTI Festival ==
On 30 October 1976, the OTI Festival was held at the Teatro Juan Ruiz de Alarcón of the Centro de Convenciones in Acapulco, Mexico, hosted by Televisa, and broadcast live throughout Ibero-America. José Alfredo Fuentes performed "Era sólo un chiquillo" in position 8, with Horacio Saavedra conducting the event's orchestra, placing third out of 19 competing entries, with 12 points.

The festival was broadcast on TVN's Canal 7 and UCTV's Canal 13 on delay at 22:05 CLST (01:05+1 UTC). With Antonio Vodanovic and Gina Zuanic presenting the local opt-out from the TVN studios, and with Vodanovic acting as spokesperson who announced the Chilean jury's vote.
