= List of number-one singles of 1970 (Spain) =

This is a list of the Spanish Singles number-ones of 1970.

== Chart history ==
Issue date	Song	Artist
5 January	"Sugar, Sugar"	The Archies
12 January	"Sugar, Sugar"	The Archies
19 January	"Paxarinos"	Víctor Manuel
26 January	"Paxarinos"	Víctor Manuel
2 February	"Himno A La Alegría"	Miguel Ríos
9 February	"Venus"	The Shocking Blue
16 February	"Venus"	The Shocking Blue
23 February	"Venus"	The Shocking Blue
2 March	"Venus"	The Shocking Blue
9 March	"Venus"	The Shocking Blue
16 March	"Venus"	The Shocking Blue
23 March	"Venus"	The Shocking Blue
30 March	"Venus"	The Shocking Blue
6 April	"Gwendolyne"	Julio Iglesias
13 April	"Gwendolyne"	Julio Iglesias
20 April	"Gwendolyne"	Julio Iglesias
27 April	"Gwendolyne"	Julio Iglesias
4 May	"Gwendolyne"	Julio Iglesias
11 May	"Gwendolyne"	Julio Iglesias
18 May	"Gwendolyne"	Julio Iglesias
25 May	"Gwendolyne"	Julio Iglesias
1 June	"Un Rayo De Sol"	Los Diablos
8 June	"Un Rayo De Sol"	Los Diablos
15 June	"Un Rayo De Sol"	Los Diablos
22 June	"Un Rayo De Sol"	Los Diablos
29 June	"Un Rayo De Sol"	Los Diablos
6 July	"Un Rayo De Sol"	Los Diablos
13 July	"Un Rayo De Sol"	Los Diablos
20 July	"Un Rayo De Sol"	Los Diablos
27 July	"Un Rayo De Sol"	Los Diablos
3 August	"Un Rayo De Sol"	Los Diablos
10 August	"Un Rayo De Sol"	Los Diablos
17 August	"Un Rayo De Sol"	Los Diablos
24 August	"Un Rayo De Sol"	Los Diablos
31 August	"Un Rayo De Sol"	Los Diablos
7 September	"Corpiño Xeitoso"	Andrés Do Barro
14 September	"In The Summertime"	Mungo Jerry
21 September	"In The Summertime"	Mungo Jerry
28 September	"El Cóndor Pasa"	Simon & Garfunkel
5 October	"El Cóndor Pasa"	Simon & Garfunkel
12 October	"In The Summertime"	Mungo Jerry
19 October	"In The Summertime"	Mungo Jerry
26 October	"Yellow River"	Christie
2 November	"In The Summertime"	Mungo Jerry
9 November	"Quiero Abrazarte Tanto"	Víctor Manuel
16 November	"N'A Veiriña Do Mar"	María Ostiz
23 November	"N'A Veiriña Do Mar"	María Ostiz
30 November	"N'A Veiriña Do Mar"	María Ostiz
7 December	"N'A Veiriña Do Mar"	María Ostiz
14 December	"N'A Veiriña Do Mar"	María Ostiz
21 December	"Te quiero, Te Quiero"	Nino Bravo
28 December	"Te quiero, Te Quiero"	Nino Bravo

== See also ==
- 1970 in music
- List of number-one hits (Spain)
