= Belgium in the Eurovision Song Contest 1970 =

- Eurovision Song Contest 1970
- Participating broadcaster: Radiodiffusion-télévision belge (RTB)
- Country: Belgium
- Selection process: Chansons Euro '70
- Selection date: 3 February 1970

Competing entry
- Song: "Viens l'oublier"
- Artist: Jean Vallée
- Songwriter: Jean Vallée

Placement
- Final result: 8th, 5 points

Participation chronology

Belgium was represented at the Eurovision Song Contest 1970 with the song "Viens l'oublier", written and performed by Jean Vallée. The Belgian participating broadcaster, French-speaking Radiodiffusion-télévision belge (RTB), selected its entry through a national final.

== Before Eurovision ==
=== Chansons Euro '70 ===
==== Format ====
Chansons Euro '70 consisted of nine shows; six quarter-finals, two semi-finals, and a final. In each quarter-final there were six songs where the top two qualified for the semi-finals. Each semi-final had six songs where the top three qualified to the final, which would then have six songs. All shows were hosted by Claude Delacroix.

Chansons Euro '70 also went by an alternative name in French-language newspapers: 09.36.70. The numbers represented the number of shows in the national final, the total number of songs competing, and the year. The name would change as the national final went on, and instead represented the number of shows left, the number of songs still left in the competition, and the year.

==== Competing Entries ====
RTB received 350 submissions, from which 36, by 20 different artists, were chosen to participate in the national final.

Competing entries
Artist	Song	Songwriter(s)	
Artist	Song	Composer(s)	Lyricist(s)
Andrée Simons	"La belle époque"	Andrée Simons	
Andrée Simons	"Perle d'etoile"	Andrée Simons, Luc D'Avray	
Ann Christy	"Le vent, le temps"	Unknown	
Ann Christy	"Merci, printemps"	Claude Lombard, Freddy Zeggers	
Bébé Hong-Suong	"La fête aus musiciens"	Unknown	
Bébé Hong-Suong	"Le temps d'avril"	Unknown	
Bébé Hong-Suong	"On m'avait dit"	Unknown	
Bébé Hong-Suong	"Triste été"	Unknown	
Cecily Forde	"Mon amour est tombé du nid"	R. Morès, P. Philippe	
Cecily Forde	"Prends ma main"	Harry Frekin, Cecily Forde	
Concetta di Maria	"Marche le temps"	Unknown	
Concetta di Maria	"Oui, mais quand"	Raymond Vincent, Igor Minarief	
Eddy Pascal	"Oublie que tu l'aimes"	Unknown	
Eddy Pascal	"Virginia"	G. Houssa	
Frédéric François	"Comme tous les amoureux"	Frédéric François	Marino Atria, Alain Darmor
Jacques Albin	"Chatte"	J.C. Albin	
Jean Narcy	"Une rose"	Hector Delfosse, J. Postula, C. Avanches	
Jean Vallée	"Viens l'oublier"	Jean Vallée	
Joanna	"A huit heurs au printemps"	Unknown	
Joanna	"Flash-back"	Unknown	
Johnny White	"Mary-Ann"	Unknown	
Johnny White	"Quand on est amoureux"	Peter Laine, A. Hoppe	
Josiane Janvier	"Tu seras celui-là"	Hector Delfosse	Claude Avranches
Lucienne Troka	"Dix épines pour une rose"	Unknown	
Lucienne Troka	"Toi soleil"	Unknown	
Marc Bertrand	"Ne prends pas le temps comme il vient"	Jean-Pierre Pleyel	
Marc Bertrand	"Notre raison de vivre"	Jean-Pierre Pleyel, Jean-Marc Bertrand	
Miles Kovac	"Mélodie d'automne"	Unknown	
Nicole Josy	"C'est toi qui as raison"	Unknown	
Nicole Josy	"Je n'en reviens pas"	Unknown	
Rosy Dany	"Ce n'etait que l'amour"	Unknown	
Rosy Dany	"Et moi je chante"	Unknown	
Serge & Christine Ghisoland	"Laï laï laï"	Serge Ghisoland	Pierre Coran
Serge & Christine Ghisoland	"Nous serons toi et moi"	Serge Ghisoland	Pierre Coran
Serge Davignac	"La vie"	Roland Thyssen, Serge Davignac	
Serge Davignac	"Monsieur du printemps"	Unknown	

==== Shows ====
===== Quarter-finals =====
The qualifiers in the quarter-finals were decided by a jury and postcard voting. The song that scored the highest with the juries and the song that scored the highest with the public postcard voting, as long as it hadn't already qualified with the juries, would qualify to the semi-finals. The jury consisted of 100 people across 10 cities in Belgium who would be phoned and asked to vote for 1 song. Since the postcard voting started after the semi-final had already taken place and the jury qualifier was already known, the jury winner would often place last in the postcard voting.

The jury points for Quarter-final 5 are unknown.

Quarter-final 1 - 09.36.70 - 14 October 1969
R/O	Artist	Song	Jury		Public	Result
R/O	Artist	Song	Points	Place	Public	Result
1	Bébé Hong-Suong	"Le temps d'avril"	19	3	4	—N/a
2	Eddy Pascal	"Oublie que tu l'aimes"	0	6	5	—N/a
3	Cecily Forde	"Mon amour est tombé du nid"	9	4	3	—N/a
4	Serge & Christine Ghisoland	"Laï laï laï"	49	1	6	Jury Qualifier
5	Ann Christy	"Le vent, le temps"	20	2	1	Public Qualifier
6	Concetta di Maria	"Marche le temps"	3	5	2	—N/a

Quarter-final 2 - 08.32.70 - 28 October 1969
R/O	Artist	Song	Jury		Public	Result
R/O	Artist	Song	Points	Place	Public	Result
1	Rosy Dany	"Et moi je chante"	4	5	4	—N/a
2	Serge Davignac	"La vie"	16	3	2	—N/a
3	Nicole Josy	"Je n'en reviens pas"	12	4	3	—N/a
4	Jean Vallée	"Viens l'oublier"	40	1	5	Jury Qualifier
5	Joanna	"Flash-back"	1	6	6	—N/a
6	Marc Bertrand	"Ne prends pas le temps comme il vient"	27	2	1	Public Qualifier

Quarter-final 3 - 07.28.70 - 11 November 1969
R/O	Artist	Song	Jury		Public	Result
R/O	Artist	Song	Points	Place	Public	Result
1	Eddy Pascal	"Virginia"	15	2	1	Public Qualifier
2	Josiane Janvier	"Tu seras celui-là"	6	5	3	—N/a
3	Johnny White	"Mary-Ann"	9	4	2	—N/a
4	Bébé Hong-Suong	"On m'avait dit"	11	3	4	—N/a
5	Jacques Albin	"Chatte"	3	6	5	—N/a
6	Andrée Simons	"La belle époque"	56	1	6	Jury Qualifier

Quarter-final 4 - 06.24.70 - 25 November 1969
R/O	Artist	Song	Jury		Public	Result
R/O	Artist	Song	Points	Place	Public	Result
1	Miles Kovacs	"Mélodie d'automne"	1	6	5	—N/a
2	Lucienne Troka	"Toi soleil"	5	5	4	—N/a
3	Jean Narcy	"Une rose"	10	4	2	—N/a
4	Andrée Simons	"Perle d'etoile"	42	1	6	Jury Qualifier
5	Frédéric François	"Comme tous les amoureux"	28	2	1	Public Qualifier
6	Ann Christy	"Merci, printemps"	14	3	3	—N/a

Quarter-final 5 - 05.20.70 - 9 December 1969
R/O	Artist	Song	Jury	Public	Result
1	Rosy Dany	"Ce n'etait que l'amour"	3	2	—N/a
2	Marc Bertrand	"Notre raison de vivre"	2	1	Public Qualifier
3	Concetta di Maria	"Oui, mais quand"	5	3	—N/a
4	Bébé Hong-Suong	"Triste été"	4	4	—N/a
5	Serge & Christine Ghisoland	"Nous serons toi et moi"	1	6	Jury Qualifier
6	Nicole Josy	"C'est toi qui as raison"	6	5	—N/a

Quarter-final 6 - 04.16.70 - 23 December 1969
R/O	Artist	Song	Jury		Public	Result
R/O	Artist	Song	Points	Place	Public	Result
1	Bébé Hong-Suong	"La fête aus musiciens"	5	4	3	—N/a
2	Cecily Forde	"Prends ma main"	5	4	4	—N/a
3	Serge Davignac	"Monsieur du printemps"	20	2	1	Public Qualifier
4	Lucienne Troka	"Dix épines pour une rose"	15	3	2	—N/a
5	Joanna	"A huit heurs au printemps"	5	4	5	—N/a
6	Johnny White	"Quand on est amoureux"	50	1	6	Jury Qualifier

===== Semi-finals =====
The qualifiers in the semi-finals were decided by two different juries and a public postcard vote. The first jury (Jury A) consisted of 100 people across 10 cities in Belgium who would be phoned and asked to vote for 1 song. The second jury (Jury B) consisted of 100 young people who each voted for a song. Jury A and Jury B voted simultaneously but since the postcard voting started after the semi-final had already taken place and the jury qualifiers were already known, the jury qualifiers would often place low in the public vote. The winner of each jury and public vote qualified; Jury A's qualifier was decided first, then Jury B then the public.

Semi-final 1 - 03.12.70 - 6 January 1970
R/O	Artist	Song	Jury A Points		Jury B Points		Public	Result
R/O	Artist	Song	Points	Place	Points	Place	Public	Result
1	Andrée Simons	"Perle d'étoile"	11	2	24	3	1	Public Qualifier
2	Serge & Christine Ghisoland	"Nous serons toi et moi"	10	3	25	2	5	Jury B Qualifier
3	Ann Christy	"Le vent, le temps"	10	3	Unknown	Unknown	4	—N/a
4	Marc Bertrand	"Notre raison de vivre"	8	5	Unknown	Unknown	2	—N/a
5	Eddy Pascal	"Virginia"	6	6	Unknown	Unknown	3	—N/a
6	Jean Vallée	"Viens l'oublier"	55	1	48	1	6	Jury A Qualifier

Semi-final 2 - 02.09.70 - 20 January 1970
R/O	Artist	Song	Jury A Points		Jury B Points		Public	Result
R/O	Artist	Song	Points	Place	Points	Place	Public	Result
1	Johnny White	"Quand on est amoureux"	16	3	Unknown	Unknown	1	Public Qualifier
2	Andrée Simons	"La belle époque"	38	1	Unknown	Unknown	6	Jury A Qualifier
3	Marc Bertrand	"Ne prends pas la vie comme elle vient"	12	4	Unknown	Unknown	2	—N/a
4	Serge & Christine Ghisoland	"Laï laï laï"	29	2	42	1	5	Jury B Qualifier
5	Frédéric François	"Comme tous les amoureux"	3	5	Unknown	Unknown	3	—N/a
6	Serge Davignac	"Monsieur le printemps"	2	6	Unknown	Unknown	4	—N/a

===== Final =====
Serge & Christine Ghisoland and Andrée Simons, who had each qualified two songs for the final, both decided in advance to withdraw one of their songs ("Nous serons toi et moi" and "Perle d'étoile" respectively) in order not to risk splitting their vote, leaving only four songs in the final. The winning song was chosen by a combination of two juries: Jury A consisted of 600 TV viewers from 6 cities who were gathered in Dinant, and Jury B consisted of one jury from each of the other eleven participating countries in Eurovision 1970 and several journalists.

Final - 01.04.70 - 3 February 1970
R/O	Artist	Song	Jury A	Jury B	Total	Place
1	Andrée Simons	"La belle époque"	126	250	376	3
2	Serge & Christine Ghisoland	"Laï laï laï"	270	0	270	4
3	Johnny White	"Quand on est amoureux"	357	167	524	2
4	Jean Vallée	"Viens l'oublier"	230	583	813	1

== At Eurovision ==
On the night of the final Vallée performed 5th in the running order, following Yugoslavia and preceding France. At the close of voting "Viens l'oublier" had received 5 points (3 from France and 1 apiece from Ireland and Luxembourg), placing Belgium joint 8th (with Italy and Monaco) of the 12 entries. The Belgian jury awarded 9 of its 10 points to contest winners Ireland, the highest ever mark given by one country to another under the 10-points-per-jury system.

=== Voting ===
Points awarded to Belgium
Score	Country
3 points	France
1 point	Ireland; Luxembourg

Points awarded by Belgium
Score	Country
9 points	Ireland
1 point	Monaco
