= Frédéric François =

Italian-Belgian singer and composer (born 1950)

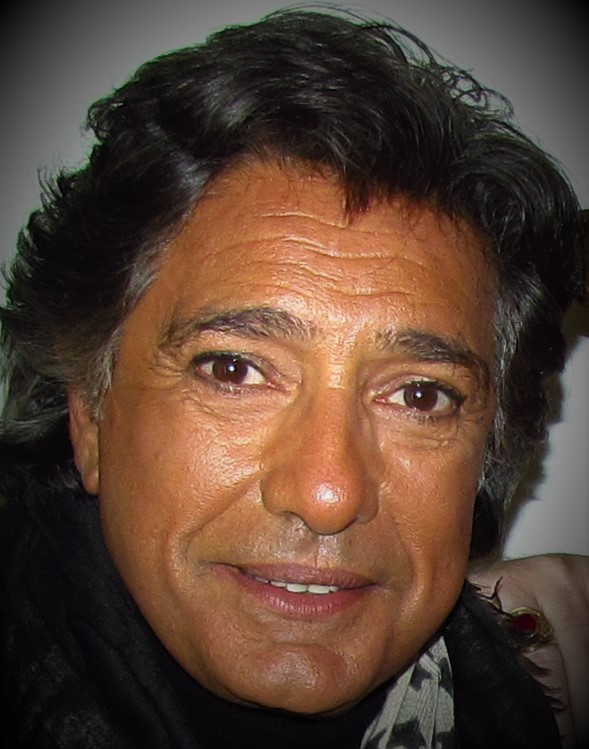
- Frédéric François in 2012

Background information
- Born: Francesco Barracato; 3 June 1950 (age 76); Lercara Friddi, Sicily, Italy
- Genre: Chanson
- Occupations: Singer; composer
- Years active: 1966–present
- Labels: Polydor; Barclay; AZ; Tréma; Vogue; BMG; MBM/Sony BMG
- Website: www.fredericfrancois.com

Frédéric François (born Francesco Barracato, 3 June 1950) is an Italian-Belgian French-speaking singer and composer.

== Biography ==
=== Origins and childhood ===
Born on 3 June 1950 in Lercara Friddi in Sicily, in a very modest Italian family, he is the second child of Antonina "Nina" Salemi and Giuseppe "Peppino" Barracato. His mother was a seamstress in Lercara and his father was initially a miner in a sulphur mine in Lercara. He emigrated to Belgium in the coal basin of Liège, where he signed a three-year contract as a miner. (Note: Term of the contract that entitled him to bring his family.) In 1951, Nina and her two sons joined Giuseppe in Tilleur (Note: Tilleur is 8 km from Liège.) in a Red Cross Convoy. Francesco Barracato grew up in a family of eight children. Peppino used to sing Neapolitan songs and opera arias for pleasure and accompanied himself on the guitar. Young Francesco was only 10 when he sang 'O sole mio for the first time in public in a café frequented mostly by Sicilians in Tilleur, "Le Passage à Niveau" [The Level Crossing].

=== Early days ===
In 1963, he turned semi-professional as a singer-guitarist in a group called "Les Eperviers" [The Sparrow hawks]. He left the technical college in 1965 for the Liège conservatoire to study violin, where he took courses particularly in diction, declamation and voice.

In 1966, he joined a new group called "Les Tigres Sauvages" [Wild Tigers] and won the "Microsillon d'Argent" [Silver Microgroove Record] at the Festival of Châtelet in Belgium – a prize that included the recording of a single. He recorded two titles: “Petite fille” [Little Girl] and "”Ne pleure pas" [Don't cry], under the pseudonym of François Bara. His father bought the 500 records that were pressed and managed to sell them for jukeboxes. The winner also got to perform as a warm-up act for three confirmed artists: Johnny Hallyday, Pascal Danel and Michel Polnareff, his idol.

In 1969, his meeting with the Belgian producer Constant Defourny led to his first contract with a record company: Barclay-Belgique. He recorded “Sylvie” in July 1969, and released his first single under the name of Frédéric François, in homage to the composer Chopin, whose real first name was Frédéric-François. He gave his first performances as a solo artist in venues in the Liège region during the tour of The Best Group orchestra: he performed five of his own compositions, including Sylvie, of course. (Note: Sylvie is the first name of the lyricist’s daughter.) He released a new single, “Les Orgues de Saint Michel” [The Organ of Saint Michael], which was not at all successful, then another one, "Marian," accompanied by a second title "Comme tous les amoureux," [Like all people in love], which was written especially to represent Belgium at the Eurovision Song Contest 1970, but was not selected.

=== 1970s ===
In 1970, Frédéric François recorded a new title "Jean", (Note: Jean is pronounced as in English.) an adaptation of the song in the British film The Prime of Miss Jean Brodie (Note: The Prime of Miss Jean Brodie) by Ronald Neame (1969). Distributed on the AZ label, this song crossed the Franco-Belgian border, thanks to Lucien Morisse, the programming director of Europe 1, who played it on his channel and enabled the young singer to have a number one single on the hit parade for the first time, though it was not enough to make him famous. He subsequently released two singles "Le pays d'où tu viens" [The Country you come from] and "Shabala": the first was broadcast on the Formule J programme of the Belgian radio corporation, the RTB. The fan base begins to grow.

In 1970, he married Monique Vercauteren, a miner's daughter, whom he had met a year earlier. He recorded a new song, this time spoken and not sung, "I love you je t'aime" as a duet with Monique. Their first child, Gloria, was born on 13 February 1971. "I love you, je t'aime" was played often on the Dutch pirate station Radio Veronica, which broadcast from a boat anchored outside territorial waters. The 30,000 sold copies of this record are to be considered as the first real recognition on the part of the public. But Monique continued with her factory job; Frédéric was not earning much from his music and experienced a certain discouragement when he composed "Comme on jette une bouteille à la mer" [Like a bottle thrown in the sea] and "Je n'ai jamais aimé comme je t'aime" [I have never loved the way I love you], with lyrics by Marino Atria. (Note: Sicilian by his mother, Neapolitan by his father and a miner's son himself.)

Having stayed at the no. 1 spot of the Formule J hit parade for thirteen weeks, Frédéric François emerged from anonymity, which made his new label, Vogue-Belgique, decide to distribute "Je n'ai jamais aimé comme je t'aime," prudently only in French record shops in Pas-de-Calais, a region next to Belgium: 250,000 copies were sold. He considers this sixth single, recorded under the name of Frédéric François, as his first real hit.

His second child, Vincent, was born a few months later, on 15 May 1972. The real hit was to come in the summer of that year: “Je voudrais dormir près de toi” [I would like to sleep near you], which sold 500,000 copies and went to number one in several countries.

As hit followed hit, ("Laisse-moi vivre ma vie" [Let me live my life] (end of 1972– one million records sold), "Viens te perdre dans mes bras" [Come and lose yourself in my arms] (1973), "Chicago" (1975), tour would follow tour. That is when his second son and third child, Anthony, was born, on 8 January 1976. Frédéric François is classified among the "romantic crooners for young girls", (Note: The term "romantic crooners for young girls" was not pejorative at the time.) (like Patrick Juvet, Christian Delagrange, Dave, Mike Brant). He could capitalise on his success until 1979, when the arrival of disco would dislodge him from the top of the pops.

=== 1980s ===
The crossing of the wilderness would last three years, until 1982. This low ebb took its toll with psychosomatic effects: he suffered serious attacks of spasmophilia which would become less frequent only when he started having hits again, thanks to the arrival of private radio and frequent airplay of “Adios Amor” [Goodbye love] at every turn – an adaptation by the lyricist Michel Jourdan of a German song by Andy Borg. The single sold 500,000 copies in a few weeks, followed by "Aimer" [Love] (adaptation M.Jourdan/Andy Borg) in 1983. This return to grace enabled him to go on tour again, which would take him to Haiti where he performed for the first time.

In 1984, he signed with Trema, the record company of Michel Sardou and Enrico Macias. Up until then, Frédéric François had sold mainly singles, in spite of thirteen LPs at Vogue. He released a new album "Mon cœur te dit je t'aime" [My heart tells you that I love you], which went three times gold.

The creation of the French Top 50 chart that same year would prove a decisive turning point in his career, since for the first time in recording history, singers were ranked according to their actual sales and not on subjective criteria. And yet, showbiz circles in Paris were still reticent. He was 34 years old when he performed at the Olympia for the first time, thanks to his impresario, Moïse Benitah, who managed to convince Jean-Michel Boris and Paulette Coquatrix. The show was sold out. And the craze for his new song "Je t'aime à l'italienne" [I love you, Italian style] was such that his name would be in lights once again the following year (1985) on the great music hall on the right bank, while his first book Les yeux charbon [Coal Eyes] (Carrère-Lafon) was a homage to his family and his public.

On 14 April 1987, his father Peppino Barracato died. The success of his new album "Une nuit ne suffit pas" [One night is not enough] (first joint effort with a female lyricist, Michaele) and the preparation of his third Olympia show in 1988, helped him to overcome this shock.

In 1989, he sang in twenty-five cities in Canada, as well as in the United States (April 1989) in Miami and in New York, where he gave five performances in three different venues: Brooklyn College and Queen's College at the CUNY, and the Town Hall Foundation.

=== 1990s ===
For three weeks, from 1 to 18 March 1990, Frédéric François performed at the Olympia. The first evening, as he went off stage, he was told that his fourth child, Victoria, had been born while he was performing the last song of his show, "Je t'aime à l'italienne." Two years later, he would perform on that fabled stage for an entire month – the longest run in his career.

In 1993, he left Trema to create his own production company, MBM, in order to gain complete creative freedom, and signed a contract with BMG for the distribution. He released the last vinyl single of his career, "L'amour c'est la musique" [Life is music]. Then came his first CD entitled "Tzigane" [Gypsy] (as well as a first excerpt from the same single title in Belgium).

On 20 December 1996, he was received in a private audience by Pope John Paul II in Rome, with other distinguished guests. (Note: Dionne Warwick, Natalie Cole, Laura Pausini and Los del Rio) On that occasion, he sang for the first time in his life before the Pope, accompanied by 70 musicians and the choruses of the Rome opera.

His mother, whom he always admired, died on 17 August 1997. Frédéric François dedicated to her his eighth appearance at the Olympia in March 1998, followed by a tour that attracted more than 300,000 spectators. He knew that he was going to sing for the first time in his life in his native village of Lercara Friddi in Sicily on 30 May 1999. A few months before that event, he recorded an album of Italian classics ("Volare", "Come Prima", "Ciao Ciao Bambina") entitled "Les plus grandes mélodies italiennes" [The Greatest Italian Melodies]. He also introduced a family song known to many Sicilians "La porta abanidduzza" [The door ajar], and for the first time in his career, he sang in the Sicilian language. He considered it as a return to his roots and a way to celebrate thirty years of success.

In 1999, the Editions LCJ Productions released a VHS of the film "Les dédales d'Icare" [The maze of Icarus] Armand Rocour (1981 Belgium); the song of the film Je voyage [I am travelling], was performed by Frédéric François who was playing his first role in a film.

=== 2000s ===
Frédéric François entered the 21st century by publishing his second book, Ma vie [My life] (Editions Hors Collection) with the journalist Serge Igor, where he talks about his life as never before, and opens his personal photo archives for the first time.

His tour in 2002–2003 featured more than 100 consecutive performances in France, Belgium and Switzerland. He decided to pay homage to Tino Rossi by covering his biggest hits in 2003: Méditerranée, Marinella, Ave Maria, Petit Papa Noël.

In 2004, during his eleventh appearance at the Olympia, he sang in English for the first time in his career, Elvis Presley's song, "Love Me Tender", to a standing ovation. In 2005, after three years without any recordings, he released a CD with 15 songs, including "Et si on parlait d'amour" [And if we spoke of love]. It sold 200,000 copies in a few weeks.

In October 2005, he published his third book, "Autobiographie d'un Sicilien" [Autobiography of a Sicilian] (Editions Ramsay), where he presents his values and ideals. That year, some of his lady admirers would give him another nickname than the famous "Frédo," by calling him "La voix de l'amour" [The voice of love].

Frédéric François said "Merci la vie!" [Thank you life] twice in a year's time: The first time on 22 October 2007, with his CD entitled, literally, “Merci la vie!” [Thank you life], and the second time on 22 October 2008 with the publication of the book with photos devoted to him, with more than 300 shots by Patrick Carpentier, "Merci la vie !" (Editions Du Rocher). Nevertheless, he fell ill on 26 October 2008 a little before his concert at the Forum of Liège, overcome by an excessive dose of cortisone. He was hospitalised twice at the Liège Academic Medical Center. He stayed there for nearly a month the first time, from 28 November to 22 December 2008, and fifteen days the second time in February 2009. Whilst on his hospital bed, the live album then the DVD version of the Frédéric François tour from the Olympia to Forest National were released, which mixed recordings of his performances on stage in Paris and in Brussels.

The doctors recommended complete rest. He put his career on hold for a year. He would sing again in public, exceptionally, during the Télévie programme on the Belgian RTL-TVI channel for cancer research. He is seen performing "Somethin' Stupid" with his daughter Victoria, a duet created together in March 2008 on the Olympia stage on his daughter's eighteenth birthday. He resumed his activities on 31 October 2009 by resuming his tour where he had left of: on the stage of the Forum in Liège.

=== 2010s ===
In 2010, he released a new album, “Chanteur d’amour” [Singer of love], followed by an object book "Une vie d'amour" [A life of love], and appeared at the Olympia from 11 to 20 February 2011, then at Forest National on 5 March 2011 [reference necessary]. He released a CD entitled "40 Succès en or" [40 golden hits] included in a DVD.

After a year on tour, on 3 and 4 March 2012, he returned to the Olympia, with his friends Liane Foly and Roberto Alagna as guests.

He also appeared in the "Vivement Dimanche" programme on France 2 on 20 October 2013, to promote his new album "Amor Latino" [Latin Love] (which was released on 21 October 2013), and he sang "Qu'as-tu fait da moi" [What have you done to me] and "Amor Latino", on that programme.

After that show, Michel Drucker said that he had attracted the season's biggest audience thanks to Frédéric François. The "Amor Latino" album was a new development in the "Frédéric François" style: a real “musical blend” came into being, with the creation of new musical styles: classic-pop, rock-tango, r&b – tango, electro-swing, etc.

He celebrated his 14th run at the Olympia from 28 February to 9 March 2014, then went on tour until 2015. On 18 August 2014, he released a “Best of” collection of 3 CDs and on 20 October, the CD “30 ans d’Olympia- Live 2014” [Thirty years of Olympia – Live 2014] was released.

In December 2014, his daughter, Victoria Barracato, produced his new clip: Fidèle. For the end-of-year holidays, Frédéric François released an album “Magie de Noël” [Magic of Christmas], which included the standard Christmas songs, several universal songs and one original work: “Avant Noël” [Before Christmas].

== Career ==
Whilst he was celebrating 40 years in show business, François was giving sold out concerts, his record sales have exceeded 35 million copies, ranking him number three in number of records sold among singers with Belgian nationality, behind Salvatore Adamo and Jacques Brel. He has had 85 gold records, singles and albums together, 15 gold awards for his sales of videos and DVDs. He has sung 350 songs in four languages.

== Main hits ==
- 1971 : Je n'ai jamais aimé comme je t'aime, Vogue
- 1972 : Je voudrais dormir près de toi, Vogue
- 1972 : Laisse-moi vivre ma vie, Vogue
- 1973 : Quand vient le soir on se retrouve, Vogue
- 1973 : Un chant d'amour un chant d'été, Vogue
- 1973 : Viens te perdre dans mes bras, Vogue
- 1973 : Pour toi, Vogue
- 1974 : Il est déjà trop tard / Viens me retrouver
- 1974 : Si je te demande Vogue
- 1975 : Chicago, Vogue
- 1984 : On s'embrasse, on oublie tout, Vogue
- 1984 : Mon cœur te dit je t'aime, Trema
- 1985 : Je t'aime à l'italienne, Trema
- 1987 : Une nuit ne suffit pas, Trema
- 1988 : L'amour s'en va l'amour revient, Trema
- 1989 : Qui de nous deux, Trema
- 1990 : Est-ce que tu es seule ce soir, Trema
- 1993 : Tzigane, MBM-BMG
- 1995 : Les Italos-Américains, MBM-BMG
- 1997 : L'amour fou, MBM-BMG
- 1997 : Je ne t'oublie pas, MBM-BMG
- 2001 : Un slow pour s'aimer, MBM-BMG
- 2005 : Et si l'on parlait d'amour, MBM-BMG
- 2007 : Merci la vie, MBM-Sony/BMG
- 2010 : Chanteur d'amour, MBM-Sony/BMG
- 2013 : Amor Latino, MBM-Sony/BMG

== Discography ==
=== Singles ===
- 1966 : Petite fille, Polydor
- 1969 : Sylvie, Barclay
- 1970 : La nuit n'a pas de couleur, Barclay
- 1970 : Marian, Barclay
- 1970 : Triste Matin, Barclay
- 1970 : Mini maxi Dolly, Barclay
- 1971 : Jean, AZ
- 1971 : Mini maxi Dolly, AZ
- 1971 : Shabala, AZ
- 1971 : I love you, je t'aime, AZ
- 1971 : I love you je t'aime (+suis je né pour pleurer), London-Canada
- 1971 : I love you je t'aime, Ekipo-Espagne
- 1971 : I love you, je t'aime, Vogue-Belgique
- 1971 : I love you ti amo, Rare-Italie
- 1971 : Shabala, Vogue-Belgique
- 1971 : Je n'ai jamais aimé comme je t'aime, Vogue
- 1971 : Ma chance c'est de t'avoir, Vogue-Belgique
- 1972 : Amare e' avere te (Ma chance c'est de t'avoir), CBS-Sugar-Vogue
- 1972 : Ma chance c'est de t'avoir, Ekipo-Espagne
- 1972 : Ma vie c'est toi, Vogue
- 1972 : Shabala, Ekipo-Espagne
- 1972 : Je voudrais dormir près de toi, Vogue
- 1972 : Je voudrais dormir près de toi, Vogue-Japon
- 1972 : Laisse-moi vivre ma vie, Vogue
- 1972 : Laisse-moi vivre ma vie, Vogue-Portugal
- 1972 : Laisse-moi vivre ma vie, Vogue-Japon
- 1973 : Quand vient le soir on se retrouve, Vogue
- 1973 : Quand vient le soir on se retrouve, Vogue-Portugal
- 1973 : Pour toi, Vogue
- 1973 : Un chant d'amour, un chant d'été, Vogue
- 1973 : Un chant d'amour, un chant d'été, Vogue-Japon
- 1973 : Tu non-sei piu' come una volta (laisse moi vivre ma vie), Vogue-Italie
- 1973 : Viens te perdre dans mes bras, Vogue
- 1973 : Viens te perdre dans mes bras, Vogue-Portugal
- 1974 : N'oublie jamais (+ Si je te demande) Vogue
- 1974 : N'oublie jamais (+ Tu veux rester libre) Alvaroda-Portugal
- 1974 : Il est déjà trop tard, Vogue
- 1974 : Tant que je vivrai, Vogue
- 1975 : Mal tu me fais mal, Vogue
- 1975 : Maintenant que tu es loin de moi, Vogue
- 1975 : Chicago (+ Comment veux-tu que je t'oublie), Vogue
- 1975 : C'est Noël (+ C'est Noël avec la chorale), Vogue-Belgique
- 1975 : Tu veux rester libre (+ c'est noël sur la terre), Vogue-Toho records-Japon
- 1975 : Chicago (+ C'est ma faute), Ariola-Allemagne
- 1976 : Baby dollar, Vogue
- 1976 : Fanny Fanny, Vogue
- 1976 : Baby dollar (+ Fanny Fanny), Ariola-Allemagne
- 1976 : San Francisco, Vogue
- 1976 : San Francisco, Vogue-Japon
- 1976 : C'est Noël (+ C'est ma faute), Vogue
- 1977 : On comprend toujours quand c'est trop tard, Vogue
- 1977 : De Venise à Capri, Vogue
- 1977 : De Venise à Capri, Ariola-Allemagne
- 1977 : Belle, tu es belle (+ Valentino), Vogue
- 1977 : Belle, tu es belle (+ Valentino), Ariola-Allemagne
- 1978 : Sois romantique, Vogue
- 1978 : Au dancing de mon cœur, Vogue
- 1978 : Giorgia, Vogue
- 1979 Un amour d'aujourd'hui, Vogue
- 1979 : Via Italia (+ Seul), Vogue
- 1980 : Via Italia (+ N'oublie jamais nous deux), Vogue
- 1980 : Qui t'a dit qu'en ce temps là, Vogue
- 1980 : Je rêve sur mon piano, Vogue
- 1980 : Je rêve sur mon piano, Vogue-Belgique
- 1981 : Je veux chanter la nostalgie, Vogue
- 1981 : Douce Douce, Vogue
- 1982 : J'aimerai te faire du bien ( + Le p'tit yellow submarine), promo Vogue-Modulation-Canada
- 1982 : Un homme dans ta vie (+ Lisa donna Lisa), promo Vogue-Modulation-Canada
- 1982 : On s'aimera toute la vie (duo avec Gloria), Vogue
- 1982 : Adios amor (+ Nous étions des amis), Vogue
- 1982 : Adios amor (+ I love you, je t'aime, en espagnol) Vogue
- 1982 : Je n'ai jamais aimé comme je t'aime, Ekipo-Espagne
- 1982 : Tu veux rester libre, Vogue-Japon
- 1983 : Aimer, Vogue
- 1984 : On s'embrasse, on oublie tout, Tréma
- 1984 : Mon cœur te dit je t'aime, Trema
- 1985 : Une femme pour toute la vie, Trema
- 1985 : Je t'aime à l'italienne, Trema
- 1986 : Quand papa chantait, Trema
- 1986 : L'aimer encore, Trema
- 1987 : Nina Ninouschka, Trema
- 1987 : Une nuit ne suffit pas, Trema
- 1988 : Çà commence comme une histoire d'amour (+ Un garçon pleure), Trema-Trans-Canada
- 1988 : L'amour s'en va l'amour revient, Trema
- 1989 : Une simple histoire d'amour, Trema
- 1989 : Qui de nous deux, Trema
- 1990 : C'est toi qui pars, Trema
- 1990 : Est-ce que tu es seule ce soir, Trema
- 1991 : Je me battrai pour elle, Trema
- 1992 : Je ne te suffis pas, Trema
- 1992 : Bleu méditerranée, Trema
- 1992 : Encore une nuit sans toi, Trema
- 1993 : L'amour c'est la musique, MBM-BMG
- 1993 : Tzigane, MBM-BMG-ARIOLA Belgique

=== Laser singles ===
- 1990 : Est ce que tu es seule ce soir, TREMA-Pathé Marconi
- 1991 : Je me battrai pour elle, TREMA-Pathé Marconi
- 1992 : Je ne te suffis pas, TREMA-Sony music
- 1992 : Bleu méditerranée, TREMA-Sony music
- 1992 : Encore une nuit sans toi, TREMA-Sony music
- 1993 : L'amour c'est la musique, MBM-BMG
- 1993 : Tzigane, MBM-BMG
- 1993 : Si tu t'en vas, MBM-BMG
- 1994 : Fou d'elle (Live Olympia 94), MBM-BMG
- 1995 : Les Italo-Américains, MBM-BMG
- 1995 : En plein soleil, MBM-BMG
- 1995 : Y a-t-il quelqu'un ?, MBM-BMG
- 1995 : O Sole mio, MBM-BMG
- 1996 : Funiculi Funicula (promo), MBM-BMG
- 1996 : Luna Rossa (promo live Olympia 96), MBM-BMG
- 1997 : L'amour fou, MBM-BMG
- 1997 : Je ne t'oublie pas, MBM-BMG
- 1997 : Chiquita, MBM-BMG
- 1997 : Le jardin de mr Paul, MBM-BMG
- 1998 : Je veux tout, MBM-BMG
- 1999 : Volare, MBM-BMG
- 2001 : Mourir d'amour (promo live Olympia 2000), MBM-BMG
- 2001 : Un slow pour s'aimer, MBM-BMG-Une Musique
- 2002 : Ensemble on gagnera, MBM-BMG-Une Musique
- 2002 : Tant qu'il y aura des femmes, MBM-BMG
- 2002 : Petite maman (édition bonus), MBM-BMG-Une Musique
- 2003 : Méditerranée/Quand Tino chantait, MBM-BMG
- 2003 : Paix sur la terre (versions studio/live), MBM-BMG
- 2005 : Et si on parlait d'amour (promo), BMG Media
- 2005 : Tu sais bien, MBM-Sony-BMG
- 2007 : Une rose dans le désert, MBM-BMG-Sony-Columbia-Vogue
- 2007 : L'amour c'est comme le tango, MBM-BMG-Sony-Columbia-Vogue
- 2008 : Somethin' stupid (promo live tour 2008), MBM-Sony-BMG
- 2009 : Somethin' stupid + clip (live tour 2008), MBM-Sony Music
- 2010 : C'est plus fort que moi /Chanteur d'amour /Ils font un rêve, MBM-Sony Music
- 2011 : La Tarentelle d'amour (promo tour 2011), MBM-Sony Music
- 2012 : Je n'ai pas fini de t'aimer, MBM-Sony Music
- 2013 : Amor latino /Qu'as tu fait de moi/Ok pour t'emmener, MBM-Sony Music

=== 33-tours ===
- 1971 : I love you, je t'aime, Vogue
- 1971 : I love you, je t'aime, London-Canada
- 1972 : Je voudrais dormir près de toi, Vogue
- 1972 : Je voudrais dormir près de toi, Vogue-Belgique
- 1972 : Je voudrais dormir près de toi, Vogue-Espagne
- 1972 : Je voudrais dormir près de toi, Vogue-Argentine
- 1973 : Laisse-moi vivre ma vie, Vogue
- 1973 : Viens te perdre dans mes bras, Vogue
- 1973 : Ma vie en musique (version instrumentale, vol 1), Vogue
- 1973 : 12 premiers succès de Frédéric François, Vogue-Japon
- 1974 : Tant que je vivrai, Vogue
- 1974 : Tant que je vivrai, Vogue-Japon
- 1974 : Viens te perdre dans mes bras, Vogue-Japon
- 1975 : Chicago, Vogue
- 1976 : San Francisco, Vogue
- 1976 : Ma vie en musique, Vogue-Argentine
- 1977 : Belle tu es belle, Vogue
- 1977 : Laisse-moi vivre ma vie, Vogue-Japon
- 1978 : Giorgia, Vogue
- 1979 : Giorgia, Vogue-Argentine
- 1980 : Qui t'a dit qu'en ce temps là, Vogue
- 1981 : Je veux chanter la nostalgie, Vogue
- 1981 : Un chant d'amour un chant d'été, Vogue-Japon
- 1982 : Adios amor, Vogue
- 1983 : Aimer, Vogue
- 1984 : Mon cœur te dit je t'aime, Trema
- 1985 : Je t'aime à l'italienne, Trema
- 1986 : L'aimer encore, Trema
- 1988 : Une nuit ne suffit pas, Trema
- 1988 : Live de l'Olympia, Trema
- 1989 : L'amour s'en va, l'amour revient, Trema
- 1990 : Qui de nous deux, Trema
- 1990 : Olympia 90, Trema
- 1991 : Est-ce que tu es seule ce soir, Trema
- 1992 : Je ne te suffis pas, Trema

=== Laser albums ===
- 1984 : Mon cœur te dit je t'aime, Trema
- 1985 : Je t'aime à l'italienne, Trema
- 1986 : L'aimer encore, Trema
- 1988 : Une nuit ne suffit pas, Trema
- 1988 : Live de l'Olympia, Trema
- 1989 : L'amour s'en va, l'amour revient, Trema
- 1990 : Qui de nous deux, Trema
- 1990 : Olympia 90, Trema
- 1991 : Est-ce que tu es seule ce soir, Trema
- 1992 : Je ne te suffis pas, Trema
- 1990 : Olympia 90, Trema
- 1991 : Est-ce que tu es seule ce soir, Trema
- 1992 : Je ne te suffis pas, Trema
- 1993 : Tzigane, MBM-BMG
- 1994 : Les chansons de mon cœur, MBM-BMG
- 1994 : Olympia 94, MBM-BMG
- 1995 : Les Italo-Américains, MBM-BMG
- 1995 : Les plus grandes chansons napolitaines, MBM-BMG
- 1996 : Album d'or, MBM-BMG
- 1996 : Olympia 96, MBM-BMG
- 1997 : Les chansons de mon cœur vol 2, MBM-BMG
- 1997 : Je ne t'oublie pas, MBM-BMG
- 1998 : Olympia 98, MBM-BMG
- 1998 : Best of de mes Olympia, MBM-BMG
- 1998 : Pour toi Maman édition spéciale 4 CD MBM-BMG
- 1999 : Les plus grandes mélodies italiennes, MBM-BMG
- 1999 : Frédéric François " Le collector ", MBM-BMG
- 2000 : Olympia 2000, MBM-BMG
- 2001 : Un slow pour s'aimer, MBM-BMG
- 2001 : 60 chansons 3 CD, MBM-BMG
- 2001 : L'essentiel, MBM-BMG
- 2002 : Frédéric François chante Noël, MBM-BMG
- 2003 : Olympia 2002 spectacle intégral, MBM-BMG
- 2003 : Les romances de toujours, MBM-BMG
- 2004 : 30 chansonsde légende, MBM-BMG
- 2004 : Un été d'amour, MBM-BMG
- 2005 : Bailamos, MBM/Sony-BMG
- 2005 : Et si l'on parlait d'amour, MBM/Sony-BMG
- 2005 : Olympia 2005, MBM/Sony-BMG
- 2006 : Les chansons mythiques des années 70, MBM/Sony-BMG
- 2006 : Les indispensables, MBM/Sony-BMG
- 2006 : Mes préférences, MBM/Sony-BMG
- 2007 : Pour toi maman 2007, MBM/Sony-BMG
- 2007 : Une vie d'amour, MBM/Sony-BMG
- 2007 : Merci la vie, MBM/Sony-BMG
- 2008 : 20 ans d'Olympia, MBM/Sony-BMG
- 2008 : Tour 2008 de l'Olympia à Forest National, MBM/Sony-BMG
- 2010 : Chanteur d'amour, MBM/Sony-BMG
- 2011 : 40 succès en or, MBM/Sony-BMG
- 2011 : Tour 2011-Le spectacle anniversaire, MBM/Sony-BMG
- 2012 : Je n'ai pas fini de t'aimer / Parler d'amour, MBM/Sony-BMG
- 2012 : Pour toi maman 2012, MBM/Sony-BMG
- 2012 : Album d'Or 2012, MBM/Sony-BMG
- 2012 : L'intégrale 1992 à 2012, MBM/Sony-BMG
- 2013 : Amor Latino, MBM/Sony-BMG
- 2014 : Best of – 3CD, MBM/Sony-BMG
- 2014 : 30 ans d'Olympia – Live 2014, MBM/Sony-BMG
- 2014 : La Magie de Noël, MBM/Sony-BMG
- 2015 : Fidèle, MBM/Sony-BMG*
- 2015 : 30 ans d'Olympia – Live 2014 – includes a DVD MBM/Sony-BMG

=== DVD ===
- 1990 : Forest National 1990 – Live 90
- 1994 : Spectacle au Canada – Live 94
- 1996 : 25 ans d'Amour – Olympia 1996
- 1998 : Olympia 1998 – Live 98
- 2000 : 2000 ans D'amour – Olympia 2000
- 2000 : La vidéo du Siècle
- 2001 : Karaoké
- 2003 : Olympia 2002 – Live 2002
- 2006 : Olympia 2005 – Live 2005
- 2006 : Olympia 2002, Olympia 2005 et Karaoké
- 2008 : Ma vidéo d'Or – 20 ans d'images coup de coeur
- 2009 : Tours 2008 de l'Olympia à Forest National – Live 2008
- 2009 : La vidéo d'Or de mes tendre années
- 2011 : Tours 2011 – Spectacle Anniversaire
- 2015 : 30 ans d'Olympia – Olympia 2014 (Prévue pour le 27 Avril 2915)

== Audiovisual ==
It was in the summer of 1969 that people heard Frédéric François sing on the radio for the first time: on the Belgian station RTBF. He performed "Sylvie." He was a guest on his first radio show a few weeks later on that same station.

In France, in 1970, it was Europe 1 that broadcast a song by Frédéric François for the first time, "Jean," which put him in the charts (of that station) for the first time. In the second half of 1971, "Je n'ai jamais aimé comme je t'aime" was played for the first time on the "Formule J" programme of the RTBF. This song stayed at number one for thirteen weeks. The French in the Nord-Pas-de-Calais, who listen often to radio stations transmitting from Belgium, could not find this single at their record shops, because it was not distributed in France, and crossed the border to buy it in Belgian record shops.

He participated in his first radio show in France in 1972 on Europe N°1, in "5, 6, 7" presented by Jacques Ourévitch, at the time that "Je voudrais dormir près de toi" came out. Michel Jonasz and Michel Berger were in the same studio, as they were embarking on their careers.

His first television show was broadcast in 1972, on the sole French station at the time, the ORTF. Presented by Guy Lux, it was transmitted live from the little white wine feast in Nogent-sur-Marne (Val-de-Marne). He was roosted on a float in the company of Mike Brant, and both of them were driven through all the streets of the city!

That same year, he appeared on the television program Midi-Première, presented by Danièle Gilbert and Jacques Martin, where he met musician Salvatore Adamo.

In 1973, the presenter Christian Morin on Europe N°1 was the first to use the diminutive "Frédo" to refer to him, during a programme called "Le hit parade" where he was invited to reward the millionth buyer of his single "Laisse-moi vivre ma vie."

In December 1974, he sang live on RTL. He was not in the major studio, but in the Church of Chesnay in the Yvelines, before two hundred children and their parents. The proceeds went to the handicapped children of Garches (Hauts-de-Seine) and to fatherless children of the "Le Nid de la ville d'Antony" [The Nest of Anthony's City] foundation. In the beginning of 1975, in the programme entitled "Samedi est à vous" [Saturday over to you] presented by Bernard Golay on the first station of the ORTF, he was tied, with Mike Brant, for first place, as the favourite singer of television viewers.

From 1975 to 1979, he appeared on "Ring-parade" on Antenne 2, presented by Guy Lux and Jean-Pierre Foucault.

Radio has been decisive in Frédéric François's career, because it was thanks to free radio stations that he tasted success, when they had just come into being, by playing "Adios Amor" extensively in 1982, which brought him out of three long years in the wilderness.

From 1983 to 1998, he was invited many times to the Jacques Martin's "École des Fans" [School of Fans] as part of the programme "Dimanche Martin" [Sunday Martin].

As of 1984, Pascal Sevran invited him regularly to appear in "La Chance aux Chansons" [Give songs a chance]. In 1995, he was the main guest of the show for an entire week, when his second album, "Les Italos-Américains" [Italian Americans] was released.

In 1988, he was on hand for the launch of a brand new show of the Belgian station RTL-TVI, "Télévie" [Telelife], which raised funds for leukaemia. He would make it a point of honour to participate every year down to the present day. In France, during a broadcast of Jean-Pierre Foucault's "Sacrée Soirée" [Hell of an evening] in 1988, his son Anthony surprised him by singing Chicago, accompanied by his sister Gloria (on guitar) and his brother Vincent (on piano).

On 17 December 1988, Patrick Sabatier devoted a broadcast of "Avis de Recherche" [Wanted] on TF1. He and his seven brothers and sisters are united for the first time in a television studio. His wife, Monique, has sung only once in public, during a "Sacrée Soirée" show for Valentine's Day, on 14 February 1991, when she joined him in a rendition of "Mon cœur te dit je t'aime.”

On 12 April 1991, "Tous à la Une" [All in the headlines] asked him to be its exceptional editor in chief on TF1. Frédéric Mitterrand devoted his "C'est notre vie" [It's our life] show on 17 June 1994, during which he met the actress who made him dream in his youth, Gina Lollobrigida. He improvised "Le Chaland" [The Barge] on the guitar, in Italian, because he knew it was one of her favourite songs, which served as a leitmotiv for several cult films in Italy.

In 1999, RTL-TVI and Marylène Bergmann devoted to him a special show recorded live at the Cirque Royal [Royal Circus] in Brussels. On 25 April 2009, he sponsored a new programme on the Belgian station RTL-TVI entitled "Au cœur de Télévie" [At the heart of Telelife] to get people to understand the scourge that is cancer through reports and interviews. On the same day, he was on stage at the same station, as every year, for "Télévie" for research on all forms of cancer. It was during this evening that he sang for the first time again, after having ceased all activities for six months.

In France, although he had not appeared in public since his concert on 17 October 2008 at Micropolis in Besançon, he wanted television viewers to see that he was doing well by making a surprise appearance on 14 May 2009 in Sophie Davant's show "C'est au programme" [It's on the programme] on France 2. On the radio, he broke his silence only once, at the request of Dave, who presented a revamped version of Top 50 the entire summer on Europe 1. The footage was broadcast on 17 August 2009.

In 2010, during Daniela Lumbroso's "Chabada" show, Frédéric François was surrounded by Salvatore Adamo and the tenor Roberto Alagna. None of the three singers stuck to the initial programme (they were to pay homage to Polnareff, Brassens and Luis Mariano respectively), and together, they created a "Sicilian" ambiance on stage, bringing their childhood memories musically back to life.

In 2011, during a special "Vivement Dimanche" [Ever on Sunday] show devoted to Italy, Michel Drucker invited Frédéric François, who joined Ornella Muti, Arturo Brachetti and "Les Prêtres" [The Priests] on stage. That same year, Stéphane Pauwels launched a new show on the Belgian RTL-TVI station: "Les orages de la vie" [The storms of life], the aim of which is to show that even the biggest stars have gone through stormy patches. He asked Frédéric François to be the first "subject" of his show, and took him back to Tilleur, the neighbourhood of his youth, in the house where his parents used to live when his first producer, Constant Defourny, came knocking on their door.

During the 2010s, Frédéric François was a regular guest on many shows such as Patrick Sébastien's "Les Années Bonheur" [Years of happiness], Humbert Ibach's "Les Grands du Rire" [The great comedians], presented by Yves Lecoq, or "Face à Face" [Face to Face] on RTL-TVI.

In the beginning of 2014, Frédéric was invited to Sophie Davant's "C'est au programme," during the course of which the writer Marc Lévy paid him a stirring tribute, as if he had written the exceptional destiny of little Francesco Barracato. Frédéric was very moved, to the point of wishing to include this video in his new tour, in a segment entitled "Hommage à mon père" [Homage to my father].

== Bibliography ==
- 1985 : Les yeux charbon (Editions Carrère-Lafon)
- 2000 : Ma Vie (Editions Hors Collection) (with Serge Igor).
- 2005 : Autobiographie d'un sicilien (Editions Ramsay).
- 2008 : Merci la vie ! (Editions du Rocher) (with the photographer Patrick Carpentier).
- 2011 : Une vie d'amour

== Decorations ==
- 1999 : Knight of Arts and Letters of the Order of Leopold II, from the hands of the Belgian Minister for Culture, Pierre Hazette. (Note: Récompenses 1998–2002 Awards 1998–2002 [archive] conferred by the Government of the Wallonia-Brussels Federation (French-speaking Community of Belgium))
- 2008 : Honorary citizen of the City of Wanze (Belgium)..
- 2009 : Commander of the Order of Merit of the Italian Republic (Commendatore dell'Ordine al Merito della Republica Italiana) from the hands of the Italian Consul in Liège, with the approval of the President of the Italian Council, Silvio Berlusconi. This distinction was conferred on him before 10,000 people in Blégny-Mine, the only mine museum in Belgium. He is the first Italian artist with an immigrant background to receive this honour.
- 2011 : Ambassador of the Province of Liège
- 2012 : Handing over of the keys of his native town, Lercara Friddi, Province of Palermo – Sicily. (equivalent to an honorary citizen)
- 2013 : 2013: Crystal Heart conferred by the Belgian Prime Minister Elio Di Rupo.
