= Ireland in the Eurovision Song Contest 1970 =

- Eurovision Song Contest 1970
- Participating broadcaster: Radio Telefís Éireann (RTÉ)
- Country: Ireland
- Selection process: National Song Contest
- Selection date: 1 March 1970

Competing entry
- Song: "All Kinds of Everything"
- Artist: Dana
- Songwriters: Derry Lindsay; Jackie Smith

Placement
- Final result: 1st, 32 points

Participation chronology

Ireland was represented at the Eurovision Song Contest 1970 with the song "All Kinds of Everything", written by Derry Lindsay and Jackie Smith, and performed by Dana. The Irish participating broadcaster, Radio Telefís Éireann (RTÉ), selected its entry through a national final. The entry eventually won the Eurovision Song Contest.

== Before Eurovision ==
=== National Song Contest ===
The sixth National Song Contest was due to be held on 8 February 1970 but was postponed until Sunday 1 March 1970 because of a technicians' strike at Radio Telefís Éireann (RTÉ). The deadline for countries to submit entries to the EBU for the Eurovision Song Contest 1970 was 23 February 1970, but RTÉ were given a three week extension. Eight entries were chosen out of 397 submissions received by RTÉ. It was broadcast live from the RTÉ studios in Dublin on RTÉ and RTÉ Radio, hosted by Brendan O'Reilly. The winning song was decided by 10 regional juries, each consisting of six members, throughout Ireland.

Dana had previously participated in the Irish national final in 1969, and finished in second place. Both Anna McGoldrick and Tony Kenny had sung in the national contest in 1968.

R/O	Artist	Song	Songwriter(s)	Points	Place
1	Pat and Jean	"Cé'n Fáth Ná Gráíonn Tú Mé?" ("Why Don't You Love Me?")	Mary Walsh	0	8
2	Tony O'Leary	"She Meant Everything"	Joseph Monks	2	6
3	Anna McGoldrick	"Dá Sheolfainn an Domhan" ("If I Could Launch the World")	Frank Talbot; Pat O'Brien	2	6
4	We 4	"D'Imigh an Ghrian" ("The Sun Has Gone")	Michael Judge	5	4
5	John McNally	"An Irish Love"	Jack Brierley; George Crosbie	9	3
6	Dana	"All Kinds of Everything"	Derry Lindsay; Jackie Smith	23	1
7	Maxi, Dick and Twink	"Things You Hear About Me"	Jim Doherty; Des Smyth	14	2
8	Tony Kenny	"No Time Like Summertime"	John G. Fahey; Seamus McHugh	5	4

Detailed Regional Jury Votes
R/O	Song	Sligo	Kilkenny	Cavan	Castlebar	Limerick	Cork	Wexford	Galway	Dublin	Athlone	Total
1	"Cé'n Fáth Ná Gráíonn Tú Mé?"											0
2	"She Meant Everything"		1						1			2
3	"Dá Sheolfainn an Domhan"			2								2
4	"D'Imigh an Ghrian"			1				3	1			5
5	"An Irish Love"	3	1			1			1	3		9
6	"All Kinds of Everything"	3	4	2	4	1	1	2	3		3	23
7	"Things You Hear About Me"			1	1	3	5	1		3		14
8	"No Time Like Summertime"				1	1					3	5

== At Eurovision ==
=== Voting ===
Valerie McGovern commentated on RTÉ Television, and Kevin Roche on RTÉ Radio. RTÉ appointed John Skehan as its spokesperson to announce the Irish jury vote in the contest.

Every participating broadcaster assembled a jury panel of ten people. Every jury member could give one point to their favourite song.

Points awarded to Ireland
Score	Country
9 points	Belgium
6 points	Switzerland
5 points	Netherlands
4 points	United Kingdom
3 points	Spain
2 points	Germany; Luxembourg
1 point	France

Points awarded by Ireland
Score	Country
3 points	France; United Kingdom
2 points	Germany
1 point	Belgium; Switzerland
