= OTI Festival 1976 =

5th OTI Song Festival

Date and venue
- Final: 30 October 1976
- Venue: Teatro Juan Ruiz de Alarcón; Centro de Convenciones; Acapulco, Mexico

Organization
- Organizer: Organización de Televisión Iberoamericana (OTI)
- Host broadcaster: Televisa
- Musical director: Jesús Rodriguez de Hijar
- Presenters: Raúl Velasco; Susana Dosamantes

Participants
- Number of entries: 19
- Debuting countries: Costa Rica
- Returning countries: Honduras
- Non-returning countries: Bolivia; Dominican Republic
- Participation map: Participating countries Countries that participated in the past but not in 1976

Vote
- Voting system: Each country had 5 jurors and each of them voted for their favourite entry.
- Winning song: Spain "Canta cigarra"

The OTI Festival 1976 (Spanish: Quinto Gran Premio de la Canción Iberoamericana, Portuguese: Quinto Grande Prêmio da Canção Ibero-Americana) was the fifth edition of the OTI Festival, held on 30 October 1976 at the Teatro Juan Ruiz de Alarcón of the Centro de Convenciones in Acapulco, Mexico, and presented by Raúl Velasco and Susana Dosamantes. It was organised by the Organización de Televisión Iberoamericana (OTI) and host broadcaster Televisa, who staged the event after winning the 1975 festival for Mexico with the song "La felicidad" by Gualberto Castro. Velasco had previously presented the 1974 festival at the same venue.

Broadcasters from nineteen countries participated in the festival, the same number of participants as the two previous years. The winner was the song "Canta cigarra" written and performed by María Ostiz representing Spain; with "Soy", written by Marlene O'Brien, Kenny O'Brien, and Víctor Daniel, and performed by Las Cuatro Monedas representing Venezuela, placing second; and "Era sólo un chiquillo", written by José Alfredo Fuentes and Óscar Cáceres, and performed by Fuentes himself representing Chile, placing third.

== Location ==
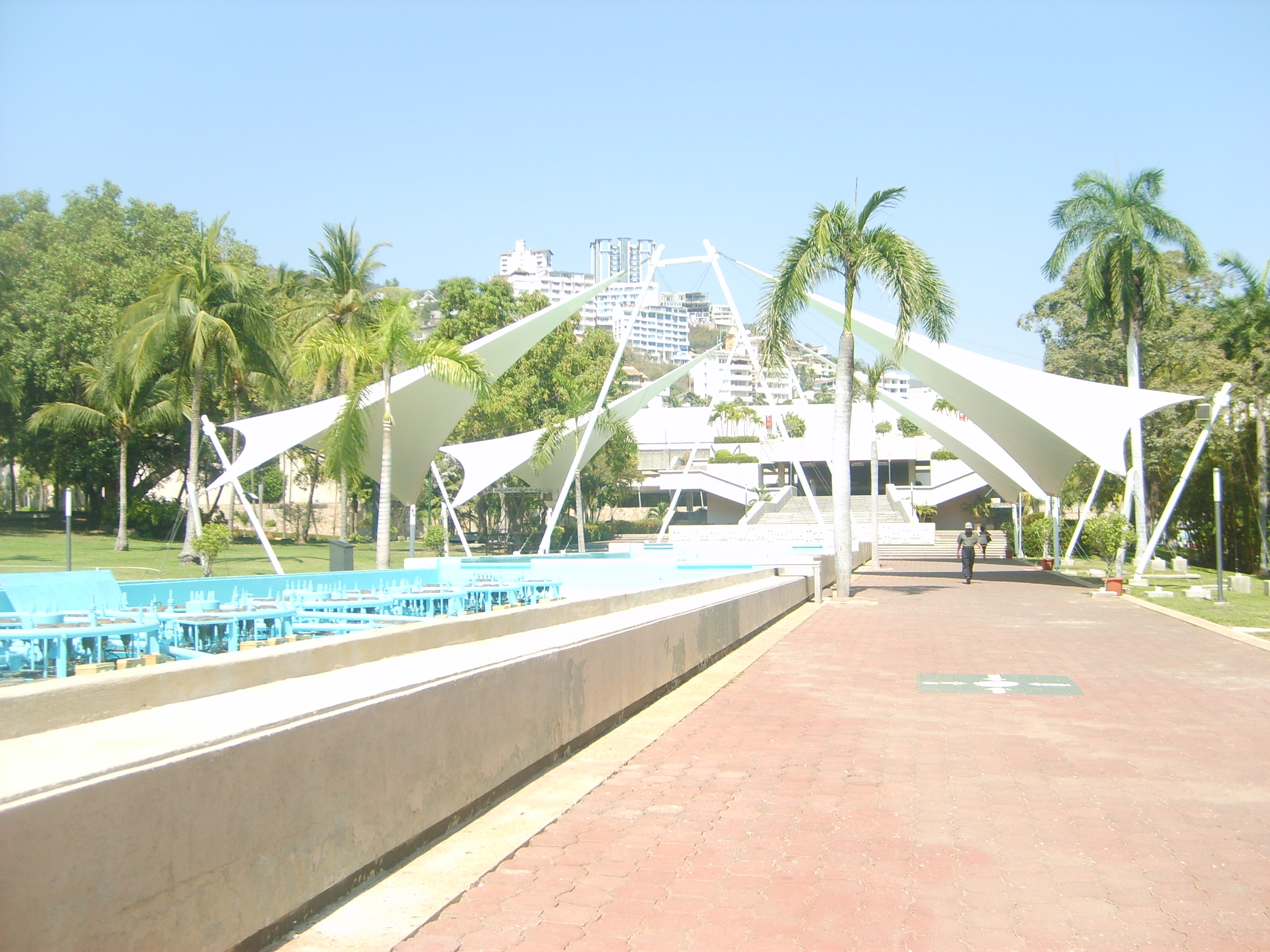
Centro de Convenciones, Acapulco – host venue of the OTI Festival 1976.

According to the rules of the OTI Festival at the time, the winning broadcaster of the previous edition would host the festival the following year. The Organización de Televisión Iberoamericana (OTI) designated Televisa, which was the winning broadcaster of the previous edition with the song "La felicidad" by Gualberto Castro for Mexico, as the host broadcaster of the 1976 edition.

Televisa had hosted the 1974 festival in Acapulco. For 1976, Mexico City was proposed as the host city due to its good infrastructure to host international events, but the broadcaster opted again for Acapulco due to the municipality's prestigious reputation as a tourist centre both for mass tourism and for convention and congress purposes. The venue selected was the same as in 1974, the Teatro Juan Ruiz de Alarcón of the Centro de Convenciones. The theatre was a highly vanguardist building opened in 1973, a few months before hosting the 1974 festival, with a seating capacity for over 2,000 people.

== Participants ==
Broadcasters from nineteen countries participated in this edition of the OTI Festival. The OTI members, public or private broadcasters from Spain and eighteen Spanish and Portuguese speaking countries of Ibero-America signed up for the festival. This equaled the same record number of participants of the two previous years. From the countries that participated in the previous edition, Bolivia and the Dominican Republic decided to withdraw, while Honduras returned after missing that festival and Costa Rica took part for the first time.

Some of the participating broadcasters, such as those representing Chile, Guatemala, and Mexico, selected their entries through their regular national televised competitions. Other broadcasters decided to select their entry internally.

Two performing artist had previously represented the same country in previous editions: José Alfredo Fuentes had represented Chile in 1974, and Pablo Azael had represented Panama in 1975. All the competing songs from all the participating countries were performed in Spanish, even the Brazilian entry.

Participants of the OTI Festival 1976
Country	Broadcaster(s)	Song	Artist	Songwriter(s)	Language	Conductor
Argentina	Teleonce	"¿Cómo olvidar que te quise tanto?"	Adriana Santamaría		Spanish	
Brazil		"María de las flores"	Denisse de Kalafe	Denisse de Kalafe	Spanish	
Chile	TVN; UCTV	"Era sólo un chiquillo"	José Alfredo Fuentes	José Alfredo Fuentes; Óscar Cáceres	Spanish	Horacio Saavedra
Colombia	Caracol Televisión; PUNCH; RTI	"Son de tambores"	Amparito	Germán Espinosa; Francisco Zumaqué; Joe Madrid; Jimmy Salcedo	Spanish	Jimmy Salcedo
Costa Rica	Telecentro; Teletica	"Patria"	Félix Ángel Lobo		Spanish	
Ecuador		"Esos veinte años"	Tito del Salto		Spanish	
El Salvador		"Tú que no mueres en la muerte"	Walter Salvador Bautista		Spanish	
Guatemala		"Que haré sin tí"	Hugo Leonel Baccaro		Spanish	
Honduras		"Por cantarle al mar"	Wilson Reynoot		Spanish	
Mexico	Televisa	"De que te quiero, te quiero"	Gilberto Valenzuela	Rubén Fuentes; Eduardo Magallanes; Mario Molina Montes	Spanish	
Netherlands Antilles	ATM	"El primer criollo"	Jossy Brokke	Jossy Brokke	Spanish	
Nicaragua		"De sol a sol"	Peter Vivas		Spanish	
Panama		"Gracias amor"	Pablo Azael		Spanish	
Peru		"Quiero salir al sol"	Fernando Llosa	Ernesto Pollarolo; Alejandro Romualdo	Spanish	
Puerto Rico	WKAQ-Telemundo	"¿Quién?"	Edward		Spanish	
Spain	TVE	"Canta cigarra"	María Ostiz	María Ostiz	Spanish	Rafael Ibarbia
United States	SIN	"Sangre antigua"	Carmen Moreno	Carmen Moreno	Spanish	
Uruguay	Sociedad Televisora Larrañaga	"Otra vez cantaré"	Ronald		Spanish	
Venezuela		"Soy"	Las Cuatro Monedas	Marlene O'Brien; Kenny O'Brien; Víctor Daniel	Spanish	

== Festival overview ==
The festival was held on Saturday 30 October 1976, beginning at 17:00 CST (23:00 UTC). It was presented by Raúl Velasco and Susana Dosamantes. Velasco had hosted the 1974 festival, making him the first person to host the event twice. The musical director was Jesús Rodriguez de Hijar who conducted the 32-piece Acapulco Philharmonic Orchestra when required. The draw to determine the running order (R/O) was held in Mexico City a few day before the festival.

The winner was the song "Canta cigarra" written and performed by María Ostiz representing Spain; with "Soy", written by Marlene O'Brien, Kenny O'Brien, and Víctor Daniel, and performed by Las Cuatro Monedas representing Venezuela, placing second; and "Era sólo un chiquillo", written by José Alfredo Fuentes and Óscar Cáceres, and performed by Fuentes himself representing Chile, placing third. The festival ended with a reprise of the winning entry.

Winner

Results of the OTI Festival 1976
R/O	Country	Song	Artist	Votes	Place
1	Ecuador	"Esos veinte años"	Tito del Salto	1	15
2	Nicaragua	"De sol a sol"	Peter Vivas	3	8
3	Panama	"Gracias amor"	Pablo Azael	3	8
4	Netherlands Antilles	"El primer criollo"	Jossy Brokke	2	13
5	Brazil	"María de las flores"	Denisse de Kalafe	9	4
6	Mexico	"De que te quiero, te quiero"	Gilberto Valenzuela	8	6
7	Guatemala	"Qué haré sin ti"	Hugo Leonel Vaccaro	3	8
8	Chile	"Era sólo un chiquillo"	José Alfredo Fuentes	12	3
9	Uruguay	"Otra vez cantaré"	Ronald	7	7
10	Colombia	"Son de tambores"	Amparito	9	4
11	Argentina	"¿Cómo olvidar que te quise tanto?"	Adriana Santamaria	3	8
12	El Salvador	"Tú que no mueres en la muerte"	Walter Salvador Bautista	1	15
13	United States	"Sangre antigua"	Carmen Moreno	0	19
14	Venezuela	"Soy"	Las Cuatro Monedas	13	2
15	Peru	"Quiero salir al sol"	Fernando Llosa	1	15
16	Honduras	"Por cantarle al mar"	Wilson Reynoot	3	8
17	Costa Rica	"Patria"	Félix Ángel Lobo	2	13
18	Spain	"Canta cigarra"	María Ostiz	14	1
19	Puerto Rico	"¿Quién?"	Edward	1	15

=== Spokespersons ===
Each participating broadcaster (Note: Or group of broadcasters that jointly participated representing a country.) appointed a spokesperson who was responsible for announcing the points for their respective jury. Known spokespersons at the 1976 festival are listed below.

- Chile – Antonio Vodanovic

== Detailed voting results ==
Each participating broadcaster assembled a national jury located in its respective country, composed of five members each. Each juror gave one vote to its favorite entry and could not vote for the entry representing its own country. Each participating broadcaster had also a delegate present in the hall to stand in for its jury if it was not receiving the event live, or in case of communication failure during the broadcast or voting. To ensure that there was no vote switching, before the voting segment began each participating broadcaster announced to its national audience the vote of its jury in local opt-out from its studios. This time, the spokespersons of each country were contacted by telephone randomly, not in order of performance.

=== The scoreboard ===
For the year's edition, Televisa made the first-of-its-kind voting screens for the OTI Festival. Located at the left side of the hall, the colored board had twenty different screens, five per row in four rows, using one screen for each of the nineteen countries, and one for the OTI logo. Each of the country screens had the name of the country and how many votes they got so far.

== Broadcast ==
The festival was broadcast in the 19 participating countries, where the corresponding OTI member broadcasters relayed the contest through their networks after receiving it live via satellite.

Known details on the broadcasts of the festival in each country, including the specific broadcasting stations, commentators, and presenters of the local opt-out are shown in the tables below.

Broadcasters, commentators, and local presenters in participating countries
Country	Broadcaster	Channel(s)	Commentator(s)	Local presenter(s)	Ref.
Argentina	Teleonce				
Chile	TVN	Canal 7 (Note: Delayed broadcast at 22:05 CLST (01:05+1 UTC))		Antonio Vodanovic and Gina Zuanic	
Chile	UCTV	Canal 13		Antonio Vodanovic and Gina Zuanic	
Colombia	Inravisión (Note: Through the programadoras: Caracol Televisión, Producciones Nacionales Colombianas de Hoy (PUNCH), and Radio Televisión Interamericana (RTI).)	Primera Cadena (Note: Delayed broadcast at 21:30 COT (02:30+1 UTC))			
Costa Rica	Telecentro	Telecentro Canal 6			
Costa Rica	Teletica	Canal 7			
Mexico	Televisa	Canal 2			
Netherlands Antilles	ATM	TeleCuraçao (Note: Delayed broadcast on 20 November at 23:00 AST (03:00+1 UTC))			
Puerto Rico	WKAQ-Telemundo	Canal 2			
Spain	TVE	TVE 1			
United States	SIN				

== Reception ==
The audience returned to the viewing figures of two hundred million viewers that the festival received two years before in the same city.

The winner María Ostiz was already an established artist in Spain, especially thanks to her songs that usually revolved around the tough life of the rural population in 1970s Spain. Their songs used to have a cheerful spirit, although her song in the festival was completely different. "Canta cigarra" was a sad and pessimistic protest song in which the farmers, the women, the oppressed people with their hopelessness and hunger were mentioned as main elements. The selection of such a controversial song as the Spanish entry was attributed to the fall of the censorship after the death of dictator Francisco Franco.

When the OTI Festival was being held, "Canta cigarra" was one of the least favoured entries in the betting odds due to the unusual simplicity of its production. While the voting process was taking place, Ostiz, who was not confident about the possibilities of her song in the contest, left the green room and went to the hotel. When her victory was clear after the decisive Chilean votes, she had to return to the stage dressed in her casual clothes.

The second placed entrants, the Venezuelan disco fusion band Las Cuatro Monedas, were also already famous in their country with an eleven year career. They were famous for combining disco rhythms with Jamaican and Caribbean influences. Thanks to their second place, the prestige of their career was confirmed in Venezuela.

The third placed entrant, the Chilean José Alfredo Fuentes, also saw his career consolidated due to his third place in the festival, significantly improving the eighth place he got back in 1974 in the same city.

One of the fourth placed entrants, the Brazilian entrant Denise de Kalafe, who was tied with the Colombian representative, had already represented her country in 1970 in the "Festival Mundial de la Canción Latina", the antecessor of the OTI Festival in 1970. With her fourth place in 1976 with her song "María de las flores", she started generating interest not only in her country Brazil, but also in Mexico, where her popularity had started rising. Two years later in 1978, she would return to the festival and win the event.
