= Mister Loco =

Mexican band

Mr. Loco, also known as Mister Loco or Mr. Loco Band, is a Mexican band formed in 1975. They sing mostly in English and occasionally in Spanish. Their sound is a combination of pop rock and Latin American folk.

== History ==
Mister Loco is an offshoot band established by previous members of the rock band Los Locos Del Ritmo. The members are Javier (Xavier) Garza Alarcón, Jorge García Castil, and Rafael Acosta. Although Mister Loco was formed in 1975, individually the six members studied Latin American folk and modern music for fifteen years. Mister Loco was formed with a somewhat adventurous and original idea: to combine traditional Latin rhythms and instruments with popular music. In 1975, they won the World Popular Song Festival at the Nippon Budokan in Tokyo.

== Nacho Libre ==
In 2006, the band featured on the soundtrack for director Jared Hess's film Nacho Libre. Musician Beck suggested the album to Hess for use in the film because of his knowledge of their work. "Hombre Religioso (Religious Man)" is the title song, and the songs "Bubble Gum", "Papas", and "Mister Loco" also feature in the film.

== Discography ==
=== Albums ===
- Uno (1975)
- Lucky Man (1976)
- Sencillamente Nunca (1978)
- Dancing Loco Disco (as "Mr. Loco Loco") (1979)
- Mystic (2007)

=== Singles ===
- "Lucky Man" (1975, Mexico)
- "Bubble Gum" / (Tu) Solo Tu (1976)
- "Mr Loco"
- "Religious Man"
- "Papas"
- "Religious Man" w/ Danny Elfman
- "Cancun Moon" (2007)
- "Rocking Mariachis" (2007)
- "Nacho Libre" (2007)
- "Sacred Secrets" (2007)
