= Rosy Armen =

French singer of Armenian descent

Rosy Armen (Armenian: Ռոզի Արմեն) is a French singer of Armenian descent. She is a multilingual singer, with most songs in French and Armenian, but also in other languages such as English, German, Spanish, and Italian.

== Biography ==
Rosy Armen was born to Kourchoud Hovhannessian from Dzhagry, Nakhitchevan and to Nvart Alozian from an Armenian suburb of Van. The Armenian couple had met each other after having immigrated to France in the 1920s. Rosy Hohannessian was born in Paris, France, on 1 May 1939. Rosy has been singing since the age of four, when she would lead the youth orchestra of her school until she eventually started singing solo songs. Despite her parents disapproval of a career in singing, Rosy Hohannessian, later Rosy Bedrossian continued on with her passion and eventually, took the stage name Rosy Armen and had success also singing next to established French music stars in France. She chose the last name Armen so that her Armenian fans would be aware of her nationality.

This success made her a well-known figure not only in France, but also all over Europe, the Soviet Union, United States and the Middle East where there were many Armenian communities and was invited to the imperial coronation as the official singer in October 1967. In 1970 she took part in the selection rounds to represent Spain at the Eurovision Song Contest 1970, singing "Gwendolyne". Julio Iglesias, went on to represent Spain with the same song. In the finals, Armen was part of the trio singing backing vocals.

Her repertoire includes music from Aram Khachaturian, Arno Babadjanian, Michel Legrand. She sing Boris Pasternak and Yevgeny Yevtushenko poems.

At the height of her career, French television covered her concerts abroad through the efforts of Michel Lancelot and Roger Benamou. In France, she gave concerts in best music theaters including one Olympia in Paris. She also sang at the Waldorf Astoria in New York, at the Los Angeles Music Center, at Place des Arts theater in Montreal, and Luzhniki Palace of Sports in Moscow.

After the 1988 earthquake in Armenia, Charles Aznavour invited her to record alongside him and other singers the song "Pour toi Arménie", a song that remained in 1st place for 10 weeks in a row in the French Top 50. In 1990, she did a tour in Armenia to help the people recovering from the earthquake and to show France's support to Armenians. Already popular in the Armenian diaspora for many decades, Rosy Armen has become very popular in Armenia as well. Since the nineties Rosy Armen performed several live shows in Russia, Armenia, Los Angeles, as well as on many TV and radio shows in France and Armenia.

In April 2014, she received the "Armenian Music Award" as the honor of the Armenian music in the Kremlin in Moscow from the President of Armenians in Moscow, Ara Abramyan.

In December 2014, during a new ceremony, Rosy Armen received further recognition with "International Music Award" at the Moscow Kremlin, for singing in the countries of the world in different languages including Armenian.

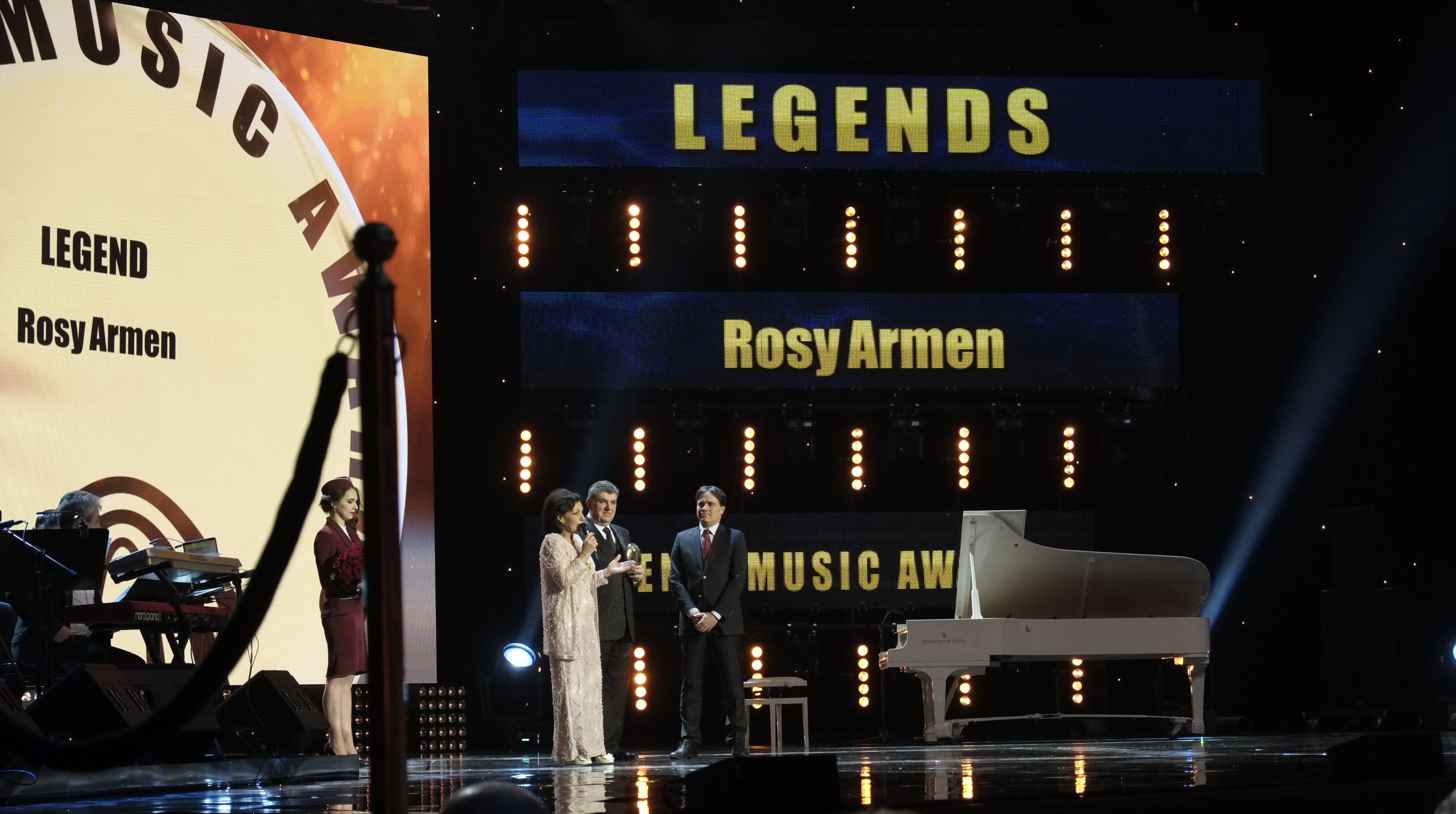
Rosy Armen & Ara Abramyan AMA 2014 Moscou

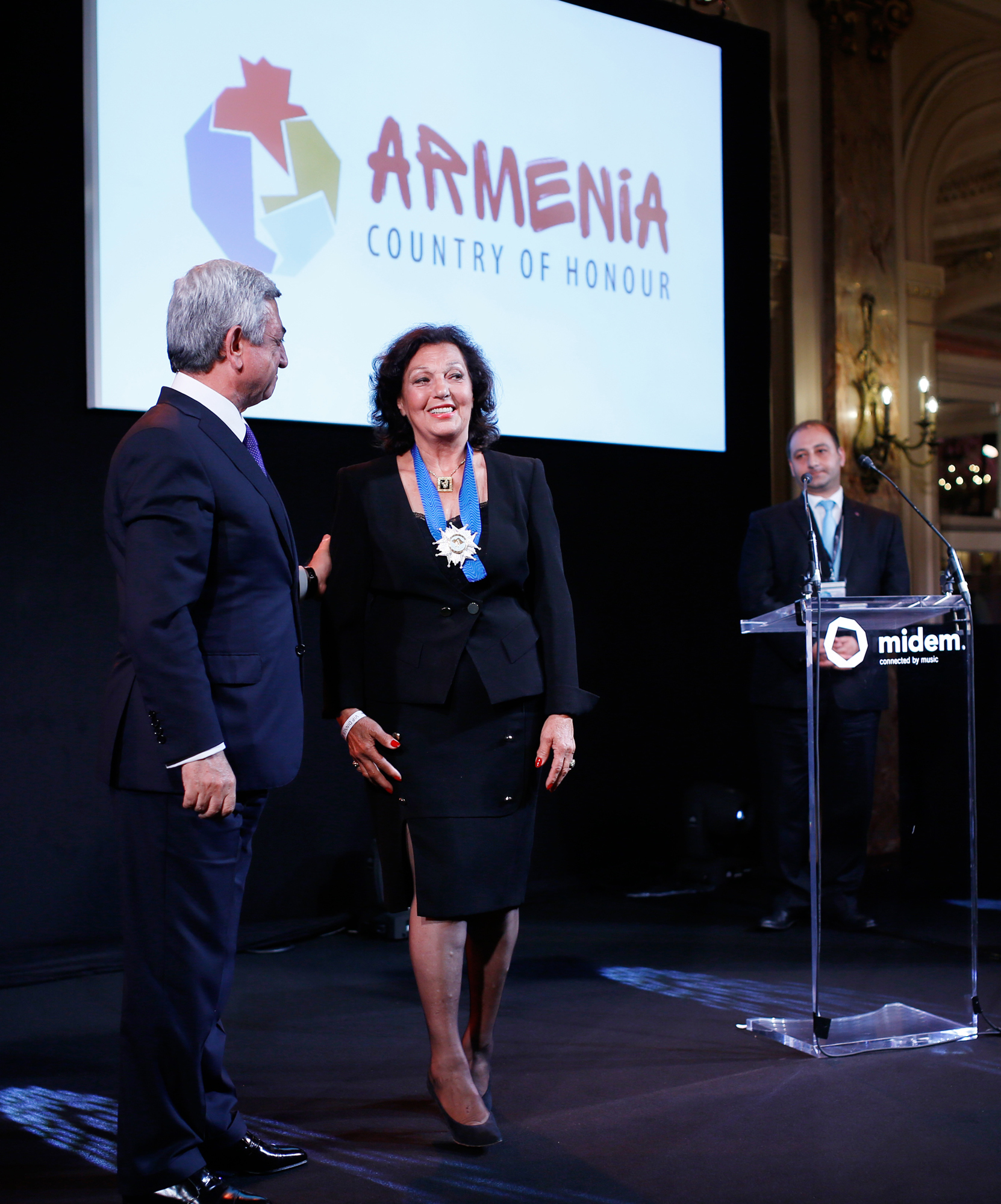
Rosy Armen & the President of Armenia, Serzh Sargsyan.

During MIDEM 2015 in Cannes, Armenia was honored to mark the centennial of the Genocide 24 April 1915, Rosy Armen received the Legion of Honor from the hands of the President of Armenia, Serzh Sargsyan.

After being honored by all these prizes she returned to the recording studio to work on her new album, expected for 2017.

== Discography ==
=== Maxi singles ===
- Moi qui t'aimais (Vogue, 1961)
- Né pour moi (Vogue, 1961)
- Cuando calienta el sol (Vogue, 1962)
- Tu croiras (Vogue, 1962)
- La dernière étoile (Vogue, 1963)
- Prenez garde (Vogue, 1963)
- Yes mi siroun (Vogue, 1964)
- Si j'étais sûre (Polydor, 1964)
- La grande Russie (CBS, 1965)
- Bons baisers de Russie (CBS, 1965)
- Le jeu des amoureux (CBS, 1966)
- Dele divané (Top 4, 1966)
- L'âme slave (Top 4, 1966)
- Le ciel, la Terre et l'amour (Top 4, 1966)
- La première fois (CBS, 1966)
- Ailleurs qu'à Paris (Melodia, 1967)

=== Songs in Armenian ===
- Bulbul
- Noubar Noubar
- Yes Mi Siroun
- Oror Oror
- Mardiguy Yerker
- Yerevan
- Bantertoutyan Anabadoum
- Vayri Dzaghig
- Yes Pelpoul Em
- Tampe Tserine
- Hingala
- Im anoush maïrik
- Our es
- Hay herosneri Yerke
- Djan Hayrenik
- Zouloum achkhar
- Haireni yerguir
- Achnan yerke
- Hey djan lucine
- Ourine
- Mi sirde ounem
- Hove
- Sar tarter
- Dzarikneri yerke
- Penditz ternere
- Sarvori yerke

=== Songs in French ===
- Les moulins de mon coeur
- Dans le même instant
- L'été 42
- Le messager
- La plus jolie saison du monde
- Du soleil au coeur
- Dans ses yeux
- Aranjuez
- Vania
- La rose noir
- Pasternak
- Ven ven ven
- Guerillero
- La dernière balade
- Oui ou non
- El pecador
- La patchka
- Où sont les garçons
- Ne cherches pas
- Nous étions enfants
- Souvenirs d'Espagne
- Si on se ressemble
- Je chante pour vous
- Y aura toujours des roses

=== Songs in Spanish ===
- Mi destino
- Gwendoline
- Bajo el cielo de Moscou
- Ven ven ven
- Guerillero
- La ultima balada
- Si o No

=== Songs in Russian ===
- Tchortovo Koleso
- Vstrechi

=== Songs in German ===
- Nur einen sommer lang
- Wenn du durch diese tür gehst
- Du bist bei mir
- Lies meine briefe

=== Songs in Persian ===
- Dele divane

=== Albums ===
- Rosy Armen (Vogue, 1963)
- Rosy Armen (Melodia, 1967)
- Si on se resemble (Columbia, 1968)
- Gwendolyne (Columbia, 1971)
- Yerevan (Iberia, 1972)
- Rosy Armen (Ambar, 1972)
- Blboul (Arka, 1981)
- Aranjuez (Arka, 1982)
- Hier et demain (PSI International, 1986)
- Armenia (1992)
- Le top de l'Arménie (PSI International, 1996)
- Mi sirde ounem (Atlantis Records, 2001)
- Im anoush maïrik (Remastered Gam Studio Production 2013)
- Les moulins de mon coeur (Remastered Gam Studio Production 2013)
