= France in the Eurovision Song Contest 1970 =

- Eurovision Song Contest 1970
- Participating broadcaster: Office de Radiodiffusion Télévision Française (ORTF)
- Country: France
- Selection process: National final
- Selection date: 21 February 1970

Competing entry
- Song: "Marie-Blanche"
- Artist: Guy Bonnet
- Songwriters: Guy Bonnet; André-Pierre Dousset

Placement
- Final result: 4th, 8 points

Participation chronology

France was represented at the Eurovision Song Contest 1970 with the song "Marie-Blanche", composed by Guy Bonnet, with lyrics by André-Pierre Dousset, and performed by Bonnet himself. The French participating broadcaster, Office de Radiodiffusion Télévision Française (ORTF), selected its entry through a seven-week televised show titled Musicolor. "Marie-Blanche" came in fourth place out of twelve, and received eight points at the contest.

== Before Eurovision ==
=== National final ===
For 1970, after eight years of internal selections, Office de Radiodiffusion Télévision Française (ORTF) organized a televised national final which lasted seven weeks. A professional jury chose 16 out of the 143 songs submitted to go to the Saturday evening music show titled Musicolor which would choose the entrant for 1970. Musicolor consisted of four quarter-finals, two semi-finals, and a final with shows taking place each Saturday. Four songs were performed each week and were voted on by various juries representing the regional stations of ORTF. The juries could qualify one song to go to the next round.

By the fifth and sixth Saturdays, the juries had selected four songs to participate in the two semi-finals, with semi consisting of two songs. The winner of each semi-final went to the final round which was held on February 21, 1970 and hosted by Dany Danielle and Sylvain Deschamps. At the final, "Marie-Blanche" performed by Guy Bonnet won over "Olivier, Olivia" performed by Daniel Beretta and Isabelle Aubret.

== At Eurovision ==
Guy Bonnet performed "Marie-Blanche" sixth on the night, before the United Kingdom's "Knock Knock, Who's There?" by Mary Hopkin, and following Belgium's "Viens l'oublier" by Jean Vallée. At the close of voting, the song received eight points: three from Ireland, two from Monaco and Yugoslavia, and one from Italy, placing it fourth out of the twelve entrants. Each participating broadcaster assembled a ten-member jury panel who gave one point to their favorite song each.

=== Voting ===
Points awarded to France
Score	Country
3 points	Ireland
2 points	Monaco; Yugoslavia
1 point	Italy

Points awarded by France
Score	Country
3 points	Belgium
2 points	Monaco; Switzerland; United Kingdom
1 point	Ireland
